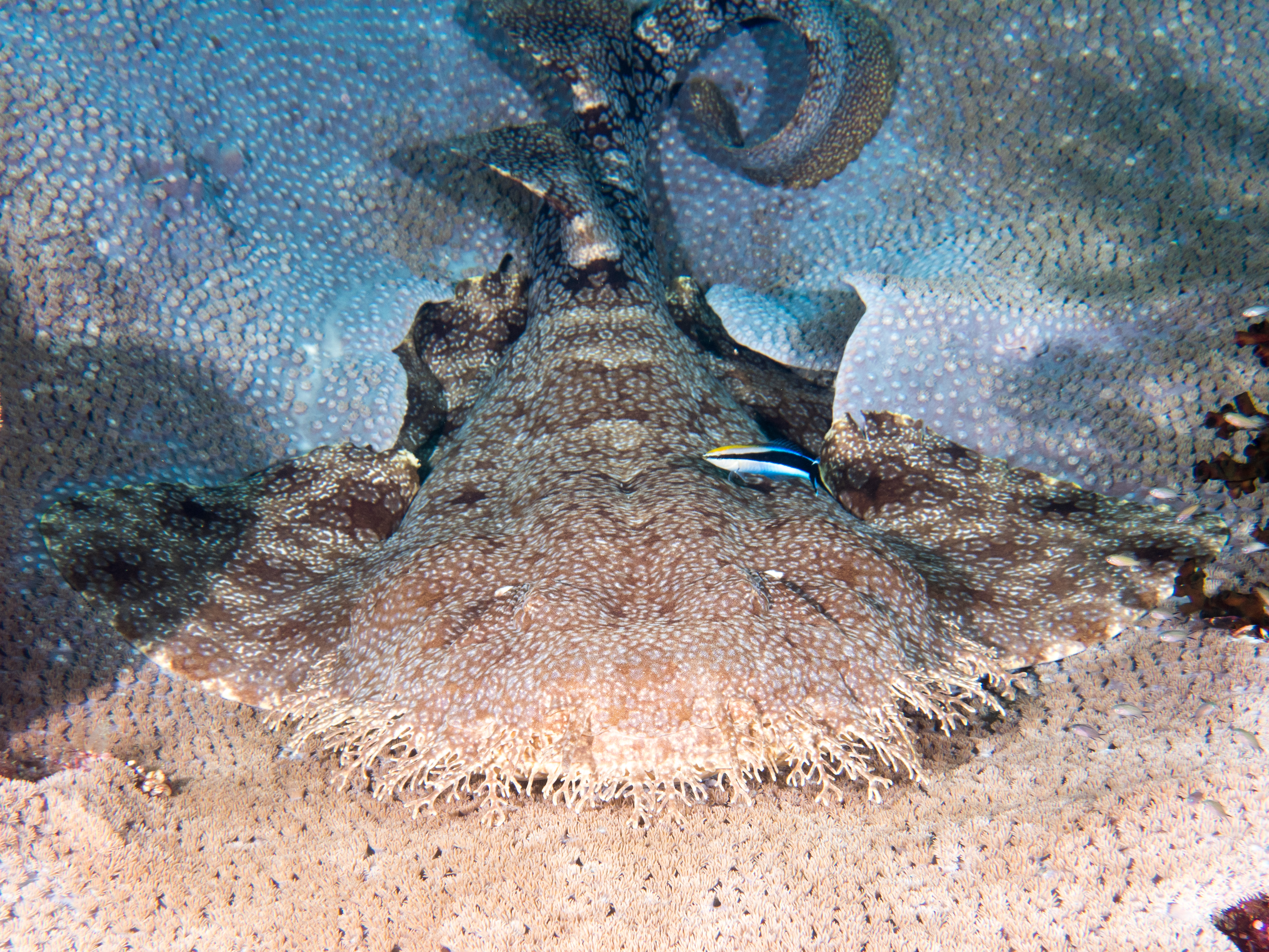

Conservation status
- Least Concern (IUCN 3.1)

Scientific classification
- Kingdom: Animalia
- Phylum: Chordata
- Class: Chondrichthyes
- Subclass: Elasmobranchii
- Division: Selachii
- Order: Orectolobiformes
- Family: Orectolobidae
- Genus: Eucrossorhinus; Regan, 1908
- Species: E. dasypogon

Binomial name
- Eucrossorhinus dasypogon (Bleeker, 1867)
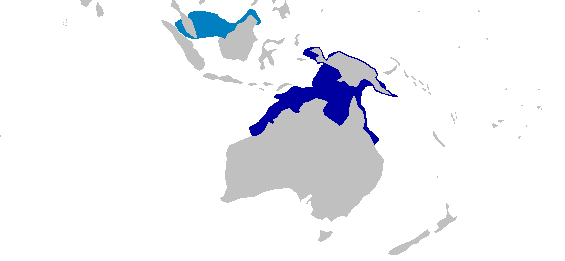
- Confirmed (dark blue) and suspected (light blue) range of the tasselled wobbegong

Synonyms
- Crossorhinus dasypogon Bleeker, 1867; Orectolobus dasypogon Bleeker, 1867; Orectolobus ogilbyi Regan, 1909

= Tasselled wobbegong =

Species of shark

The tasselled wobbegong (Eucrossorhinus dasypogon) is a species of carpet shark in the family Orectolobidae and the only extant member of the genus Eucrossorhinus. It inhabits shallow coral reefs off northern Australia, New Guinea, and adjacent islands. Reaching 1.8 m (5.9 ft) in length, this species has a broad and flattened body and head. Its most distinctive trait is a fringe of branching dermal flaps around its head, which extends onto its chin. The fringe, along with its complex color pattern of small blotches and reticulations, enable it to camouflage itself against the reef environment.

During the day, the solitary tasselled wobbegong can generally be found lying inside caves or under ledges with its tail curled. Individual sharks tend to remain within a local area and have favored resting spots. While resting, it opportunistically ambushes nearby fish and invertebrates, and also lures in prey by waving its tail to mimic the appearance of a small fish. At night, it emerges and actively forages for food. This species is aplacental viviparous, though little is known of its life history. The tasselled wobbegong has been reported to bite and kill humans unprovoked, although such has only been reported once in 1940. The International Union for Conservation of Nature (IUCN) listed this species as Near Threatened in 2003, as outside of Australia it is threatened by fisheries and habitat degradation. As of 2015, its IUCN status is Least Concern.

== Taxonomy and phylogeny ==
Dutch ichthyologist Pieter Bleeker originally described the tasselled wobbegong in an 1867 volume of Archives Néerlandaises des Sciences Exactes et Naturelles. His account was based on two Indonesian specimens, one caught off Waigeo and the other off Aru. He gave it the name dasypogon, from the Greek dasys ("hairy") and pogon ("beard"), and assigned it to the genus Crossorhinus (a synonym of Orectolobus). In 1908, Charles Tate Regan created the new genus Eucrossorhinus for this species, derived from the Greek eu ("well"), krossoi ("tassel") and rhinos ("nose"). Regan subsequently reconsidered the main trait he used to separate Eucrossorhinus (the spacing of the fourth and fifth gill slits) and synonymized it with Orectolobus. Later authors have placed the tasselled wobbegong either in its own genus or in Orectolobus. Other common names for this species are bearded wobbegong and Ogilby's wobbegong.

- - Orectolobus wardi
  - - Eucrossorhinus dasypogon
    - - Orectolobus ornatus
      - - - Sutorectus tentaculatus
          - Orectolobus floridus
        - - - Orectolobus hutchinsi
            - Orectolobus parvimaculatus
          - - Orectolobus halei
            - - Orectolobus maculatus
              - - Orectolobus japonicus
                - Orectolobus leptolineatus

Phylogenetic tree of the wobbegongs.

Morphological studies have been inconclusive about the evolutionary relationships of the tasselled wobbegong, but overall have gauged it to be among the more derived wobbegong (Orectolobidae) species. A 2009 phylogenetic analysis based on mitochondrial and nuclear DNA found otherwise, that this species was in fact basal to all other wobbegongs except the northern wobbegong (O. wardi). This result supports the synonymization of Eucrossorhinus with Orectolobus. Molecular clock estimation placed the speciation of the tasselled wobbegong at 11–6 Ma, coinciding with a period of significant geological rearrangement and the formation of coral reef habitats in the region.

== Description ==
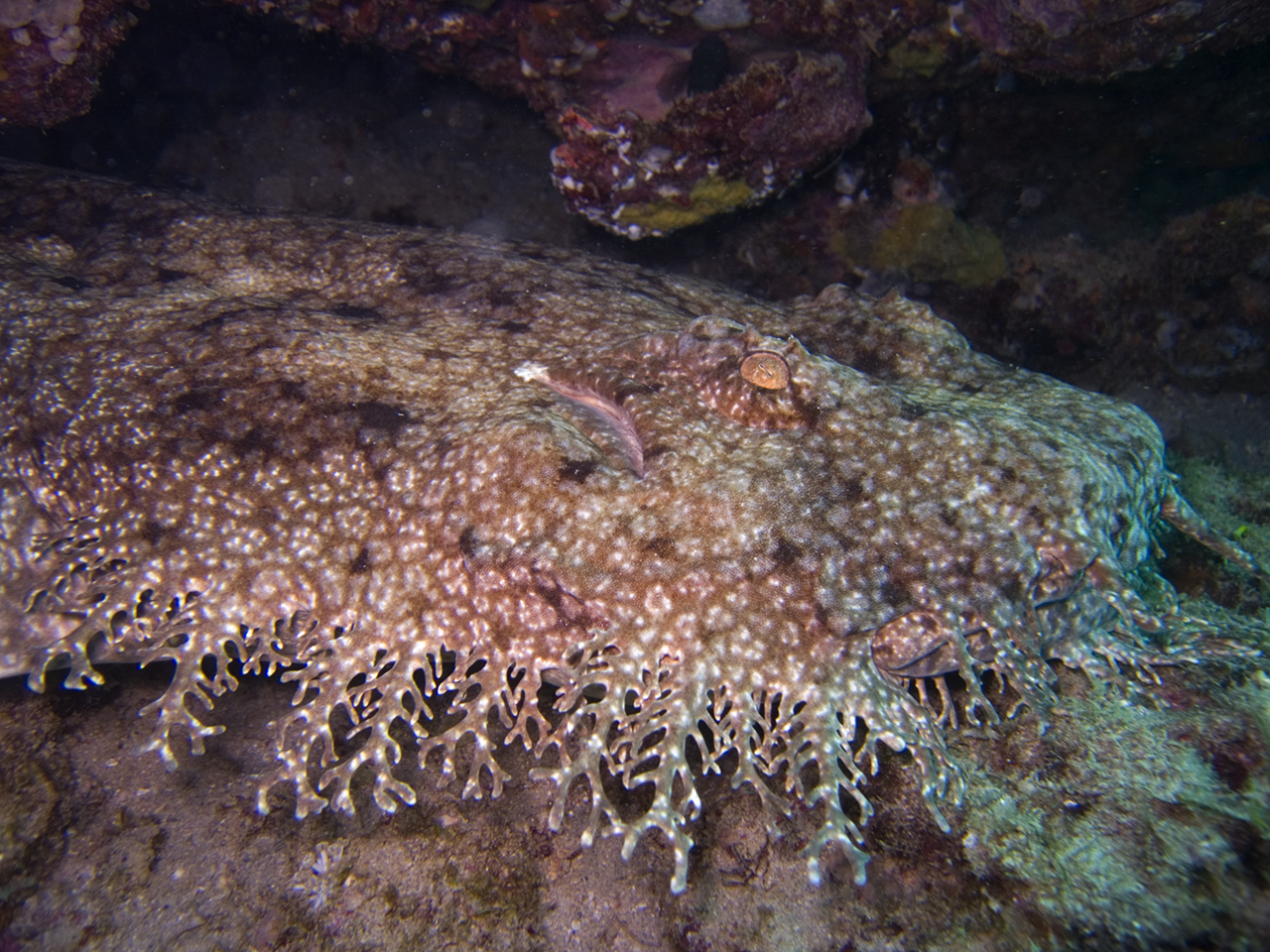
The tasselled wobbegong can be readily identified by the fringe of dermal lobes on its head.

The tasselled wobbegong is a very broad, moderately flattened shark. The head is wider than long, with a distinctive fringe of branching dermal lobes running almost continuously from the snout tip to the origins of the pectoral fins, including a "beard" on the chin. The nostrils bear long, branching barbels, and have grooves surrounding them and connecting them to the mouth. There are tubercles above the eyes but not elsewhere, and behind the eyes are larger spiracles. The large mouth is positioned ahead of the eyes, almost at the end of the head. There are furrows on the lower jaw extending from the mouth corners and along the jaw median. There are 23–26 upper and 19 lower tooth rows; each tooth has a single slender, pointed cusp. The three upper and two lower rows of symphysial (central) teeth are especially long and fang-like. The five pairs of gill slits are short.

The pectoral and pelvic fins are large and rounded. The dorsal fins are short-based and fairly tall; the first is slightly larger than the second and originates over the latter quarter of the pelvic fin bases. Behind the pelvic fins, the body rapidly tapers to the short caudal peduncle. The anal fin originates behind the midpoint of the second dorsal fin and is no more than half its size. The caudal fin is short, with no lower lobe and an upper lobe bearing a strong ventral notch near the tip. This species has a mosaic-like dorsal color pattern consisting of numerous small, dark blotches and lines on a gray- or yellow-brown background; there may also be darker bands. The pattern extends to the underside of the tail and the ventral pectoral and pelvic fin margins. The ventral surface is otherwise white. The tasselled wobbegong is reliably known to reach a length of 1.8 m (5.9 ft). Most authors consider an older record of a 3.7 m (12 ft) long individual to be erroneous.

== Distribution and habitat ==
The range of the tasselled wobbegong encompasses the continental shelf of northern Australia from Ningaloo Reef in the west to Bundaberg in the east, as well as New Guinea, Waigeo, and the Aru Islands. Additional records from Malaysia are unconfirmed. This common bottom-dweller inhabits coral reefs, perhaps exclusively, in both inshore and offshore waters from the intertidal zone to around 50 m (160 ft) deep. It is most often encountered in reef channels and faces, or atop coral heads.

== Biology and ecology ==
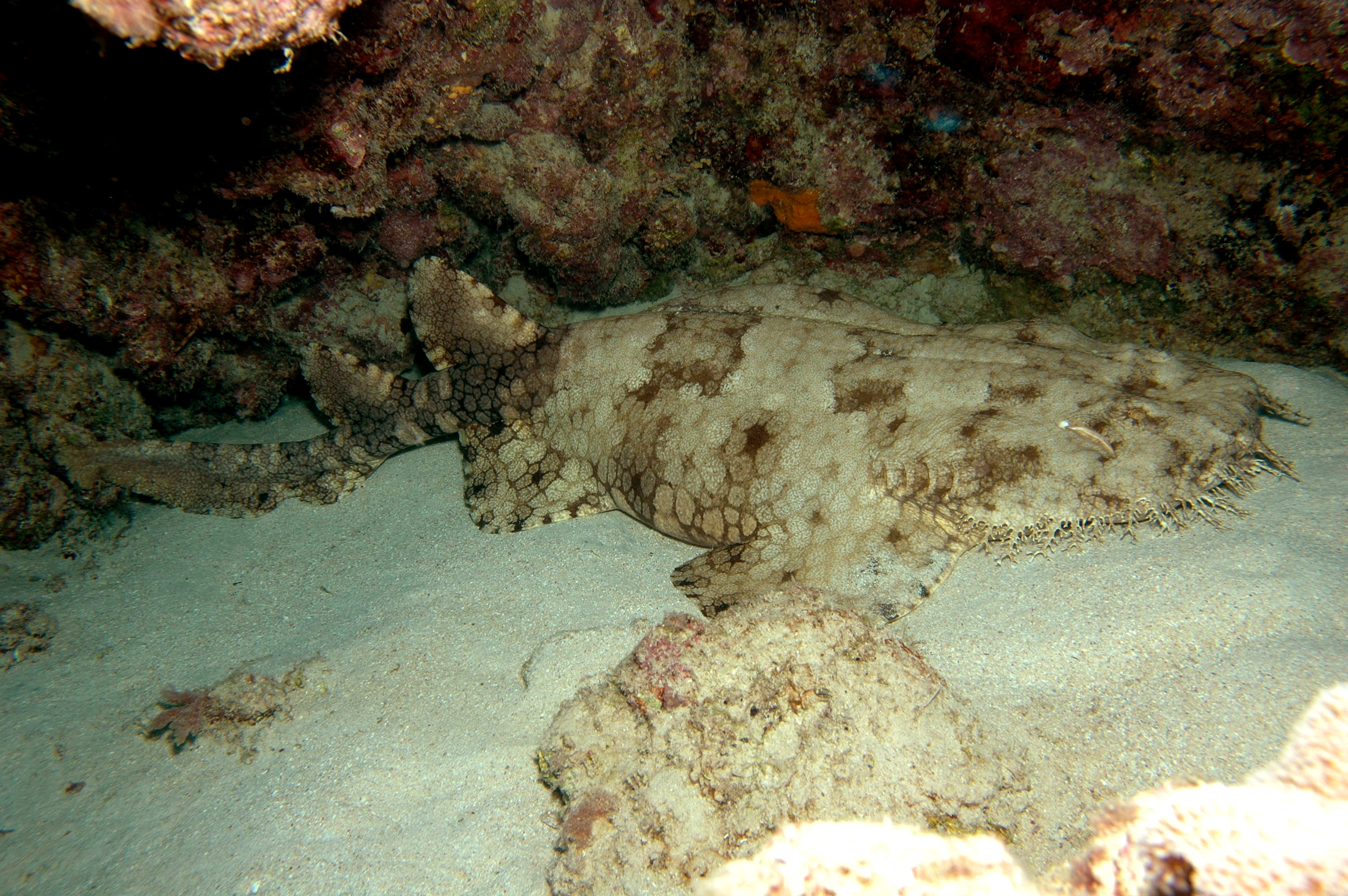
The tasselled wobbegong is mostly inactive in daytime, resting in a sheltered location on the reef.

Considered the most specialized member of its family, the tasselled wobbegong's ornate coloration and complex dermal fringe grants it excellent camouflage, while it is probably a slower swimmer than related species. It is solitary and spends most of the day lying motionless inside caves or under ledges with its tail curled up. Individual sharks have a small home range, containing several preferred resting spots that are used repeatedly. This species becomes more active at night, swimming onto the reef to hunt.

The tasselled wobbegong feeds on bony and cartilaginous fishes, crustaceans, and cephalopods. Its capacious mouth allows sizeable prey to be swallowed, with one documented case of a 1.3 m (4.3 ft) long individual consuming a 1.0 m (3.3 ft) long brownbanded bamboo shark (Chiloscyllium punctatum). During daytime, this species is an opportunistic ambush predator. It preys upon schooling nocturnal fishes such as squirrelfishes, soldierfishes, and sweepers that often shelter in the same cave. Tiny fishes and crustaceans have been seen settling atop the resting wobbegong's head, attracting larger fishes that are in turn attacked by the wobbegong. Observations in captivity have further revealed that this species seems to engage in active luring behavior. When it perceives food nearby, it begins to slowly wave its tail back and forth; its caudal fin resembles a small fish, complete with a dark eyespot at the base. The shark typically rests with its head elevated, which places it within striking distance of any prey drawn by its tail.

The tapeworm Parachristianella monomegacantha is a known parasite of the tasselled wobbegong. This species has been observed being attended by cleaner shrimp (Leander urocaridella, Stenopus hispidus) and bluestreak cleaner wrasse (Labroides dimidiatus). Reproduction is presumably aplacental viviparous like other wobbegongs, with the developing embryos sustained by yolk. There is a report of mating being observed inside a cave at night. Newborns measure approximately 20 cm (7.9 in) long. Size at sexual maturity is uncertain; one recorded male was found to be adult at 1.2 m (3.9 ft) long.

== Human interactions ==
With several records of apparently unprovoked attacks on people, the tasselled wobbegong has a reputation beyond other wobbegongs for aggressive behavior. Gilbert Whitley even wrote in 1940 that it "attacks and generally kills the natives" of Papua New Guinea. Though Whitley's claim is questionable, this species is certainly capable of inflicting severe wounds. Conversely, the tasselled wobbegong is also an ecotourism attraction and many divers have approached it without incident. Given this shark's cryptic appearance and poor vision, humans should exercise caution to avoid accidentally harassing it or causing it to mistake a hand or foot for prey. This species adapts well to captivity and is occasionally found in the home aquarium trade.

The tasselled wobbegong has little economic value, though its attractive skin is occasionally used for leather. In Australian waters, it is not fished and faces minimal threats. However, elsewhere in its range it may be negatively affected by extensive fishery activity and habitat degradation from pollution, blast fishing, and coral removal. The International Union for Conservation of Nature (IUCN) has assessed this species as Least Concern.
