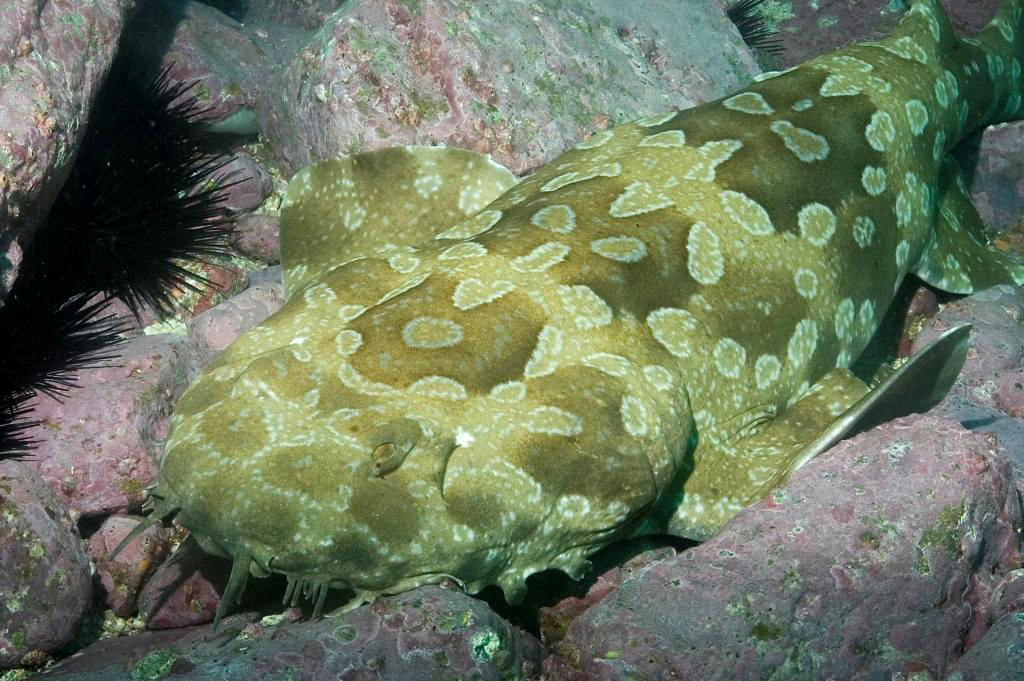
- At Cod Grounds Marine Park, Australia

Conservation status
- Least Concern (IUCN 3.1)

Scientific classification
- Kingdom: Animalia
- Phylum: Chordata
- Class: Chondrichthyes
- Subclass: Elasmobranchii
- Division: Selachii
- Order: Orectolobiformes
- Family: Orectolobidae
- Genus: Orectolobus
- Species: O. maculatus

Binomial name
- Orectolobus maculatus (Bonnaterre, 1788)
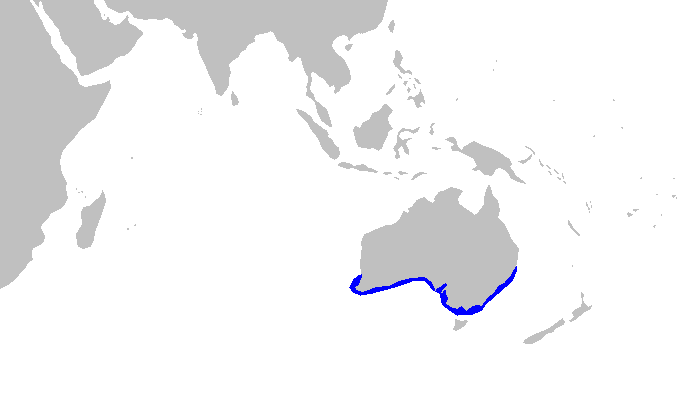
- Range of spotted wobbegong (in blue)

Synonyms
- Squalus maculatus Bonnaterre, 1778; Squalus barbatus Gmelin, 1789; Squalus lobatus Bloch & Schneider, 1801; Squalus appendiculatus Shaw & Nodder, 1806; Squalus labiatus Bleeker, 1857

= Spotted wobbegong =

Species of shark

The spotted wobbegong (Orectolobus maculatus) is a carpet shark in the family Orectolobidae, endemic to Australia. It is a large, robust species, typically reaching 150–180 centimetres (59–71 in) in length. Coloured green, yellow, or brown, it has distinctive O-shaped spots throughout its body. It is nocturnal, resting at day and feeding on fish and invertebrates at night. An ovoviviparous species, the spotted wobbegong gives birth in the spring, during which time males can act aggressively towards other males and females. It has been known to bite humans, sometimes unprovoked, which can produce severe wounds. The species is fished commercially in Australia, but it is not severely threatened. It is listed as a least-concern species on the IUCN Red List.

== Taxonomy ==
The species was described by Pierre Joseph Bonnaterre in 1778. He classified it in the genus Squalus, with the full scientific name of Squalus maculatus. Bonnaterre redescribed the species in 1788 in Orectolobus, its current genus, making its full scientific name Orectolobus maculatus, with Squalus maculatus now a synonym of it. Other synonyms of the species include Squalus barbatus (Gmelin, 1789), Squalus lobatus (Bloch & Schneider, 1801), Squalus appendiculatus (Shaw & Nodder, 1806), and Squalus labiatus (Bleeker, 1857). The spotted wobbegong's genus name is based on the Greek words "orektos" and "lobos", and translates roughly to "stretched out lobe". Its specific name, maculatus, means "spotted" in Latin, named as such for the spotted pattern of its body. Alternate common names in English for the species include carpet shark, common carpet shark, common catshark, tassel shark, and wobbegong.

The spotted wobbegong has previously been synonymised with Orectolobus parvimaculatus, the dwarf spotted wobbegong, in Western Australia. However, the spotted wobbegong has smaller and less dense dorsal fins, which lack the black markings that the dwarf spotted wobbegong's dorsal fins have, differentiating the two fishes. Therefore, the two wobbegongs are classified as two separate species. The spotted wobbegong has been confused with the Gulf wobbegong (Orectolobus hatei) in New South Wales, but the white marks of the spotted wobbegong, as well as its greater number of dermal lobes, distinguish the two species. It is also frequently confused with the ornate wobbegong (Orectolobus ornatus).

The following diagram shows the relationship between the spotted wobbegong and five other selected species in the genus Orectolobus:

- Genus Orectolobus
  - O. floridus
  - - - O. halei
      - - - O. hutchinsi
          - O. parvimaculatus
        - O. maculatus
    - O. ornatus

== Description ==
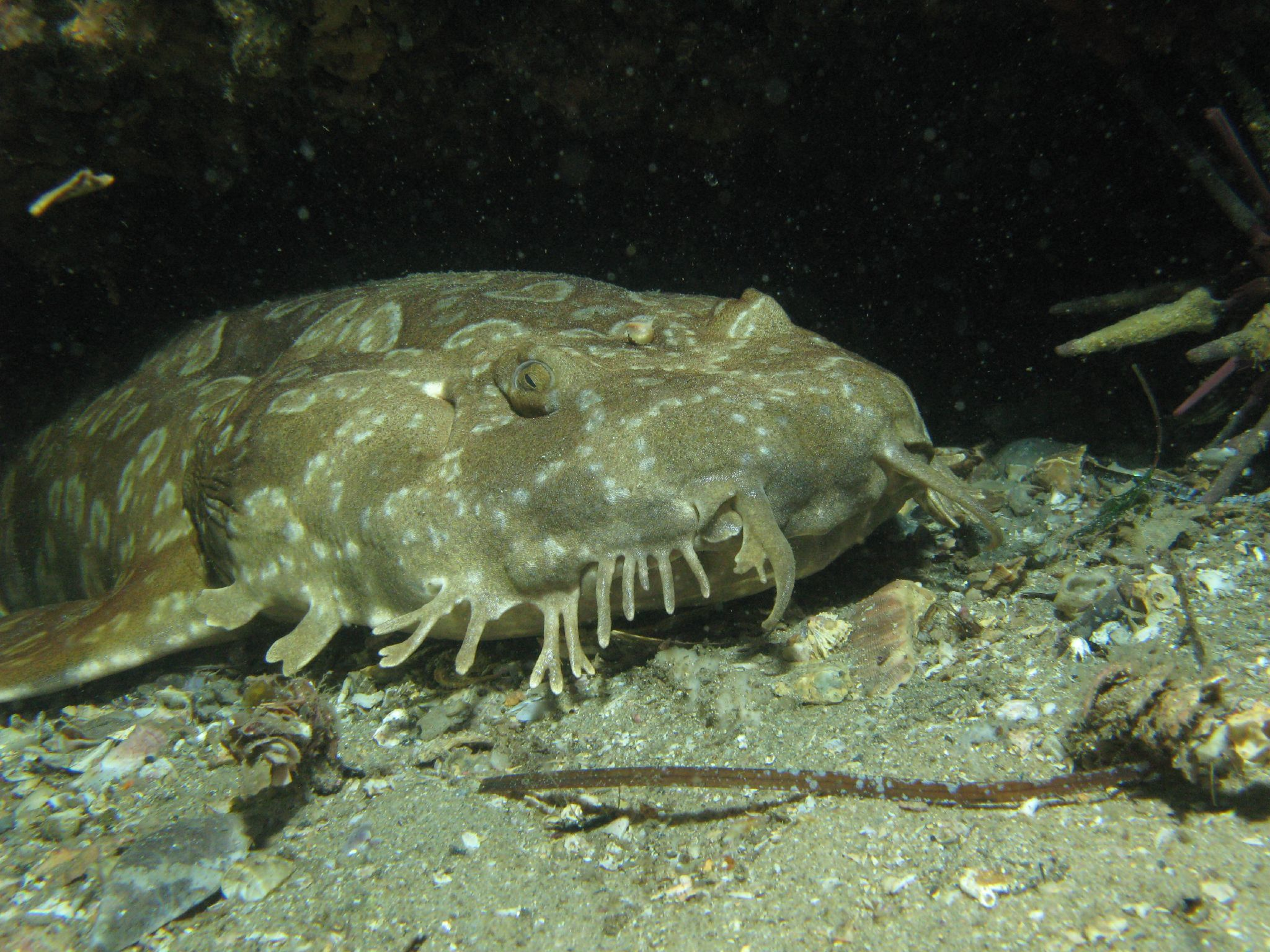
A view of the mouth and eyes, including the tentacles around its mouth

The spotted wobbegong has a large, robust body, which thins beyond its pelvic fins. It grows in the range of 150–180 centimetres (59–71 in), but can reach 320 centimetres (130 in). It is green, yellow, or brown in colour, with a darker back and darker saddles. It is covered with O-shaped spots, which distinguish it from other species that look similar to it. It has six to ten dermal lobes behind and in front of its eye and a tubercle above its eye. Its body lacks ridges or caudal keels. Other characteristics of the species include dermal flaps surrounding the rim of its mouth, large barbels extending from its nostrils, and large spiracles.

Like other sharks, the spotted wobbegong has abundant pores that operate as electroreceptors in its skin. They are used to detect the electric fields of nearby animals, making it easier to find prey. Marine & Freshwater Research, a peer-reviewed scientific journal, studied and compared the electroreceptors of the spotted wobbegong to those of the Australian angelshark (Squatina australis), a distantly related shark species. The spotted wobbegong has a more complex electrosensory system than the Australian angelshark, and the spotted wobbegong has a pore cluster inside its snout that is not present in the Australian angelshark. For both species, these electroreceptors are an important mechanism in feeding.

== Ecology ==
A nocturnal species, the spotted wobbegong feeds at night and rests in sandy bottoms, coral reefs, and coastal bays in the day. Adults most commonly occur on algae-covered rocky reefs and meadows of sea grass or sand, while juveniles are mostly found in estuaries. Because of the species' colour pattern, it camouflages well on rocky bottoms. Although it has not been confirmed, the species may always return to a single site repeatedly throughout its life. Its diet consists of fishes, including luderick, scorpionfishes, sea basses, other smaller shark species (including individuals of their own species), and rays, and various invertebrates, such as crabs, lobsters, and octopuses. Like all wobbegongs, it has a short mouth and broad pharynx, which allow it to suck up prey more easily. The species' prey have been known to wander right up to it, including near its mouth, sometimes nibbling its tentacles.

The spotted wobbegong gathers in groups. The selection of specimens in a group was previously thought to be at random or due to food advantages, but a study led by Macquarie University concluded that spotted wobbegongs associate with preferred partners for "social" purposes, and some specimens do not associate at all. The study occurred in a small marine reserve over a 15-month period. Out of the 15 tagged and observed specimens, 14 associated with more than one individual, and sex, size, or familiarity did not affect the association of groups. Rob Harcourt, a researcher, stated "What we found was that sharks were interacting in a much more complex way than we predicted".

Females give birth in the spring, after a gestation period of almost a year. The species exhibits ovoviviparity, with embryos developing inside their mother's body until ready to hatch. Litters typically contain between 20–37 individuals. Male wobbegongs in Sydney, likely including this species, fight with other males in the breeding season. Males have also been observed to bite females during courtship. Young are 21 centimetres (8.3 in) long directly after hatching and males become sexually mature when they reach roughly 60 centimetres (24 in).

== Distribution ==
The spotted wobbegong is endemic to Australia, usually living in tropical waters no deeper than 218 metres (715 ft). 38 specimens caught from 1882 to 1995 were found in waters 20–176 metres (66–577 ft) deep. Sightings have been reported in Queensland, Victoria, South Australia, and Western Australia, in the western Pacific Ocean and eastern Indian Ocean. Records are also known of the species living in Tasmania and the Northern Territory, but these are likely to be invalid. Some records have misidentified other fish species living in Japan and the South China Sea as this species.

The species' primary threat in eastern Australia is fishing for commercial purposes. Its flesh is edible and has thus caused it to be a target of fishing. In Queensland, it is sometimes caught as a bycatch but is not fished for intentionally. Its skin has been utilised for decorating historically, but whether it is utilised in such a way currently is unknown. Multiple conservation actions have taken place for this species, particularly since 2006. It is unknown if its population is decreasing or increasing, but it is not severely fragmented as of 2015. It is listed as a species of least concern on the Red List of the International Union for Conservation of Nature as of 23 March 2015, after having been assessed as near threatened in 2003 and 2009.

== Relationship with humans ==
=== Bite ===
Although the spotted wobbegong is generally docile with humans, it is sometimes aggressive with them. Its defence mechanism is a bite, which can cause severe wounds due to the species' tendency to hold its bite for a long time. Reports are known of it attacking people if they step on it or put a limb near its mouth. Divers sometimes pull it by the tail during its daytime resting period, which often provokes it enough to bite. The species can attack if caught with a fishing line or net, or if speared. In one circumstance, a spotted wobbegong specimen bit off a fisherman's foot. It may also attack a human holding a speared or hooked fish, as well as the fish itself. In 1789, Arthur Phillip, the first governor of New South Wales, wrote about the spotted wobbegong, which he called "Watts's Shark", in his book Voyage to Botany Bay. He said that it ferociously attacked the dog of "Mr. Watts":

... after having lain on the deck for two hours seemingly quiet, on Mr Watts's dog passing by, the shark sprang on it with all the ferocity imaginable, and seized it by the leg, nor could the dog have disengaged himself had not the people near at hand come to his assistance

There have been reports of unprovoked attacks on humans, including divers well above the bottom, while Compagno noted of such reports that "it is often difficult to determine which species was involved or what the precise circumstances were that led to the incident". The International Shark Attack File lists 4 unprovoked attacks, (Note: The International Shark Attack File defines a provoked attack as one "when a human initiates interaction with a shark in some way. These include instances when divers are bitten after harassing or trying to touch sharks, attacks on spearfishers, attacks on people attempting to feed sharks, bites occurring while unhooking or removing a shark from a fishing net, etc":) known to be by the spotted wobbegong, none of which were fatal. In total, the Australian Shark Attack File has recorded 51 instances where the unprovoked attack, (Note: The Australian Shark Attack File defines a provoked attack as one "where the person involved was fishing for, spearing, stabbing, feeding, netting or handling a shark, or where the shark was attracted to the victim by activities such as fishing, spear-fishing and cleaning of captured fish".) on a human was confirmed to be by any species of wobbegong shark in the years 1900 to 2009, none of which were fatal. Reports of wobbegongs biting boats are known in literature, but it has not been confirmed that these attacks were by the spotted wobbegong in particular.

== Predation ==
Potential predators of spotted wobbegongs include any large fish or marine mammal.

== Conservation status ==
The spotted wobbegong was nominated for listing under the EPBC Act as a vulnerable species in 2013, but the nomination was rejected. Threats to wobbegong include trawl fishing, beach seines, gillnets, lobster pots and traps, targeting by hook-and-line and spearfishing.

Circa 2013, the IUCN Red List described the species as vulnerable in the waters of New South Wales and Near Threatened in Australian waters. Spotted wobbegongs are bycatch species in various fisheries and are allowed to be fished by recreational fishers in some Australian states, as per the table below:

Fishing restrictions on spotted wobbegongs by region
| State | Recreational bag/possession limit | Note | References |
|---|---|---|---|
| New South Wales | 0 | Commercial fishers are limited to 6 per day and minimum length of 130 cm. | |
| Victoria | 1 | Limit is "one shark per person" of any species. No commercial targeting occurs here. | |
| South Australia | No limit | Listed as "in peril" by Conservation SA. | |
| Western Australia | 2 | Limit is "two sharks per person" of any combination of species. | |
| Queensland | 1 | Limit is "one shark per person" of any species, with a maximum length of 1.5 m. | |

== See also ==
- List of sharks
