= Annea =

Annea may refer to:

- Annea (plant), a genus of plants in the family Fabaceae
- Annea (fish), a fossil genus of sharks in the unidentified family, order Orectolobiformes
