= Orectolobus reticulatus =

Network wobbegong

Conservation status
- Least Concern (IUCN 3.1)

Scientific classification
- Kingdom: Animalia
- Phylum: Chordata
- Class: Chondrichthyes
- Subclass: Elasmobranchii
- Division: Selachii
- Order: Orectolobiformes
- Family: Orectolobidae
- Genus: Orectolobus
- Species: O. reticulatus

Binomial name
- Orectolobus reticulatus Last, Pogonoski & W. T. White, 2008
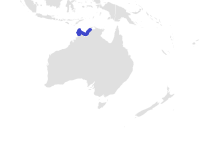
- Known range of the network wobbegong (in blue)

Species of shark

Orectolobus reticulatus, the network wobbegong, is a recently described species of carpet shark found in relatively shallow waters off Kimberley and Darwin in north-western Australia. With a known maximum length of only 52.3 centimetres (20.6 in), it may be the smallest species of wobbegong. Until its description in 2008, it had been confused with the northern wobbegong. The network wobbegong has a short snout, broad head, elongated body, and two dorsal fins, with the first being slightly larger than the second. Its body is grayish brown with darker brown markings and a pale yellow underbelly. The network wobbegong lives in shallow waters along reefy bottoms.

The reproductive strategies of this species are not known, but other Orectolobus species are oviparous and have slow reproductive cycles. Its dentition indicates that the diet of the network wobbegong consists predominantly of small fishes, as well as some cephalopods and crustaceans, such as lobsters and crabs.

== Anatomy and morphology ==
Orectolobus reticulatus is a member of the small subgroup of wobbegongs, otherwise known as carpet sharks. Their bold markings, symmetrical patterns, and flattened appearance resemble a carpet, hence the name. Orectolobus reticulatus has simple dermal lobes that line its upper lip and act as camouflage for prey. The lobes are weed-like whiskers surrounding the jaw and act as sensory barbs. Their dermal lobes are mostly grey, and their ventral lobes appear slightly paler. The patterned dark spots that cover their body, in addition to the pale yellow saddles and fine reticulations, aid in camouflage against predators and prey. The sides of the head of the Orectolobus reticulatus have fine white spots and dark reticulates. The back of the head has dark, brownish black spots that are slightly smaller than their eyes. The rest of their body has four distinct dark markings that run along the tops of their back. The differences in morphology between Orectolobus reticulatus and other similar species can be noted in their size. Orectolobus reticulatus have smaller dorsal fins, a shorter head, and longer snout vent length compared to other wobbegong sharks. The largest Orectolobus reticulatus measured was a female at 523 mm total length.

== Distribution and habitat ==
The network wobbegong is endemic to the coast of Northwestern Australia. Specimens have been collected from Louis Island, Long Reef, and Darwin Harbour. Network wobbegongs live in very shallow water along the continental shelf, not exceeding depths of 20 m. Based on areas where the specimens were caught for study, it is suspected that network wobbegongs live in caves and ledges on rocky or coral reefs. These habitats are also known to be occupied by Orectolobus wardi, a closely related species.

== Behavior ==
Wobbegong shark species are nocturnal and hunt at night. They have a slower metabolism compared to other sharks. The diet of the wobbegong shark primarily consists of small bony fish, but they have also been known to consume cephalopods, lobsters, and crab. Octopuses are more frequently found in the diet of smaller Orectolobus due to their ability to reach small crevices. The bottom-dwelling sharks are able to capture their prey by blending into their surroundings. Their rock and sediment-like color patterns allow them to camouflage until their prey is close enough to be attacked. The teeth of the Orectolobus reticulatus are sharp and fang-like, and their heavy jaws induce a powerful bite.

Orectolobus reticulatus is a newly discovered Orectolobidae species, and no male Orectolobus reticulatus has been observed. However, it is assumed that their breeding and reproduction may be comparable to their fellow Orectolobidae. While also lacking extensive research and understanding, Orectolobidae are known to have a slow reproductive cycle, as embryos are only produced every 3 years. Like many other shark species, males will insert one clasper into the cloaca of the female shark and release sperm. The litters of Orectolobidae are large and can produce up to 37 pups in one litter

== Taxonomy ==
The network wobbegong was discovered by a team of scientists at the Commonwealth Scientific and Industrial Research Organisation (CSIRO) in 2008. The specimens collected were originally believed to be northern wobbegongs (Orectolobus wardi), but their distinctive coloring and morphological differences (notably a shorter head and smaller dorsal fins) led them to be classified as a new species. To date, 4 specimens of the network wobbegong have been collected, with one being released back into the ocean. Its name reticulatus is derived from the Latin for net-like or netted, referring to the network pattern on its dorsal surface.
