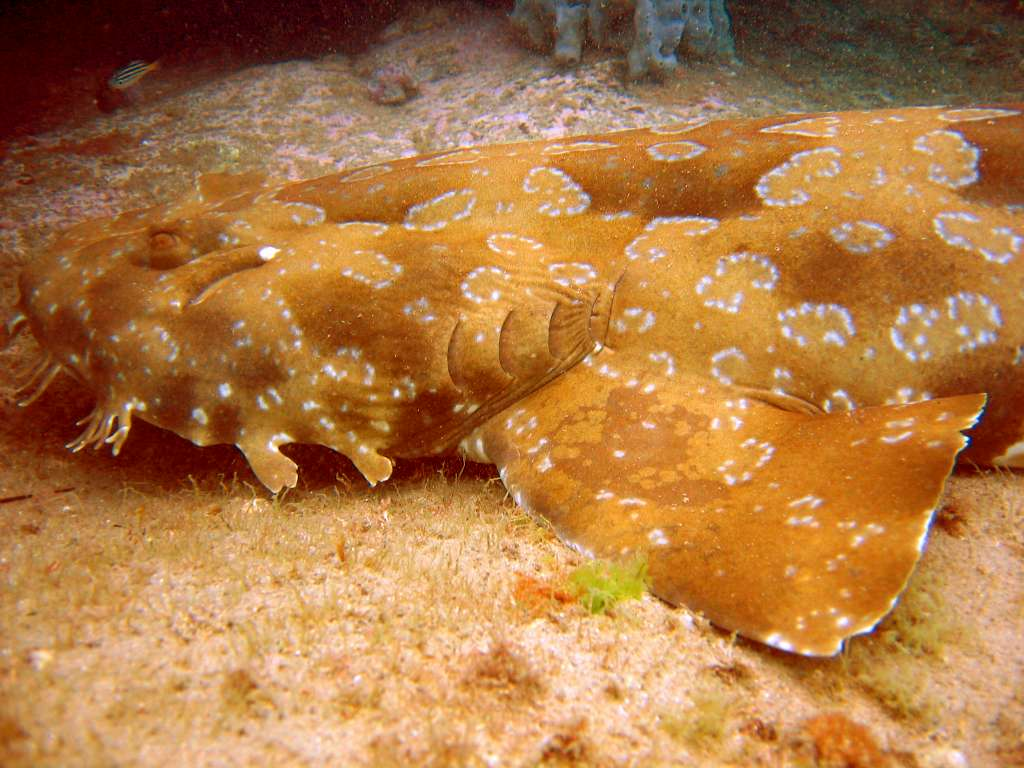
- Spotted wobbegong, Orectolobus maculatus, showing the camouflage pattern and skin flaps typical of wobbegongs

Scientific classification
- Kingdom: Animalia
- Phylum: Chordata
- Class: Chondrichthyes
- Subclass: Elasmobranchii
- Division: Selachii
- Order: Orectolobiformes
- Family: Orectolobidae; T. N. Gill, 1896

Genera
- Eucrossorhinus; Orectolobus; Sutorectus

= Wobbegong =

Wobbegong Temporal range: Upper Jurassic–recent

Family of sharks

Wobbegong is the common name given to the 12 species of carpet shark in the family Orectolobidae. They are coined "carpet sharks" because of the bold markings and patterns that resemble carpets, allowing them to blend into their environment. The word wobbegong is thought to come from Dharug, an Australian Aboriginal language, and means shaggy beard, referring to the growths around the mouth of the shark.

They are found in shallow temperate and tropical waters of the western Pacific Ocean and eastern Indian Ocean, chiefly around Australia and Indonesia, although one species (the Japanese wobbegong, Orectolobus japonicus) occurs as far north as Japan. Wobbegongs have adopted an ambush hunting style, aided by their ability to camouflage combined with their incredible ability of electroreception.

Although there may be small differences between species, Wobbegongs are viviparous, meaning they give birth to live young (pups) in groups (litters). Species, even those known as sympatric, may have differently sized litters--from 9-45--that develop over a Triennial Ovarian Cycle. Reproduction, among many areas of research, can be difficult to study. Captivity presents research opportunities that can then alter public perception, human interactions, understanding of these creatures' habits, which subsequently alters conservation practices.

== Description ==
Wobbegongs are bottom-dwelling sharks, spending much of their time resting on the sea floor. Most species have a maximum length of 1.25 m (4.1 ft), but the largest, the spotted wobbegong, Orectolobus maculatus, and banded wobbegong, O. halei, reach about 3 m (9.8 ft) in length.

Wobbegongs are well camouflaged by a symmetrical pattern of bold markings resembling a carpet. Because of this striking pattern, wobbegongs and their close relatives are often referred to as carpet sharks.

The camouflage is improved by the presence of small, weed-like dermal lobes surrounding the wobbegong's jaw, which help to camouflage it and act as sensory barbs. Wobbegongs make use of their camouflage to hide among rocks and catch smaller fish that swim too close, typical of ambush predators. Wobbegongs also have powerful jaws with long, needle-like teeth to assist in catching reef fish and other sharks for food.

== Habitat and Distribution ==
Primarily, several species of wobbegong shark can be found inhabiting coastal areas around Australia, and Indonesia. The Japanese Wobbegong can be found in the coastal waters off of Japan.

Wobbegongs are an endemic species, meaning they live in specific areas and cannot be found anywhere else in the world. These areas may contain specific characteristics such as ocean acidity, weather patterns, vegetation, climate and temperature, species diversity, and more.

The categorization of an endemic species also implies that, unlike other sharks such as the Great White, Wobbegongs sharks very rarely, if at all, migrate seasonally and are unlikely to travel long distances outside of their habitat. Primarily, Wobbegongs are found in temperate waters and coastal rocky reefs in the Western Pacific and East Indian Ocean, specifically around Australia and Indonesia. Although, Orectolobus Japonicus, more commonly referred to as the Japanese Wobbegong, is known to inhabit in the coastal waters of Japan. Various studies have placed species such as Orectolobus Ornatus, Orectolobus Halei, and Orectobolus Maculatus in the waters around New South Australia. Furthermore, the habitat of Wobbegongs includes sharks of all stages, from juvenile to adult.

== Diet ==
Wobbegongs are ambush predators, meaning they wait for their prey, and attack within a moment's notice. Overall, the diets of Wobbegong sharks consist of bony fish, cephalopods, and chondrichthyans. Furthermore, there may be slight differences in the ratio of organisms consumed in each class depending on the specific species of Wobbegong and the habitat they exist in.

The ability to detect electricity signals is known to aid predators in prey detection, possibly allowing Wobbegong sharks, as ambush predators, to be more accurate in their eating habits. Certain species, such as O. Halei have been noted to consume other Wobbegongs, such as O. Ornatus. Note: although both sharks fall under the family (Orectolobidae), such acts are not considered cannibalism because of the evolutionary distinction between species. Alternatively, newly born pups eating their litter mates would be considered cannibalism as they fall under the same species.

== Electroreception ==
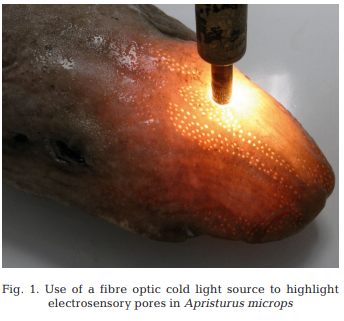
Ampullae on a catshark. The dots being illuminated are small pores filled with gel that allow the shark to sense electricity signals of other organisms.

Ampullae Lorenzini are small, gel filled pores found on the dorsal and ventral sides of Wobbegong sharks.They connect to ampullary organs found within Wobbegongs and other sharks alike. These ampullae aid the shark in electroreception and therefore can be used for many things: prey detection, detection of predators, navigation, and magnetoreception. Electroreception is the process of detecting electrical signals in the environment, whether the electricity signals are coming from living organisms or non-living things. Electroreception has re-evolved on multiple occasions, suggesting how the ability of electroreception is an important survival tool for the Wobbegong shark.

== Reproduction ==
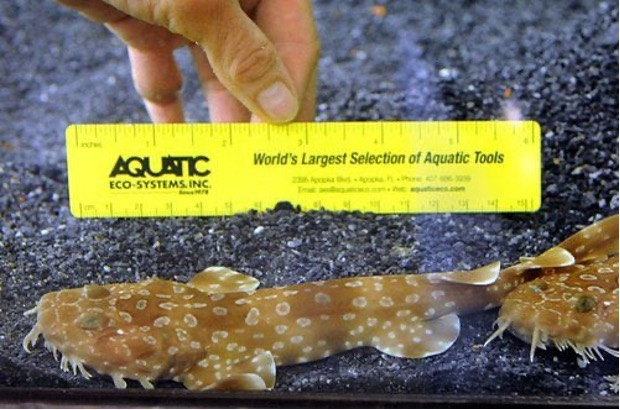
Juvenile Cobbler Wobbegong. Wobbegong sharks are viviparous, meaning they give birth to live pups, rather than laying eggs.

Wobbegong sharks have little research on their reproductive habits, yet reproductive knowledge of a species is necessary to determine their conservation status or altogether existence.

In females of a viviparous species, including Wobbegongs, fertilized eggs develop into embryos inside their body, and they eventually give birth to live pups. A litter of pups may range anywhere from 9-45 depending on the species of Wobbegong. Oretolobus Ornatus was observed to have a relatively smaller litter size (9) compared to that of Orectolobus Maculatus (21) and Oretolobus Halei (30-45).

In terms of reproductive cycle, the embryos of Wobbegongs develop over three periods, the first two ranging 10-12 months each. The stages are characterized by the appearance of the gonad follicles in relation to their stage of pregnancy, this is referred to as a Triennial Ovarian Cycle. According to the study: Reproductive Synchrony of 3 Sympatric Species of Wobbegong Shark, the first stage is non-pregnant female with ovaries and pale translucent follicles, lasting a period of approximately 10-11 months. The second stage consists of a non-pregnant female with large yolky follicles, lasting a period of approximately 12 months. Then finally, the third stage consists of a pregnant female, where embryonic growth occurs rapidly.The studies by Charlie Huveneers, Terrance Walker, Nicholas Otway, Rob Harcourt, and M. Ellis suggest that reproduction of O. Ornatus, O. Maculatus, and O. Halei is in sync between these species, meaning they usually share the same reproductive seasons and stages of embryonic development. However, it is also important to note that reproductive cycles including the specific duration of embryonic development and seasonal timelines may differ between species (Phenology), dependent on interspecies differences and location differences.

== Interaction with humans ==
Wobbegongs are generally not considered dangerous to humans but have attacked swimmers, surfers, snorkelers, and scuba-divers, who inadvertently come close to them. The Australian Shark Attack File contains more than 50 records of unprovoked attacks by wobbegongs since 1900 and the International Shark Attack File has 38 records, none of them fatal. Wobbegongs have many small but sharp teeth, and their bite can be severe, even through a wetsuit. Once attached via bite, they have been known to hang on and can be very difficult to remove.

Overall, sharks--including wobbegongs--are significantly impacted by human interaction Since 1991, Wobbegong sharks found in New South Wales have been commercially fished as food source in Australia. They are also commercially fished and sold as fillets to Japan, China and Malaysia.

Shark interaction with humans does not only encapsulate the explicit interactions, but the implicit as well. Over time, shark-human interactions have increased through commercial fishing, oceanic based activities such as surfing and swimming, along with ecological research and easily accessible public aquariums. However, the interactions may be presented to the public as aggressive shark attacks through media and underrepresented research. When considering how traumatic experiences may lead to biased recollection, increases in species misidentification, and further altering public perception, specific identification technology such as Drone Monitoring as suggested by Kim L. Monteforte et al., and DNA Sequencing as suggested in the study Who Bit the Boat? have become more central in monitoring shark-human interaction. Negative public perception can impact the effectiveness of environmental conservation, beach management, safety measures, and the economy through commercial fishing and tourism rates.

=== Captivity ===
In many instances, captivity can extend opportunities for scientific research to occur. Criteria such as reproduction, gestation, and behavioral analysis can be more clearly identified from organisms in captivity rather than in their natural habitat.

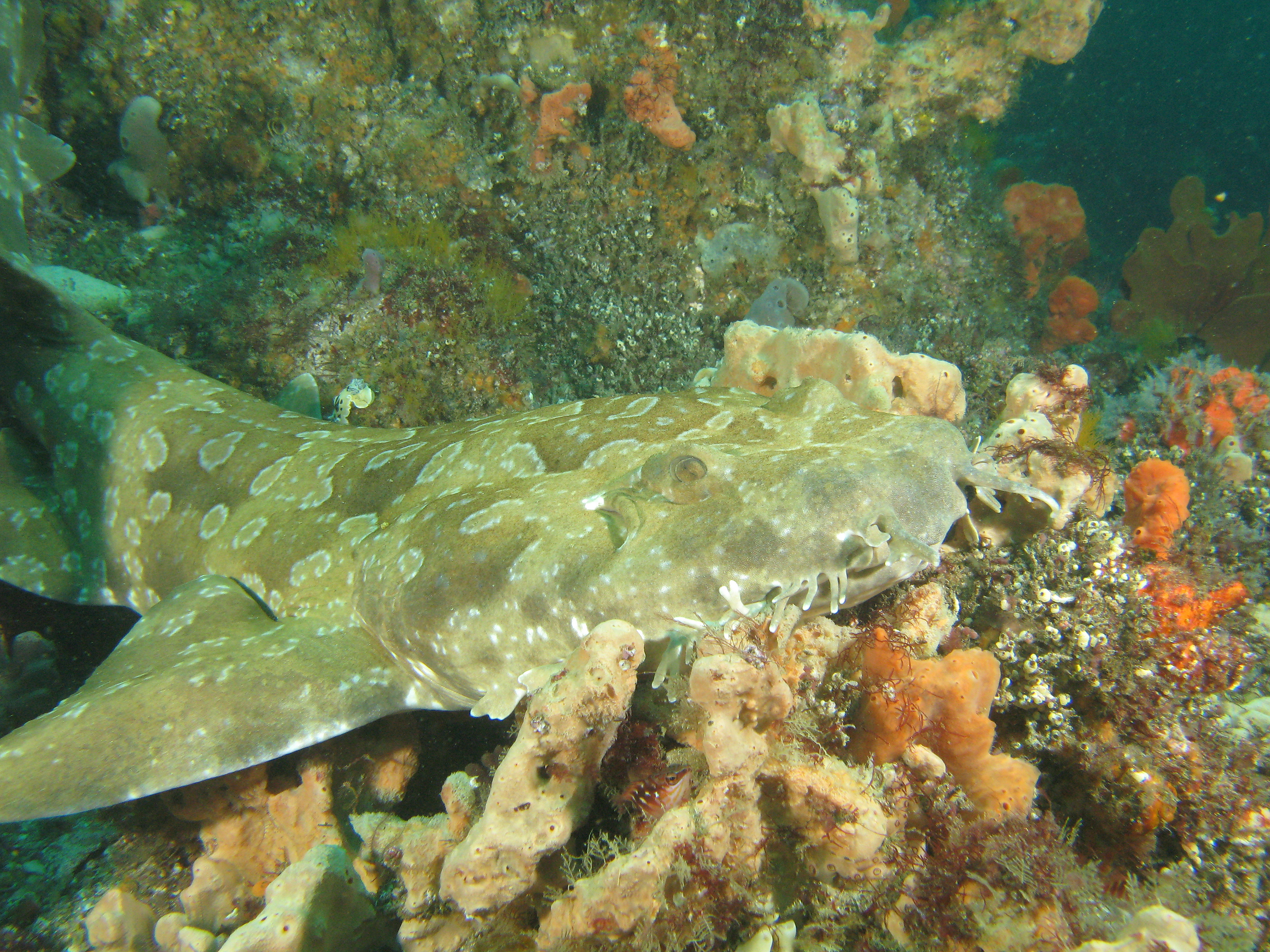
Orectolobus Maculatus in a Resting State

Although most wobbegong species are unsuitable for home aquaria owing to their large adult size, this has not stopped some of the smaller species from being sold in the aquarium trade. Small wobbegong species, such as the tasselled wobbegong and Ward's wobbegong, may be deemed "ideal" sharks for home aquarists to keep because they are an appropriate size and are lethargic, resting for most of the day because of their nocturnal nature. Some aquarists, by contrast, see the lack of activity to be a drawback to keeping wobbegongs and prefer more active sharks. However, there are considerable challenges to maintaining Wobbegongs in captivity. First, replicating the sharks' habitat as closely as possible, providing enough caves, coral, and vegetation so the Wobbegongs may express their natural behaviors. Providing ample stimulation and cover for them can be extensive and expensive. Secondly, likely due to their predatory nature, compatibility with other marine organisms is slim; wobbegongs have been known to consume their fellow tank-mates who are smaller, displaying acts of aggression that are difficult to maintain.

== Genera and species ==
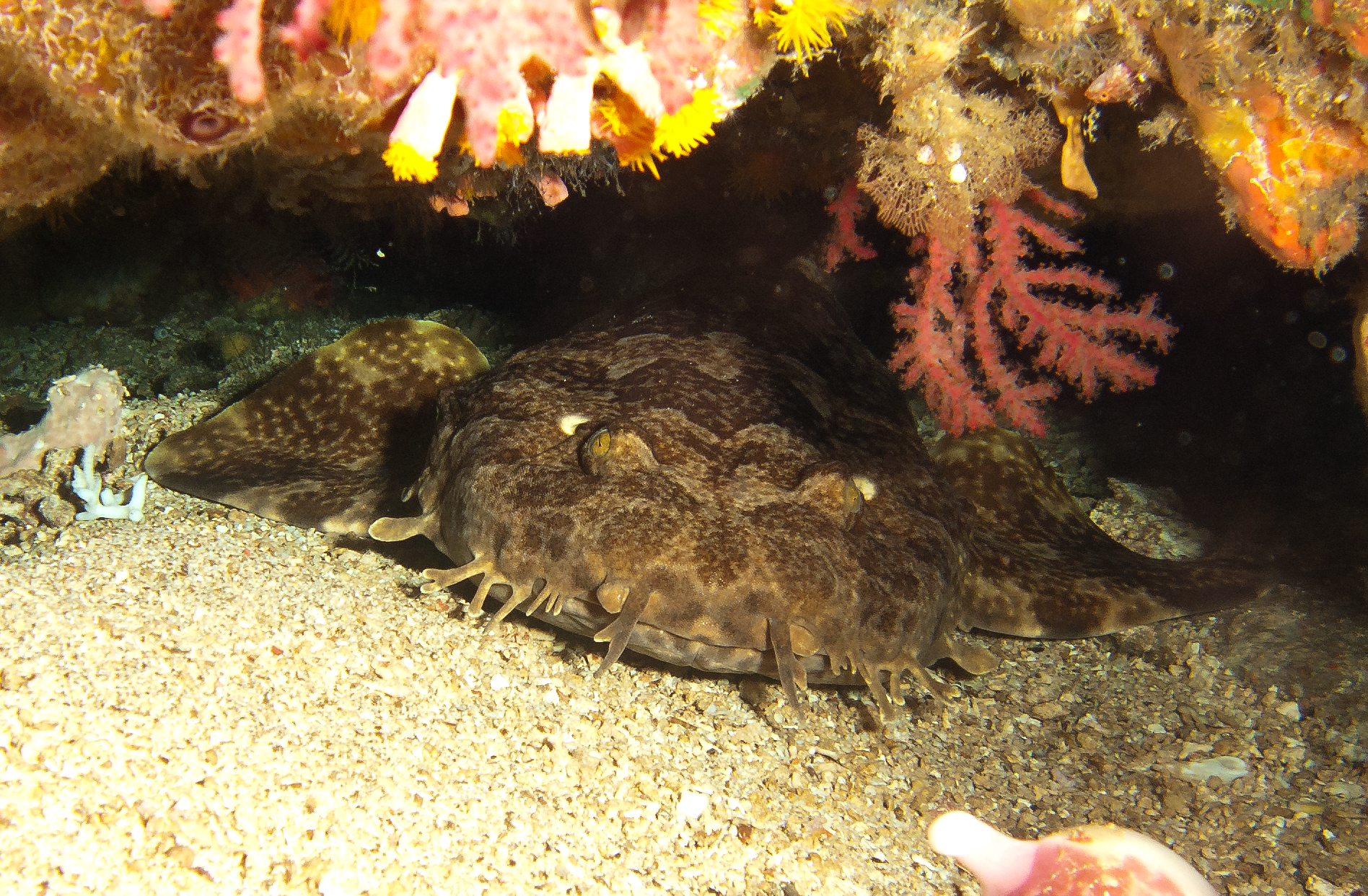
Orectolobus leptolineatus

Wobbegongs classification as identified by the IUCN Red List is as follows:

- Kingdom: Animalia
  - Phylum: Chordata
    - Class: Chondrichthyes
      - Order: Orectolobiformes
        - Family: Orectolobolidae
          - Genus: Eucrossorhinus, Orectolobus, and Stuorectus

The 12 living species of wobbegong, in three genera, are:

- Genus Eucrossorhinus Regan, 1908
  - Eucrossorhinus dasypogon (Bleeker, 1867) (Tasselled Wobbegong)
- Genus Orectolobus Bonaparte, 1834
  - Orectolobus floridus Last & Chidlow, 2008 (Floral Banded Wobbegong)
  - Orectolobus halei Whitley, 1940. (Gulf wobbegong or Banded wobbegong)
  - Orectolobus hutchinsi Last, Chidlow, & Compagno, 2006. (Western Wobbegong)
  - Orectolobus japonicus Regan, 1906 (Japanese Wobbegong)
  - Orectolobus leptolineatus Last, Pogonoski & W. T. White, 2010 (Indonesian Wobbegong)
  - Orectolobus maculatus (Bonnaterre, 1788) (Spotted Wobbegong)
  - Orectolobus ornatus (De Vis, 1883) (Ornate Wobbegong)
  - Orectolobus parvimaculatus Last & Chidlow, 2008 (Dwarf Spotted Wobbegong)
  - Orectolobus reticulatus Last, Pogonoski, & W. T. White, 2008 (Network Wobbegong)
  - Orectolobus wardi Whitley, 1939 (Northern Wobbegong)
- Genus Sutorectus Whitley, 1939
  - Sutorectus tentaculatus (W. K. H. Peters, 1864) (Cobbler Wobbegong)

Fossil genera include:

- Cretorectolobus Case, 1978
- Eometlaouia Noubhani & Cappetta, 2002
- Orectoloboides Cappetta, 1977

== Conservation status ==
Conservation Status of Extant Wobbegong Species
Species	Common name(s)	IUCN Red List status	Population trend	Reference
Eucrossorhinus dasypogon	Tasselled Wobbegong	Least concern	Stable	
Orectolobus floridus	Floral Banded wobbegong	Least concern	Stable	
Orectolobus halei	Gulf wobbegong, Banded wobbegong	Fully Recovered	Stable	
Orectolobus hutchinsi	Western Wobbegong	Least concern	Stable	
Orectolobus japonicus	Japanese Wobbegong	Least concern	Decreasing	
Orectolobus leptolineatus	Indonesian Wobbegong	Near threatened	Decreasing	
Orectolobus maculatus	Spotted Wobbegong	Least concern	Unknown	
Orectolobus ornatus	Ornate Wobbegong	Least concern	Unknown	
Orectolobus parvimaculatus	Dwarf Spotted Wobbegong	Least concern	Stable	
Orectolobus reticulatus	Network Wobbegong	Least concern	Stable	
Orectolobus wardi	Northern Wobbegong	Least concern	Stable	
Sutorectus tentaculatus	Cobbler Wobbegong	Least concern	Unknown	

== See also ==
- List of sharks
- Carpet shark
