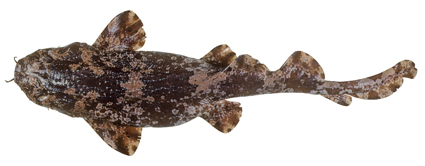

Conservation status
- Least Concern (IUCN 3.1)

Scientific classification
- Kingdom: Animalia
- Phylum: Chordata
- Class: Chondrichthyes
- Subclass: Elasmobranchii
- Division: Selachii
- Order: Orectolobiformes
- Family: Orectolobidae
- Genus: Sutorectus; Whitley, 1939
- Species: S. tentaculatus

Binomial name
- Sutorectus tentaculatus (W. K. H. Peters, 1864)
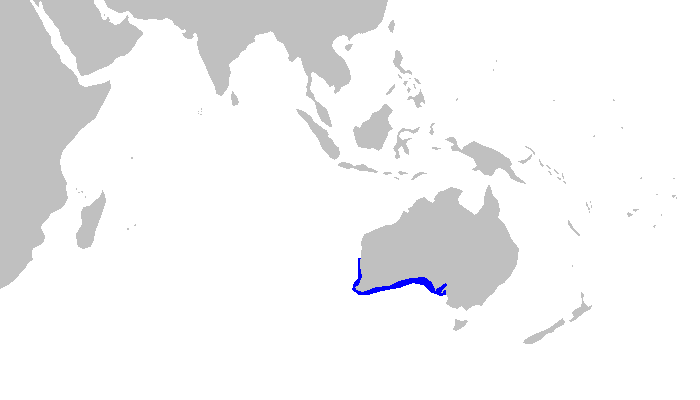
- Range of Cobbler wobbegong (in blue)

= Cobbler wobbegong =

Species of shark

The cobbler wobbegong (Sutorectus tentaculatus) is a carpet shark in the family Orectolobidae, the only member of the genus Sutorectus. It is found in the subtropical eastern Indian Ocean around Western Australia between latitudes 26° S and 35° S. It is frequently found in rocky and coral reef areas. Cobbler wobbegongs reach a length of 92 cm (36 in). It has unbranched dermal lobes on the head, rows of warty tubercles along the back and black spots on the body and fins.

== Morphology and ancestral relations ==
Cobbler wobbegongs are a small species of carpet shark (given the name because of the carpet-like patterns on the skin), Orectolobiformes, that are capable of growing to a size of 92 cm (36 in) in total length. The size at birth of these sharks is approximately 22 cm (9 in) total length, with males maturing at a length of about 65 cm (26 in) total.

Based upon morphology, Sutorectus is placed ancestral to Eucrossorhinus, also known as the tasseled wobbegong. Sutorectus and/or Eucrossorhinus are clustered together with Orectolobus in all of the six equally parsimonious trees. Orectolobus is also paraphyletic with respect to Eucrossorhinus and Sutorectus according to molecular data, meaning that they share a common ancestor. The type of genus of the family, Orectolobus, could only be considered monophyletic with the inclusion of S. tentaculatus and E. dasypogon. In most orectolobiforms, the pectoral radials are primarily composed of three components—the cleithrum, coracoid, and scapula. Typically, the pectoral radials are short, with long ceratotrichia distally, aplesodic style. Wobbegongs are dorso-ventrally flattened, demersal sharks that can be distinguished from other elasmobranch families by the presence of warty dermal lobes or tubercles on the lateral sides of the head, as well as the dorsal surface of the shark. These dermal tubercles provide excellent camouflage to blend in with surrounding rocks of the reef. The variegated color pattern of the skin is composed primarily of a dark brown base interspaced with light areas with irregular dark spots. Sutorectus tentaculatus is also readily identified by the presence of short dorsal fins relative to the height of the body of the shark, with the first dorsal-fin originating from the front of the pelvic-fin midbase. Other identifiable features include, but are not limited to, their unbranched nasal barbels, symphysial groove on the chin, and dorsal saddles with jagged corrugated edges.

== Diet and mouth structure ==
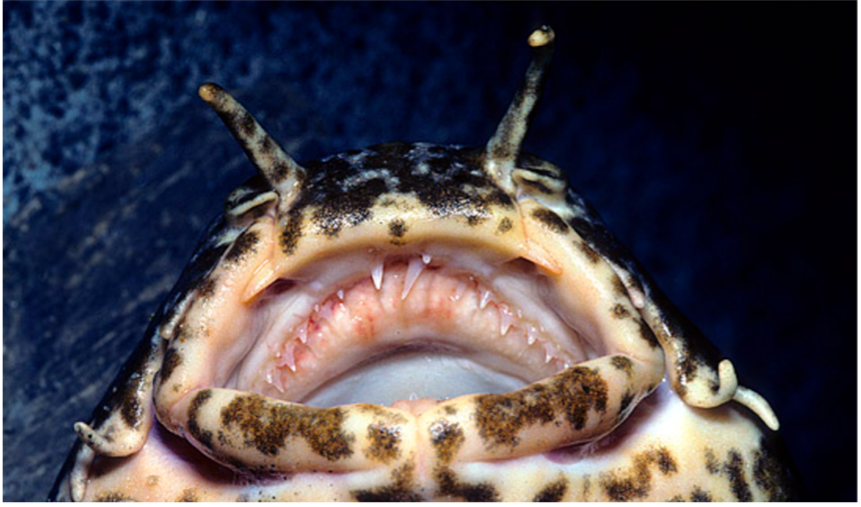
Cobbler wobbegong upward mouth and teeth

The mouth morphology contribute to how the species eats and the food that they consume. Cobbler wobbegongs have two rows of enlarged fang-like teeth in the upper jaw and three rows in the lower jaw. The mouth is positioned in front of the eyes, giving them an advantage when attacking prey. Wobbegongs are ambush predators, meaning that they hide under the sand or in rocks and wait for their prey to pass by before they attack. The camouflage of their skin significantly impacts their success in this hunting style. The positioning and shape of their teeth, in addition to their heavy jaws, are fit to consume small benthic fish and invertebrates (crabs, lobsters and abalone). The sharp, jagged edges of the teeth allow these sharks to pierce through the thick scales of fishes and hard exteriors of invertebrates.

== Habitat ==
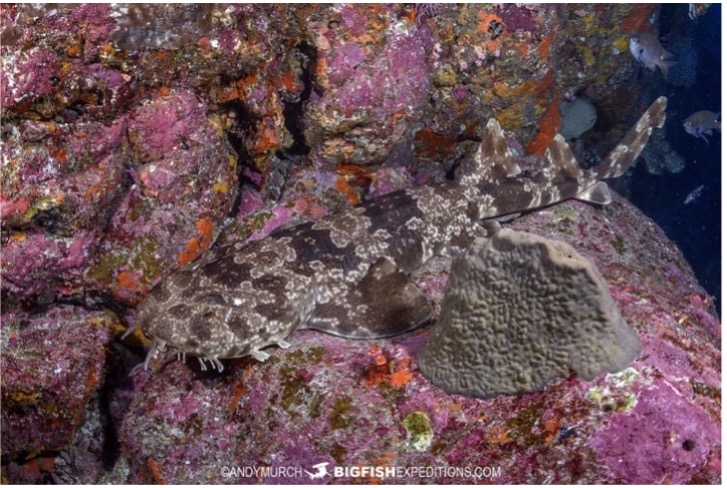
Cobbler wobbegong camouflaged against rock

The Cobbler wobbegong is typically found in rocky reefs and weedy areas at a depth of about 35 metres (110 ft). They are endemic to the temperate and tropical continental waters of the western Pacific and eastern Indian oceans but are most diverse in Australian waters. Similar to other wobbegongs, the Cobbler wobbegong does not venture far from its typical parameters. However, some have shown to have short-term fidelity to a site, but are not permanent residents, as they move out of an area over time and are replaced by other temporary residents.

== Threats to population ==
The cobbler wobbegong is a minor bycatch of Western Australian commercial fisheries. The cobbler wobbegong resides within the Southern and Eastern Scalefish and Shark Fishery, however the species is rarely caught by this fishery. Individuals have been caught in trawl nets, however most bycatch is not retained. The bycatch is placed back into the ocean and has a relatively high survival rate after release. Despite being a victim of bycatch, the species does not show any signs of decline. As of February 18, 2015, cobbler wobbegongs have been listed as the status of 'Least concern' by the IUCN Red List. A study was conducted by the West Coast Rock Lobster Managed Fishery (WCRLF) in which the number of individual species of bycatch were recorded. In the 2006/2007 fishing season, an average of 1.69 wobbegong sharks were caught per 1000 pot lifts, with a total of 14,014 individuals per year. In the 2009/2010 fishing season 2.15 wobbegongs were caught per 1000 pot lifts, with a total of 4,745 individuals per year. This study reflects the family of 'Orectolobidae' and does not specify the specific species. With that in mind, these numbers are relatively minute and thus do not have a significant impact on the population of the species. Potential predators of the cobbler wobbegong include the Australian fur seal. Australian fur seals are opportunistic hunters and primarily feed on fish and squid. It is possible for Australian fur seals to seek cobbler wobbegongs as prey, but there have been very few sightings of this. There are not many other predators recorded for this species.

== Reproduction ==
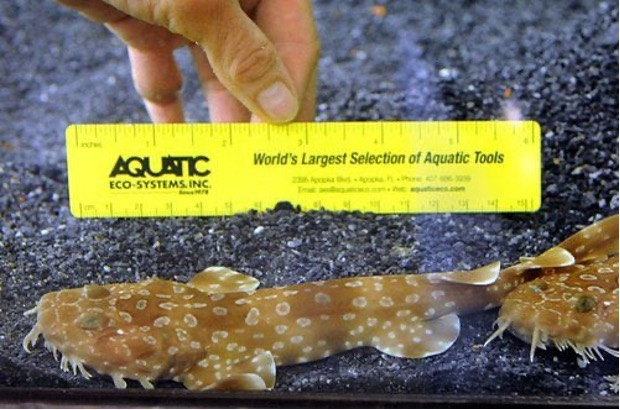
Juvenile Cobbler wobbegong

The cobbler wobbegong is ovoviviparous, meaning that the species produces eggs which develop and hatch within the maternal body. The young sharks are then birthed, giving the appearance of live birth. A pup is typically about 22 cm (8.7 in) in length at birth and will reach sexual maturity at around 60 cm (24 in). One pregnant female was studied, which contained 12 developing embryos with a sex ratio strongly biased towards males. The reproduction of the cobbler wobbegong has not been extensively studied; thus, conclusions can only be drawn from similarly related species. Reproduction of three closely related sympatric species of wobbegong, which include the Orectolobus ornatus, Orectolobus maculatus and Orectolobus halei, have been used to compare the reproductive cycle of Wobbegongs for the use of commercial fisheries. These species had synchronous, triennial reproductive cycles, meaning that they complete their reproductive cycle every three-years. Follicles develop and grow for two years before ovulation. Within the first year, follicles remain small but grow exponentially in the second year before ovulation in November. Gestation occurs between 10-11 months and parturition occurs during September-October. Litter sizes for these species ranged from nine to 21 individuals, with increasing numbers as the female increased in total length.

== See also ==
- List of sharks
