= Orectoloboides =

Orectoloboides Temporal range: Cenomanian

Scientific classification
- Kingdom: Animalia
- Phylum: Chordata
- Class: Chondrichthyes
- Subclass: Elasmobranchii
- Division: Selachii
- Order: Orectolobiformes
- Family: Orectolobidae
- Genus: †Orectoloboides; Cappetta, 1977

Extinct genus of cartilaginous fishes

Orectoloboides is an extinct genus of wobbegong sharks (family Orectolobidae). It was described by Cappetta in 1977. A new species, O. angulatus, was described from the Cenomanian age of Canada by Charlie J. Underwood and Stephen L. Cumbaa in 2010.

== Species ==
- Orectoloboides parvulus (Dalinkevicius, 1935)
- Orectoloboides multistriatus Werner, 1989
- Orectoloboides reyndersi Adnet, 2006
- Orectoloboides angulatus Underwood & Cumbaa, 2010
- Orectoloboides gijseni Herman & Van Den Eeckhaut, 2010

Two species formerly assigned to this genus, O. glashoffi Thies, 1981 and O. pattersoni Thies, 1983, were transferred to the separate genus Ornatoscyllium by Underwood & Ward (2004).
