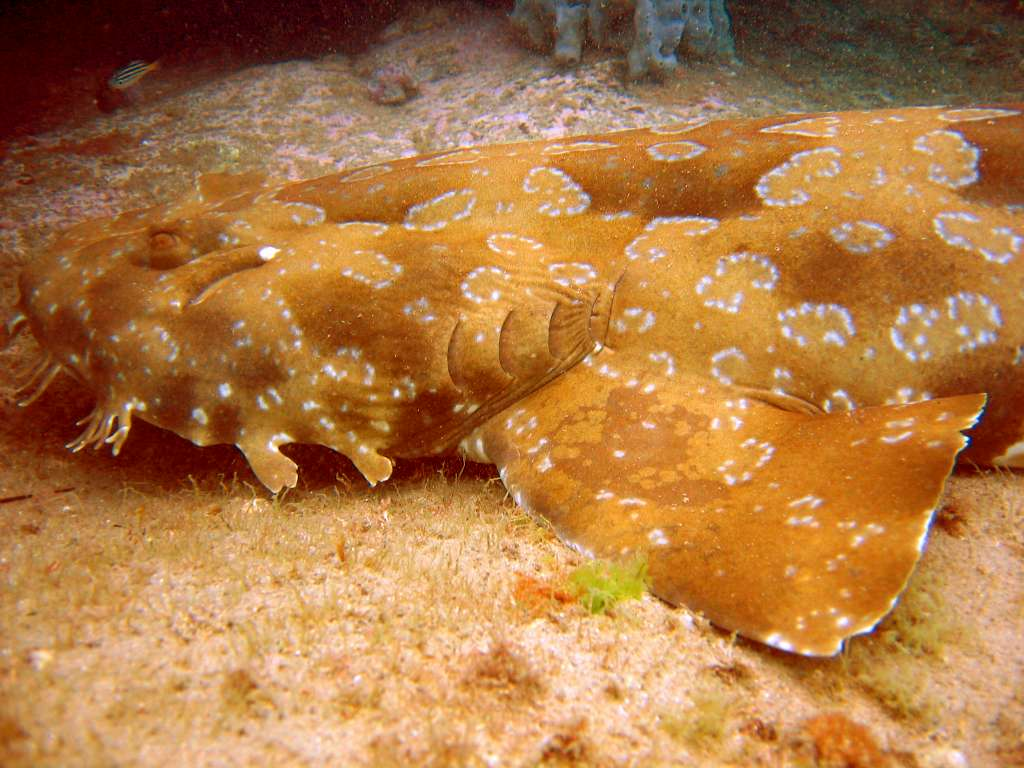
- Spotted wobbegong, Orectolobus maculatus

Scientific classification
- Kingdom: Animalia
- Phylum: Chordata
- Class: Chondrichthyes
- Subclass: Elasmobranchii
- Division: Selachii
- Order: Orectolobiformes
- Family: Orectolobidae
- Genus: Orectolobus; Bonaparte, 1834

Type species
- Squalus maculatus Bonnaterre, 1788

Species
- 10, see text

= Orectolobus =

Genus of sharks

Orectolobus /ɒrɛkˈtɒləbəs/ is a genus of carpet sharks in the family Orectolobidae. They are commonly known as wobbegongs, although this name also applies to the other members of the family. They are found in shallow temperate and tropical waters of the western Pacific Ocean and eastern Indian Ocean, chiefly around Australia and Indonesia, although one species (the Japanese wobbegong, O. japonicus) occurs as far north as Japan.

They have a mottled or spotted cryptic pattern, and have elongated dermal lobes in the region near the mouth. Most have a maximum length of 1.25 m (4.1 ft) or less, but two species, O. halei and O. maculatus, reach about 3 m (9.8 ft) (earlier reports of similar-sized O. ornatus is due to confusion with O. halei). These sluggish ambush predators are typically seen resting on the seafloor, and at least some species are nocturnal. While usually harmless to humans, they have been known to bite, but generally only if stepped on, approached too closely, or provoked.

== Species ==
The species-level taxonomy in this genus has changed significantly in recent years, with one species described in 2006, three species described in 2008, and one in 2010, while O. halei generally was considered a junior synonym of O. ornatus until 2006. The tasselled and cobbler wobbegongs have been included in this genus, but today they are placed in Eucrossorhinus and Sutorectus, respectively.

- Orectolobus floridus Last & Chidlow, 2008 (floral banded wobbegong)
- Orectolobus halei Whitley, 1940 (Gulf wobbegong or banded wobbegong)
- Orectolobus hutchinsi Last, Chidlow & Compagno, 2006 (western wobbegong)
- Orectolobus japonicus Regan, 1906 (Japanese wobbegong)
- Orectolobus leptolineatus Last, Pogonoski & W. T. White, 2010 (Indonesian wobbegong)
- Orectolobus maculatus (Bonnaterre, 1788) (spotted wobbegong)
- Orectolobus ornatus (De Vis, 1883) (ornate wobbegong)
- Orectolobus parvimaculatus Last & Chidlow, 2008 (dwarf spotted wobbegong)
- Orectolobus reticulatus Last, Pogonoski & W. T. White, 2008 (network wobbegong)
- Orectolobus wardi Whitley, 1939 (northern wobbegong)
