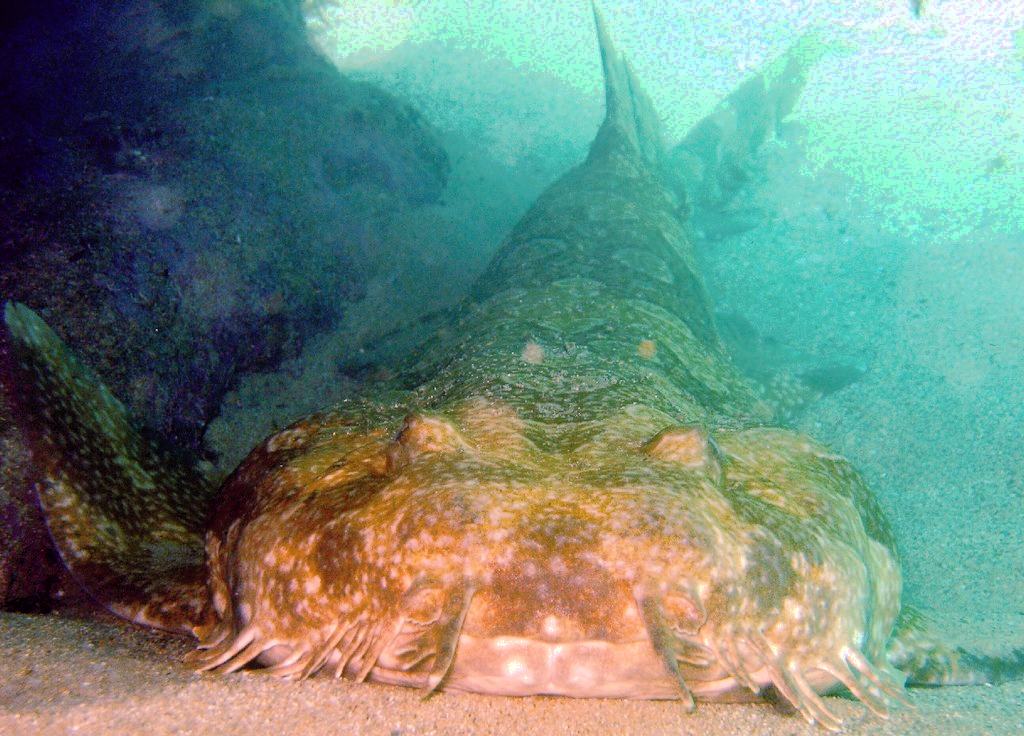
- Spotted wobbegong (Orectolobus maculatus)

Scientific classification
- Kingdom: Animalia
- Phylum: Chordata
- Class: Chondrichthyes
- Subclass: Elasmobranchii
- Division: Selachii
- Superorder: Galeomorphi
- Order: Orectolobiformes; Applegate, 1972

Families
- See text

= Carpet shark =

Carpet sharks Temporal range: Toarcian–Recent

Order of sharks

Carpet sharks are sharks classified in the order Orectolobiformes /ɒrɛkˈtɒləbɪfɔːrmiːz/. Sometimes the common name "carpet shark" (given because many species resemble ornately patterned carpets) is used interchangeably with "wobbegong", which is the common name of sharks in the family Orectolobidae. Carpet sharks have five gill slits, two spineless dorsal fins, and a small mouth that does not extend past the eyes. Many species have barbels.

== Characteristics ==
The carpet sharks are a diverse group of sharks with differing sizes, appearances, diets, and habits. They first appeared in the fossil record in the Early Jurassic; the oldest known orectolobiform genera are Folipistrix (known from Toarcian to Aalenian of Belgium and Germany), Palaeobrachaelurus (Aalenian to Barremian) and Annea (Toarcian to Bajocian of Europe). All species have two dorsal fins and a relatively short, transverse mouth that does not extend behind the eyes. Besides the nostrils are barbels, tactile sensory organs, and grooves known as nasoral grooves connect the nostrils to the mouth. Five short gill slits are just in front of the origin of the pectoral fin and the fifth slit tends to overlap the fourth one. A spiracle occurs beneath each eye which is used in respiration. The only exception to this rule is the whale shark, the spiracles of which are situated just behind the eyes. Carpet sharks derive their common name from the fact that many species have a mottled appearance with intricate patterns reminiscent of carpet designs. The patterning provides camouflage when the fish is lying on the seabed. The largest carpet shark is the whale shark (Rhincodon typus) which can grow to a length of 14 m (46 ft) to 18.8 metres (62 ft). It is the largest species of fish, but despite its size, is not dangerous, as it is a filter feeder, drawing in water through its wide mouth and sifting out the plankton. The smallest carpet shark, at up to about 30 cm (12 in) long, is the barbelthroat carpet shark, (Cirrhoscyllium expolitum). Some of the most spectacularly coloured members of the order are the necklace carpet shark (Parascyllium variolatum), the zebra shark (Stegostoma fasciatum), the Epaulette shark (Hemiscyllium ocellatum), and the ornate wobbegong (Orectolobus ornatus). Nurse sharks and whale sharks have a fringe of barbels on their snouts, and barbelthroat carpet sharks (Cirrhoscyllium expolitum) have barbels dangling from their throat regions.

== Behaviour ==
Most carpet sharks feed on the seabed in shallow to medium-depth waters, detecting and picking up molluscs, crustaceans, and other small creatures. The wobbegongs tend to be ambush predators, lying hidden on the seabed until prey approaches. One has been observed swallowing a bamboo shark whole.

The methods of reproduction of carpet sharks vary. Some species are oviparous and lay eggs which may be liberated directly into the water or may be enclosed in horny egg cases. Some female sharks have been observed to push egg cases into crevices and this would be an added protection for the developing embryos. Other species are ovoviviparous and the fertilised eggs are retained in the mother's oviduct. There, the developing embryos, which are usually few in number, feed on their yolk sacs at first and later hatch out and feed on nutrients secreted by the walls of the oviduct. The young are born in an advanced state, ready to live independent lives.

== Distribution ==
Carpet sharks are found in all the oceans of the world but predominantly in tropical and temperate waters. They are most common in the western Indo-Pacific region and are usually found in relatively deep water.

== Classification ==
The order is small, with seven families in 13 genera and with a total of around 43 species:

Family	Image	Common name	Genera	Species	Description
Brachaeluridae		Blind sharks	1	2	Blind sharks are found in shallow coastal waters up to 110 m (360 ft) deep off the eastern coast of Australia. They are distinguished by the presence of long barbels, large spiracles, and grooves around the nostrils. They have two dorsal fins, placed close together on the back, and a relatively short tail. Blind sharks feed on small fish, cuttlefish, sea anemones, and crustaceans. The female retains the eggs in her body until they hatch (ovoviviparity), during which time the embryos feed solely on the egg yolk. Despite their name, blind sharks are not blind; their name comes from their habit of closing their eyes when taken out of water. There are only two species.
Ginglymostomatidae		Nurse sharks	3	4	Nurse sharks have long tails and distinctive mouths which are far ahead of the eyes and before the snout (subterminal), an indication of the bottom-dwelling (benthic) nature of these sharks. Also present on the lower jaw are two fleshy barbels, chemosensory organs which help the nurse sharks find prey hidden in the sediments. Common in shallow, tropical, and subtropical waters, these sharks are sluggish and docile bottom-dwellers. Nurse sharks typically attack humans only if directly threatened. The largest species can reach a length of 4.3 m (14 ft).
Hemiscylliidae		Bamboo sharks	2 extant 4 extinct	16 extant 6 extinct	Bamboo sharks, sometimes called longtail carpet sharks, are distinguished by a relatively long snout with subterminal nostrils. They are relatively small sharks, with the largest species reaching only 121 cm (48 in) in length. They have elongated, cylindrical bodies, with short barbels and large spiracles. As their common name suggests, they have unusually long tails, exceeding the length of the rest of their bodies. They are found in shallow waters of the tropical Indo-Pacific. They are sluggish fish, feeding on bottom-dwelling invertebrates and smaller fish.
Orectolobidae		Wobbegong sharks	3 extant 1 extinct	12 extant 1 extinct	Wobbegong sharks are well camouflaged with symmetric, bold patterns resembling a carpet. The camouflage is improved by the presence of small weed-like whisker lobes surrounding the jaw, which help to camouflage it and act as sensory barbs. Wobbegongs are bottom-dwelling and spend much time resting on the sea floor. They are found in shallow temperate and tropical waters of the western Pacific Ocean and eastern Indian Ocean, chiefly around Australia and Indonesia. Most species have a maximum length of 1.25 m (4.1 ft) or less, and the largest reach about 3 m (9.8 ft) in length. Wobbegongs are generally not dangerous to humans unless provoked.
Parascylliidae		Collared carpet sharks	2	8	Collared carpet sharks have elongated, slender bodies, cat-like eyes, and barbels behind their chins. They are found only in the shallow waters of the western Pacific. They are relatively small sharks, with the largest species reaching no more than 91 cm (2.99 ft) in adult length.
Rhincodontidae		Whale sharks	1	1	The whale shark is the largest extant fish species, growing over 12 m (40 ft) long and weighing over 20 tonnes (45,000 lb). It is a slow-moving filter feeder with a very large mouth, feeding mainly, though not exclusively, on plankton. The whale shark is a pelagic species, living in the open sea in tropical and warm oceans with a lifespan around 70 years. The IUCN has assessed it as Endangered.
Stegostomatidae		Zebra sharks	1	1	Zebra sharks are distinctive in appearance, with five longitudinal ridges on a cylindrical body, a low caudal fin comprising nearly half the total length, and a pattern of dark spots on a pale background. They grow to a length of 2.5 m (8.2 ft), and are found throughout the tropical Indo-Pacific, frequenting coral reefs and sandy flats to a depth of 62 m (210 ft). They are nocturnal and spend most of the day resting motionless on the sea floor. They are innocuous to humans. The IUCN has assessed them as endangered and their populations are likely in decline.

=== Extant species ===
Order Orectolobiformes

- Family Brachaeluridae Applegate (blind sharks)
  - Genus Brachaelurus Ogilby, 1908
    - Brachaelurus colcloughi (Ogilby, 1908) (bluegrey carpetshark)
    - Brachaelurus waddi (Bloch & J. G. Schneider, 1801) (blind shark)
- Family Ginglymostomatidae Gill, 1862 (nurse sharks)
  - Genus Ginglymostoma J. P. Müller & Henle, 1837
    - Ginglymostoma cirratum Bonnaterre, 1788 (nurse shark)
    - Ginglymostoma unami Del-Moral-Flores, Ramírez-Antonio, Angulo & Pérez-Ponce de León, 2015
  - Genus Nebrius Rüppell, 1837
    - Nebrius ferrugineus (Lesson, 1831) (tawny nurse shark)
  - Genus Pseudoginglymostoma Dingerkus, 1986
    - Pseudoginglymostoma brevicaudatum (Günther, 1867) (short-tail nurse shark)
- Family Hemiscylliidae Gill, 1862 (bamboo sharks)
  - Genus Chiloscyllium J. P. Müller & Henle, 1837
    - Chiloscyllium arabicum Gubanov, 1980 (Arabian carpetshark)
    - Chiloscyllium burmensis Dingerkus & DeFino, 1983 (Burmese bamboo shark)
    - Chiloscyllium griseum J. P. Müller & Henle, 1838 (grey bamboo shark)
    - Chiloscyllium hasselti Bleeker, 1852 (Hasselt's bamboo shark)
    - Chiloscyllium indicum (J. F. Gmelin, 1789) (slender bamboo shark)
    - Chiloscyllium plagiosum (Anonymous, referred to Bennett, 1830) (white-spotted bamboo shark)
    - Chiloscyllium punctatum J. P. Müller & Henle, 1838 (brownbanded bamboo shark)
  - Genus Hemiscyllium J. P. Müller & Henle, 1837
    - Hemiscyllium freycineti (Quoy & Gaimard, 1824) (Indonesian speckled carpetshark)
    - Hemiscyllium galei G. R. Allen & Erdmann, 2008 (Cenderwasih epaulette shark)
    - Hemiscyllium hallstromi Whitley, 1967 (Papuan epaulette shark)
    - Hemiscyllium halmahera G. R. Allen, Erdmann & Dudgeon, 2013 (Halmahera epaulette shark)
    - Hemiscyllium henryi G. R. Allen & Erdmann, 2008 (Henry's epaulette shark)
    - Hemiscyllium michaeli G. R. Allen & Dudgeon, 2010 (Milne Bay epaulette shark)
    - Hemiscyllium ocellatum (Bonnaterre, 1788) (epaulette shark)
    - Hemiscyllium strahani Whitley, 1967 (hooded carpetshark)
    - Hemiscyllium trispeculare J. Richardson, 1843 (speckled carpetshark)
- Family Orectolobidae Gill, 1896 (wobbegong sharks)
  - Genus Eucrossorhinus Regan, 1908
    - Eucrossorhinus dasypogon (Bleeker, 1867) (tasselled wobbegong)
  - Genus Orectolobus Bonaparte, 1834
    - Orectolobus floridus Last & Chidlow, 2008 (floral banded wobbegong)
    - Orectolobus halei Whitley, 1940.
    - Orectolobus hutchinsi Last, Chidlow & Compagno, 2006. (western wobbegong)
    - Orectolobus japonicus Regan, 1906 (Japanese wobbegong)
    - Orectolobus leptolineatus Last, Pogonoski & W. T. White, 2010 (Indonesian wobbegong)
    - Orectolobus maculatus (Bonnaterre, 1788) (spotted wobbegong)
    - Orectolobus ornatus (De Vis, 1883) (ornate wobbegong)
    - Orectolobus parvimaculatus Last & Chidlow, 2008 (dwarf spotted wobbegong)
    - Orectolobus reticulatus Last, Pogonoski & W. T. White, 2008 (network wobbegong)
    - Orectolobus wardi Whitley, 1939 (northern wobbegong)
  - Genus Sutorectus Whitley, 1939
    - Sutorectus tentaculatus (W. K. H. Peters, 1864) (cobbler wobbegong)
- Family Parascylliidae Gill, 1862 (collared carpet sharks)
  - Genus Cirrhoscyllium H. M. Smith & Radcliffe, 1913
    - Cirrhoscyllium expolitum H. M. Smith & Radcliffe, 1913 (barbelthroat carpetshark)
    - Cirrhoscyllium formosanum Teng, 1959 (Taiwan saddled carpetshark)
    - Cirrhoscyllium japonicum Kamohara, 1943 (saddle carpetshark)
  - Genus Parascyllium Gill, 1862
    - Parascyllium collare E. P. Ramsay & Ogilby, 1888 (collared carpetshark)
    - Parascyllium elongatum Last & Stevens, 2008 (elongate carpetshark)
    - Parascyllium ferrugineum McCulloch, 1911 (rusty carpetshark)
    - Parascyllium sparsimaculatum T. Goto & Last, 2002 (ginger carpetshark)
    - Parascyllium variolatum (A. H. A. Duméril, 1853) (necklace carpetshark)
- Family Rhincodontidae (J. P. Müller & Henle, 1839) (whale sharks)
  - Genus Rhincodon A. Smith, 1828
    - Rhincodon typus A. Smith, 1828 (whale shark)
- Family Stegostomatidae Gill, 1862 (zebra sharks)
  - Genus Stegostoma J. P. Müller & Henle, 1837
    - Stegostoma fasciatum (Hermann, 1783) (zebra shark)

=== Fossil genera ===
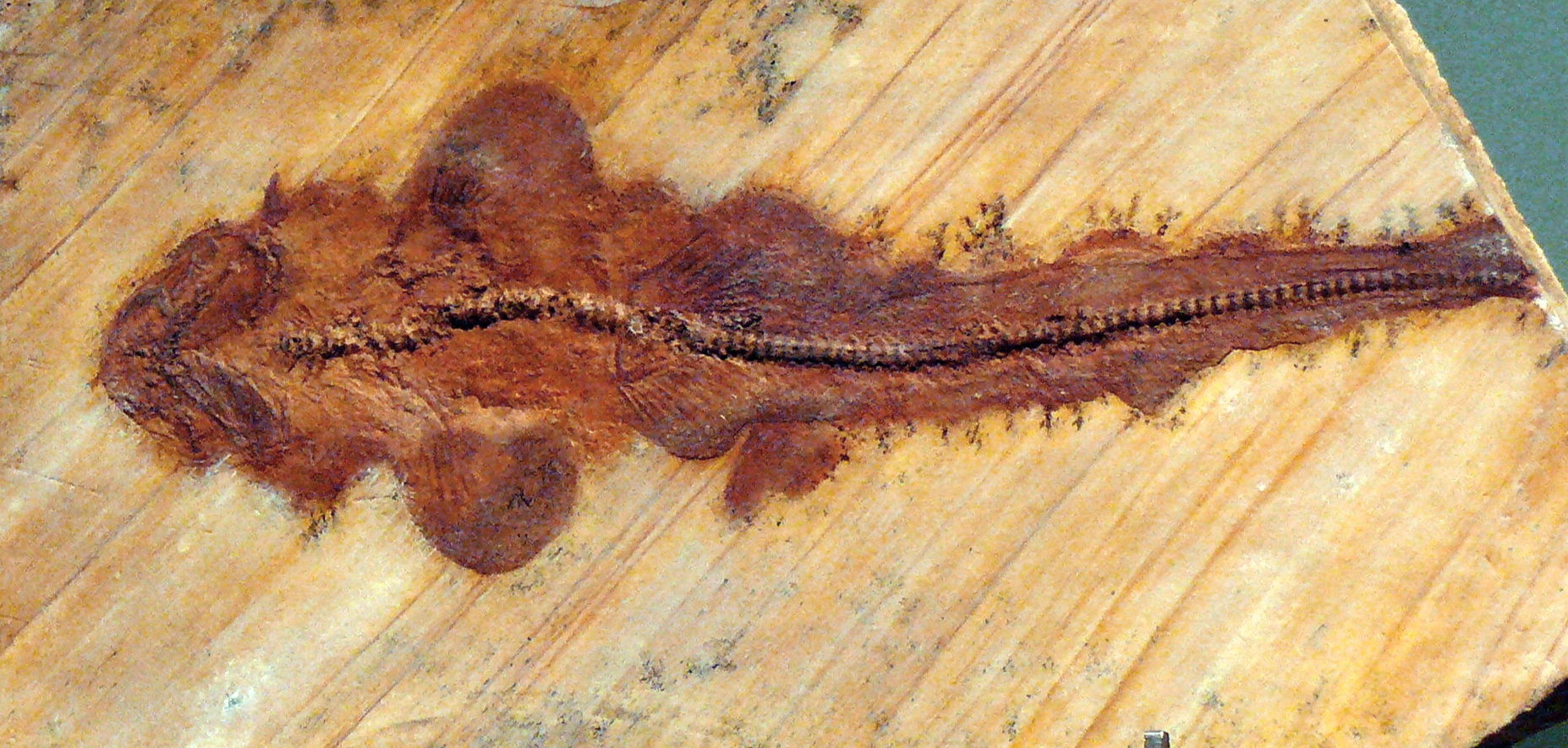
Full body fossil of the Jurassic genus Phorcynis

The following fossil genera are recognized:

- Order Orectolobiformes
  - Genus †Akaimia Rees, 2010
  - Genus †Annea Thies, 1982
  - Genus †Dorsetoscyllium Underwood & Ward, 2004
  - Genus †Galagadon Gates, Gorscak & Makovicky, 2019
  - Genus †Heterophorcynus Underwood & Ward, 2004
  - Genus †Folipistrix Kriwet, 2003
  - Genus †Palaeorectolobus Kriwet, 2008
  - Genus †Parasquatina Herman, 1982
  - Genus †Phorcynis Thiollière, 1854
  - Genus †Similiteroscyllium Fuchs, Engelbrecht, Lukeneder & Kriwet, 2017
  - Family Brachaeluridae
    - Genus †Eostegostoma Herman & Crochard, 1977
    - Genus †Garrigascyllium Guinot et al., 2014
    - Genus †Magistrauia Guinot, Cappetta & Adnet, 2014
    - Genus †Palaeobrachaelurus Thies, 1983
    - Genus †Paraginglymostoma Thies, 1982
    - Genus †Parahemiscyllium Guinot, Cappetta & Adnet, 2014
  - Family Ginglymostomatidae
    - Genus †Cantioscyllium Woodward, 1889
    - Genus †Delpitoscyllium Noubhani & Cappetta, 1997
    - Genus †Ganntouria Noubhani & Cappetta, 1997
    - Genus †Hologinglymostoma Noubhani & Cappetta, 1997
    - Genus †Plicatoscyllium Case & Cappetta, 1997
    - Genus †Protoginglymostoma Herman & Crochard, 1977
  - Family Hemiscyllidae
    - Genus †Acanthoscyllium (Pictet & Humbert, 1966)
    - Genus †Adnetoscyllium Guinot, Underwood, Cappetta & Ward, 2013
    - Genus †Almascyllium Cappetta, 1980
    - Genus †Notaramphoscyllium Engelbrecht, Mörs, Reguero & Kriwet, 2017
    - Genus †Pseudospinax Müller & Diedrich, 1991
  - Family †Mesiteiidae Pfeil, 2021
    - Genus †Mesiteia Gorjanovic-Kramberger, 1885
  - Family Orectolobidae
    - Genus †Cederstroemia Siverson, 1995
    - Genus †Coelometlaouia Engelbrecht, Mörs, Reguero & Kriwet, 2017
    - Genus †Cretorectolobus Case, 1978
    - Genus †Eometlaouia Noubhani & Cappetta, 2002
    - Genus †Gryphodobatis Leidy, 1877
    - Genus †Orectoloboides Cappetta, 1977
    - Genus †Restesia Cook et al., 2014
    - Genus †Squatiscyllium Cappetta, 1980
  - Family Parascyllidae
    - Genus †Pararhincodon Herman in Cappetta, 1976
  - Family Rhincodontidae
    - Genus †Palaeorhincodon Herman, 1974

== See also ==
- List of sharks
