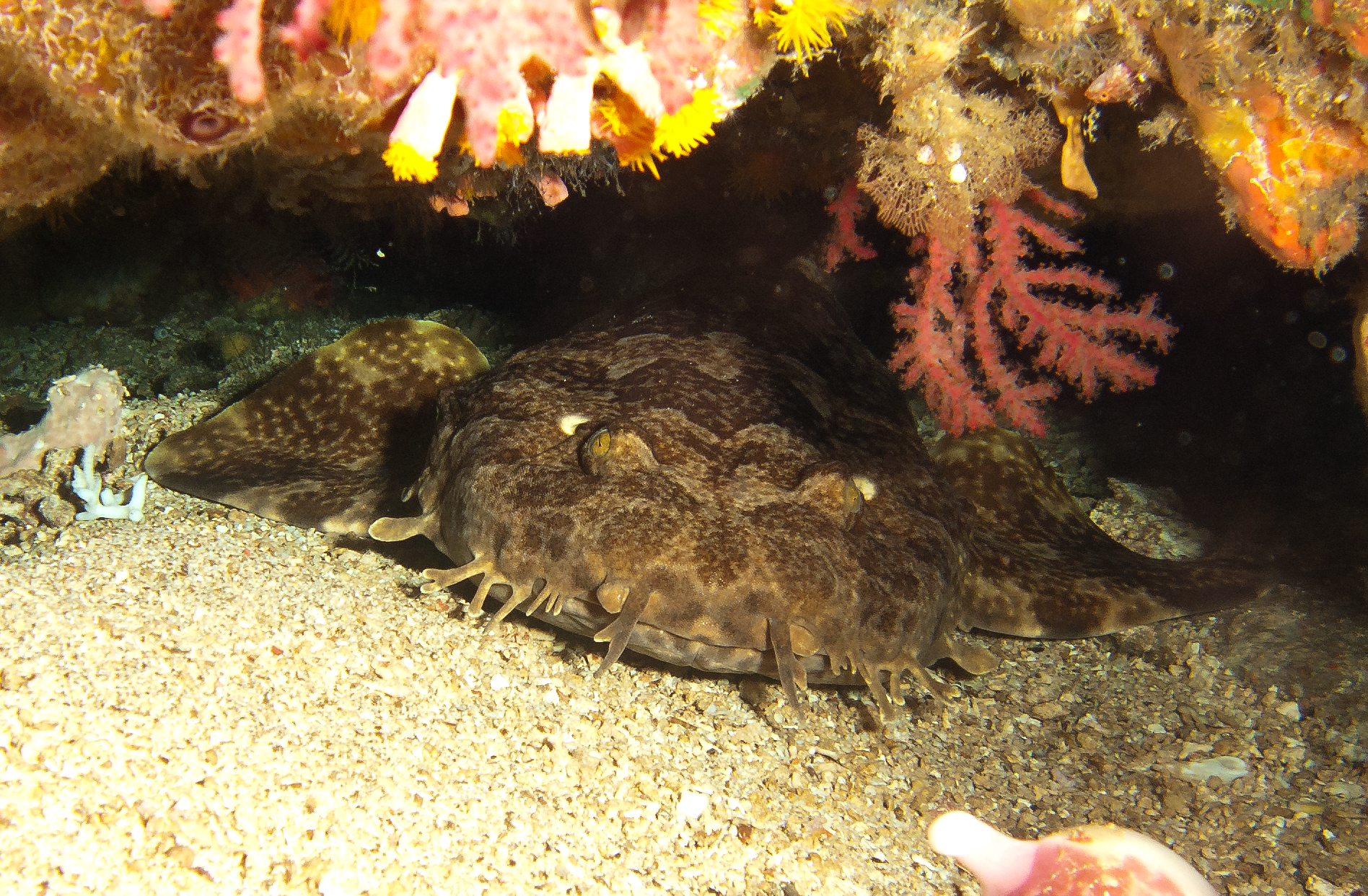
- An Indonesian wobbegong off East Nusa Tenggara

Conservation status
- Near Threatened (IUCN 3.1)

Scientific classification
- Kingdom: Animalia
- Phylum: Chordata
- Class: Chondrichthyes
- Subclass: Elasmobranchii
- Division: Selachii
- Order: Orectolobiformes
- Family: Orectolobidae
- Genus: Orectolobus
- Species: O. leptolineatus

Binomial name
- Orectolobus leptolineatus Last, Pogonoski & W. T. White, 2010

= Indonesian wobbegong =

Species of shark

The Indonesian wobbegong (Orectolobus leptolineatus) is a species of carpet shark in the family Orectolobidae, that can grow up to 120 cm in length. It lives in the Western Pacific on the ocean floor, and is harmless to humans.

== Naming ==
Its scientific name is O. leptolineatus, with leptolineatus meaning "thin lines", which refers to the camouflaging pattern on its skin.

== Distribution and habitat ==
It lives in benthopelagic environments with a minimum depth range of 20 meters, in tropical areas. It lives near Indonesia, and off Sarawak, having unconfirmed records from the Penghu Islands, Visayas, and Cebu City.

== Description ==
Males grow to a length of 112 cm, while females grow a bit larger at 120 cm. Its coloration is dark brownish bars, over the dorsal and lateral surfaces, and its dorsal and upper surfaced paired fins contain vermicular patterns. The ventral surface of the trunk is pale, with nasal barbels with branches, with up to 3 simple lobes, along with 3 to 4 branched lobes. The dorsal fin grows tall, with the first dorsal fin near the pelvic fins. It has 23 rows of teeth in the upper jaw, and a rudimentary row of teeth that is at the symphysis of the upper jaw. Its total vertebral ranges from 148 to 163.

== Maturity ==
Males are mature when they reach 90 cm in length. The smallest mature female was 94 cm in length, along with two pregnant females recorded, with one 104 cm, and the other at 108 cm in length. The smaller of the two was found with four mid-term embryos between 13 and 14 cm in length.
