= Annea (fish) =

Annea Temporal range: Toarcian – Bajocian

Scientific classification
- Kingdom: Animalia
- Phylum: Chordata
- Class: Chondrichthyes
- Subclass: Elasmobranchii
- Division: Selachii
- Order: Orectolobiformes
- Genus: †Annea; Thies, 1983

Species
- Annea carinata Thies 1983; Annea maubeugei Delsate and Thies 1995

Genus of extinct carpet shark

Annea is an extinct genus of carpet shark from the middle Jurassic epoch of the Jurassic period. It is currently known by two species. A. carinata is known from the upper Aalenian and lower Bajocian of Germany. A. maubeugei is known from the middle Toarcian of Belgium. Its name honors Dr. P. L. Maubeuge, who studied the Jurassic of Lorraine in which this species was found. This genus appears to exhibit heterodonty.
