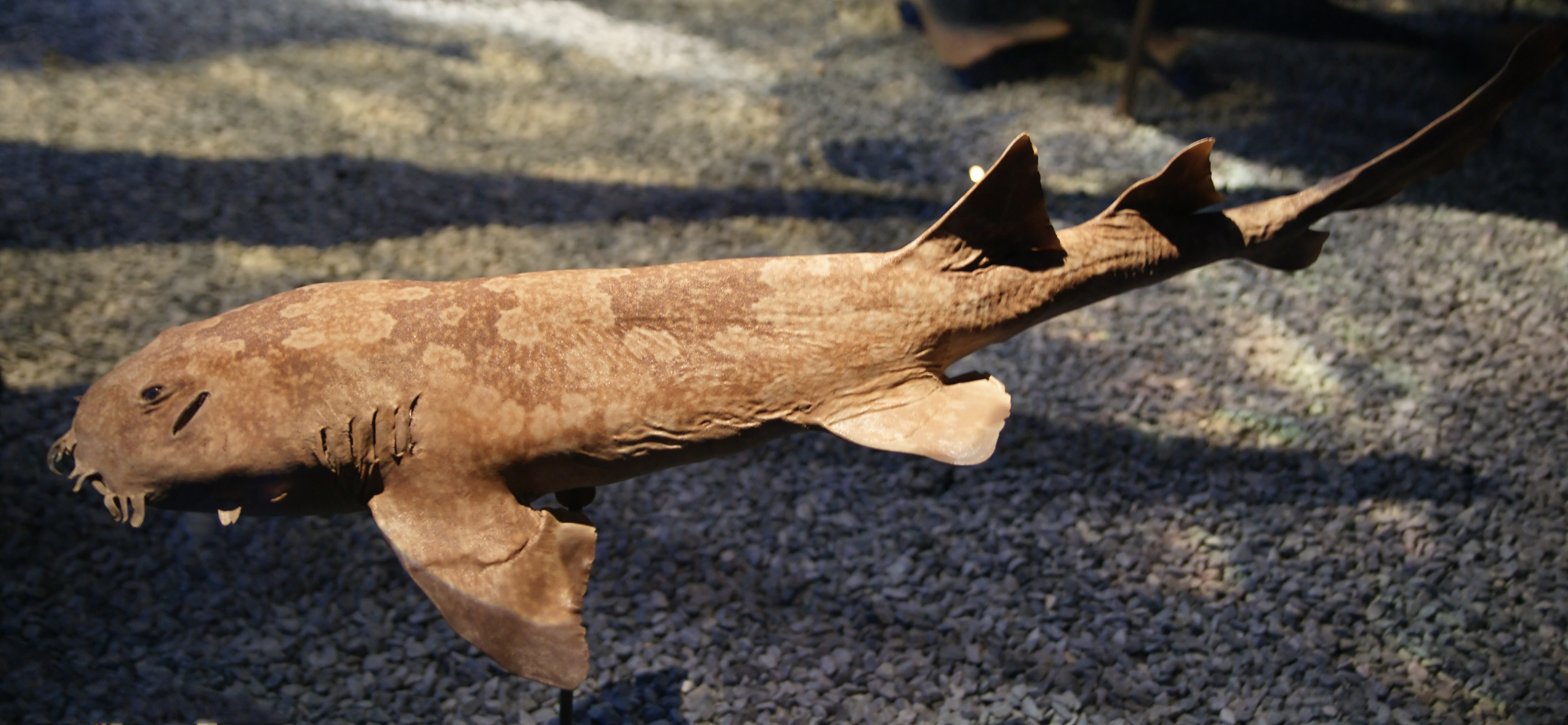
- Orectolobus japonicus in the Naturhistorisches Museum Wien

Conservation status
- Least Concern (IUCN 3.1)

Scientific classification
- Kingdom: Animalia
- Phylum: Chordata
- Class: Chondrichthyes
- Subclass: Elasmobranchii
- Division: Selachii
- Order: Orectolobiformes
- Family: Orectolobidae
- Genus: Orectolobus
- Species: O. japonicus

Binomial name
- Orectolobus japonicus Regan, 1906
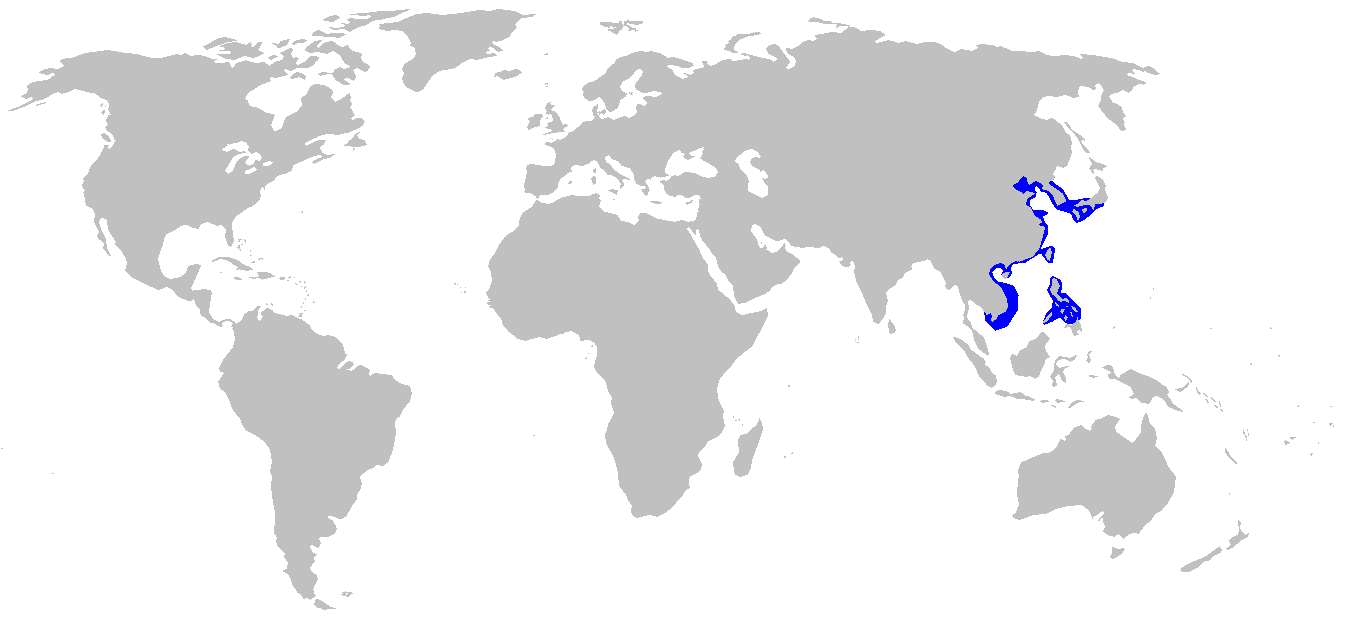
- Range of Japanese wobbegong (in blue)

= Japanese wobbegong =

Species of shark

The Japanese wobbegong (Orectolobus japonicus) is a carpet shark in the family Orectolobidae of the wobbegong family, found in the tropical western Pacific Ocean from Japan and Korea to Vietnam and the Philippines, between latitudes 43 and 6°N. It reaches a length of 1 m. The genome of Orectolobus japonicus is 16,706 base pairs long and follows the usual vertebrate gene arrangement, but its tRNA-Ser2 gene is different because it lacks the dihydrouridine arm and can't form the normal cloverleaf structure. Japanese wobbegong sharks typically remain motionless during the daytime and are not active hunters. They use camouflage and their electroreceptor pores on their dorsal area to help them sense prey nearby.

== See also ==
- List of sharks
