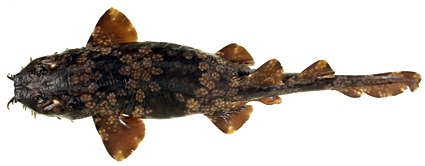
- Orectolobus floridus

Conservation status
- Least Concern (IUCN 3.1)

Scientific classification
- Kingdom: Animalia
- Phylum: Chordata
- Class: Chondrichthyes
- Subclass: Elasmobranchii
- Division: Selachii
- Order: Orectolobiformes
- Family: Orectolobidae
- Genus: Orectolobus
- Species: O. floridus

Binomial name
- Orectolobus floridus Last & Chidlow, 2008
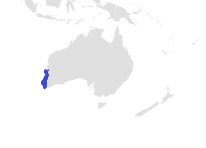
- Range of the Floral banded wobbegong (in blue)

= Floral banded wobbegong =

Species of shark

The floral banded wobbegong (Orectolobus floridus) is a recently described species of carpet shark found in the Indian Ocean, at depths of 42 to 85 meters, off southwestern Australia. With a maximum length of up to 75 cm (30 in), it is among the smallest wobbegongs. The physical characteristics consist of a striking color pattern of yellowish-brown bands, blotches, spots, and reticulations.
