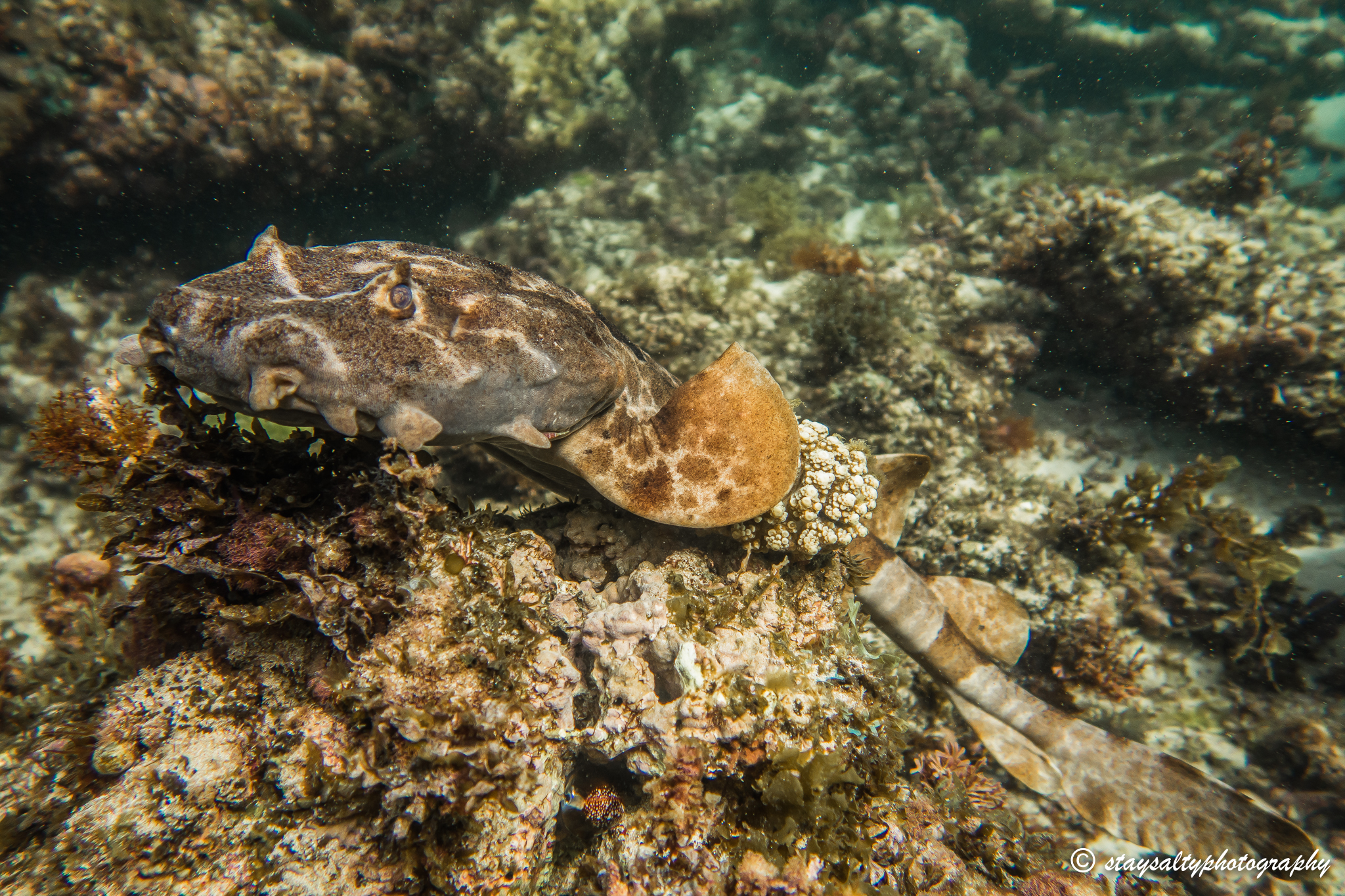

Conservation status
- Least Concern (IUCN 3.1)

Scientific classification
- Kingdom: Animalia
- Phylum: Chordata
- Class: Chondrichthyes
- Subclass: Elasmobranchii
- Division: Selachii
- Order: Orectolobiformes
- Family: Orectolobidae
- Genus: Orectolobus
- Species: O. hutchinsi

Binomial name
- Orectolobus hutchinsi Last, Chidlow & Compagno, 2006
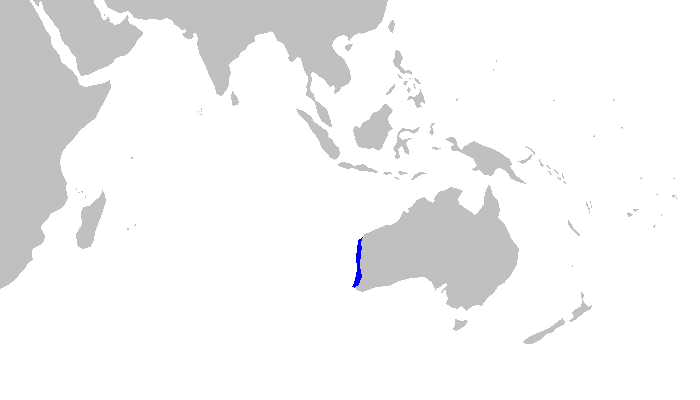
- Range of western wobbegong (in blue)

= Orectolobus hutchinsi =

Species of shark

Orectolobus hutchinsi, the western wobbegong, is a species of carpet shark in the family Orectolobidae. The western wobbegong shark is a moderate sized marine shark found off the coast of Western Australia. Its scientific name is Orectolobus hutchinsi, and it was first identified in 1983 by Dr. Barry Hutchins, but was only recently classified, described, and published in 2006. O. hutchinsi is found on the shallow continental shelf in Western Australia from Coral Bay to Groper Bluff. This species is distinct from other wobbegong sharks because the western wobbegong shark has a yellowish brown upper body and darker brown saddles on their backs. Unlike other wobbegong sharks from the same area, the western wobbegong shark does not have white rings or blotches on their backs.

== Morphology ==
=== Electrosensitivity ===
Like all wobbegong sharks, the western wobbegong shark is able to electrosense, meaning that the shark can sense the electricity of moving organisms around it. The way that electrosensitivity works is through the gel-filled pores on and surrounding the wobbegong shark's head. The gel-filled canals open on the surface of the skin, where they pick up sensory information from the environment. At the bottom of these gel-filled pores are the wobbegong's ampullae of Lorenzini. Wobbegong sharks have "macro-ampullae", meaning that their ampullae have large pores and long gel-filled canals, which is an adaptation to the salt water's high electrical conductivity and allows the wobbegong to accurately process the information. The ampullae of Lorenzini pick up electric information from the water, and send it to the ampullary organ, which is used to process the stimuli. These are located around the head, in order to provide the most useful information to the organism because of its close proximity to the wobbegong's mouth. Additionally, the electrosensing pores are concentrated dorsally, which benefits the wobbegong in low light because it is able to sense prey rather than directly see it. Overall, the wobbegong shark's electrosensitivity ability provides information about the shark's surrounding environment. Additionally, electrosensing may have numerous biological functions: detecting predators and prey, communicating with other organisms, detecting mates, and potentially allowing the shark to accurately navigate short distances.

=== Body description ===
The western wobbegong shark has a firm, dorso-ventrally compressed body, meaning that O. hutchinsi is flattened more on their back and tail and less near their heads. The colour of O. hutchinsi's back is brownish yellow with splotches that are dark brown down the shark's back. The western wobbegong shark has highly patterned skin with dark brown saddles on their backs which helps them blend into their environment and hide from predators. Unlike other wobbegong species, the western wobbegong shark does not have any white spots or blotches on their bodies. Additionally, the western wobbegong does not have any warty tubercles (wart-like growths) on their backs, and has relatively larger dorsal fins. O. hutchinsi has four equally spaced gills on the side of its head which it uses to filter oxygen from the surrounding water in order to breathe. The fins of the western wobbegong are the pectoral fins, a triangular pelvic fin, a lobe-like anal fin, a caudal fin, and triangular dorsal fins. Their eyes are located on their heads, and O. hutchinsi's eyes have a duplex retina. Having a duplex retina means that the western wobbegong shark's eyes contain both rods and cones, for light sensitivity and colour resolution, respectively.

=== Measurements ===
Western wobbegong males and females are around the same size, which may be an adaptation to surviving in their environment where it is essential to be the right size to fit into cracks in rock. O. hutchinsi males mature to be around 111 cm long and 15 kg heavy, which is larger than other wobbegong species. More data needs to be collected for female body size. When they mate, their young are born at 22–26 cm.

== Reproduction ==
O. hutchinsi tends to mate in late July, and females can store sperm for up to 6 months. Although more genetic analysis is needed, it is hypothesized that this may be an evolutionary adaptation to make sure the female has a constant supply of sperm, as well as increasing genetic diversity in that females can store sperm from more than one male.

In wobbegong sharks, ovulation is hypothesized to occur in a biennial or triennial cycle, meaning it happens 2-3 times per year. The gestation period for O. hutchinsi is 9–11 months, and O. hutchinsi females have litters of about 23 pups. Compared to other wobbegong species, O. hutchinsi can carry a larger litter to term because they are not physiologically constrained by uterus structure or size.

== Evolutionary history ==
Wobbegong sharks are a species located under the elasmobranch subclass of Chondrichthyes, meaning the wobbegongs are cartilaginous fish with 4-7 gill slits. Elasmobranch fish have survived four mass-extinctions, and it is speculated that members of the elasmobranch lineage (including western wobbegong sharks) are related to ancestors from the Mesozoic period. The orectolobidae genus of sharks likely diversified from their other ancestors in the Miocene age, which may explain the high distribution of wobbegongs within the Inso-Australian region. It is suspected that there was a rapid spreading of wobbegong sharks within the last 2 million years, despite there being a lack of an extensive fossil record. This rapid spreading and diversification of wobbegongs was likely caused by two distinct events: major tectonic plate movement in the region causing geological changes, and glacial cycles causing changes in oceanography, coastal geology, and geographic barriers. These two potential changes may have occurred simultaneously or sequentially, but both were likely factors in influencing the present day wobbegong distribution. Genetically, studies have been conducted to analyze the western wobbegong's mitochondrial DNA to determine their relation to other wobbegong species, which found that O. hutchinsi was one of the more recent species to diverge and has a sister species to Orectolobus parvimaculatus.

== Habitat ==
O. hutchinsi are mainly benthic organisms, meaning they spend most of their lives on the seafloor. Wobbegongs as a genus are usually found in temperate and tropical continental water in the western Pacific and eastern Indian Ocean, but the western wobbegong is part of the recent diversification in Australian waters. O. hutchinsi is one of the 7 wobbegong species to be recorded in Australian waters, out of the 8 total wobbegong species recognized as valid. O. hutchinsi has been found in waters from 0.1 to 106 m, showing that they prefer to live in the shallow water of the continental shelf. They live in rocky reefs or seagrass habitats, and use their high patterned skin to camouflage to their surroundings and await prey.

== Feeding ==
The wobbegong genus as a whole normally feeds on demersal teleost fish and smaller elasmobranchs, but O. hutchinsi additionally preys on cephalopods, which are squids, nautilus or octopus. The western wobbegong shark uses its electrosensing capabilities to sense and capture prey. Their electrosensitivity is highly accurate behind their heads, which allows the wobbegong to accurately strike and capture prey even when the prey is not visible. Because wobbegong sharks wait for prey on the seafloor, their electrosensing capabilities are essential in detecting prey swimming near them. The western wobbegong shark employs a "sit-and-wait" feeding strategy, meaning that they wait for prey to swim by and then strike quickly and accurately with the help of their electrosensing abilities. Their feeding strategy is unusual for sharks: wobbegongs ambush prey during the daylight, because their well-camouflaged body makes it difficult for prey to detect them when they're motionless on the seafloor.

== Predation ==
A significant threat for the western wobbegong shark is human activity. Wobbegong species are used as a food source not only in Australia, where the western wobbegong shark lives, but also China, Japan, and Malaysia. O. hutchinsi also may be experiencing a population decline, which may be a result of fishing practices in Australia. They are frequently caught for food and are commercially targeted in some parts of Australia, as well as being caught accidentally as a byproduct of gillnet, longline, rock lobster, and recreational fisheries.

== See also ==
- List of sharks
