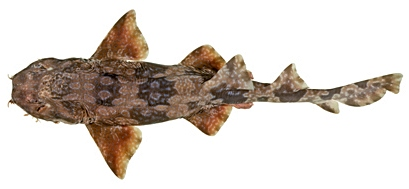
- Orectolobus parvimaculatus

Conservation status
- Least Concern (IUCN 3.1)

Scientific classification
- Kingdom: Animalia
- Phylum: Chordata
- Class: Chondrichthyes
- Subclass: Elasmobranchii
- Division: Selachii
- Order: Orectolobiformes
- Family: Orectolobidae
- Genus: Orectolobus
- Species: O. parvimaculatus

Binomial name
- Orectolobus parvimaculatus Last & Chidlow, 2008
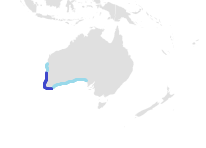
- Range of the dwarf spotted wobbegong (confirmed in dark blue, possible in light blue)

= Dwarf spotted wobbegong =

Species of shark

The dwarf spotted wobbegong (Orectolobus parvimaculatus) is a small-bodied predatory carpet shark in the family Orectolobidae, first discovered and described in 2008. It is native to the Eastern Indian Ocean where it inhabits the demersal zone.

Endemic to the waters off southwestern Australia, the dwarf spotted wobbegong is found at depths of 9–135 metres (30–443 ft) in continental shelf waters extending from Shark Bay to Mandurah in Western Australia.

Longevity of O. parvimaculatus is unknown; maximum size is at least 94 centimetres (3.08 ft) total length (TL) with 50% of females reaching maturity at 88–94.3 centimetres (2.89–3.09 ft) TL and 50% of males at 71–88.5 centimetres (2.33–2.90 ft) TL.

== See also ==
- List of sharks
