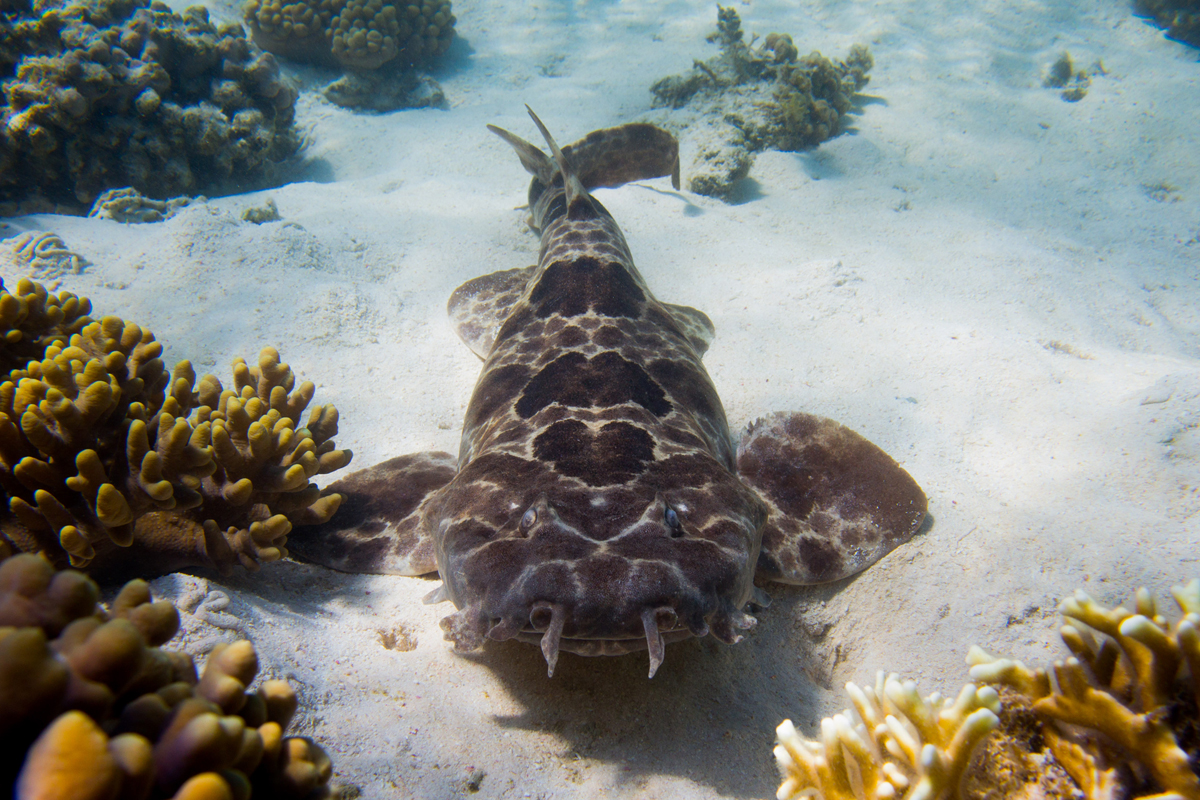
- Specimen at Turquoise Bay

Conservation status
- Least Concern (IUCN 3.1)

Scientific classification
- Kingdom: Animalia
- Phylum: Chordata
- Class: Chondrichthyes
- Subclass: Elasmobranchii
- Division: Selachii
- Order: Orectolobiformes
- Family: Orectolobidae
- Genus: Orectolobus
- Species: O. wardi

Binomial name
- Orectolobus wardi Whitley, 1939
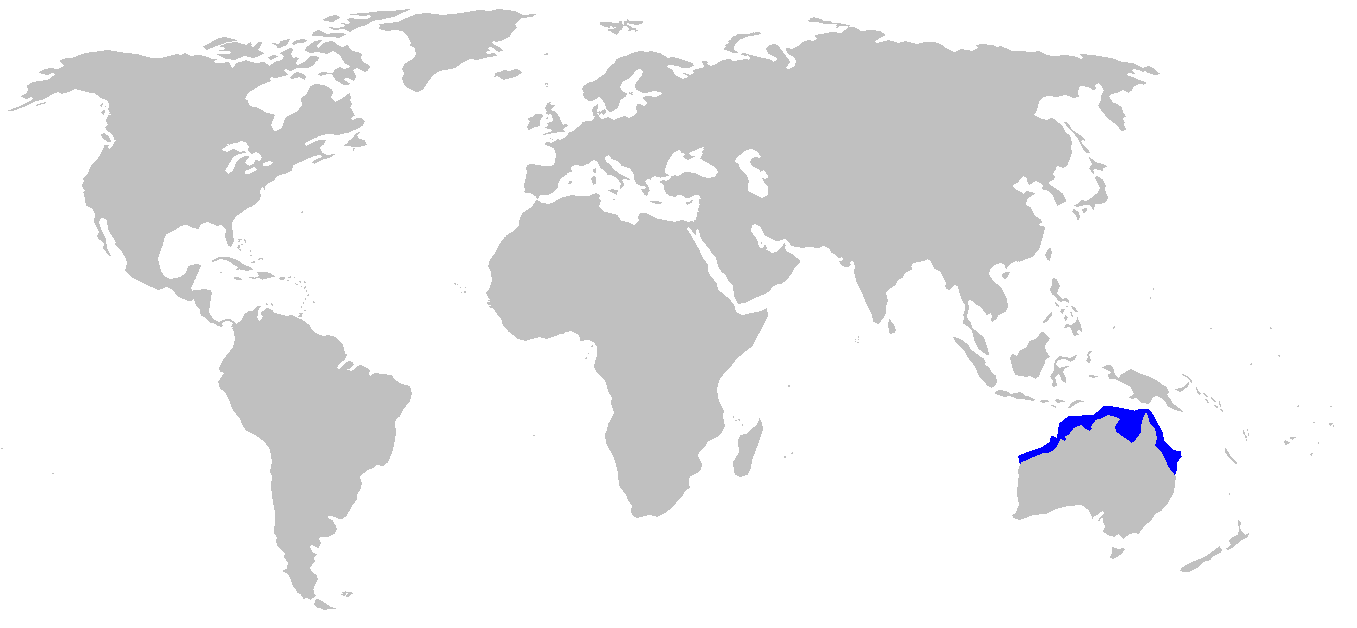
- Range of Northern wobbegong (in blue)

= Northern wobbegong =

Species of shark

The northern wobbegong (Orectolobus wardi) is a carpet shark in the family Orectolobidae, found in the western Pacific Ocean around Australia, between latitudes 9° S to 26° S. It reaches a length of 63 cm.

== Captivity ==
Northern wobbegongs are excellent aquarium sharks due to their small (30 inch) adult size. They can be successfully reared in 135 gallon aquaria, but sharks in general tend to do better in aquaria 180 gallons or more in volume.

== See also ==
- List of sharks
