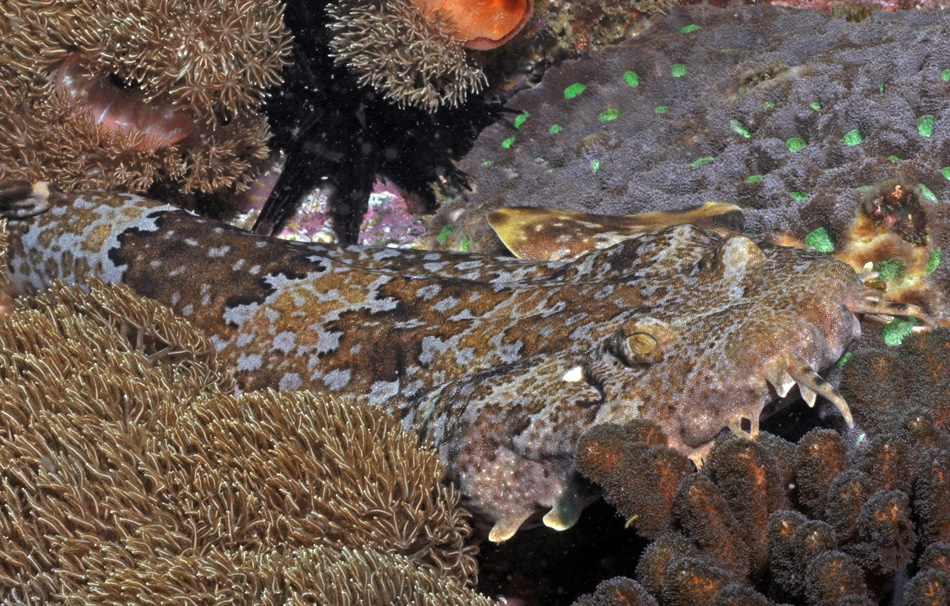

Conservation status
- Least Concern (IUCN 3.1)

Scientific classification
- Kingdom: Animalia
- Phylum: Chordata
- Class: Chondrichthyes
- Subclass: Elasmobranchii
- Division: Selachii
- Order: Orectolobiformes
- Family: Orectolobidae
- Genus: Orectolobus
- Species: O. halei

Binomial name
- Orectolobus halei Whitley, 1940
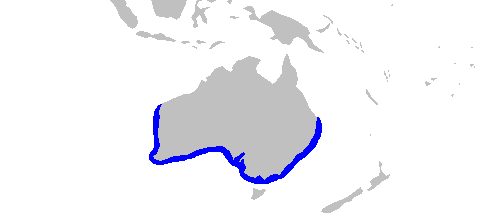
- Range of the gulf wobbegong (also off Flinders Island)

= Gulf wobbegong =

Species of carpet shark

The gulf wobbegong (Orectolobus halei) is a mid-sized species of predatory carpet shark with the varied coloration, striking patterning and distinctive morphology typical to the family Orectolobidae; it is native to the Southern Ocean where it inhabits the benthic zone.

== Range ==
Endemic to Australian waters, the gulf wobbegong is found along interconnected coastal and reef regions spanning across the southern coast of the continent and beyond, ranging from Hervey Bay, Queensland, south to off Flinders Island (Bass Strait), Tasmania, and west to Norwegian Bay, Western Australia.

== Habitat ==
Orectolobus halei inhabits the coastal and inshore zone on the continental shelf from surface level to a depth of 95–100 m (312–328 ft). Bays and around offshore islands macroalgal-covered reefs, coral reef lagoons and reef flats as well as reef faces and reef channels, provide shelter where it settles on the sea floor and among structures such as caves, trenches, under ledges, and on large sponges.

== Biology ==
The adults of most wobbegong species ranges in growth from 117 to 300 cm (3.84 to 9.84 ft) in total length (TL). Adult gulf wobbegongs grow to at least 206 cm (6.76 ft) TL, with sexual maturity occurring at around 16 years of age when females are 160–187 cm (5.25–6.14 ft) TL and males, 168–181 cm (5.51–5.94 ft) TL. A 206 cm (6.76 ft) TL female has an estimated weight of about 62 kg (137 lb) based on the female length–weight relationship reported by Huveneers, et al. (2007) As a lecithotrophic (ovoviviparous) species, O. halei birth from 17–47 pups following a 10–11 month gestation. The neonatal sharklets are approximately 30 cm (12 in) TL; the weight of eight fully developed pups at 27 cm (11 in) TL, examined shortly before birth in a 2011 study, was found to be about 141 g (5.0 oz) each.

== Ecology ==
As with other wobbegong sharks, O. halei is a nocturnal ambush predator with exceptional camouflage; they can be found resting during daylight hours and A quantitative diet study identified 151 prey items of larger O. halei specimens which had been caught in commercial fishing nets; among the prey species was yellowtail scad, blue mackerel, eastern blue groper, mulloway, Port Jackson shark, and Orectolobus ornatus, the ornate wobbegong.

Strong evidence for social association within the genus has been observed. A 1991 dive survey provided early evidence of site attachment, with individual wobbegongs observed in exactly the same positions on consecutive dives. At Fish Rock, New South Wales, subsequent acoustic-telemetry research documented site fidelity in O. halei, with three of seven tagged sharks regularly detected at Fish Rock and the longest-resident individual detected nearly two years after tagging. Further south at Cabbage Tree Bay Aquatic Reserve near Sydney, a 2016 study of spotted wobbegongs (O. maculatus) found non-random, temporally persistent associations between particular conspecifics; range overlap did not strongly explain the associations, providing evidence of social preferences rather than aggregation being solely a consequence of shared habitat.

Due to pattern and coloration similarities, the identities of Orectolobus halei and Orectolobus ornatus were conflated for decades: O. halei was described as a subspecies of O. ornatus in 1940 and subsequently synonymized with it, before being elevated to species status in 2006. Comparative genetic analysis, however, indicates that O. halei is more closely related to the largely sympatric spotted wobbegong, Orectolobus maculatus, than either are to the generally more northern O. ornatus. This relationship makes behavioral findings documented in O. maculatus potentially relevant to understanding social behavior in O. halei.

Wobbegongs are shown to exhibit a notable response to intrusion into their domain. Although generally described as unaggressive when undisturbed, historical and modern accounts document wobbegongs leaving the bottom to advance toward an intruder in the water column, including instances wherein the shark swims up from the seafloor or shelf, approaching a diver or surfer in a possibly agonistic response. Such records span historical taxonomic treatments in which species identities were not always equivalent to those used today, so they are best treated as genus-level behavioral data rather than as reliable evidence for any particular modern species.

Taken together, these observations suggest that wobbegong populations are more behaviorally structured than a simple aggregation of individuals sharing suitable habitat. Individuals have been documented to show persistent attachment to particular locations, maintain non-random associations with conspecifics and respond selectively to intrusion into a range of space approaching their occupied site. This combination of spatial and social relationships may be viewed as a population matrix rather than merely a coincidental assemblage of animals.

== Etymology ==
The common name "wobbegong" is derived from an Australian term native to the New South Wales region and has been recorded in English since 1852.The gulf wobbegong, Orectolobus halei, is named in honor of Australian naturalist Herbert Mathew Hale (1895–1963), researcher, field zoologist and natural-history collector of considerable standing, who became director of the institution that held and studied Australian zoological material, the South Australian Museum, from 1931 to 1960.

== Conservation status ==
As of October 31, 2021, O. halei has been categorized as Fully Recovered by the IUCN.
