= 2013 in paleoichthyology =

This list of fossil fishes described in 2013 is a list of new taxa of placoderms, fossil cartilaginous fishes and bony fishess of every kind that have been described during the year 2013. The list only includes taxa at the level of genus or species.

== Newly named jawless vertebrates ==
Name	Novelty	Status	Authors	Age	Unit	Location	Notes	Images
Amaltheolepis austfjordia	Sp. nov	Valid	Žigaitė et al.	Devonian		Norway	A talivaliid thelodont, a species of Amaltheolepis.	
Amaltheolepis montiwatsonia	Sp. nov	Valid	Žigaitė et al.	Devonian		Norway	A talivaliid thelodont, a species of Amaltheolepis.	
Amaltheolepis winsnesi	Sp. nov	Valid	Žigaitė et al.	Devonian		Norway	A talivaliid thelodont, a species of Amaltheolepis.	
Capitaspis	Gen. et sp. nov	Valid	Elliott	Late Silurian (Pridolian)	Somerset Island Formation	Canada	A cyathaspidid heterostracan. The type species is Capitaspis giblingi.	
Machairaspis serrata	Sp. nov	Valid	Scott & Wilson	Early Devonian (Lochkovian)	Delorme Formation	Canada	A member of Osteostraci, a species of Machairaspis.	
Nucleaspis	Gen. et sp. nov	Valid	Afanassieva & Karatajūtė-Talimaa	Early Devonian	Severnaya Zemlya Formation	Russia	A member of Osteostraci. The type species is Nucleaspis unica.	
Paraungulaspis	Nom. nov	Valid	Afanassieva & Karatajūtė-Talimaa	Early Devonian		Russia	A member of Osteostraci; a replacement name for Ungulaspis Afanassieva & Karatajūtė-Talimaa, 1998 (preoccupied).	
Reticulaspis	Gen. et sp. nov	Valid	Afanassieva & Karatajūtė-Talimaa	Early Devonian	Severnaya Zemlya Formation	Russia	A member of Osteostraci. The type species is Reticulaspis menneri.	
Ritchieichthys	Gen. et sp. nov	Valid	Sansom et al.	Late Ordovician (Katian)	Nibil Formation	Australia	A member of Arandaspida. The type species is Ritchieichthys nibili.	
Talivalia svalbardia	Sp. nov	Valid	Žigaitė et al.	Devonian		Norway	A talivaliid thelodont, a species of Talivalia.	
Woodfjordia	Gen. et sp. nov	Valid	Žigaitė et al.	Devonian		Norway	A turiniid thelodont. The type species is Woodfjordia collisa.	

== Newly named acanthodians ==
Name	Novelty	Status	Authors	Age	Unit	Location	Notes	Images
Machaeraporus	Gen. et comb. nov	Valid	Burrow et al.	Late Silurian	Stonehouse Formation	Canada	A new genus for "Cheiracanthoides" stonehousensis Legault (1968).	

== Newly named placoderms ==
Name	Novelty	Status	Authors	Age	Unit	Location	Notes	Images
Entelognathus	Gen. et sp. nov	Valid	Zhu et al.	Silurian (late Ludlow)	Kuanti Formation	China	The type species is Entelognathus primordialis.	
Eukaia	Gen. et sp. nov	Valid	Mark-Kurik	Devonian (?Pragin)	Turukhansk region, Northwest Siberian Platform	Russia	A fossil skull representing an Actinolepidoid incertae sedis. The type species is Eukaia elongata.	
Phyllolepis thomsoni	Sp. nov	Valid	Long & Daeschler	Devonian (late Famennian)	Catskill Formation	United States	This is the third species of Phyllolepis known from complete or almost complete specimens (the other two being P. orvini and P. woodwardi, and is the second member of the genus known from North America (the other being the sympatric P. rossmontia.	

== Cartilaginous fishes ==
=== Research ===
- Reassessment of the anatomy of Helicoprion and a study on the phylogenetic relationships of this taxon is published by Tapanila et al. (2013).
- Fossils of cladodontomorph chondrichthyans (a falcatid, a ctenacanthiform and cladodontomorphs of uncertain phylogenetic placement) are described from the Early Cretaceous (Valanginian) of France by Guinot et al. (2013); this is the most recent known record of cladodontomorphs, increasing the fossil record of this group by circa 120 million years.

=== New taxa ===
Name	Novelty	Status	Authors	Age	Unit	Location	Notes	Images
Adnetoscyllium	Gen. et sp. nov	Valid	Guinot et al.	Late Cretaceous (Santonian to early Campanian)		France; United Kingdom	A hemiscylliid shark. The type species is Adnetoscyllium angloparisensis.	
Anomotodon genaulti	Sp nov	Valid	Guinot et al.	Late Cretaceous (late Campanian)		France	A mitsukurinid shark, a species of Anomotodon.	
Bobbodus xerxesi	Sp nov	Valid	Hampe et al.	Late Permian		Iran	A eugeneodontid eugeneodontiform, a species of Bobbodus.	
Bransonella tribula	Sp nov	Valid	Elliott & Hodnett	Permian (early Guadalupian)	Kaibab Limestone	United States	A bransonelliform xenacanthimorph, a species of Bransonella.	
Britobatos	Gen. et comb. nov	Valid	Claeson, Underwood & Ward	Late Cretaceous (Santonian)	Sahel Alma	Lebanon	A relative of platyrhinids; a new genus for "Raja" primarmata Woodward (1889).	
Burnhamia crimensis	Sp nov	Valid	Udovichenko	Eocene (Lutetian-Priabonian)		Kazakhstan; Russia; Ukraine	A member of Mobulidae, a species of Burnhamia .	
Burnhamia nessovi	Sp nov	Valid	Udovichenko	Eocene (Ypresian)		Kazakhstan	A member of Mobulidae, a species of Burnhamia .	
Callorhinchus torresi	Sp nov	Valid	Otero et al.	Latest Cretaceous (late Maastrichtian)	López de Bertodano Formation	Antarctica	A chimaeriform, a species of Callorhinchus.	
Cantioscyllium markaguntensis	Sp. nov	Valid	Kirkland, Eaton & Brinkman	Late Cretaceous (Coniacian to Santonian)	Straight Cliffs Formation	United States	A ginglymostomatid carpet shark, a species of Cantioscyllium.	
Cederstroemia siverssoni	Sp nov	Valid	Guinot et al.	Late Cretaceous (middle Turonian)		France	A carpet shark of uncertain phylogenetic placement, a species of Cederstroemia.	
Chiloscyllium frequens	Sp nov	Valid	Guinot et al.	Late Cretaceous (Santonian to Campanian)		France; United Kingdom	A hemiscylliid shark, a species of Chiloscyllium.	
Chiloscyllium vulloi	Sp nov	Valid	Guinot et al.	Late Cretaceous (middle Turonian)		France	A hemiscylliid shark, a species of Chiloscyllium.	
Columbusia deblieuxi	Sp. nov	Valid	Kirkland, Eaton & Brinkman	Late Cretaceous (Campanian)	Kaiparowits Formation; Wahweap Formation	United States	A sclerorhynchid, a member of Batoidea related to sawfishes; a species of Columbusia.	
Cristomylus	Gen. et 3 sp. nov	Valid	Kirkland, Eaton & Brinkman	Late Cretaceous (Cenomanian to Campanian)	Cedar Mountain Formation; Dakota Formation; Straight Cliffs Formation; Wahweap Formation	United States	A member of Rajiformes related to guitarfishes. The type species is Cristomylus nelsoni; genus also contains C. bulldogensis and C. cifellii.	
Diablodontus	Gen. et sp. nov	Valid	Hodnett, Elliott & Olson	Permian (Roadian)	Kaibab Limestone	United States	A hybodontoid hybodontiform. The type species is Diablodontus michaeledmundi.	
Echinorhinus wadanohanaensis	Sp. nov	Valid	Kitamura	Late Cretaceous (Santonian)	Hinoshima Formation	Japan	A species of Echinorhinus.	
Eoptolamna supracretacea	Sp nov	Valid	Guinot et al.	Late Cretaceous (Santonian to early Campanian)		France; United Kingdom	An eoptolamnid lamniform shark, a species of Eoptolamna.	
Eosqualiolus skrovinai	Sp nov	Valid	Underwood & Schlögl	Miocene	Lakšárska Nová Ves Formation	Slovakia	A dalatiid, a species of Eosqualiolus.	
Gissarodus	Gen. et sp. nov	Valid	Ivanov	Carboniferous (early Bashkirian)	Khodzhir-Bulak Formation	Uzbekistan	A member of Euselachii of uncertain phylogenetic placement. The type species is Gissarodus flabellatus.	
Glikmanius culmenis	Sp nov	Valid	Koot et al.	Permian (Wordian)	Khuff Formation	Oman	A ctenacanthiform, a species of Glikmanius.	
Heterodontus boussioni	Sp nov	Valid	Guinot et al.	Late Cretaceous (early Campanian)		France; United Kingdom	A bullhead shark. Originally described as a species of Heterodontus; subsequently transferred to the separate genus Protoheterodontus by Hovestadt (2018).	
Heterodontus laevis	Sp nov	Valid	Guinot et al.	Late Cretaceous (Cenomanian to Turonian)		France; United Kingdom	A bullhead shark.	
Hybodus bugarensis	Sp nov	Valid	Pla, Márquez-Aliaga & Botella	Middle Triassic (Ladinian)		Spain	A species of Hybodus.	
Hypolophodon patagoniensis	Sp nov	Valid	Cione, Tejedor & Goin	Paleocene	Lefipán Formation	Argentina	A batomorph, a species of Hypolophodon.	
Iago carlaluisai	Sp nov	Valid	Leder	Eocene		Crimean Peninsula	A houndshark, a species of Iago.	
Jaekelotodus bagualensis	Sp. nov	Valid	Otero et al.	Middle to late Eocene	Río Baguales Formation	Chile	A sand shark, a species of Jaekelotodus.	
Keasius	Gen. et sp. et comb. nov	Valid	Welton	Late Eocene to middle Miocene		France; Germany; United States	A relative of the basking shark. The type species is Keasius taylori; genus also contains "Cetorhinus" parvus Leriche (1910).	
Khuffia	Gen. et 2 sp. nov	Valid	Koot et al.	Permian (Wordian)	Khuff Formation	Oman	A sphenacanthid. Genus contains two species: Khuffia lenis and Khuffia prolixa.	
Nanocetorhinus	Gen. et sp. nov	Valid	Underwood & Schlögl	Miocene	Lakšárska Nová Ves Formation	Austria; Germany; Slovakia; Switzerland	A neoselachian of uncertain affinities. The type species is Nanocetorhinus tuberculatus.	
Omanoselache	Gen. et 2 sp. nov	Valid	Koot et al.	Permian (Wordian)	Khuff Formation	Oman	A hybodontiform. Genus contains two species: Omanoselache hendersoni and Omanoselache angiolinii.	
Palaeotriakis	Gen. et comb. nov	Valid	Guinot et al.	Late Cretaceous (Santonian to Campanian)		Lebanon; United Kingdom	A houndshark, a new genus for Paratriakis subserratus Underwood & Ward (2008) and "Thyellina" curtirostris Davis (1887). Later studies still support classification of species subserratus to genus Paratriakis.	
Paraetmopterus horvathi	Sp nov	Valid	Underwood & Schlögl	Miocene	Lakšárska Nová Ves Formation	Austria; Germany; Japan; Slovakia; Spain	Originally described as a lantern shark and a species of Paraetmopterus; subsequently reinterpreted as a sleeper shark and transferred to the separate genus Palaeocentroscymnus.	
Pararhincodon ornatus	Sp nov	Valid	Guinot et al.	Late Cretaceous (Santonian to early Campanian)		France; United Kingdom	A parascylliid shark, a species of Pararhincodon.	
Paratriakis robustus	Sp nov	Valid	Guinot et al.	Late Cretaceous (Santonian to Campanian)		France; United Kingdom	A shark, possibly a houndshark; a species of Paratriakis.	
Parvodus celsucuspus	Sp nov	Valid	Rees et al.	Early Cretaceous (Berriasian)		France	A lonchidiid hybodont, a species of Parvodus.	
Planohybodus marki	Sp nov	Valid	Pinheiro et al.	Early Cretaceous	Malhada Vermelha Formation; Missão Velha Formation	Brazil	A hybodontid shark, a species of Planohybodus.	
Platyrhizodon	Gen. et 2 sp. nov	Valid	Guinot et al.	Late Cretaceous (Santonian to early Campanian)		France; United Kingdom	A carcharhiniform shark of uncertain phylogenetic placement. The type species is Platyrhizodon gracilis; genus also contains additional new species Platyrhizodon barbei.	
Potobatis	Gen. et sp. nov	Valid	Cappetta & Gayet	Paleocene (Danian)	El Molino Formation	Bolivia	A dasyatoid myliobatiform. The type species is Potobatis semperei.	
Pristiophorus striatus	Species	Valid	Underwood & Schlögl	Miocene	Lakšárska Nová Ves Formation	Germany; Slovakia	A sawshark, a species of Pristiophorus	
Prolatodon	Gen. et comb. nov	Valid	Pla, Márquez-Aliaga & Botella	Middle to Late Triassic		Canada; China; Spain; United States	A non-neoselachian shark related to Homalodontus; a new genus for "Polyacrodus" bucheri Cuny, Rieppel & Sander (2001) and "Polyacrodus" contrarius Johns, Barnes & Orchard (1997). Koot et al. (2015) and Manzanares et al. (2018) considered Prolatodon to be a junior synonym of the genus Omanoselache.	
Protosqualus barringtonensis	Sp nov	Valid	Guinot et al.	Late Cretaceous (Cenomanian)		United Kingdom	A squalid shark, a species of Protosqualus.	
Pseudocorax duchaussoisi	Sp nov	Valid	Guinot et al.	Late Cretaceous (middle Turonian)		France	An anacoracid shark, a species of Pseudocorax.	
Pseudomyledaphus	Gen. et sp. nov	Valid	Kirkland, Eaton & Brinkman	Late Cretaceous	Milk River Formation; Straight Cliffs Formation	Canada; United States	A member of Rajiformes related to guitarfishes. The type species is Pseudomyledaphus madseni.	
Reesodus	Gen. et sp. et comb. nov	Valid	Koot et al.	Carboniferous (Tournaisian) to Permian (Wordian)		Oman; Russia; United Kingdom	A hybodontiform. The type species is Reesodus underwoodi; genus also contains "Lissodus" wirksworthensis Duffin (1985) and "Lissodus" pectinatus Lebedev (1996).	
Scyliorhinotheca	Gen. et sp. nov	Valid	Kiel, Peckmann & Simon	Late Eocene		USA	Catshark egg capsules. The type species is Scyliorhinotheca goederti.	
Scyliorhinus monsaugustus	Sp nov	Valid	Guinot et al.	Late Cretaceous (late Campanian)		France	A catshark, a species of Scyliorhinus.	
Scyliorhinus muelleri	Sp nov	Valid	Guinot et al.	Late Cretaceous (middle Turonian)		France	A catshark, a species of Scyliorhinus.	
Sigmoscyllium	Gen. et comb. et sp. nov	Valid	Guinot et al.	Late Cretaceous (Turonian to early Campanian)		France; United Kingdom	A catshark. A new genus for "Palaeoscyllium" striatum Underwood & Ward (2008); genus also contains a new species Sigmoscyllium acuspidatum.	
Squalicorax bernardezi	Sp nov	Valid	Guinot et al.	Late Cretaceous (middle Turonian)		France	An anacoracid shark, a species of Squalicorax.	
Teresodus	Gen. et sp. nov	Valid	Koot et al.	Permian (Wordian)	Khuff Formation	Oman	A hybodontiform. The type species is Teresodus amplexus.	
Texatrygon brycensis	Sp. nov	Valid	Kirkland, Eaton & Brinkman	Late Cretaceous (Campanian)	Wahweap Formation	United States	A member of Ptychotrygonidae, possibly a member of Batoidea related to sawfishes; a species of Texatrygon.	
Tingitanius	Gen. et sp. nov	Valid	Claeson, Underwood & Ward	Late Cretaceous (Turonian)		Morocco	A platyrhinid. The type species is Tingitanius tenuimandibulus.	
Tomewingia	Nom. nov	Valid	Case & Cappetta	Late Cretaceous (Maastrichtian)		United States	A member of Rajiformes of uncertain phylogenetic placement; a replacement name for Ewingia Case & Cappetta (1997) (preoccupied).	
Triakis muelleri	Sp. nov	Valid	Leder	Eocene		Crimean Peninsula	A houndshark, a species of Triakis.	
Vectiselachos gosslingi	Sp nov	Valid	Batchelor	Early Cretaceous (Aptian, possibly also early Albian)	Hythe Formation	United Kingdom	A hybodont shark, a species of Vectiselachos.	

== Bony fishes ==
=== Research ===
- A specimen of the aspidorhynchid Belonostomus tenuirostris with preserved fossilized content of its digestive tract is described by Kogan & Licht (2013).

=== New taxa ===
Name	Novelty	Status	Authors	Age	Unit	Location	Notes	Images
Amia godai	Sp. nov	Valid	Yabumoto & Grande	Early Miocene	Nakamura Formation	Japan	A relative of a bowfin.	
"Anguilloideus" angulosus	Sp. nov	Valid	Nolf & Rundle in Nolf	Paleocene			Possibly a species of Anguilla.	
Annaichthys	Gen. et sp. nov	Valid	Arratia	Late Triassic (Norian)		Italy	A relative of Pholidophorus. The type species is Annaichthys pontegiurinensis.	
Apricenapiscis	Gen. et sp. nov	Valid	Taverne	Late Cretaceous (Santonian)		Italy	A member of Crossognathiformes related to Pachyrhizodus. The type species is Apricenapiscis depotteri.	
Ariomma thanetiensis	Sp. nov	Valid	Nolf & Rundle in Nolf	Paleocene			A species of Ariomma.	
Axelrodichthys maiseyi	Sp. nov	Valid	Carvalho, Gallo & Santos	Early Cretaceous (Albian)	Codó Formation	Brazil	A mawsoniid, a species of Axelrodichthys.	
Bagre protocaribbeanus	Sp. nov	Valid	Aguilera et al.	Early Miocene		Colombia; Venezuela	An ariid catfish, a species of Bagre.	
Bathygadus mandorovensis	Sp. nov	Valid	Schwarzhans	Miocene (Burdigalian to early Tortonian)	Mandorové Formation	Gabon	A grenadier, a species of Bathygadus.	
Belemnocerca	Gen. et sp. nov	Valid	Wendruff & Wilson	Early Triassic	Sulphur Mountain Formation	Canada	A laugiid, a relative of coelacanths. The type species is Belemnocerca prolata.	
Belone countermani	Sp. nov	Valid	de Sant'Anna, Collette & Godfrey	Miocene (Tortonian)	St. Marys Formation	United States	A needlefish, a species of Belone.	
Benthosema pluridens	Sp. nov	Valid	Schwarzhans & Aguilera	Miocene (late Tortonian)	Chagres Formation	Panama	A lanternfish, a species of Benthosema.	
Boreiohydrias	Gen. et sp. nov	Valid	Murray & Cumbaa	Late Cretaceous (Turonian)		Canada	An acanthomorph, a relative of beardfishes. The type species is Boreiohydrias dayi.	
Bregmaceros deklaszi	Sp. nov	Valid	Schwarzhans	Miocene (Burdigalian to early Tortonian)	Mandorové Formation	Angola; Gabon; Portugal	A codlet.	
Bregmaceros hybridus	Sp. nov	Valid	Schwarzhans	Miocene (Serravallian to early Tortonian)	Mandorové Formation	Gabon	A codlet.	
Caffrogobius tutus	Sp. nov	Valid	Schwarzhans	Miocene (Serravallian to early Tortonian)	Mandorové Formation	Gabon	A goby, a species of Caffrogobius.	
Cantarius	Gen. et sp. nov	Valid	Aguilera et al.	Early Miocene		Colombia; Venezuela	An ariid catfish. The type species is Cantarius nolfi.	
Carnevalella	Gen. et comb. et sp. nov	Valid	Bannikov	Late Miocene to early Pliocene		Abkhazia; Russia	A member of Sciaenidae. A new genus for "Sciaena" impropria Gabelaia (1976); genus might also contain a new species C. (?) tmutarakanica.	
Cathorops goeldii	Sp. nov	Valid	Aguilera et al.	Early Miocene	Pirabas Formation	Brazil	An ariid catfish, a species of Cathorops.	
Catostomus (Pantosteus) asitus	Sp. nov	Valid	Smith, Stewart & Carpenter	Pliocene	White Narrows Formation	United States (Nevada)	A species of Catostomus.	
Catostomus (Pantosteus) hyomyzon	Sp. nov	Valid	Smith, Stewart & Carpenter	Miocene	Drewsey Formation; Ellensburg Formation; Juntura Formation	United States (Oregon; Washington)	A species of Catostomus.	
Catostomus (Pantosteus) oromyzon	Sp. nov	Valid	Smith, Stewart & Carpenter	Pliocene		United States (Idaho)	A species of Catostomus.	
Cepola fritinnans	Sp. nov	Valid	Schwarzhans	Miocene (Serravallian to early Tortonian)	Mandorové Formation	Gabon	A bandfish, a species of Cepola.	
Ceratoscopelus priscus	Sp. nov	Valid	Schwarzhans & Aguilera	Miocene (late Burdigalian to early Langhian)	Cantaure Formation	Venezuela	A lanternfish, a species of Ceratoscopelus.	
Chaohuperleidus	Gen. et sp. nov	Valid	Sun et al.	Early Triassic (Olenekian)	Nanlinghu Formation	China	A relative of a Perleidus. The type species is Chaohuperleidus primus.	
Chatrabus weileri	Sp. nov	Valid	Schwarzhans	Miocene (Burdigalian to early Tortonian)	Mandorové Formation	Gabon	A member of Batrachoididae, a species of Chatrabus.	
Cipactlichthys	Gen. et sp. nov	Valid	Brito & Alvarado-Ortega	Early Cretaceous (Albian)	Tlayua Formation	Mexico	A member of Holostei and Halecomorphi (a relative of the bowfin). The type species is Cipactlichthys scutatus.	
Condorlepis	Gen. et comb. nov	Valid	López-Arbarello, Sferco & Rauhut	Late Jurassic	Cañadón Calcáreo Formation	Argentina	A coccolepidid, a member of Chondrostei; a new genus for "Oligopleurus" groeberi Bordas (1943). Genus might also include Early Cretaceous species "Coccolepis" woodwardi Waldman (1971) from Australia.	
Cretargentina	Gen. et sp. nov	Valid	Taverne	Late Cretaceous (Santonian)		Italy	A member of Argentiniformes belonging to the family Pattersonellidae. The type species is Cretargentina chapmani.	
Ctenodus allodens	Sp. nov	Valid	Sharp & Clack	Carboniferous (Viséan)	Dunnet Shale	United Kingdom		
Dalgoichthys	Gen. et sp. nov	Valid	González-Rodríguez, Schultze & Arratia	Cretaceous (Albian or Cenomanian)	El Doctor Formation	Mexico	An acanthomorph of uncertain phylogenetic placement. The type species is Dalgoichthys tropicalis.	
Diaphus aequalis	Sp. nov	Valid	Schwarzhans & Aguilera	Late Miocene to Pliocene (Piacenzian)	Bowden Formation; Cubagua Formation; Escudo de Veraguas Formation; Mao Formation; Shinzato Formation	Dominican Republic; Jamaica; Japan; Panama; Philippines; Venezuela	A lanternfish, a species of Diaphus.	
Diaphus apalus	Sp. nov	Valid	Schwarzhans & Aguilera	Late Miocene to early Pliocene	Chagres Formation; Gatun Formation; Nancy Point Formation	Panama; Venezuela	A lanternfish, a species of Diaphus.	
Diaphus barrigonensis	Sp. nov	Valid	Schwarzhans & Aguilera	Miocene (late Tortonian) to Pliocene (Zanclean)	Chagres Formation; Cubagua Formation	Panama; Venezuela	A lanternfish, a species of Diaphus.	
Diaphus capax	Sp. nov	Valid	Schwarzhans & Aguilera	Pliocene (Zanclean)	Cubagua Formation	Venezuela	A lanternfish, a species of Diaphus.	
Diaphus coatesi	Sp. nov	Valid	Schwarzhans & Aguilera	Pliocene	Escudo de Veraguas Formation	Panama	A lanternfish, a species of Diaphus.	
Diaphus depressifrons	Sp. nov	Valid	Schwarzhans & Aguilera	Late Miocene to middle Pliocene	Bowden Formation; Cayo Agua Formation; Cubagua Formation; Nancy Point Formation; Shark Hole Point Formation	Jamaica; Panama; Venezuela	A lanternfish, a species of Diaphus.	
Diaphus draconis	Sp. nov	Valid	Schwarzhans	Miocene (Serravallian to early Tortonian)	Mandorové Formation	Gabon	A lanternfish, a species of Diaphus.	
Diaphus ecuadorensis	Sp. nov	Valid	Schwarzhans & Aguilera	Miocene (Messinian)	Onzole Formation	Ecuador	A lanternfish, a species of Diaphus.	
Diaphus gatunensis	Sp. nov	Valid	Schwarzhans & Aguilera	Late Miocene	Angostura Formation; Gatun Formation	Ecuador; Panama	A lanternfish, a species of Diaphus.	
Diaphus multiserratus	Sp. nov	Valid	Schwarzhans & Aguilera	Late Miocene	Nancy Point Formation	Panama	A lanternfish, a species of Diaphus.	
Diaphus paxtoni	Sp. nov	Valid	Schwarzhans & Aguilera	Pliocene	Bowden Formation; Escudo de Veraguas Formation; Shark Hole Point Formation	Jamaica; Panama	A lanternfish, a species of Diaphus.	
Diaphus rodriguezi	Sp. nov	Valid	Schwarzhans & Aguilera	Miocene (late Tortonian)	Chagres Formation	Panama	A lanternfish, a species of Diaphus.	
Diogenichthys aguilerai	Sp. nov	Valid	Schwarzhans	Miocene (late Aquitanian to Burdigalian)	Quinfangondo Formation	Angola	A lanternfish, a species of Diogenichthys.	
Diogenichthys hulleyi	Sp. nov	Valid	Schwarzhans	Miocene (early Tortonian)	Mandorové Formation	Gabon	A lanternfish, a species of Diogenichthys.	
Dorsetichthys	Gen. et comb. nov	Valid	Arratia	Early Jurassic		United Kingdom	A new genus for "Pholidophorus" bechei Agassiz (1837).	
Edenopteron	Gen. et sp. nov	Valid	Young et al.	Late Devonian (Famennian)		Australia	A mandageriine tristichopterid tetrapodomorph. The type species is Edenopteron keithcrooki.	
Euclichthys lawsoni	Sp. nov	Valid	Nolf & Rundle in Nolf	Eocene		United Kingdom	A species of Euclichthys.	
Foa obesa	Sp. nov	Valid	Schwarzhans	Miocene (Serravallian to early Tortonian)	Mandorové Formation	Gabon	A cardinalfish, a species of Foa.	
Gaidropsarus pilleri	Sp. nov	Valid	Carnevale & Harzhauser	Middle Miocene		Austria	A species of Gaidropsarus.	
Gasterosteus kamoensis	Sp. nov	Valid	Nazarkin, Yabumoto & Urabe	Late Miocene	Minamiimogawa Formation	Japan	A stickleback, a species of Gasterosteus.	
Ghrisichthys	Gen. et comb. nov	Valid	Cavin, Forey & Giersch	Late Cretaceous (Turonian)		Morocco	An ichthyodectid, a new genus for "Ichthyodectes" bardacki.	
Gladiopycnodus	Gen. et sp. nov	Valid	Taverne & Capasso	Late Cretaceous (late Cenomanian)		Lebanon	A pycnodontiform. The type species is Gladiopycnodus karami.	
Gnathophis genaulti	Sp. nov	Valid	Nolf & Rundle in Nolf	Paleocene			A species of Gnathophis.	
Handuichthys	Gen. et sp. nov	Valid	González-Rodríguez, Schultze & Arratia	Cretaceous (Albian or Cenomanian)	El Doctor Formation	Mexico	A member of Beryciformes. The type species is Handuichthys interopercularis.	
Holoptychius bergmanni	Sp. nov	Valid	Downs et al.	Late Devonian (Frasnian)	Fram Formation	Canada	A holoptychiid sarcopterygian, a species of Holoptychius.	
Knerichthys	Gen. nov	Valid	Arratia	Late Triassic (Carnian)		Italy	A relative of Pholidophorus, a new genus for "Pholidophorus" bronni Kner (1866).	
Kokuraichthys	Gen. et sp. nov	Valid	Yabumoto	Early Cretaceous	Dobaru Formation	Japan	A hiodontiform. The type species is Kokuraichthys tokuriki.	
Lampadena scapha	Sp. nov	Valid	Schwarzhans & Aguilera	Miocene (late Tortonian) to Pliocene (Piacenzian)	Chagres Formation; Escudo de Veraguas Formation; Nakosi Formation; Shinzato Formation	Fiji; Japan; Panama	A lanternfish, a species of Lampadena.	
Lampanyctus reductus	Sp. nov	Valid	Schwarzhans	Miocene (early Tortonian)	Mandorové Formation	Gabon	A lanternfish, a species of Lampanyctus.	
Lepidophanes brassoensis	Sp. nov	Valid	Schwarzhans & Aguilera	Miocene (late Burdigalian to Langhian)	Brasso Formation	Trinidad and Tobago (Trinidad)	A lanternfish, a species of Lepidophanes.	
Lepidophanes inflectus	Sp. nov	Valid	Schwarzhans & Aguilera	Miocene (late Tortonian) Pliocene (Zanclean)	Chagres Formation; Cubagua Formation	Panama; Venezuela	A lanternfish, a species of Lepidophanes.	
Lesueurigobius ewonguensis	Sp. nov	Valid	Schwarzhans	Miocene (Serravallian to early Tortonian)	Mandorové Formation	Gabon	A goby, a species of Lesueurigobius.	
Lobianchia johnfitchi	Sp. nov	Valid	Schwarzhans & Aguilera	Late Miocene to early Pliocene	Nancy Point Formation	Panama	A lanternfish, a species of Lobianchia.	
Lophionotus	Gen. et 2 sp. et comb. nov	Valid	Gibson	Late Triassic to Early Jurassic	Chinle Formation; Moenave Formation	United States	A member of Semionotiformes. The type species is Lophionotus sanjuanensis Gibson (2013); genus also contains Lophionotus chinleana Gibson (2013), as well as "Semionotus" kanabensis Schaeffer and Dunkle (1950).	
Luopingcoelacanthus	Gen. et sp. nov	Valid	Wen et al..	Anisian	Guanling Formation	China	A coelacanth. The type species is Luopingcoelacanthus eurylacrimalis.	
Mahengichthys	Gen. et sp. nov	Valid	Davis, Arratia & Kaiser	Middle Eocene (Lutetian, 46 to 45 Ma)		Tanzania	A member of Kneriidae. The type species is Mahengichthys singidaensis.	
Marathonichthys	Gen. et sp. nov	Valid	Bartholomai	Early Cretaceous (Albian)	Toolebuc Formation	Australia	A member of Albuliformes. The type species is M. coyleorum.	
Mesetaichthys	Gen. et sp. nov	Valid	Bieńkowska-Wasiluk et al.	Early Eocene	La Meseta Formation	Antarctica	A member of Notothenioidei. The type species is Mesetaichthys jerzmanskae.	
Monocerichthys	Gen. et sp. nov	Valid	Taverne & Capasso	Late Cretaceous (late Cenomanian)		Lebanon	A pycnodontiform. The type species is Monocerichthys scheuchzeri.	
Myctophum arcanum	Sp. nov	Valid	Schwarzhans & Aguilera	Miocene (late Tortonian)	Chagres Formation	Panama	A lanternfish, a species of Myctophum.	
Myctophum degraciai	Sp. nov	Valid	Schwarzhans & Aguilera	Miocene (late Tortonian)	Chagres Formation	Panama	A lanternfish, a species of Myctophum.	
Myctophum mundulum	Sp. nov	Valid	Schwarzhans & Aguilera	Miocene (Langhian)	Brasso Formation	Trinidad and Tobago (Trinidad)	A lanternfish, a species of Myctophum.	
Nardodercetis garganoi	Sp. nov	Valid	Taverne	Late Cretaceous (Santonian)		Italy	A member of Aulopiformes belonging to the group Enchodontoidei and the family Dercetidae; a species of Nardodercetis.	
Orthocormus roeperi	Sp. nov	Valid	Arratia & Schultze	Late Jurassic (late Kimmeridgian)		Germany	A member of Pachycormiformes, a species of Orthocormus.	
Pacorichthys	Gen. et sp. nov	Valid	Lombardo	Middle Triassic (Ladinian)	Meride Limestone	Switzerland	A basal member of Actinopterygii. The type species is Pacorichthys sangiorgii.	
Palaeogadus schwarzhansi	Sp. nov	Valid	Bratishko & Udovichenko	Oligocene (Rupelian)	Uzunbas Formation	Kazakhstan	A merlucciid gadiform, a species of Palaeogadus.	
Palimphyes stolyarovi	Sp. nov	Valid	Bratishko & Udovichenko	Oligocene (Rupelian)	Uzunbas Formation	Kazakhstan	A euzaphlegid, a species of Palimphyes.	
Paralampadena	Gen. et 3 sp. et comb. nov	Valid	Schwarzhans	Miocene		Angola; Czech Republic; Gabon; Italy; Romania	A lanternfish. The type species is Paralampadena gabonensis; genus also contain new species Paralampadena angolensis and Paralampadena solida, as well as Paralampadena gracile (Schubert, 1912).	
Paralebias	Gen. et comb. nov	Valid	Gaudant	Oligocene to Miocene		Europe	A procatopodine poeciliid fish; a new genus for four species of poeciliids, including "Lebias" cephalotes Agassiz (1839), "Prolebias" egeranus Laube (1901) and "Prolebias" malzi Reichenbacher & Gaudant (2003).	
Pepemkay	Gen. et sp. nov	Valid	Alvarado-Ortega & Than-Marchese	Late Cretaceous (Cenomanian)	Sierra Madre Formation	Mexico	A lissoberycine slimehead. The type species is Pepemkay maya.	
Perca neopleistocenica	Sp. nov	Valid	Kovalchuk	Pleistocene		Ukraine	A perch.	
Porolepis foxi	Sp. nov	Valid	Johanson, Ahlberg & Ritchie	Devonian (?Pragian–Emsian or Eifelian)	Mulga Downs Group	Australia	A porolepiform sarcopterygian, a species of Porolepis.	
Potanichthys	Gen. et sp. nov	Valid	Xu et al.	Middle Triassic (Ladinian)	Falang Formation	China	A relative of Thoracopterus capable of over-water gliding. The type species is Potanichthys xingyiensis. The species might be synonymous with the species Thoracopterus wushaensis Tintori et al. (2012).	
Pseudomonocentris	Gen. et sp. nov	Valid	González-Rodríguez, Schultze & Arratia	Cretaceous (Albian or Cenomanian)	El Doctor Formation	Mexico	A member of Beryciformes. The type species is Pseudomonocentris microspinosus.	
Pterothrissus caspiensis	Sp. nov	Valid	Bratishko & Udovichenko	Oligocene (Rupelian)	Uzunbas Formation	Kazakhstan	A species of Pterothrissus.	
Rhinopycnodus	Gen. et sp. nov	Valid	Taverne & Capasso	Late Cretaceous (late Cenomanian)		Lebanon	A pycnodontid pycnodontiform. The type species is Rhinopycnodus gabriellae.	
Rostropycnodus	Gen. et sp. nov	Valid	Taverne & Capasso	Late Cretaceous (late Cenomanian)		Lebanon	A pycnodontiform. The type species is Rostropycnodus gayeti.	
Saccogaster batanga	Sp. nov	Valid	Schwarzhans	Miocene (Serravallian to early Tortonian)	Mandorové Formation	Gabon	A viviparous brotula, a species of Saccogaster.	
Sakhalinia	Gen. et sp. nov	Valid	Nazarkin, Carnevale & Bannikov	Miocene	Agnevo Formation	Russia	A member of Hexagrammidae. The type species is Sakhalinia multispinata.	
Salminus noriegai	Sp. nov	Valid	Cione & Azpelicueta	Miocene (early Tortonian)		Argentina	A species of Salminus.	
Sapperichthys	Gen. et sp. nov	Valid	Amaral, Alvarado-Ortega & Brito	Late Cretaceous (Cenomanian)	Sierra Madre Formation	Mexico	A relative of the beaked salmon. The type species is Sapperichthys chiapanensis.	
Saurichthys grignae	Sp. nov	Valid	Tintori	Middle Triassic (Ladinian)	Buchenstein Formation	Italy	A member of Saurichthyiformes, a species of Saurichthys.	
Saurida tenera	Sp. nov	Valid	Schwarzhans	Miocene (Serravallian to early Tortonian)	Mandorové Formation	Gabon	A lizardfish, a species of Saurida.	
Secutor africanus	Sp. nov	Valid	Schwarzhans	Miocene (Serravallian to early Tortonian)	Mandorové Formation	Gabon	A ponyfish, a species of Secutor.	
Slovenitriacanthus	Gen. et sp. nov	Valid	Tyler & Križnar	Late Cretaceous (late Santonian-early Campanian)	Lipica Formation	Slovenia	A cretatriacanthid plectocretacicoid tetraodontiform. The type species is Slovenitriacanthus saksidai.	
Songaichthys	Gen. et sp. nov	Valid	Taverne	Middle Jurassic	Stanleyville Formation	Democratic Republic of the Congo	A member of Teleostei related to Ankylophorus. The type species is Songaichthys luctacki.	
Stewartichthys	Gen. et sp. nov	Valid	Bartholomai	Early Cretaceous (Albian)	Toolebuc Formation	Australia	Possibly a member of Albuliformes. The type species is S. leichhardti.	
Stolephorus favonius	Sp. nov	Valid	Schwarzhans	Miocene (Serravallian to early Tortonian)	Mandorové Formation	Gabon	An anchovy, a species of Stolephorus.	
Sylvienodus	Gen. et comb. nov	Valid	Poyato-Ariza	Late Cretaceous (Cenomanian)		Portugal	A pycnodontiform; a new genus for "Pycnodus" laveirensis.	
Teoichthys brevipina	Sp. nov	Valid	Machado et al.	Early Cretaceous (Albian)	Tlayúa Formation	Mexico	An ophiopsid ionoscopiform halecomorph neopterygian, a species of Teoichthys.	
Thaiichthys	Gen. et comb. nov	Valid	Cavin, Deesri & Suteethorn	Late Jurassic or Early Cretaceous		Thailand	A stem lepisosteiform, a new genus for "Lepidotes" buddhabutrensis Cavin et al. (2003).	
Thorectichthys	Gen. et 2 sp. nov	Valid	Murray & Wilson	Late Cretaceous (possibly late Cenomanian, but more probably early Turonian)	Akrabou Formation	Morocco	A paraclupeid, a member of Clupeomorpha and Ellimmichthyiformes. Genus contains two species: Thorectichthys marocensis and Thorectichthys rhadinus.	
Vinciguerria yombeensis	Sp. nov	Valid	Schwarzhans	Miocene (early Tortonian)	Mandorové Formation	Gabon	A member of Phosichthyidae, a species of Vinciguerria.	
Xenyllion stewarti	Sp. nov	Valid	Newbrey et al.	Late Cretaceous (earliest Cenomanian)	Mowry Formation	United States	A sphenocephalid acanthomorph, a species of Xenyllion.	
Yelangichthys	Gen. et sp. nov	Valid	Wu et al.	Middle Triassic	Guanling Formation	China	A yelangichthyid saurichthyiform. The type species is Yelangichthys macrocephalus.	
Yunnancoelacanthus	Gen. et sp. nov	Valid	Wen et al..	Anisian	Guanling Formation	China	A coelacanth. The type species is Yunnancoelacanthus acrotuberculatus.	
Zambellichthys	Gen. et sp. nov	Valid	Arratia	Late Triassic (Norian)		Italy	A relative of Pholidophorus. The type species is Zambellichthys bergamensis.	
