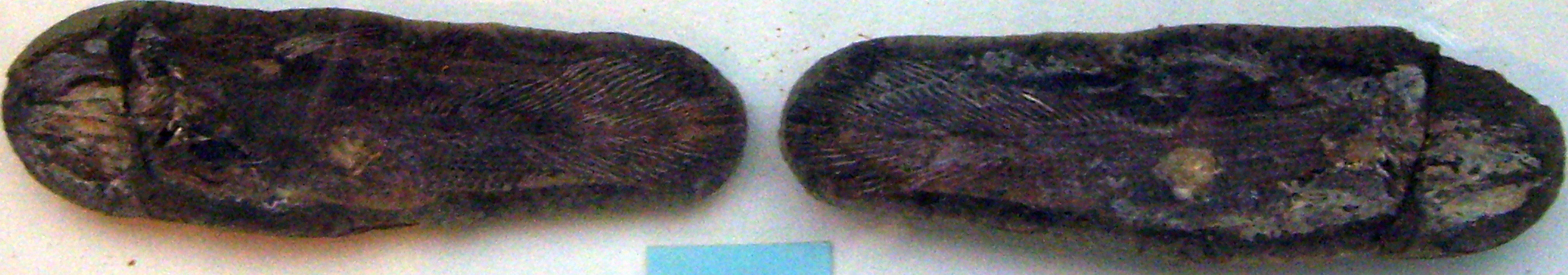
- Laugia slab and counterslab fossils at the Geological Museum in Copenhagen
- Skull diagram

Scientific classification
- Kingdom: Animalia
- Phylum: Chordata
- Class: Actinistia
- Order: Coelacanthiformes
- Family: †Laugiidae
- Genus: †Laugia; Stensiö, 1932
- Species: †L. groenlandica

Binomial name
- †Laugia groenlandica Stensiö, 1932

= Laugia =

Laugia Temporal range: Induan

Extinct genus of fishes

Laugia is an extinct genus of marine coelacanth fish which lived during the Induan age of the Early Triassic epoch in what is now Greenland. The type and only species, Laugia groenlandica, was collected from the Wordie Creek Formation and described by Erik Stensiö. The genus is named after Lauge Koch.

== Classification ==
Along with the Early Triassic Belemnocerca & Piveteauia, and the Late Jurassic Coccoderma, it forms the family Laugiidae. Laugia can be distinguished from other laugiids by its smaller number of tail fin rays: 17–18 in the top lobe and 13–14 in the bottom lobe, compared to 21–22 in the top lobe for the other two genera. Most other coelacanths have symmetrical numbers of tail fin rays.
