= Taiwan saddled carpetshark =

Conservation status
- Vulnerable (IUCN 3.1)

Scientific classification
- Kingdom: Animalia
- Phylum: Chordata
- Class: Chondrichthyes
- Subclass: Elasmobranchii
- Division: Selachii
- Order: Orectolobiformes
- Family: Parascylliidae
- Genus: Cirrhoscyllium
- Species: C. formosanum

Binomial name
- Cirrhoscyllium formosanum Teng, 1959
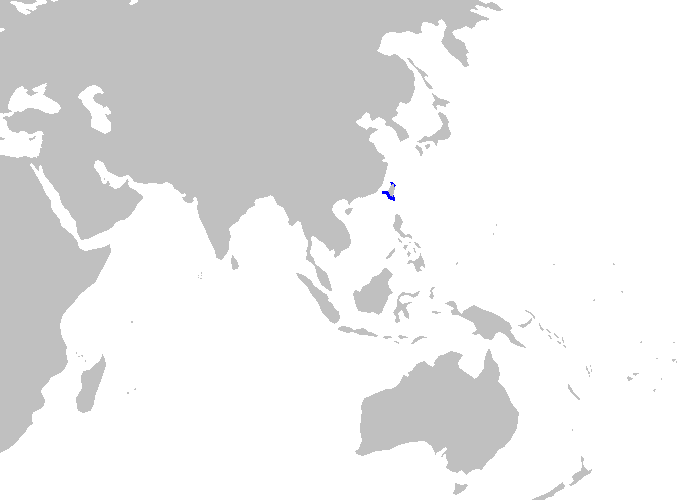
- Range of Taiwan saddled carpetshark (in blue)

Species of shark

The Taiwan saddled carpetshark (Cirrhoscyllium formosanum) is a carpetshark of the family Parascylliidae found around Taiwan, between latitudes 28°N and 21°N, at depths to 110 m. Its length is up to 39 cm.

Reproduction is oviparous.
