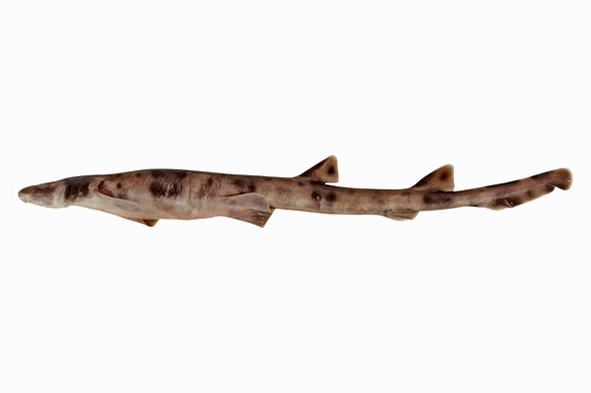

Conservation status
- Least Concern (IUCN 3.1)

Scientific classification
- Kingdom: Animalia
- Phylum: Chordata
- Class: Chondrichthyes
- Subclass: Elasmobranchii
- Division: Selachii
- Order: Orectolobiformes
- Family: Parascylliidae
- Genus: Parascyllium
- Species: P. collare

Binomial name
- Parascyllium collare E. P. Ramsay & J. D. Ogilby, 1888
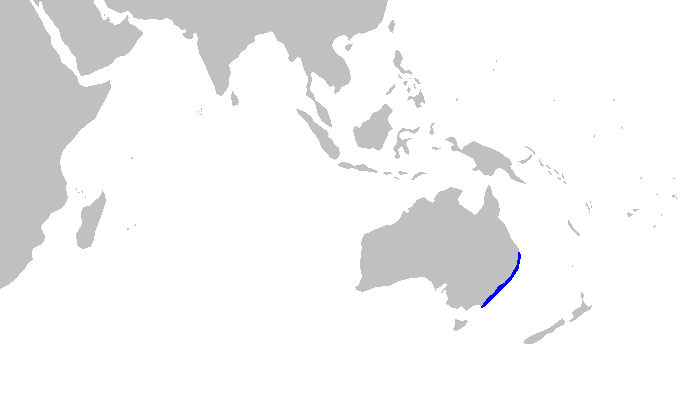
- Range of collared carpetshark (in blue)

= Collared carpetshark =

Species of shark

The collared carpetshark (Parascyllium collare) is a poorly understood species of carpetshark of the family Parascylliidae endemic to the waters of eastern Australia between latitudes 26°S and 38°S. It is typically found 55–128 m (180–420 ft) in depth near the floor of rocky reefs on the continental shelf, though its depth range can extend between 20 and 230 m (66 and 755 ft). At a maximum length of only 85 cm (2.79 ft), it poses no threat to humans. It is common within its range and is not targeted species. This, combined with high survival rates after discardment and a significant portion of habitat untouched by fishing are why it is listed as Least Concern by the International Union for Conservation of Nature (IUCN). Reproduction is oviparous and embryos feed solely on yolk.
