= Barbelthroat carpetshark =

Conservation status
- Data Deficient (IUCN 3.1)

Scientific classification
- Kingdom: Animalia
- Phylum: Chordata
- Class: Chondrichthyes
- Subclass: Elasmobranchii
- Division: Selachii
- Order: Orectolobiformes
- Family: Parascylliidae
- Genus: Cirrhoscyllium
- Species: C. expolitum

Binomial name
- Cirrhoscyllium expolitum H. M. Smith & Radcliffe, 1913
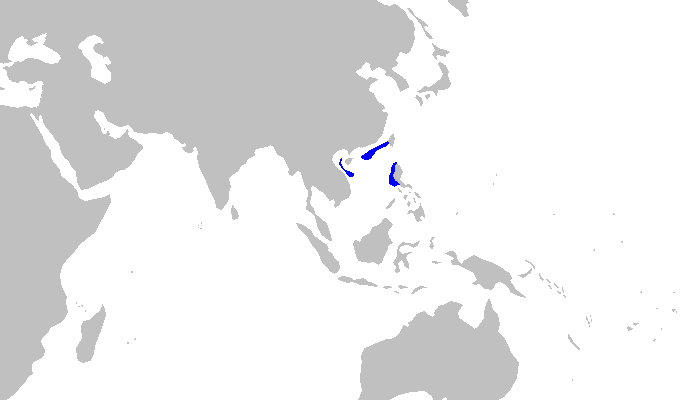
- Range of barbelthroat carpetshark (in blue)

Species of shark

The barbelthroat carpetshark (Cirrhoscyllium expolitum) is a carpetshark of the family Parascylliidae found in the South China Sea between Luzon in the Philippines and China, between latitudes 23°N and 10°N, at depths between 180 and 190 m. Its length is up to 34 cm.

Reproduction is oviparous.
