= Elongate carpet shark =

Conservation status
- Data Deficient (IUCN 3.1)

Scientific classification
- Kingdom: Animalia
- Phylum: Chordata
- Class: Chondrichthyes
- Subclass: Elasmobranchii
- Division: Selachii
- Order: Orectolobiformes
- Family: Parascylliidae
- Genus: Parascyllium
- Species: P. elongatum

Binomial name
- Parascyllium elongatum Last & Stevens, 2008

Species of shark

The elongate carpet shark (Parascyllium elongatum) is a species of carpetshark in the family Parascylliidae. It is known from a single female specimen 42.1 cm (16.6 in) long, recovered from the stomach of a school shark (Galeorhinus galeus) caught from a depth of 50 m (160 ft) off Chatham Island, Western Australia. It was described by P.R. Last and J.D. Stevens in 2008.
