= Palaeocentroscymnus =

Palaeocentroscymnus Temporal range: Maastrichtian–Serravallian

Scientific classification
- Kingdom: Animalia
- Phylum: Chordata
- Class: Chondrichthyes
- Subclass: Elasmobranchii
- Division: Selachii
- Order: Squaliformes
- Family: Somniosidae
- Genus: †Palaeocentroscymnus; Pollerspöck et al., 2018

Species
- †P. bavaricus Feichtinger et al. 2025; †P. horvathi Pollerspöck et al. 2018

Extinct genus of sharks

Palaeocentroscymnus is an extinct genus of small sleeper shark from the late Cretaceous to the Neogene of Eurasia. The fish is only known from teeth though based on the regions where the genus has been found, it has been suggested that it wound have lived in deeper water. Along with this, comparisons in the presence of the animal suggest that it was most common in low oxygen environments. Two species are currently recognized: P. horvathi and P. bavaricus.

== History and classification ==
The type species of Palaeocentroscymnus, P. horvathi, would first be named by Pollerspöck et al. in 2018 based on widespread material with the holotype being found about 10 kilometres (6.2 mi) from Wels during excavations done in 2013 and 2015. Other specimens of the species would be noted from multiple other sites including one the Gunma Prefecture of Japan along with the Cerová-Lieskové locality in the Slovak Republic. A second species, P. bavaricus, would later be named in 2025 by Feichtinger et al. based on specimens collected from an exposure located southeast of village Bergen. This species would expand the temporal range of the genus, with the most recent range suggesting a range from the Late Cretaceous to the earliest Neogene.

The name Palaeocentroscymnus derives from the Ancient Greek prefix "palaeo", which means old or ancient along with Centroscymnus, an extant genus of shark that the animal is most likely related to. The species name of the type species horvathi honors Juraj and Tereza Horvath along with their children. The species name of the second species references the district of Bavaria, the area in which the specimens where found.

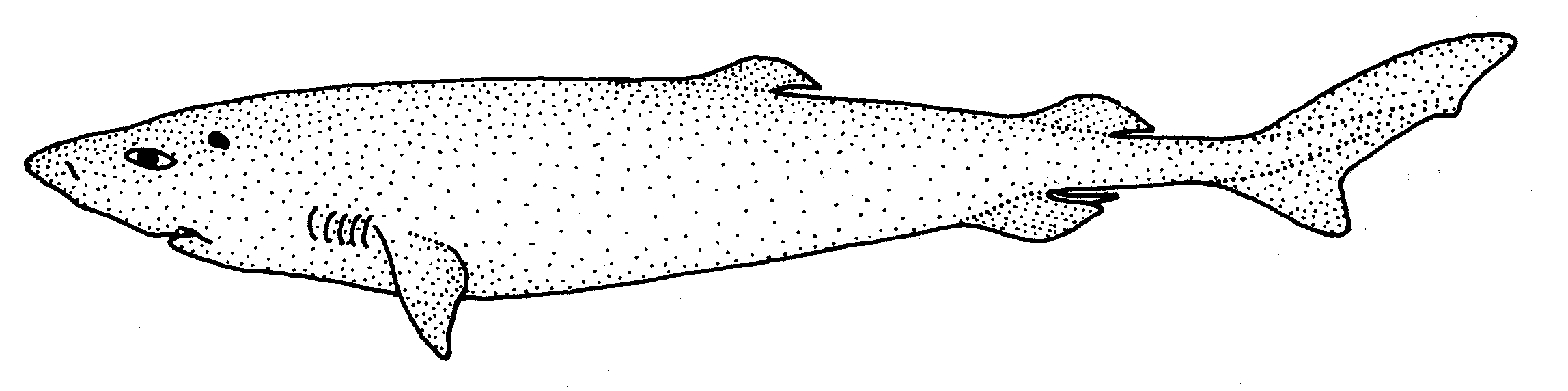
An illustration of the extant genus Scymnodalatias, a shark suggested to be closely related to Palaeocentroscymnus.

=== Classification ===
Before the 2018 paper describing the genus, the material that would be assigned to the genus Palaeocentroscymnus was originally assigned to a number of other genera with the first assignment being to Centroscymnus sp. by Barthelt et al. in 1991. This genus assignment would continue until 2013 where the lower teeth of the genus would be named as Paraetmopterus horvathi by Underwood and Schlögl. A single tooth would be assigned to the genus Etmopterus within the same paper. The current genus is placed within the family Somniosidae based on a number of features of the teeth of the lower jaw with a phylogenic analysis suggesting a placement of the genus close to multiple genera the material was originally assigned to. Within this analysis, Palaeocentroscymnus was suggested to be the sister taxon of a group containing Scymnodalatias cigalafulgosii and Centroscymnus cf. owstonii. Another analysis containing the genus would be done by Flammensbeck et al. in the same year would also place the genus as a member of Somniosidae along with suggesting a close relationship to Centroscymnus and Scymnodalatias.

Below is a section of the cladogram in Flammensbeck et al. (2018) focusing on the family Somniosidae.

- Somniosidae
  - - †Cretascymnus westfalicus
    - - †Cretascymnus adonis
      - - - †Rhinoscymnus viridiadamas
          - †Somniosus gonzalezi
        - - Somniosus rostratus
          - Somniosus microcephalus
  - - - - Centroscymnus coelolepis / owstonii
        - †Palaeocentroscymnus horvathi
      - - Centroscymnus owstonii
        - †Scymnodalatias cigalafulgosii
    - - - Scymnodalatias garricki
        - Zameus squamulosus
      - - Centroselachus crepidater
        - - - †Oxynotus crochardi
            - Oxynotus centrina / paradoxus
          - - Scymnodon ringens

== Description ==
Palaeocentroscymnus was generally a small shark with teeth from both the upper and lower jaws of known to have only a single cusp. The cutting edges of the teeth differ between species with some having smooth edges while others have sharp edges. The upper teeth are generally compact with a triangular tooth crown that is bent inwards on the lingual side. The exact morphology of these teeth differ between the positions of the mouth. While the posterior teeth are short and wide, the anterior teeth are more slender and the lateral teeth are taller. Similar to the crowns on some of the teeth, the root of the teeth on the upper dentition is compact with it being rectangular in shape. The root of these teeth form two lobes that differ between the position on the jaw with the most noticeable differences being at the symphysis of the jaw where in they are much more reduced than in other teeth.

The morphotype of the lower teeth, especially in proportions, are much different than the teeth on the upper dentition. The anterior and lateral teeth have tall roots compared to their relatively short crowns. All lower teeth possess a distal talon which does not reach past the main cusp of the tooth. The root of these teeth is rectangular and rather than the two lobes present on the upper teeth, they have a slight nick in the center of the bottom edge which would have reached a central foramen. The teeth at the edges of the mouth are generally different than the other teeth in the jaw, lacking the height of the rest of the teeth in the jaw.

=== Species ===
Species	Age	Location	Type Locality	Notes
P. bavaricus	Late Maastrichtian	Germany	Gerhartsreit Formation (Oberwaldgraben section)	Species whose upper teeth are wider and have a sharp cutting edge, the lower teeth are much more similar to the type species.
P. horvathi	Upper Egerian (Aquitanian)	Austria, Germany, Slovak Republic, Spain, Japan	Ebelsberg Formation (Graben)	Type species whose upper teeth are thinner and have a smooth cutting edge, lower teeth are much more similar to the other species.

== Paleobiology ==
Palaeocentroscymnus has a large range with material being known from western Europe and eastern Asia with in being known from environments which have been interpreted as in deeper water. Within this wide range, some sites such as the one in Slovakia would show that the shark was extremely common in its environment. At this site, the genus along with Squaliolus made up about 80% of the material found. This is in contrast to sites like the one that represents the Awa fauna in Japan where the genus is much less common with it being suggested that these sharks were mainly common in environments that were low in oxygen. Formations that the genus has been found in Japan has suggested paleoenvironments that are within the upper middle to lower middle Bathypelagic zone. The late Cretaceous fauna that P. bavaricus is also includes a number of other chondrichthyans including Squalus, Pararhincodon, and Scyliorhinus. In Miocene assemblages, the fauna has largely changed with genera such as Pristiophorus and Isistius but it still did share ecosystems with Squalus. Extant members of the family, such as Centroscymnus, have been noted to have a diet made up of cephalopods, fish, and crustaceans.
