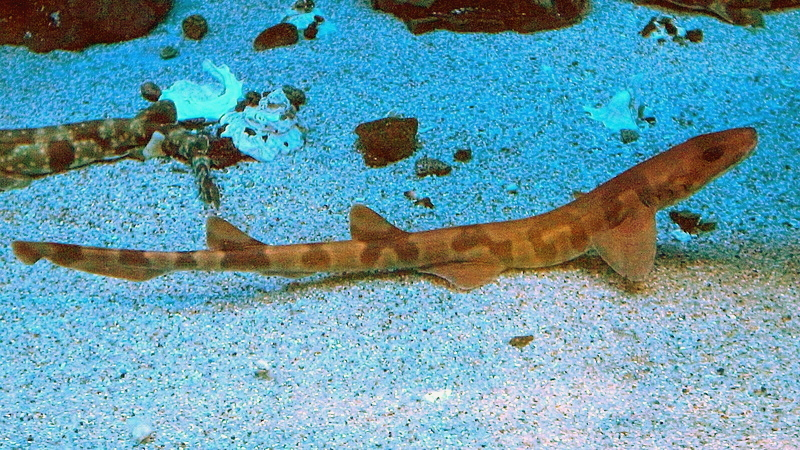

Conservation status
- Least Concern (IUCN 3.1)

Scientific classification
- Kingdom: Animalia
- Phylum: Chordata
- Class: Chondrichthyes
- Subclass: Elasmobranchii
- Division: Selachii
- Order: Orectolobiformes
- Family: Parascylliidae
- Genus: Cirrhoscyllium
- Species: C. japonicum

Binomial name
- Cirrhoscyllium japonicum Kamohara, 1943
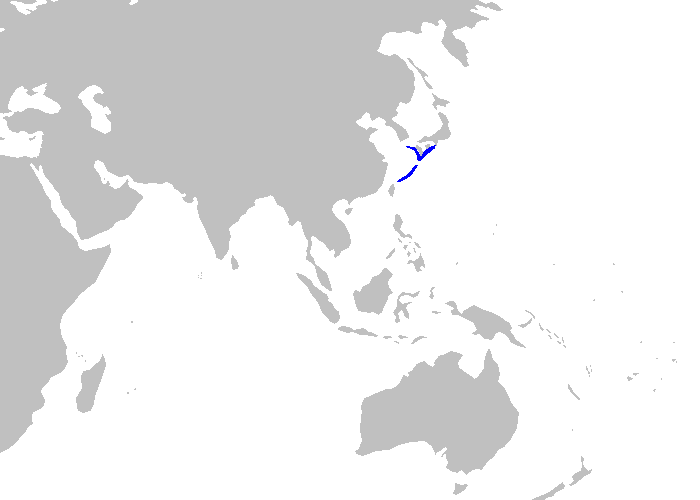
- Range of saddle carpetshark (in blue)

= Saddle carpetshark =

Species of shark

The saddle carpetshark (Cirrhoscyllium japonicum) is a carpet shark of the family Parascylliidae found around Japan, between latitudes 35°N and 24°N, at depths between 250 and 290 m (820 and 950 ft). The saddle carpetshark is known to grow up to 49 cm (19 in) in length, and it is an oviparous.
