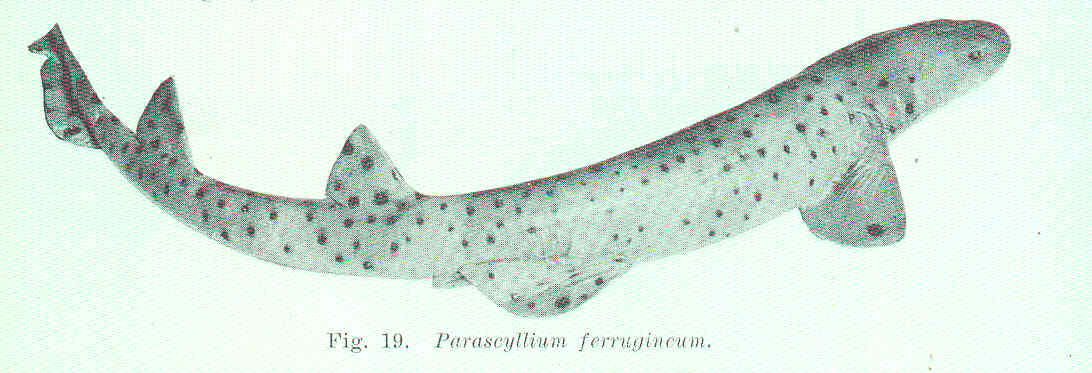
- Illustration of Parascyllium ferrugineum

Conservation status
- Least Concern (IUCN 3.1)

Scientific classification
- Kingdom: Animalia
- Phylum: Chordata
- Class: Chondrichthyes
- Subclass: Elasmobranchii
- Division: Selachii
- Order: Orectolobiformes
- Family: Parascylliidae
- Genus: Parascyllium
- Species: P. ferrugineum

Binomial name
- Parascyllium ferrugineum McCulloch, 1911
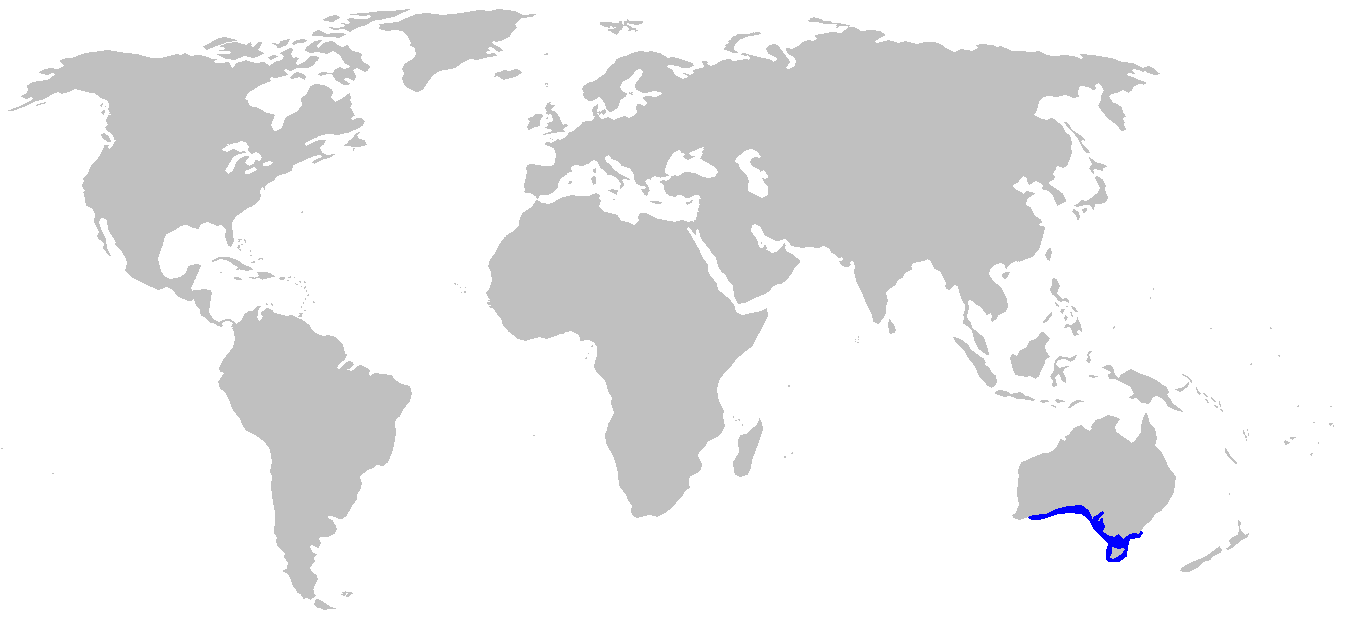
- Range of rusty carpetshark (in blue)

Synonyms
- Parascyllium multimaculatum Scott, 1935

= Rusty carpetshark =

Species of shark

The rusty carpetshark (Parascyllium ferrugineum) is a carpetshark of the family Parascylliidae found off southern Australia between latitudes 31°S and 41°S near the ocean floor on the continental shelf. It inhabits rocky reefs and seagrass beds 5–150 m (16–492 ft) in depth by night, hiding in caves by day. Its length is up to 80 cm (2.6 ft) TL and it feeds on crustaceans and molluscs. Reproduction is oviparous, with pups being born at 17 cm (6.7 in) in length.
