= Ginger carpetshark =

Conservation status
- Data Deficient (IUCN 3.1)

Scientific classification
- Kingdom: Animalia
- Phylum: Chordata
- Class: Chondrichthyes
- Subclass: Elasmobranchii
- Division: Selachii
- Order: Orectolobiformes
- Family: Parascylliidae
- Genus: Parascyllium
- Species: P. sparsimaculatum

Binomial name
- Parascyllium sparsimaculatum T. Goto & Last, 2002
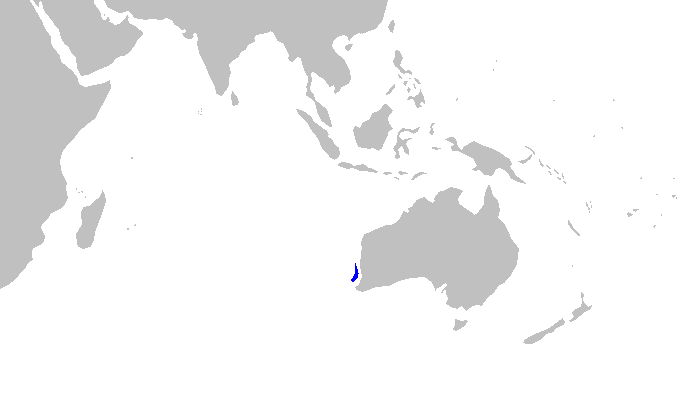
- Range of ginger carpetshark (in blue)

Species of shark

The ginger carpetshark (Parascyllium sparsimaculatum) is a species of carpetshark of the family Parascylliidae endemic to the waters of western Australia. It is a small fish at only 78.1 cm (2.56 ft) TL in length in females and harmless to humans. Its depth range is 204–245 m (669–804 ft) on the upper continental shelf. It is known from only three specimens, so biological and population data are lacking. It is likely not under threat due to its depth range, but its limited range may make it vulnerable to fishing. Reproduction is oviparous and embryos feed solely on yolk.
