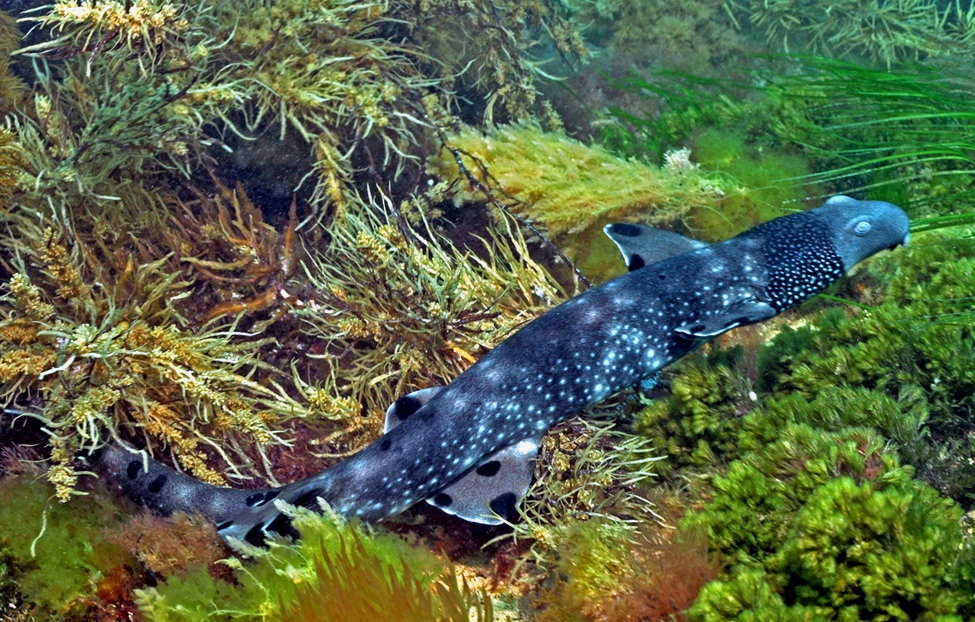
- The necklace carpetshark is usually found on or near the ocean floor.

Conservation status
- Least Concern (IUCN 3.1)

Scientific classification
- Kingdom: Animalia
- Phylum: Chordata
- Class: Chondrichthyes
- Subclass: Elasmobranchii
- Division: Selachii
- Order: Orectolobiformes
- Family: Parascylliidae
- Genus: Parascyllium
- Species: P. variolatum

Binomial name
- Parascyllium variolatum (A. H. A. Duméril, 1853)
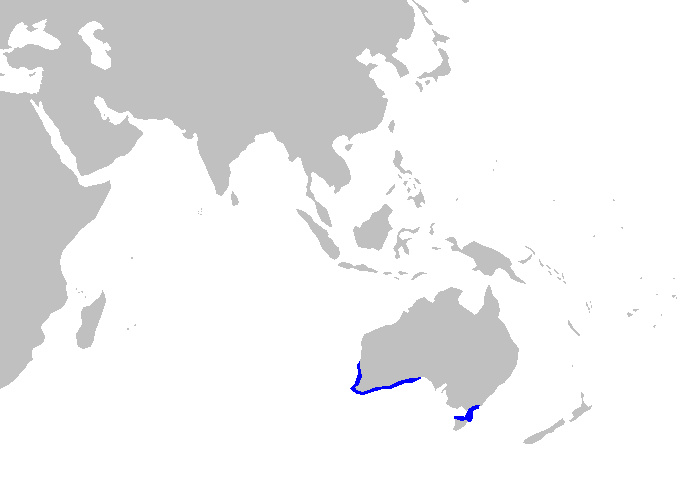
- Range of necklace carpetshark (in blue)

Synonyms
- Hemiscyllium variolatum Duméril, 1853; Parascyllium nuchalis McCoy, 1874

= Necklace carpetshark =

Species of shark

The necklace carpetshark (Parascyllium variolatum), also known as the varied carpetshark, is a carpetshark of the family Parascylliidae endemic to the waters off Australia's southern coast between latitudes 37°S and 41°S. It is found near the ocean floor over sand, rock, coral reefs, and kelp and seagrass beds at depths down to 180 m (590 ft). It is almost exclusively seen at night and spends the day hidden in caves or camouflaged on the ocean floor.

With a slender, elongated body and a maximum length of only 91.0 cm TL, it is harmless to humans. The tail is long, but difficult to tell apart from the rest of the shark. Its body is grey to brown in color with a broad black collar, from which it gets its name, and white spots along its body. It has small spiracles and nostrils with short barbels, likely used for sensory purposes. It is often mistaken for a species of catshark, despite being more closely related to wobbegongs and nurse sharks.

It is a nocturnal predator and feeds mostly on shellfish. Reproduction is oviparous with females laying eggs with curled tendrils that anchor them to the ocean floor. The embryos feed on yolk.
