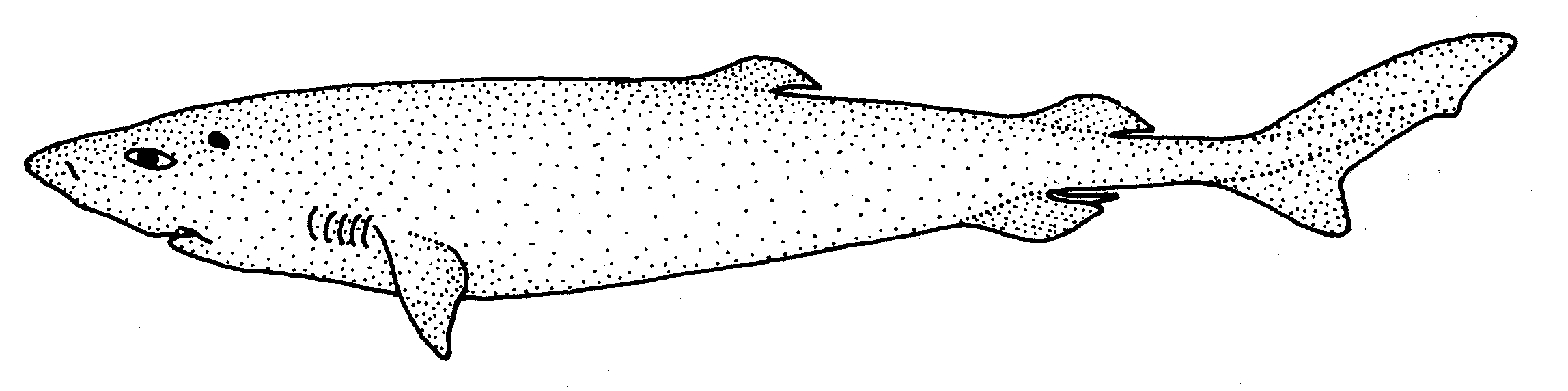
- Drawing by Dr Tony Ayling

Conservation status
- Data Deficient (IUCN 3.1)

Scientific classification
- Kingdom: Animalia
- Phylum: Chordata
- Class: Chondrichthyes
- Subclass: Elasmobranchii
- Division: Selachii
- Order: Squaliformes
- Family: Somniosidae
- Genus: Scymnodalatias
- Species: S. sherwoodi

Binomial name
- Scymnodalatias sherwoodi (Archey, 1921)
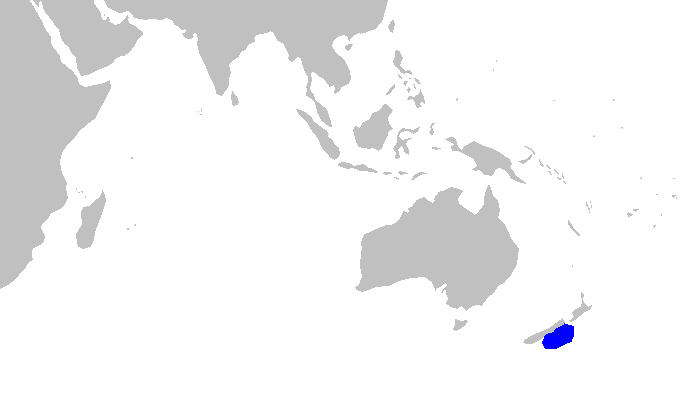
- Range of the Sherwood dogfish (in blue)

= Sherwood dogfish =

Species of shark

The sherwood dogfish or Sherwood's dogfish (Scymnodalatias sherwoodi) is a very rare sleeper shark of the family Somniosidae, found only around New Zealand. The only specimen studied was about 80 cm long.

The sherwood dogfish is ovoviviparous.

== Conservation status ==
In June 2018 the New Zealand Department of Conservation classified the sherwood dogfish as "Not Threatened" with the qualifier "Secure Overseas" under the New Zealand Threat Classification System.
