= Apedolepis =

Apedolepis Temporal range: Upper Ordovician (Caradoc)

Scientific classification
- Kingdom: Animalia
- Phylum: Chordata
- Infraphylum: Agnatha
- Class: †Pteraspidomorpha
- Subclass: †Arandaspida
- Genus: †Apedolepis; Young, 1997

Species
- A. tomlinsonae Young 1997

Extinct genus of Pteraspidomorph fish

Apedolepis (meaning "flat scale") was an extinct genus of early jawless fish known from the Ordovician period Stokes Formation of central Australia. The only species in this genus is A. tomlinsonae making it a monotypic genus. The scales of Apedolepis are characterized by an atubular laminar surface tissue of uncertain histology, lacking a distinct base.

== Discovery ==
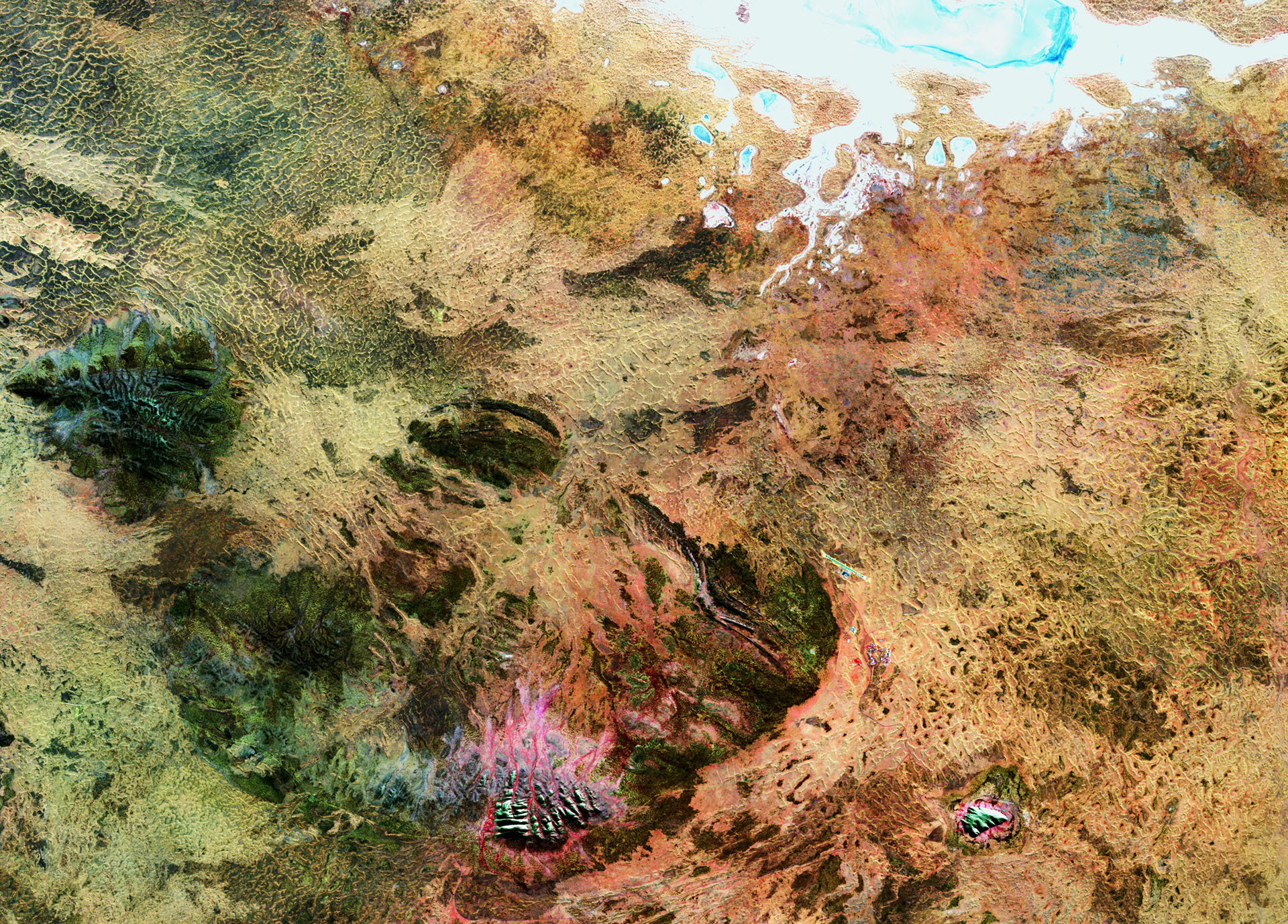
View of Amadeus Basin in central Australia.

All existing material was collected in the Areyonga Creek section of the eastern Gardiner Range in the Stokes Formation, Amadeus Basin, central Australia. Apedolepis is known solely from scales, with the type specimen (CPC 33630) consisting of a single scale.

The genus name means "flat scale" which is derived from Greek ἄπεδοςi, apedos, meaning 'even', 'flat', or 'level' and λεπίς, meaning 'scale'.
