= Tesakoviaspis =

Tesakoviaspis Temporal range: Middle Ordovician

Scientific classification
- Kingdom: Animalia
- Phylum: Chordata
- Class: Pteraspidomorphi
- Subclass: Astraspida
- Order: Tesakoviaspidida
- Family: Tesakoviaspididae
- Genus: Tesakoviaspis Karatajūtė-Talimaa 1978 ex Karatajūtė-Talimaa & Meredith-Smith 2004

Species
- T. concentrica Karatajūtė-Talimaa 1978 ex Karatajūtė-Talimaa & Meredith-Smith 2004

Extinct genus of jawless fishes

Tesakoviaspis concentrica is an extinct species of primitive jawless fish from the Middle Ordovician.
