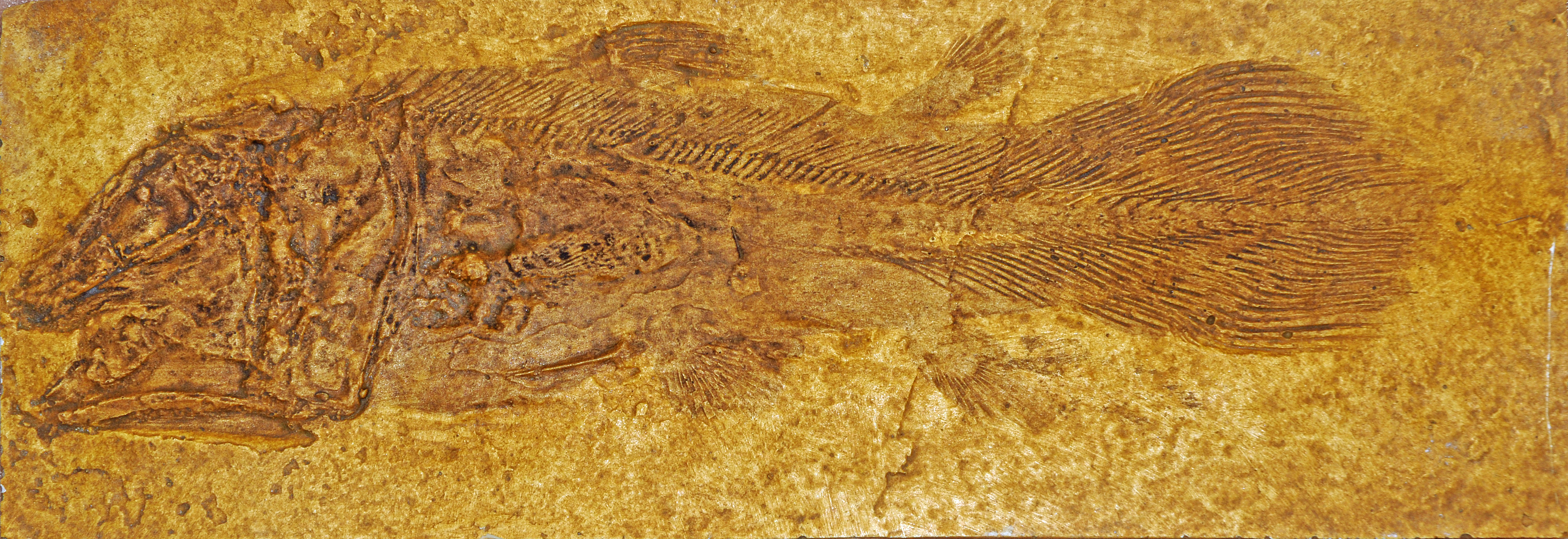
- Coccoderma bavaricum

Scientific classification
- Kingdom: Animalia
- Phylum: Chordata
- Class: Actinistia
- Order: Coelacanthiformes
- Family: †Laugiidae; Stensiö, 1932

Genera
- †Belemnocerca Wendruff & Wilson, 2012; †Coccoderma Quenstdedt, 1858; †Laugia Stensiö, 1932; ?†Piveteauia Lehman, 1952

= Laugiidae =

Laugiidae Temporal range: Early Triassic to Late Jurassic

Extinct family of fishes

Laugiidae is an extinct family of prehistoric marine coelacanths which lived during the Triassic and Jurassic periods. Their fossils have been found in Canada, Germany and Greenland.

They are notable for the extreme temporal disjunction seen between genera; two genera, Laugia and Belemnocerca, are known from the Early Triassic, and another (Coccoderma) is known from the Late Jurassic, leaving a ghost lineage spanning 100 million years between these two time periods. The presence of Coccoderma in the Late Jurassic makes Laugiidae the latest surviving non-latimerioid coelacanth lineage; almost all other non-latimerioid coelacanths were extinct by the Carnian stage of the Late Triassic, leaving only the latimerioids (Latimeriidae and Mawsoniidae) as the dominant coelacanth groups. It has been estimated that the laugiids diverged from the latimerioids and allied taxa (such as the Whiteiidae) during the Early Permian.

== Included genera ==
- †Belemnocerca Wendruff & Wilson, 2012
- †Coccoderma Quenstdedt, 1858
- †Laugia Stensiö, 1932 (type)

A potential indeterminate genus is known from the Late Triassic of China. The Carboniferous genus Synaptotylus was previously included in this family, but is no longer thought to be a member.

Some studies indicate that the genus Piveteauia, known from the Early Triassic of Madagascar and previously considered a member of the Whiteiidae, may actually be a laugiid.
