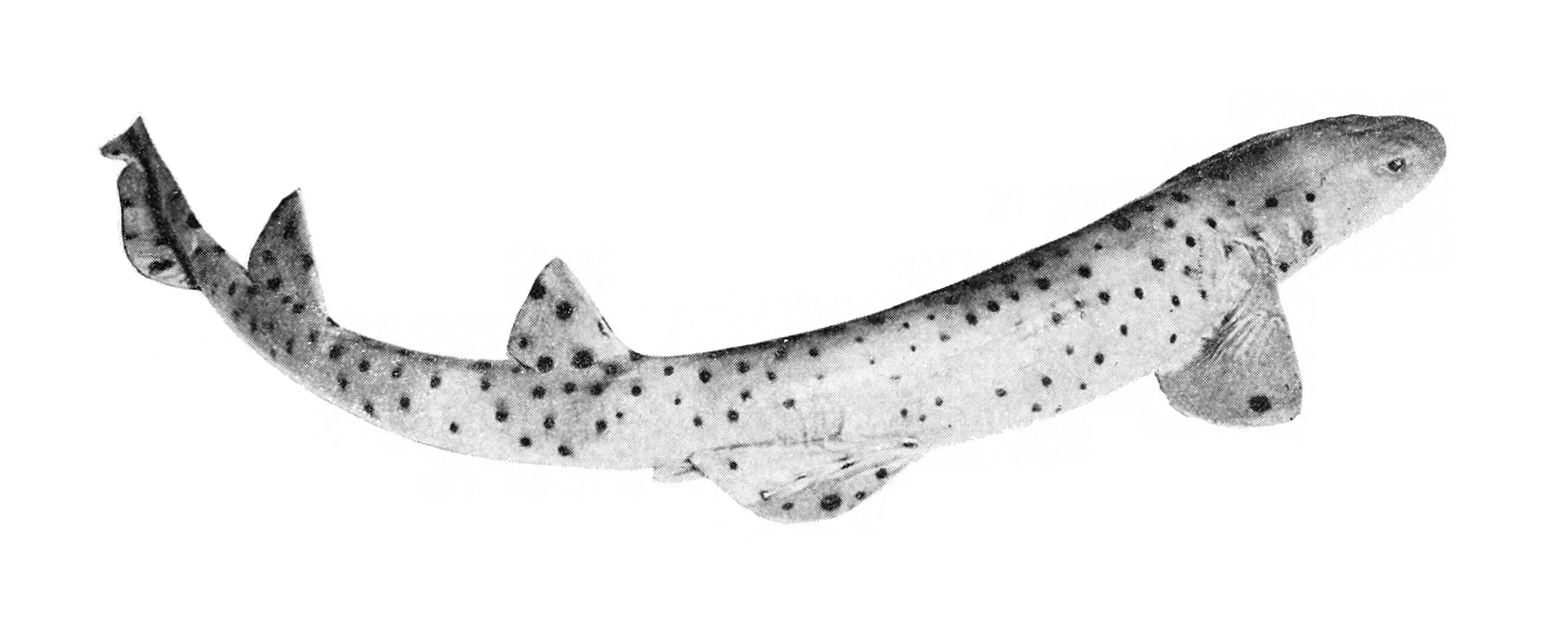
- Parascyllium ferrugineum

Scientific classification
- Kingdom: Animalia
- Phylum: Chordata
- Class: Chondrichthyes
- Subclass: Elasmobranchii
- Division: Selachii
- Order: Orectolobiformes
- Family: Parascylliidae
- Genus: Parascyllium; T. N. Gill, 1862

= Parascyllium =

Genus of sharks

Parascyllium is a genus of carpetsharks in the family Parascylliidae. Species in this genus are distributed in waters around Australia.

== Species ==
- Parascyllium collare E. P. Ramsay & Ogilby, 1888 (collared carpetshark)
- Parascyllium elongatum Last & Stevens, 2008 (elongate carpetshark)
- Parascyllium ferrugineum McCulloch, 1911 (rusty carpetshark)
- Parascyllium sparsimaculatum T. Goto & Last, 2002 (ginger carpetshark)
- Parascyllium variolatum A. H. A. Duméril, 1853 (necklace carpetshark)
