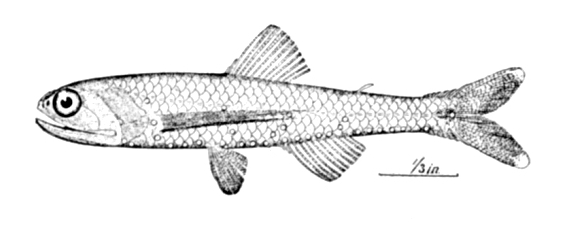

Scientific classification
- Kingdom: Animalia
- Phylum: Chordata
- Class: Actinopterygii
- Order: Myctophiformes
- Family: Myctophidae
- Genus: Lepidophanes
- Species: L. guentheri

Binomial name
- Lepidophanes guentheri Goode & T. H. Bean, 1896

= Lepidophanes guentheri =

Species of fish

Lepidophanes gaussi, known as Günther's lanternfish, is a species of lanternfish distributed in the Atlantic Ocean between about 45°N and 50°S. They use their lights as a form of communication with other lanternfish, such as when feeding or as a prelude to mating.
