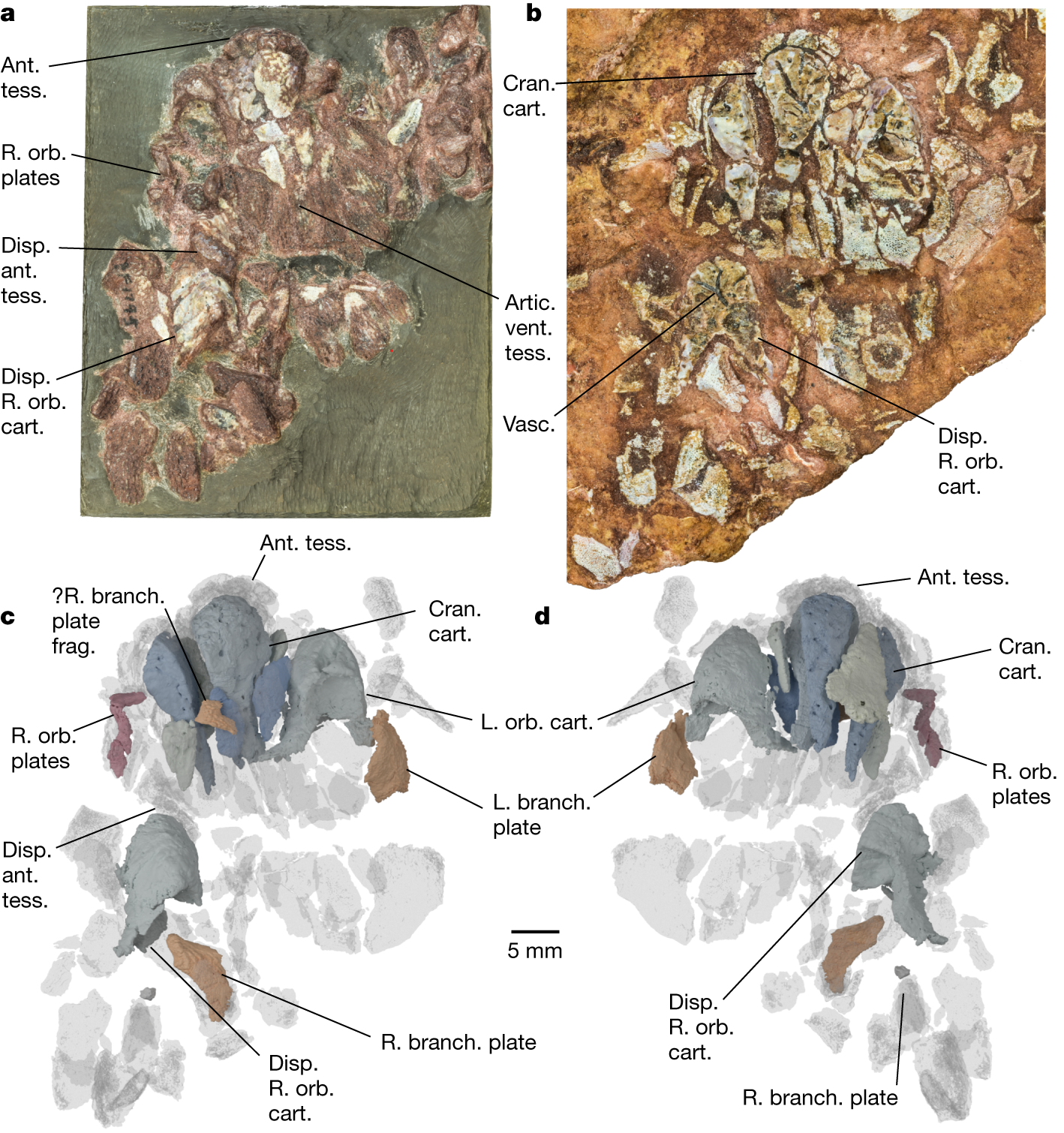
- Specimen of Eriptychius americanus

Scientific classification
- Kingdom: Animalia
- Phylum: Chordata
- Infraphylum: Agnatha
- Class: †Pteraspidomorpha
- Subclass: †Heterostracomorphi
- Infraclass: †Eriptychiida; Tarlo 1962
- Order: †Eriptychiiformes; Ørvig 1958

Families
- Eriptychiidae; Oniscolepididae

= Eriptychiida =

Eriptychiida Temporal range: Late Ordovician, 450 Ma

Extinct order of jawless fishes

Eriptychiida is an extinct marine taxon of vertebrate in the group Pteraspidomorphi.

The order contains the genus, Eriptychius, and fossilized specimens from this genus have been found in the Gull River Formation of Ontario, the Harding Formation of Colorado, and the Bighorn Dolomite of Wyoming. The group contains two documented species: Eriptychius americanus and Eriptychius orvigi.

== Characteristics ==
The structure of the dentine of eriptychiids is in many respects closer to that of heterostracans than to that of astraspids. This is the only argument to place them, as the closest relatives to heterostracans, among the Ordovician vertebrates. A 450 million years old fossil of eriptychius shows it had a skull consisting of separate cartilage plates, with the frontal plates being mineralized, and that a thin body armor covered the head. It appears to be the first step towards a more solid braincase in vertebrates.

== Taxonomy ==
- Order †Eriptychiiformes Ørvig 1958
  - Genus ?†Eleochera Sansom & Smith 2005
  - Family †Eriptychiidae Tarlo 1962
    - Genus †Eriptychius Walcott 1892
  - Family †Oniscolepididae Märss & Karatajūtė-Talimaa 2009
    - Genus †Kallostrakon Lankester 1870
    - Genus †Oniscolepis Pander 1856 non Groß 1961 [Strosipherus Pander 1856]

In study at 2023, Eriptychius is placed just under Vertebrata, not considering class or order.

== Sea also ==
- Fish
