= Synaptotylus =

Scientific classification
- Domain: Eukaryota
- Kingdom: Animalia
- Phylum: Chordata
- Clade: Sarcopterygii
- Class: Actinistia
- Family: †Laugiidae
- Genus: †Synaptotylus; Echols, 1963
- Species: †S. newelli

Binomial name
- †Synaptotylus newelli (Hibbard, 1933)

Extinct genus of fishes

Synaptotylus is an extinct genus of prehistoric sarcopterygians or lobe-finned fish from the Pennsylvanian. The type species is Synaptotylus newelli (Hibbard 1933).

== See also ==
- Sarcopterygii
- List of sarcopterygians
- List of prehistoric bony fish
