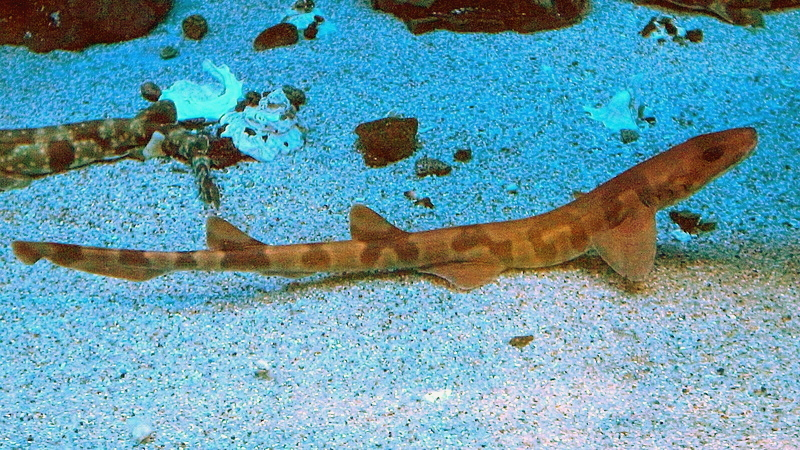
- Saddle carpetshark (Cirrhoscyllium japonicum)

Scientific classification
- Kingdom: Animalia
- Phylum: Chordata
- Class: Chondrichthyes
- Subclass: Elasmobranchii
- Division: Selachii
- Order: Orectolobiformes
- Family: Parascylliidae
- Genus: Cirrhoscyllium; H. M. Smith & Radcliffe, 1913

= Cirrhoscyllium =

Genus of sharks

Cirrhoscyllium is a genus of carpetsharks in the family Parascylliidae.

Species in the genus Cirrhoscyllium have throat barbels which are believed to act as tactile sensory organ, detecting movement or changes in water flow.

== Species ==
- Cirrhoscyllium expolitum H. M. Smith & Radcliffe, 1913 (barbelthroat carpetshark)
- Cirrhoscyllium formosanum Teng, 1959 (Taiwan saddled carpetshark)
- Cirrhoscyllium japonicum Kamohara, 1943 (saddle carpetshark)

== Sources ==
- Froese, Rainer; Pauly, Daniel (eds.). "Species in genus Cirrhoscyllium". FishBase. February 2011 version.
