= Longfin lanternfish =

Conservation status
- Least Concern (IUCN 3.1)

Scientific classification
- Kingdom: Animalia
- Phylum: Chordata
- Class: Actinopterygii
- Order: Myctophiformes
- Family: Myctophidae
- Genus: Diogenichthys
- Species: D. atlanticus

Binomial name
- Diogenichthys atlanticus Tåning, 1928

Species of fish

The longfin lanternfish (Diogenichthys atlanticus) is a species of oceanodromous lanternfish that is oviparous, and a host of Sarcotretes scopeli.

== Distribution and habitat ==
It is a widespread species that lives in oceans like the Atlantic, Pacific, and Indian Ocean. It lives from 18 to 1,250 meters below the ocean surface. It can be found at 400 to 930 meters deep during the day, and 18 to 1,050 meters deep at night.

== Description ==
It grows up to a length of 2.9 cm. It has 11 to 12 dorsal finrays, 16 to 17 anal finrays, and 14 pectoral finrays.

== Conservation ==
It is an abundant species of fish, with a stable population, with no known threats, and occurs in many marine protected areas, so the IUCN Red List considers it a Least Concern species.

== Synonymised names ==
Put by the World Register of Marine Species.

- Diogenichthye atlanticus Tåning, 1928 (misspelling)
- Diogenichthys atlanticum (Tåning, 1928)
- Diogenichthys scofieldi Bolin, 1939
- Myctophum laternatum atlanticum Tåning, 1928
