= Whitetail dogfish =

Conservation status
- Data Deficient (IUCN 3.1)

Scientific classification
- Kingdom: Animalia
- Phylum: Chordata
- Class: Chondrichthyes
- Subclass: Elasmobranchii
- Division: Selachii
- Order: Squaliformes
- Family: Somniosidae
- Genus: Scymnodalatias
- Species: S. albicauda

Binomial name
- Scymnodalatias albicauda Taniuchi & Garrick, 1986
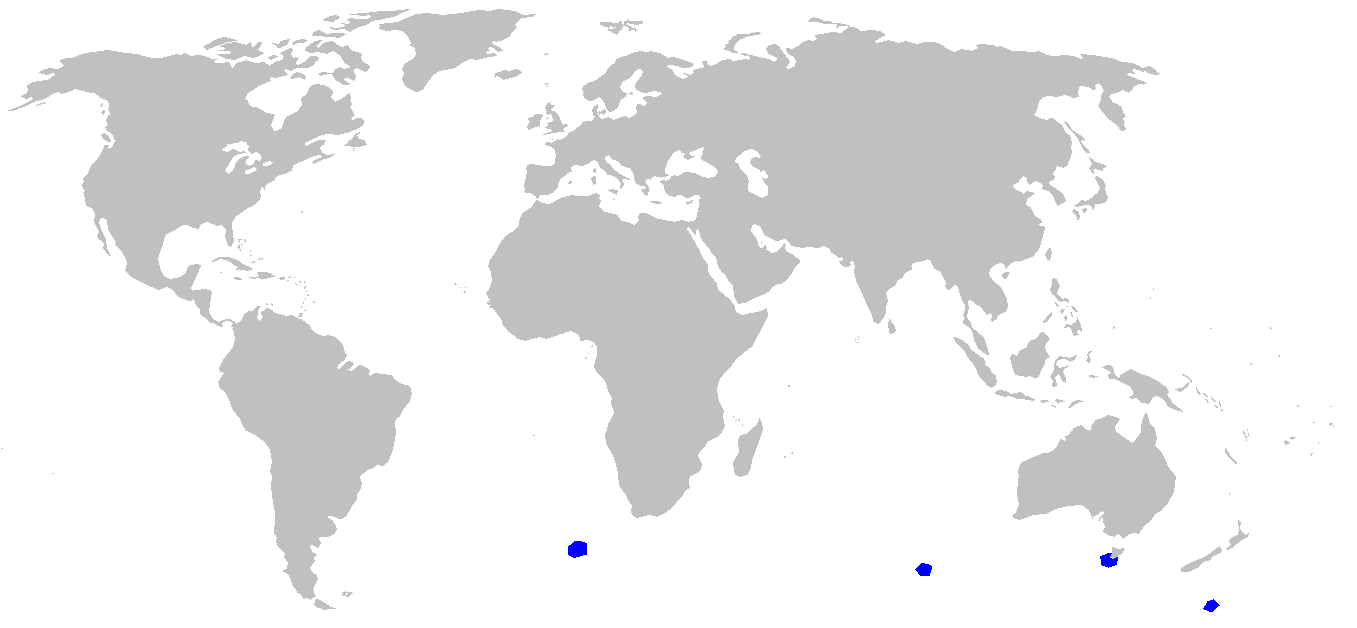
- Range of the whitetail dogfish (in blue)

Species of shark

The whitetail dogfish (Scymnodalatias albicauda) is a very rare sleeper shark of the family Somniosidae, found in the eastern Indian Ocean around southern Australia and New Zealand, at depths of between 150 and 500 m. Its length is up to 1.1 m.

The whitetail dogfish is a rare species known only from a few specimens taken by tuna longliners and trawlers. The dorsal fins are small, the pectoral fins are angular, and there is an asymmetric caudal fin with a dark-tipped upper lobe. Coloration is grey and white, mottled with large brown or black spots, the tail mostly white with black tips.

The whitetail dogfish is ovoviviparous, with at least 59 pups per litter.

== Conservation status ==
In June 2018 the New Zealand Department of Conservation classified the whitetail dogfish as "Data Deficient" with the qualifier "Uncertain whether Secure Overseas" under the New Zealand Threat Classification System.
