= Lepidophanes gaussi =

Scientific classification
- Domain: Eukaryota
- Kingdom: Animalia
- Phylum: Chordata
- Class: Actinopterygii
- Order: Myctophiformes
- Family: Myctophidae
- Genus: Lepidophanes
- Species: L. gaussi

Binomial name
- Lepidophanes gaussi Brauer, 1906

Species of fish

Lepidophanes gaussi is a species of lanternfish distributed in the North Atlantic and South Atlantic gyres.
