= Malhada Vermelha Formation =

Geological formation in northeastern Brazil

- Stratigraphic range: Valanginian-Hauterivian; ~138–130 Ma
- Type: Geological formation
- Unit of: Iguatu Group
- Underlies: Lima Campos Formation
- Overlies: Quixoá Formation
- Thickness: 500–800 m (1,600–2,600 ft)

Lithology
- Primary: Sandstone
- Other: Siltstone

Location
- Coordinates: 6.3°S 39.1°W
- Approximate paleocoordinates: 4.5°S 6.2°W
- Region: Ceará
- Country: Brazil
- Extent: Lima Campos & Malhada Vermelha Basins
- Malhada Vermelha Formation (Brazil)

The Malhada Vermelha Formation is an Early Cretaceous (Valanginian to Hauterivian) geologic formation in Ceará, northeastern Brazil. The formation preserves reptile, fish and ichnofossils.

== Description ==
The formation is characterized by a cyclic sequence of siltstones that are intercalated with fine to medium sandstones with the presence of festoon cross-stratification and climbing ripples, deposited in an alluvial environment in a hot semiarid paleoclimate.

The formation crops out in two minibasins, the Lima Campos and eponymous Malhada Vermelha Basins. The 500 to 800 metres (1,600 to 2,600 ft) thick formation overlies the Quixoá Formation and is overlain by the Lima Campos Formation.

== Fossil content ==
The following fossils were reported from the formation:

- Fish
  - cf. Lepidotes sp.
  - Hybodontidae indet.
  - Planohybodus marki
- Reptiles
  - Crocodylomorpha indet.
- Ichnofossils
  - Taenidium barretti
  - Carnosauria indet.

== See also ==
- Crato Formation
- Romualdo Formation
- Missão Velha Formation
