= Potobatis =

Potobatis Temporal range: Danian

Scientific classification
- Kingdom: Animalia
- Phylum: Chordata
- Class: Chondrichthyes
- Subclass: Elasmobranchii
- Order: Myliobatiformes
- Superfamily: Dasyatoidea
- Genus: †Potobatis
- Species: †P. semperei

Binomial name
- †Potobatis semperei Cappetta & Gayet, 2013

Genus of fishes

Potobatis is an extinct genus of dasyatoid that lived during the Danian stage of the Palaeocene epoch.

== Distribution ==
Potobatis semperei is known from the El Molino Formation of Bolivia.
