= Chiloscyllium vulloi =

Chiloscyllium vulloi Temporal range: Late Cretaceous

Scientific classification
- Kingdom: Animalia
- Phylum: Chordata
- Class: Chondrichthyes
- Subclass: Elasmobranchii
- Division: Selachii
- Order: Orectolobiformes
- Family: Hemiscylliidae
- Genus: Chiloscyllium
- Species: †C. vulloi

Binomial name
- †Chiloscyllium vulloi Guinot et al., 2013

Extinct species of shark

Chiloscyllium vulloi is an extinct species of Chiloscyllium that lived during the Late Cretaceous.

== Distribution ==
Chiloscyllium vulloi is known from fossils found in France.
