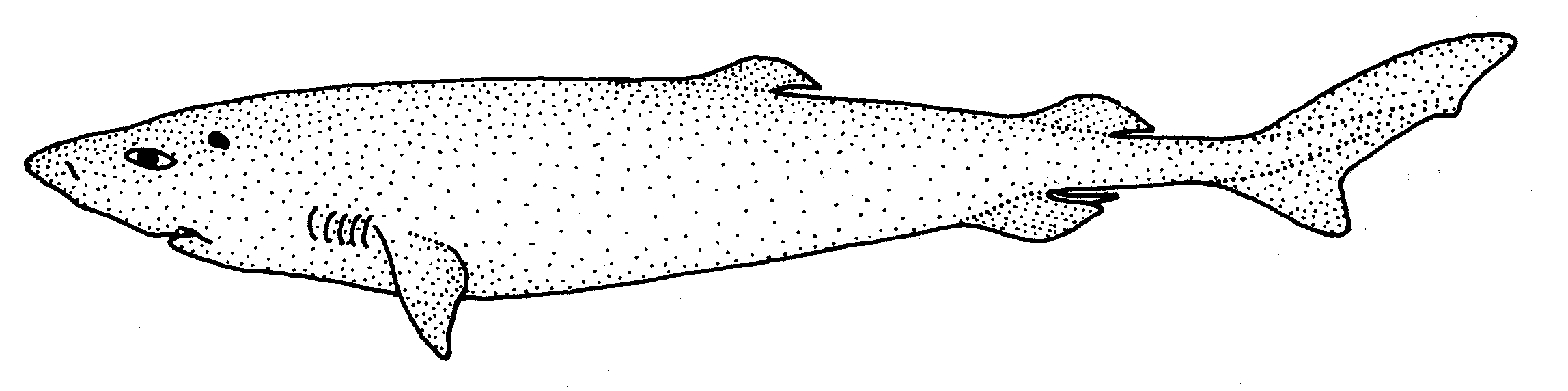
- Sherwood dogfish Scymnodalatias sherwoodi Drawing by Dr Tony Ayling

Scientific classification
- Kingdom: Animalia
- Phylum: Chordata
- Class: Chondrichthyes
- Subclass: Elasmobranchii
- Division: Selachii
- Order: Squaliformes
- Family: Somniosidae
- Genus: Scymnodalatias; Garrick, 1956

= Scymnodalatias =

Genus of sharks

Scymnodalatias is a genus of squaliform sharks in the family Somniosidae.

== Species ==
- Scymnodalatias albicauda Taniuchi & Garrick, 1986 (whitetail dogfish)
- †Scymnodalatias cigalafulgosii (Adnet, 2006)
- Scymnodalatias garricki Kukuev & Konovalenko, 1988 (Azores dogfish)
- Scymnodalatias oligodon Kukuev & Konovalenko, 1988 (sparsetooth dogfish)
- Scymnodalatias sherwoodi (Archey, 1921) (Sherwood's dogfish)
