= Scyliorhinotheca =

Scyliorhinotheca Temporal range: Late Eocene

Scientific classification
- Domain: Eukaryota
- Kingdom: Animalia
- Phylum: Chordata
- Class: Chondrichthyes
- Subclass: Elasmobranchii
- Division: Selachii
- Order: Carcharhiniformes
- Family: Scyliorhinidae
- Genus: †Scyliorhinotheca; Kiel, Peckmann & Simon, 2012
- Species: †S. goederti

Binomial name
- †Scyliorhinotheca goederti Kiel, Peckmann & Simon, 2012

Extinct genus of sharks

Scyliorhinotheca is an extinct genus of cartilaginous fish first described in 2012 from the state of Washington. It contains only one species, Scyliorhinotheca goederti.
