= Ritchieichthys =

Ritchieichthys Temporal range: Katian

Scientific classification
- Kingdom: Animalia
- Phylum: Chordata
- Infraphylum: Agnatha
- Class: †Pteraspidomorpha
- Subclass: †Arandaspida
- Genus: †Ritchieichthys
- Species: †R. nibili

Binomial name
- †Ritchieichthys nibili Sansom et al., 2013

Ritchieichthys is an extinct genus of arandaspid fish that lived during the Late Ordovician (Katian stage) in the Nibili Formation of the Canning Basin in Western Australia. The only species in this genus is Ritchieichthys nibili making it a monotypic genus. It has cellular dentine which forms the bulk of the dermal armor ornament.

== Discovery ==
It was discovered in Western Australia in the Nibili Formation of the Canning Basin. The discovery of Ritchieichthys nibili represents the first documented record of a fish from the Ordovician period of the Canning Basin.
