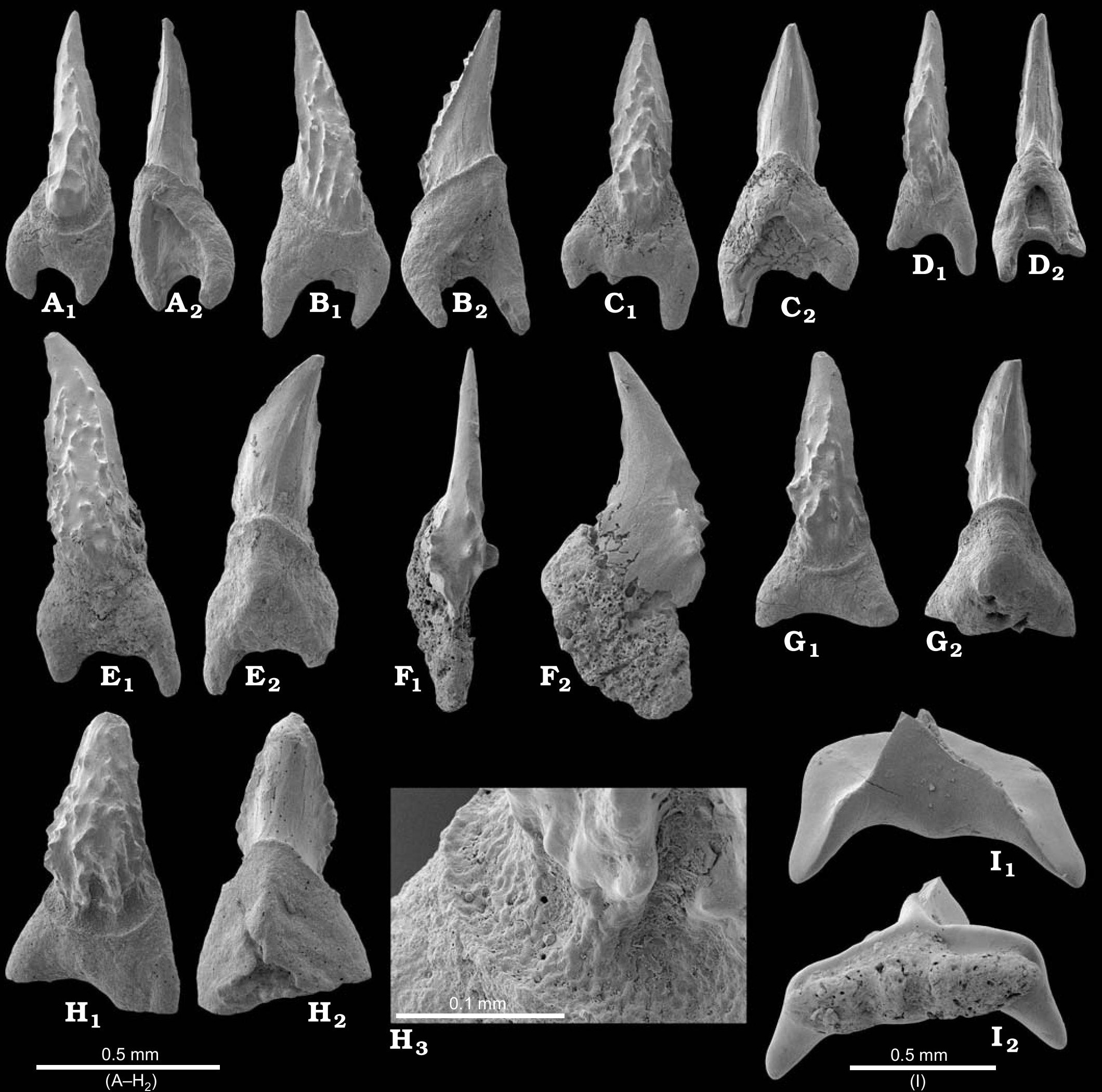
- A–H. Nannocetorhinus tuberculatus teeth. A) Holotype, I) Gymnura sp.

Scientific classification
- Kingdom: Animalia
- Phylum: Chordata
- Clade: Eugnathostomata
- Class: Chondrichthyes
- Clade: Euselachii
- Subclass: Elasmobranchii
- Genus: †Nanocetorhinus; Underwood & Schlogl, 2013

Type species
- †Nanocetorhinus tuberculatus Underwood & Schlogl, 2013

Other species
- †Nanocetorhinus zeitlingeri Feichtinger, Pollerspöck & Harzhauser, 2020

= Nanocetorhinus =

Nanocetorhinus Temporal range: Late Oligocene–Middle Miocene

Extinct genus of cartilaginous fishes

Nanocetorhinus is an extinct genus of cartilaginous fishes in the subclass Neoselachii from the Late Oligocene to Middle Miocene. The type species N. tuberculatus lived across the Northern Hemisphere during the Early to Middle Miocene, and the second species N. zeitlingeri lived in Austria during the Late Oligocene.

== Discovery and naming ==
Nanocetorhinus tuberculatus was described by Underwood and Schlogl in 2013, from 28 partial and complete fossilized teeth (holotype: Z 27485) discovered in the Laksarska Nova Ves Formation at Cerová-Lieskové, Vienna Basin, in Slovakia. It was placed incertae sedis into the chondrichthyan subclass Neoselachii. The authors expressed an uncertainty with regards to the validity of Nanocetorhinus being assigned to this subclass, as the teeth from which it was described bore minimal resemblance to those of previously known neoselachian taxa. They also noted other fossils from western Canada and France may represent this species.

In 2017, Pollerspöck and Straube reported 126 fossilized teeth of N. tuberculatus from Germany, and referred other fossils from Austria and Switzerland to N. tuberculatus. Two studies in 2019 have also reported the presence of this species in Japan.

In 2020, Feichtinger, Pollerspöck and Harzhauser named a second species N. zeitlingeri based on three complete fossilized teeth from the Kamig quarry in Austria. In 2022, Pollerspöck, Güthner and Straube reported the presence of N. tuberculatus from Austria based on a single tooth.

The generic name combines the Latin term "nano" ("dwarvish") with "Cetorhinus" (the generic name of the basking shark), and references the resemblance the teeth of Nanocetorhinus bear to those of Cetorhinus, but on a smaller scale. The species epithet of N. tuberculatus refers to the tuberculate surface ornament of the teeth, while N. zeitlingeri is named in honor of Franz Zeitlinger, the curator of the Kaolinum Mining Museum in Kriechbaum of Austria.

== Description ==
Underwood and Schlogl theorized that Nanocetorhinus was a planktivorous shark, similarly to its namesake, although there is no consequential evidence that the two genera are closely related. The teeth were little more than 1 mm long at the largest. The authors described the form of the teeth as "simple and rather irregular", and mentioned a lack of wear on the cutting edges, indicating that they were not used to grab and puncture meat, but rather played a minimal role in the process of food consumption. They also noted that the irregular form was more consistent with those of planktivorous sharks.
