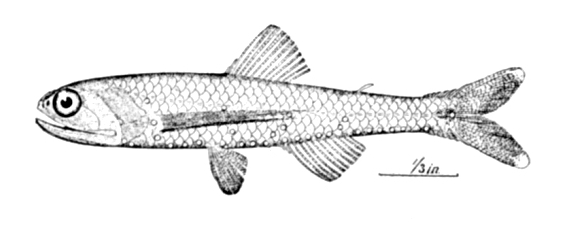
- A drawing of a Ledidophanes guentheri

Scientific classification
- Domain: Eukaryota
- Kingdom: Animalia
- Phylum: Chordata
- Class: Actinopterygii
- Order: Myctophiformes
- Family: Myctophidae
- Genus: Lepidophanes; Fraser-Brunner, 1949

= Lepidophanes =

Genus of fishes

Lepidophanes is a genus of lanternfishes found in the Atlantic Ocean.

== Species ==
There are currently two recognized species in this genus:

- Lepidophanes gaussi (A. B. Brauer, 1906)
- Lepidophanes guentheri (Goode & T. H. Bean, 1896)
