= Coccoderma =

Coccoderma Temporal range: Kimmeridgian to Tithonian
- Specimen of C. suevicum
- Skull diagram of C. suevicum

Scientific classification
- Kingdom: Animalia
- Phylum: Chordata
- Class: Actinistia
- Family: †Laugiidae
- Genus: †Coccoderma; Quenstdedt, 1858

Type species
- †Coccoderma suevicum Quenstdedt, 1858

Species
- See text

Synonyms
- †Kokkoderma Quenstedt, 1858 (original spelling)

Extinct genus of fishes

Coccoderma is an extinct genus of prehistoric marine coelacanth which lived during the Late Jurassic period. Fossils have been found in Germany and France. It was small in size, about 27.5 cm. They had very long and sharp teeth.

It was one of the earliest coelacanths to be properly studied by science. It lived far later than other members of its family (Laugiidae), which otherwise only existed during the Early Triassic, thus leaving an exceptional ghost lineage of over 100 million years. It was the last surviving member of the non-latimerioid coelacanths (e.g. coelacanths outside of Latimeriidae and Mawsoniidae).

== Species ==
- †C. bavaricum Reis, 1888 - Tithonian of Germany (Solnhofen Limestone)
- †C. gigas Reis, 1888 - Tithonian of Germany (Solhofen Limestone)
- †C. suevicum Quenstdedt, 1858 - Kimmeridgian (Nusplingen Limestone) and Tithonian (Solnhofen Limestone) of Germany (=Coelacanthus harlemensis Winkler, 1874, Coccoderma nudum Reis, 1888)

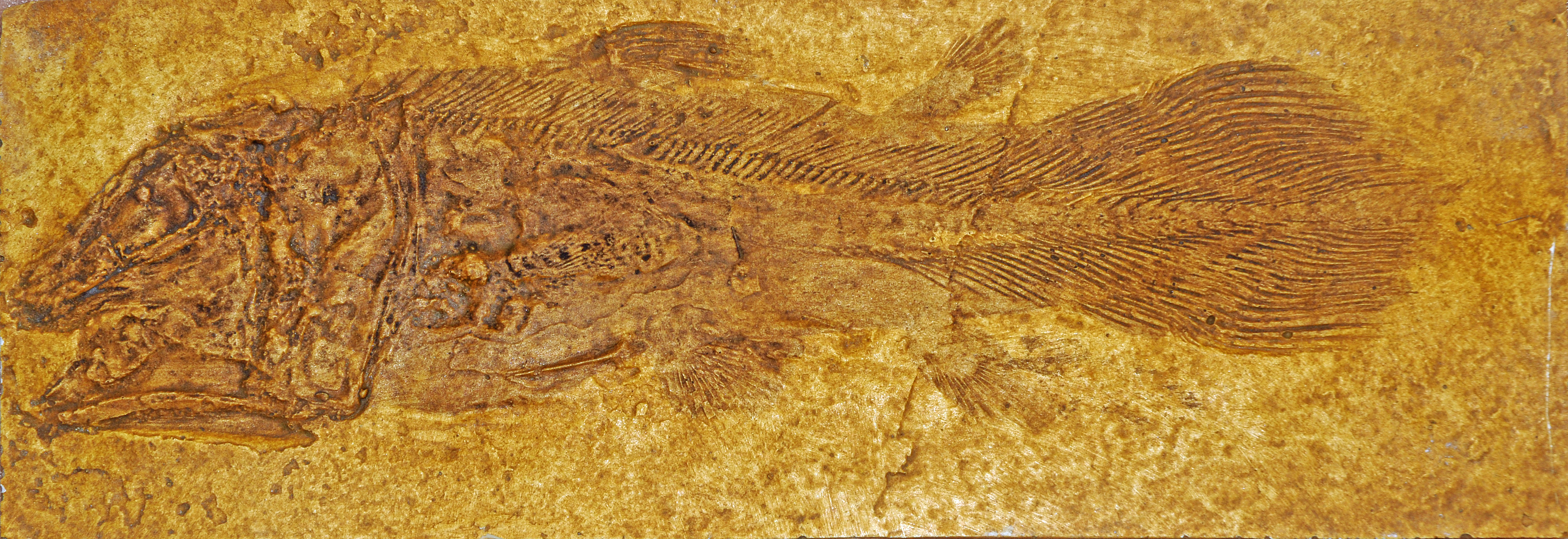
C. bavaricum

An indeterminate species is known from the Tithonian-aged Canjuers Lagerstätte of France, which was previously thought to be from the earliest Cretaceous (Berriasian). The species C. nudum likely represents an immature C. suevicum. The species C. bavaricum and C. gigas may not belong to this genus. The species C. substriolatum from England has been reclassified as a mawsoniid, and tentatively to Trachymetopon.
