= Chiloscyllium frequens =

Chiloscyllium frequens Temporal range: Late Cretaceous

Scientific classification
- Kingdom: Animalia
- Phylum: Chordata
- Class: Chondrichthyes
- Subclass: Elasmobranchii
- Division: Selachii
- Order: Orectolobiformes
- Family: Hemiscylliidae
- Genus: Chiloscyllium
- Species: †C. frequens

Binomial name
- †Chiloscyllium frequens Guinot et al., 2013

Extinct species of fish

Chiloscyllium frequens is an extinct species of Chiloscyllium that lived during the Santonian and Campanian stages of the Late Cretaceous epoch.

== Distribution ==
Chiloscyllium frequens is known from fossils found in France and the United Kingdom.
