= Oligopleurus =

Oligopleurus Temporal range: Kimmeridgian

Scientific classification
- Domain: Eukaryota
- Kingdom: Animalia
- Phylum: Chordata
- Class: Actinopterygii
- Genus: Oligopleurus; Thiollière, 1850

Extinct genus of fish

Oligopleurus is an extinct genus of prehistoric bony fish that lived during the Kimmeridgian stage of the Late Jurassic epoch.

== See also ==
- Prehistoric fish
- List of prehistoric bony fish
