= Paraetmopterus =

Scientific classification
- Domain: Eukaryota
- Kingdom: Animalia
- Phylum: Chordata
- Class: Chondrichthyes
- Subclass: Elasmobranchii
- Division: Selachii
- Order: Squaliformes
- Family: Etmopteridae
- Genus: †Paraetmopterus; Adnet, 2006

Extinct genus of sharks

Paraetmopterus is an extinct genus of sharks in the family Etmopteridae. It was described by Adnet in 2006, and the type species is P. nolfi, which existed during the middle Eocene of France. A new species, P. horvathi, which existed in what is now Slovakia during the Miocene epoch, was described by Charlie J. Underwood and Jan Schlögl in 2013; however, this species was subsequently transferred to the separate genus Palaeocentroscymnus.
