= Azores dogfish =

Conservation status
- Data Deficient (IUCN 3.1)

Scientific classification
- Kingdom: Animalia
- Phylum: Chordata
- Class: Chondrichthyes
- Subclass: Elasmobranchii
- Division: Selachii
- Order: Squaliformes
- Family: Somniosidae
- Genus: Scymnodalatias
- Species: S. garricki

Binomial name
- Scymnodalatias garricki Kukuev & Konovalenko, 1988
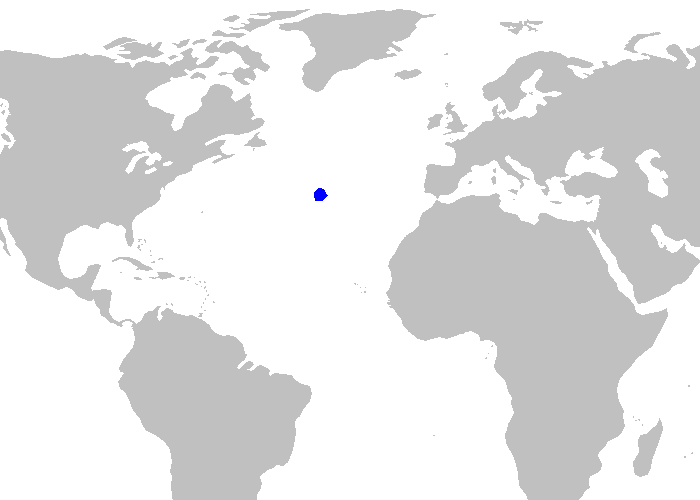
- Range of the Azores dogfish (in blue)

Species of shark

The Azores dogfish (Scymnodalatias garricki) is a very rare sleeper shark of the family Somniosidae. It is known only from the holotype caught north of the Azores and another caught in 2001.

The Azores dogfish lives in the northeastern Atlantic Ocean at depths of 300-2000m. Like most sharks, it is ovoviviparous.
