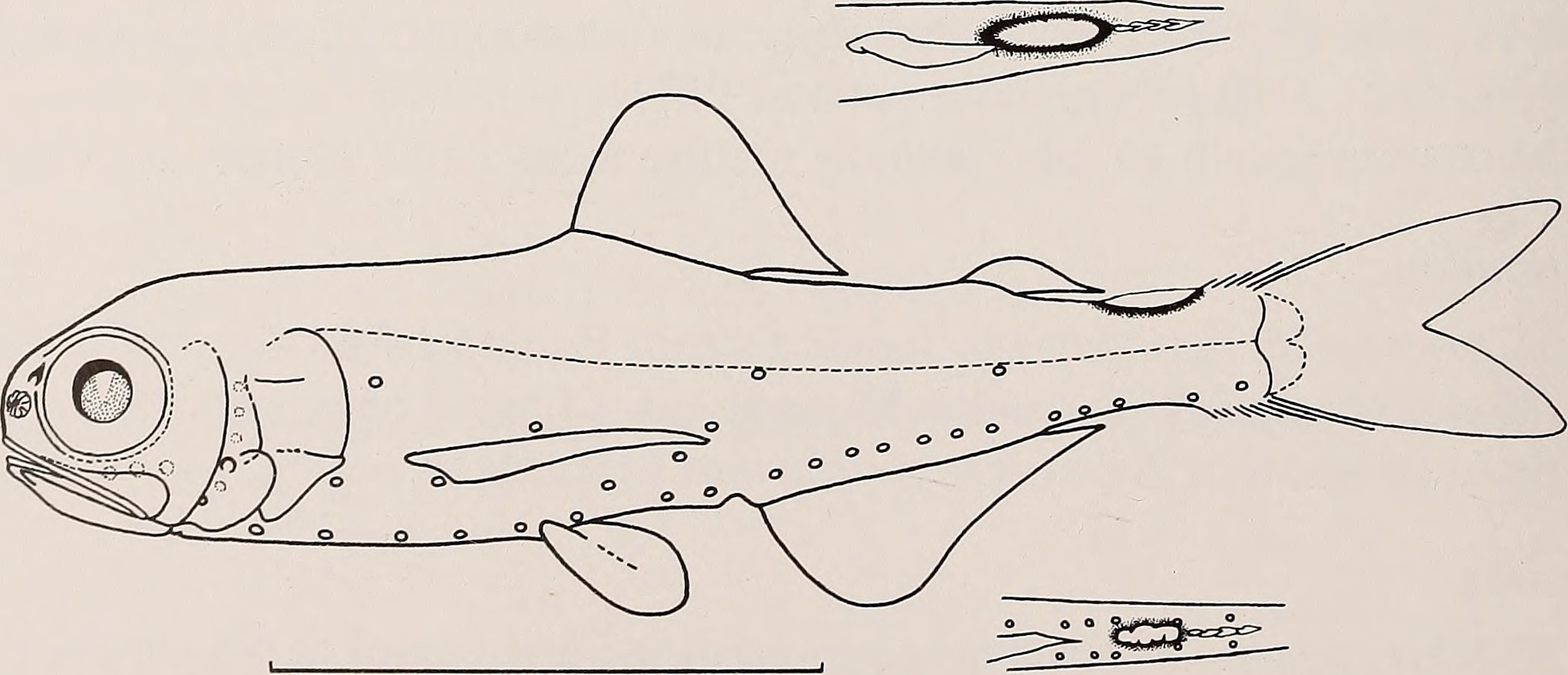
- Diogenichthys atlanticus

Scientific classification
- Domain: Eukaryota
- Kingdom: Animalia
- Phylum: Chordata
- Class: Actinopterygii
- Order: Myctophiformes
- Family: Myctophidae
- Genus: Diogenichthys; Bolin, 1939

= Diogenichthys =

Genus of fishes

Diogenichthys is a genus of lanternfishes.

== Species ==
There are currently three recognized species in this genus:

- Diogenichthys atlanticus (Tåning, 1928) (Longfin lanternfish)
- Diogenichthys laternatus (Garman, 1899) (Diogenes lanternfish)
- Diogenichthys panurgus Bolin, 1946
