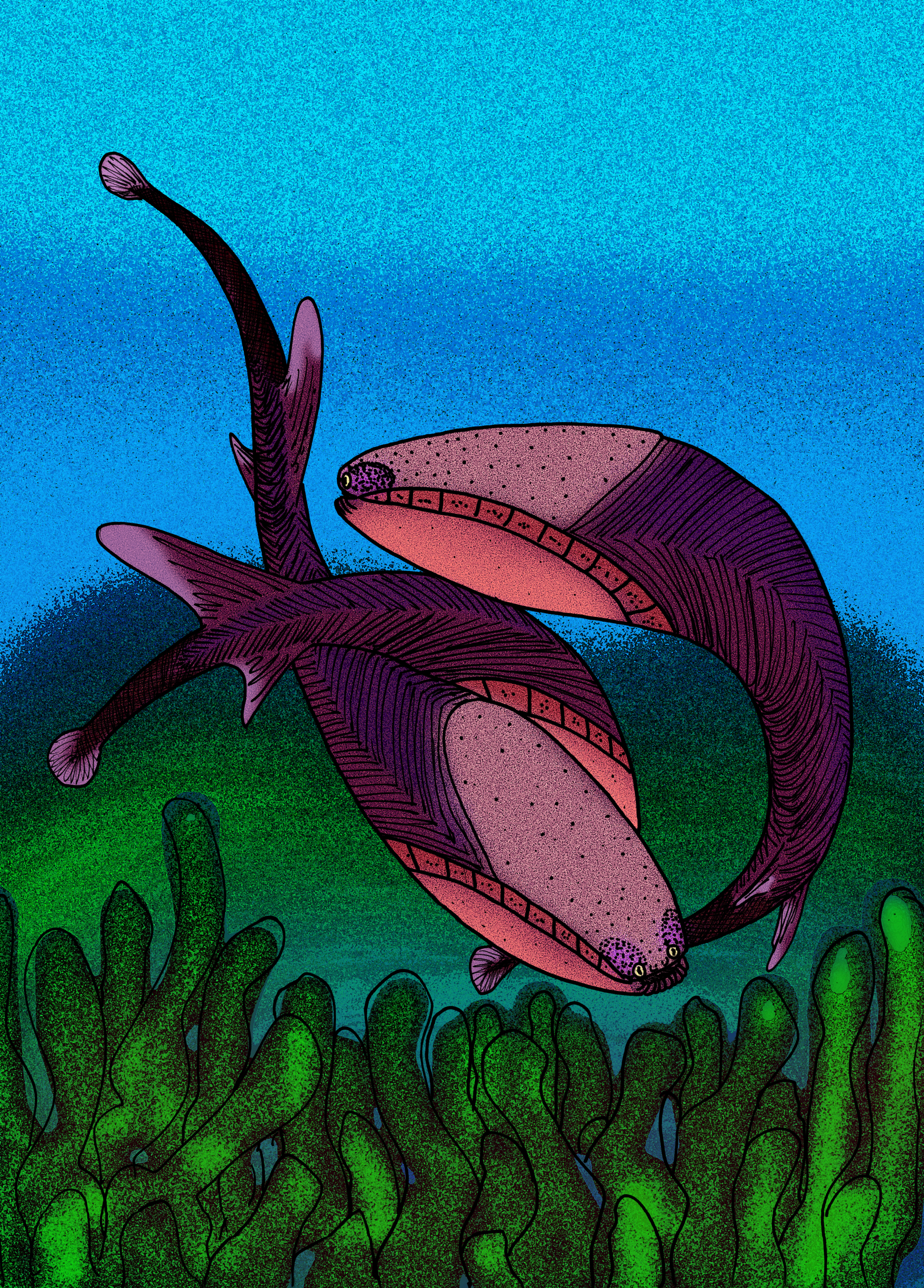
- Life restoration of Sacabambaspis

Scientific classification
- Kingdom: Animalia
- Phylum: Chordata
- Infraphylum: Agnatha
- Class: †Pteraspidomorpha
- Subclass: †Arandaspida; Ritchie and Gilbert-Tomlinson, 1977
- Order: †Arandaspidiformes; Ritchie and Gilbert-Tomlinson, 1977
- Family: †Arandaspididae; Ritchie and Gilbert-Tomlinson, 1977

= Arandaspida =

Arandaspida Temporal range: Early Ordovician – Late Ordovician, 477–445 Ma

Extinct subclass of jawless fishes

Arandaspida is a taxon of very early, jawless prehistoric fish which lived during the Ordovician period (Floian-Katian). Arandaspids represent some of the oldest known vertebrates. The group represents a subclass within the class Pteraspidomorphi, and contains only one order, the Arandaspidiformes. The oldest known genus of this group is Sacabambaspis found in South America.

== Characteristics ==
The head armor of arandaspids is elongated, fusiform, with a rather flat dorsal shield, and a bulging ventral shield. In the anterior part of the dorsal shield are two closely set holes, which have been thought to be a paired pineal opening, but which are more likely the external openings of the endolymphatic ducts.

The eyes, surrounded by a scleral ring, are housed in a notch at the anterior end of the dorsal shield. The nostrils are not clearly located, but may have been situated between the eyes. Ventrally, the ventral lip of the mouth is armed with long series of small oral plates which recall those of heterostracans.

The gill openings are probably numerous (more than 15) and minute. They opened between the diamond-shaped platelets which separate the dorsal from the ventral shield.

The body is covered with rod-shaped scales arranged in chevrons, and the tail is probably pad-shaped and diphycercal. The dermal bones of arandaspids consist of aspidine (acellular bone) and are ornamented with oakleaf-shaped tubercles which seem to contain no dentine. The sensory-lines were housed in narrow grooves between the tubercles.

== Taxonomy ==
Taxonomy based on the work of Mikko's Phylogeny Archive, Nelson, Grande and Wilson 2016 and van der Laan 2018.

- Order †Arandaspidiformes Ritchie & Gilbert-Tomlinson, 1977
  - Family †Arandaspididae Ritchie & Gilbert-Tomlinson, 1977 [Porophoraspididae Halstead 1993; Sacabambaspidae]
    - Genus †Andinaspis Gagnier, 1991 non Ritchie & Gilbert-Tomlinson, 1977
    - Genus †Apedolepis Young, 1997
    - Genus †Arandaspis Ritchie & Gilbert-Tomlinson, 1977
    - Genus †Areyongalepis Young, 2000
    - Genus †Pircanchaspis Erdtmann et al., 2000
    - Genus †Porophoraspis Ritchie & Gilbert-Tomlinson, 1977
    - Genus †Ritchieichthys Sansom et al., 2013
    - Genus †Sacabambaspis Gagnier, Blieck & Rodrico, 1986

== See also ==
- Astraspida
- Heterostraci
