= Callorhinchus torresi =

Callorhinchus torresi Temporal range: Maastrichtian

Scientific classification
- Kingdom: Animalia
- Phylum: Chordata
- Class: Chondrichthyes
- Subclass: Holocephali
- Order: Chimaeriformes
- Family: Callorhinchidae
- Genus: Callorhinchus
- Species: †C. torresi

Binomial name
- †Callorhinchus torresi Otero et al., 2013

Extinct species of cartilaginous fish

Callorhinchus torresi is an extinct species of Callorhinchus that lived during the Maastrichtian stage of the Cretaceous period.

== Distribution ==
Callorhinchus torresi is known from the López de Bertodano Formation of Seymour Island, Antarctica.
