= Belemnocerca =

Belemnocerca Temporal range: Early Triassic

Scientific classification
- Kingdom: Animalia
- Phylum: Chordata
- Class: Actinistia
- Order: Coelacanthiformes
- Family: †Laugiidae
- Genus: †Belemnocerca
- Species: †B. prolata

Binomial name
- †Belemnocerca prolata Wendruff & Wilson, 2013

Extinct genus of laugiid

Belemnocerca is an extinct genus of laugiid that lived during the Early Triassic epoch.

== Distribution ==
Belemnocerca prolata is known from the Sulphur Mountain Formation of Canada.
