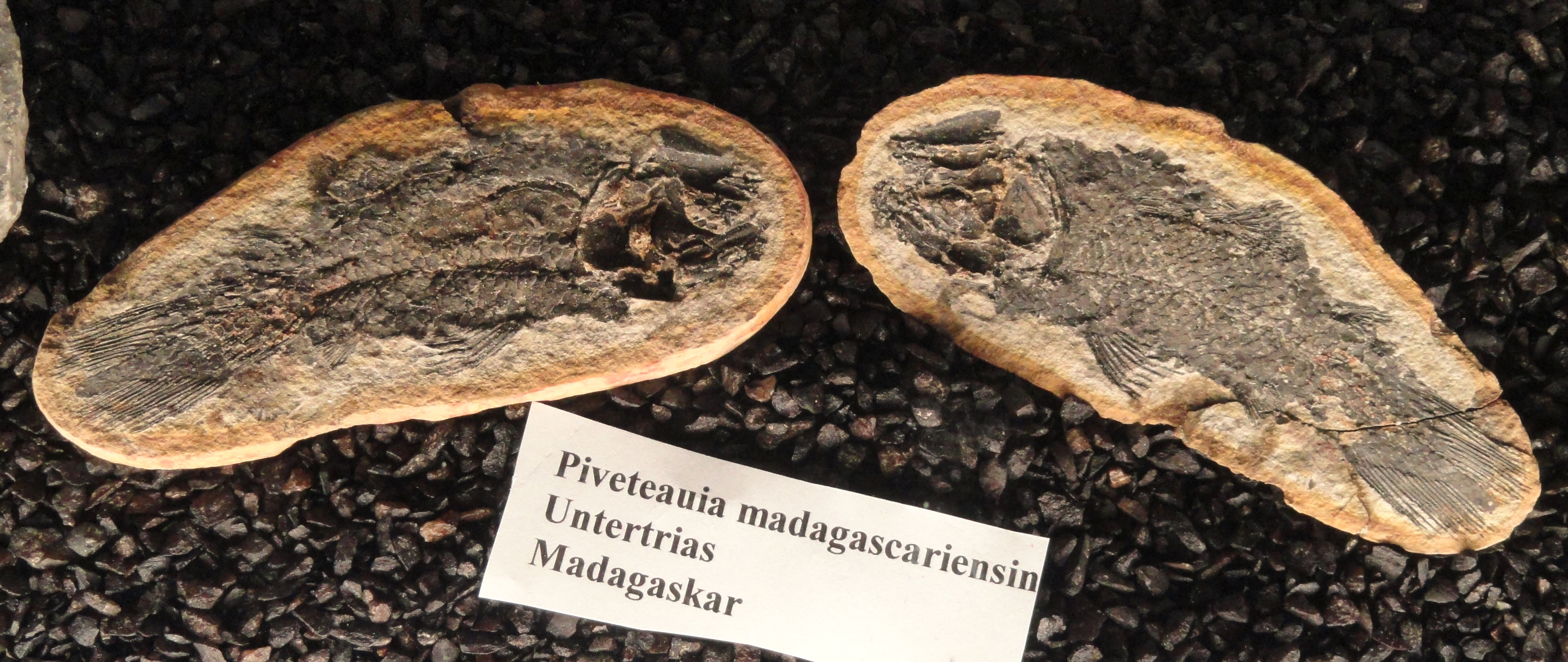
- Piveteauia madagascariensis fossil
- Skull diagram

Scientific classification
- Kingdom: Animalia
- Phylum: Chordata
- Class: Actinistia
- Order: Coelacanthiformes
- Family: †Whiteiidae
- Genus: †Piveteauia; Lehman, 1952

Type species
- †Piveteauia madagascariensis Lehman, 1952

= Piveteauia =

Piveteauia Temporal range: Induan

Extinct genus of coelacanths

Piveteauia is an extinct genus of prehistoric coelacanth fish which lived during the Lower Triassic period. The type specimen was discovered in the Middle Sakamena Group in northwestern Madagascar by French paleoichthyologist Jean-Pierre Lehman. The genus is named after Jean Piveteau.
