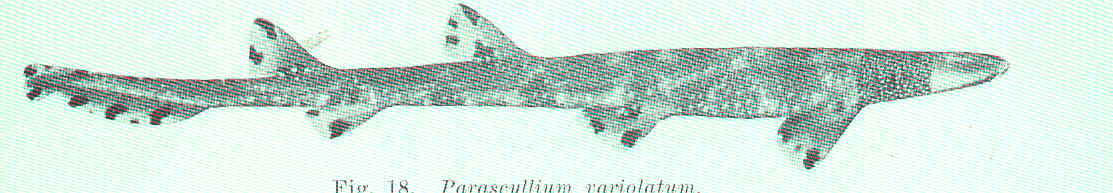

Scientific classification
- Kingdom: Animalia
- Phylum: Chordata
- Class: Chondrichthyes
- Subclass: Elasmobranchii
- Division: Selachii
- Order: Orectolobiformes
- Family: Parascylliidae; T. N. Gill, 1862

Genera
- Cirrhoscyllium; Parascyllium †Pararhincodon

= Parascylliidae =

Parascylliidae Temporal range: Albian–present

Family of fishes

Parascylliidae, or the collared carpet sharks, is a family of sharks in the order Orectolobiformes, which are only found in shallow waters of the western Pacific. The family Parascylliidae contains two genera, Cirrhoscyllium and Parascyllium. They are relatively small sharks, with the largest species reaching no more than 91.0 cm in adult length. They have elongated, slender bodies, cat-like eyes, and barbels behind their chins. They feed on small fish and invertebrates.

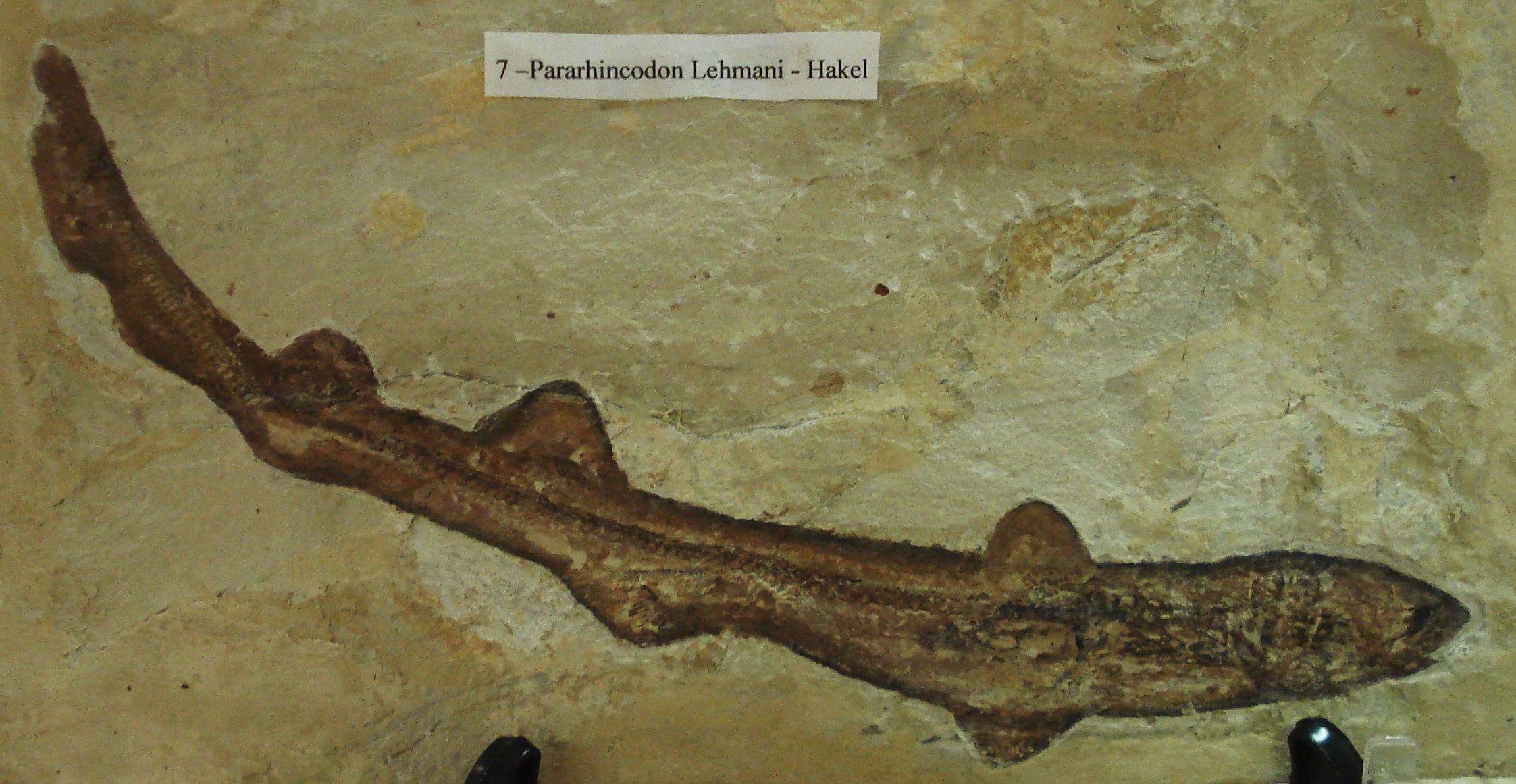
Fossil specimen of Pararhincodon from Lebanon

The oldest known member of the group is the stem group-parascyllid †Pararhincodon Herman in Cappetta, 1976, which is known from the Albian to the Lutetian. Although known primarily from teeth, two taxa (P. lehmani and P. torquis) are known from articulated remains, with the remains of P. torquis, described in 2025, providing conclusive evidence for classifying the previously-enigmatic genus within the Parascyllidae.

== See also ==
- List of sharks
