= Cook =

Cook or The Cook may refer to:

== Food preparation ==
- Cooking, the preparation of food
- Cook (domestic worker), a household staff member who prepares food
- Cook (profession), an individual who prepares food for consumption in the food industry
- Chef, a professional proficient in all aspects of food preparation

== Geography ==
=== U.S. ===
- Cook, Minnesota, a city
- Cook, Nebraska, a village
- Cook, Ohio, an unincorporated community
- Cook Hollow, Oregon County, Missouri
- Cook Inlet, off the Gulf of Alaska

=== Australia ===
- Cook, South Australia
- Cook County, New South Wales
- Cook, Australian Capital Territory
- Division of Cook, an Australian House of Representatives electoral district
- Electoral district of Cook, a Queensland Legislative Assembly electoral district
- Shire of Cook, in the far north of Queensland

=== Elsewhere ===
- Cook Peninsula, Nunavut, Canada
- Cook Strait, the strait separating the North and South Islands of New Zealand

== Companies ==
- Cook Group, an American manufacturer of medical devices
- Cook Records, an American record label
- Cook Trading, a UK manufacturer and retailer of frozen ready meals
- Thomas Cook Group, a defunct British travel company

== Film ==
- The Cook, a 1917 animated Krazy Kat film
- The Cook (1918 film), an American comedy film by Fatty Arbuckle, with Buster Keaton
- The Cook (1965 film), a Soviet comedy film

== Other ==
- Cook (crater), a crater on Earth's Moon
- Cook (dog) (2000–2016), a Spanish dog actor
- Cook (surname)
- Cook codec, a lossy audio compression codec developed by RealNetworks
- USS Cook, two ships of the U.S. Navy
- The Cook (Arcimboldo), a c. 1570 painting by Giuseppe Arcimboldo
- An unintended solution in chess problems; see Glossary of chess problems

== See also ==
- "La Cuisinière" (lit. "The Cook"), a 1930 song by Mary Bolduc
- Cooke (disambiguation)
- Cooked (disambiguation)
- Cooks (disambiguation)
- Cook County (disambiguation)
- Cook Glacier (disambiguation)
- Cook Hill (disambiguation)
- Cook Island (disambiguation)
- Cook Islands (disambiguation)
- Cook River (disambiguation)
- Cook Township (disambiguation)
