= Cook Island =

Cook Island may refer to:

- Cook Island, Kiritimati, Kiribati
- Cook Island (New South Wales), Australia
  - Cook Island Aquatic Reserve, New South Wales
  - Cook Island Nature Reserve, New South Wales
- Cook Island, South Sandwich Islands, Southern Thule
- "Cook Island" is the adjectival demonym for people and things from the Cook Islands
- Cook Island, Tierra del Fuego, Chile

== See also ==
- Cook Islands, self-governing democracy in the Pacific in free association with New Zealand
- Cook (disambiguation)
