= Kingsthorpe =

Suburb in Northampton, England

Coordinates: 52°15′45″N 0°54′0″W

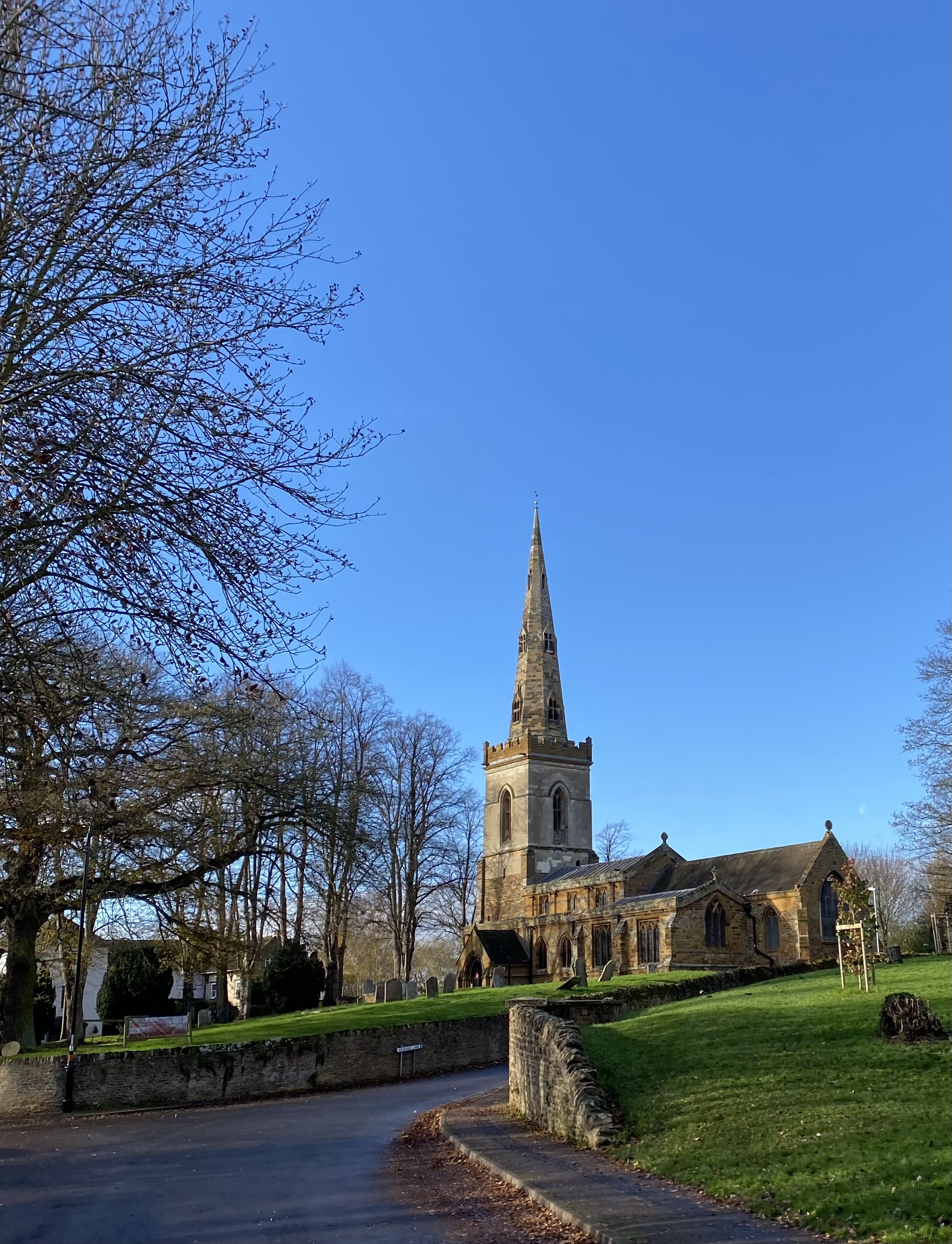
- St John the Baptist church from the village green

- Location within Northamptonshire
- Population: 4,477 (Ward, 2011)
- OS grid reference: SP7463
  - London: 70 miles (113 km)
- Civil parish: Kingsthorpe
- Unitary authority: West Northamptonshire
- Ceremonial county: Northamptonshire
- Region: East Midlands
- Country: England
- Sovereign state: United Kingdom
- Post town: Northampton
- Postcode district: NN2
- Dialling code: 01604
- Police: Northamptonshire
- Fire: Northamptonshire
- Ambulance: East Midlands
- UK Parliament: Northampton North

Kingsthorpe is a suburb and civil parish of Northampton, in the West Northamptonshire district, in the ceremonial county of Northamptonshire, England. It is situated to the north of Northampton town centre and is served by the A508 and A5199 roads which join at Kingsthorpe's centre. The 2011 Census recorded the population of the district council ward as 4,477.

For centuries, Kingsthorpe was a rural village, with a parish of 1,020 acres (410 ha) and history dating back to the 9th century. In the 19th century, it was made a civil parish. Most of the parish was absorbed into the borough of Northampton in 1900; the remainder of it followed in 1931. Kingsthorpe continued to grow into the 20th century as residential development moved further northwards and either side of the A508 and A5199 roads.

Kingsthorpe is now a large residential area of Northampton which is made up of several neighbourhoods that surround its central shopping front. In 2020, Kingsthorpe Parish Council was formed.

== Geography ==
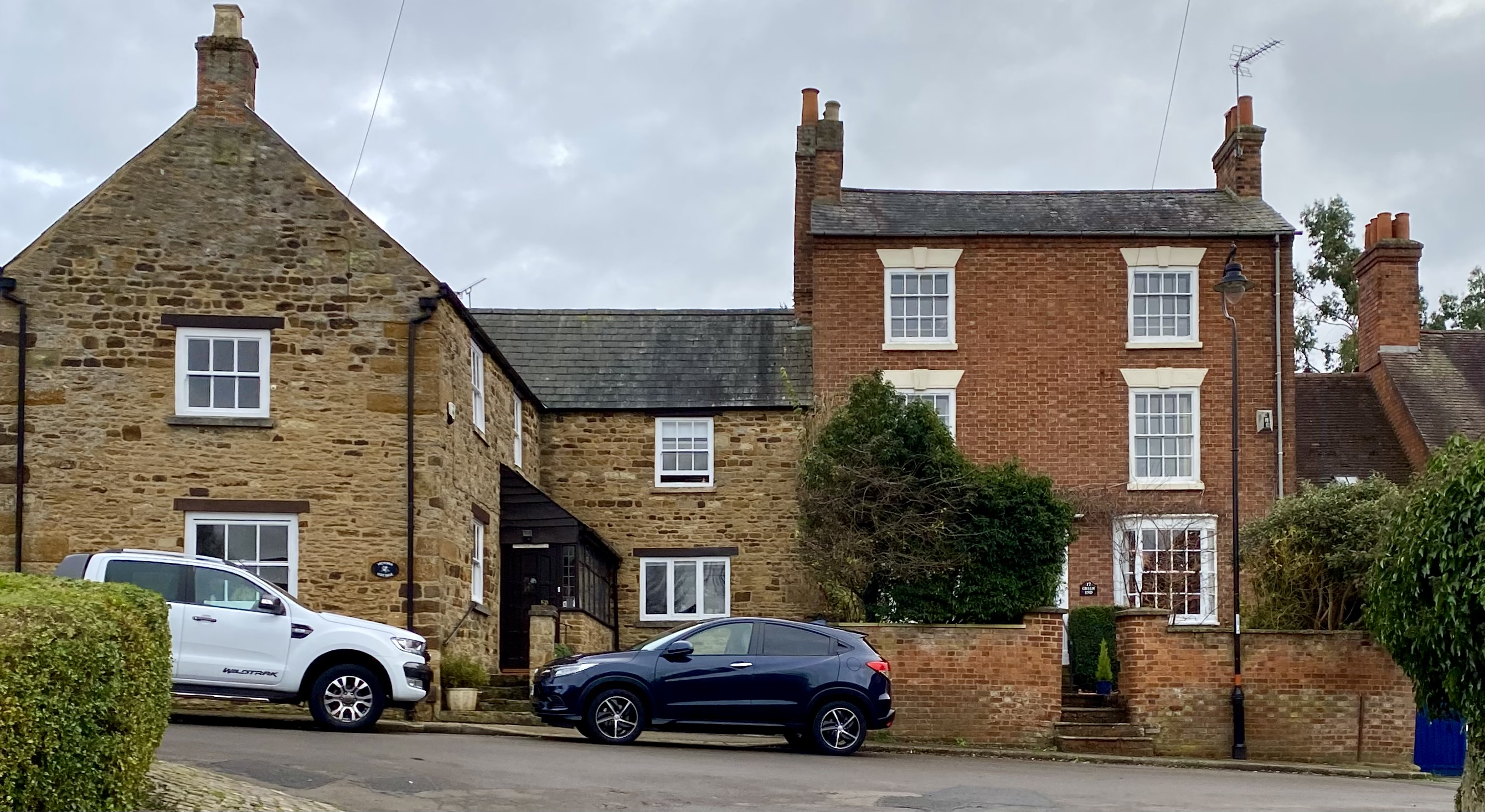
A street scene in the village

Kingsthorpe lies approximately two miles north of Northampton town centre as well as being placed to the west of Abington, to the east of Duston and to the south of Boughton. It is situated on sloping land overlooking the tributary of the River Nene called the Naseby Source, or Brampton Nene, which flows through the area to the west from north to south.

The original village retains a semi-rural character, away from the main roads, overlooked by the parish church and vernacular cottages. The suburb's amenities are centred on the main A508 and A5199 roads that link central Northampton with Market Harborough and Leicester respectively.

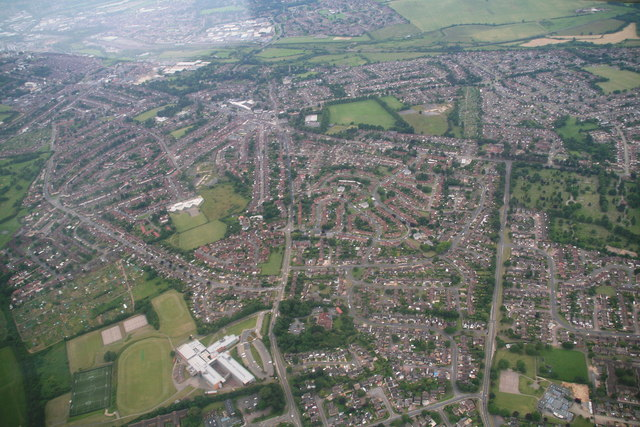
Aerial view of Kingsthorpe in 2014

Areas considered part of Kingsthorpe have since grown around the original village, with residential development mainly to the north and either side of the A508 and A5199 roads. The parish of Kingsthorpe covers a large area split into 5 wards: Kingsthorpe, Obelisk, St Davids, Spring Park and Sunnyside.

== History ==
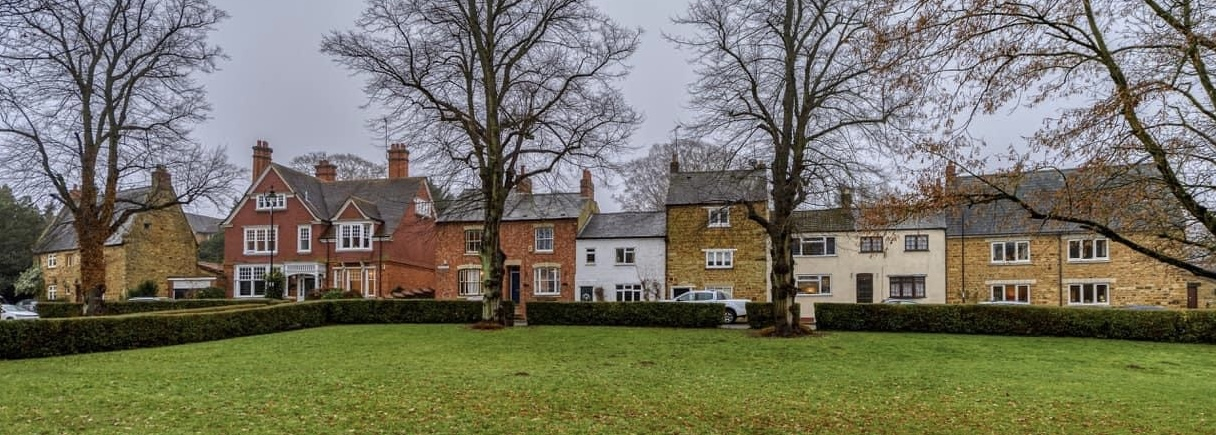
Houses surrounding the village green

Kingsthorpe was listed in the Domesday Book in 1085 as Torp; at this time it formed part of the demesne of the Crown. This evolved into Thorp during the 12th and 13th centuries. By the 14th century, it was known as Kyngesthorpe. The name is derived from the Old English cyning and Old Danish torp, meaning the King's hamlet or farmstead.

The Domesday Book also made reference to three watermills, which were later known as North (or Farre) Mill (being furthest from the village), the Nether Mill in the village, and the South Mill nearer to Northampton. Milling in Kingsthorpe continued into the 20th century, when all the mills were demolished.

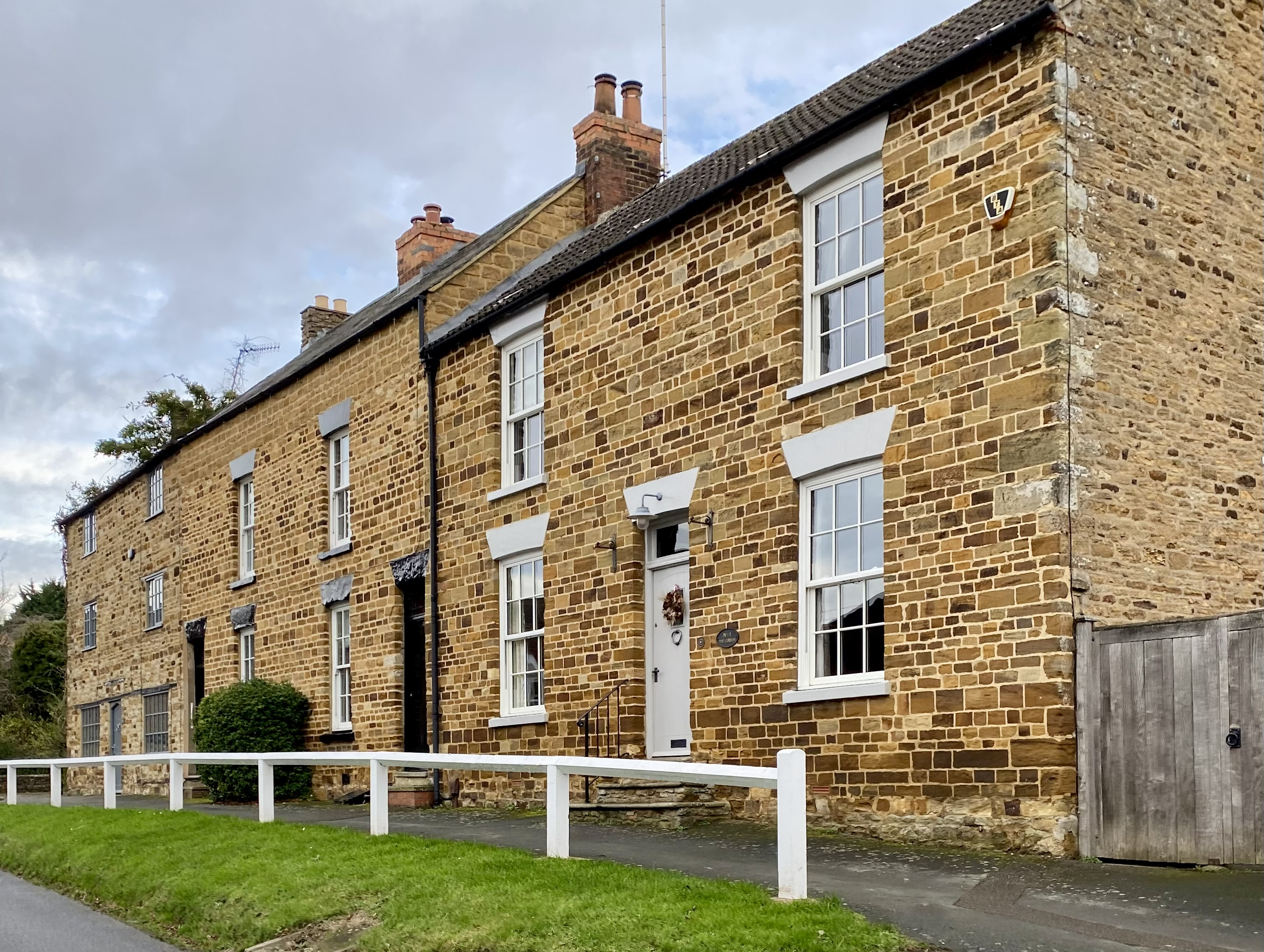
A row of stone houses in the village

The historic core of the village is centred on the village green and the 12th-century Church of St John the Baptist. The original parish of Kingsthorpe was large and extended to approximately 1743 acres in 1767, incorporating areas that would now be considered neighbourhoods of present-day Kingsthorpe, as well as parts of Abington and Kingsley to the east, and parts of the Queen's Park and Semilong estates to the south.

Some of the oldest buildings in the village, which date back to the 17th century, include Kingswell Cottage on The Green; stone cottages in Well Yard; and the Home Farm farmhouse, Dovecote and Barn on Kingswell Road.

The Queen Adelaide public house on Manor Road dates back to the 18th century, while the Cock Hotel public house on the Harborough Road dates back to 1893. The present Cock Hotel building replaced an older coaching inn which dated back to the 16th century. Opposite the Cock sits the Kingsthorpe War Memorial dating back to 1921.

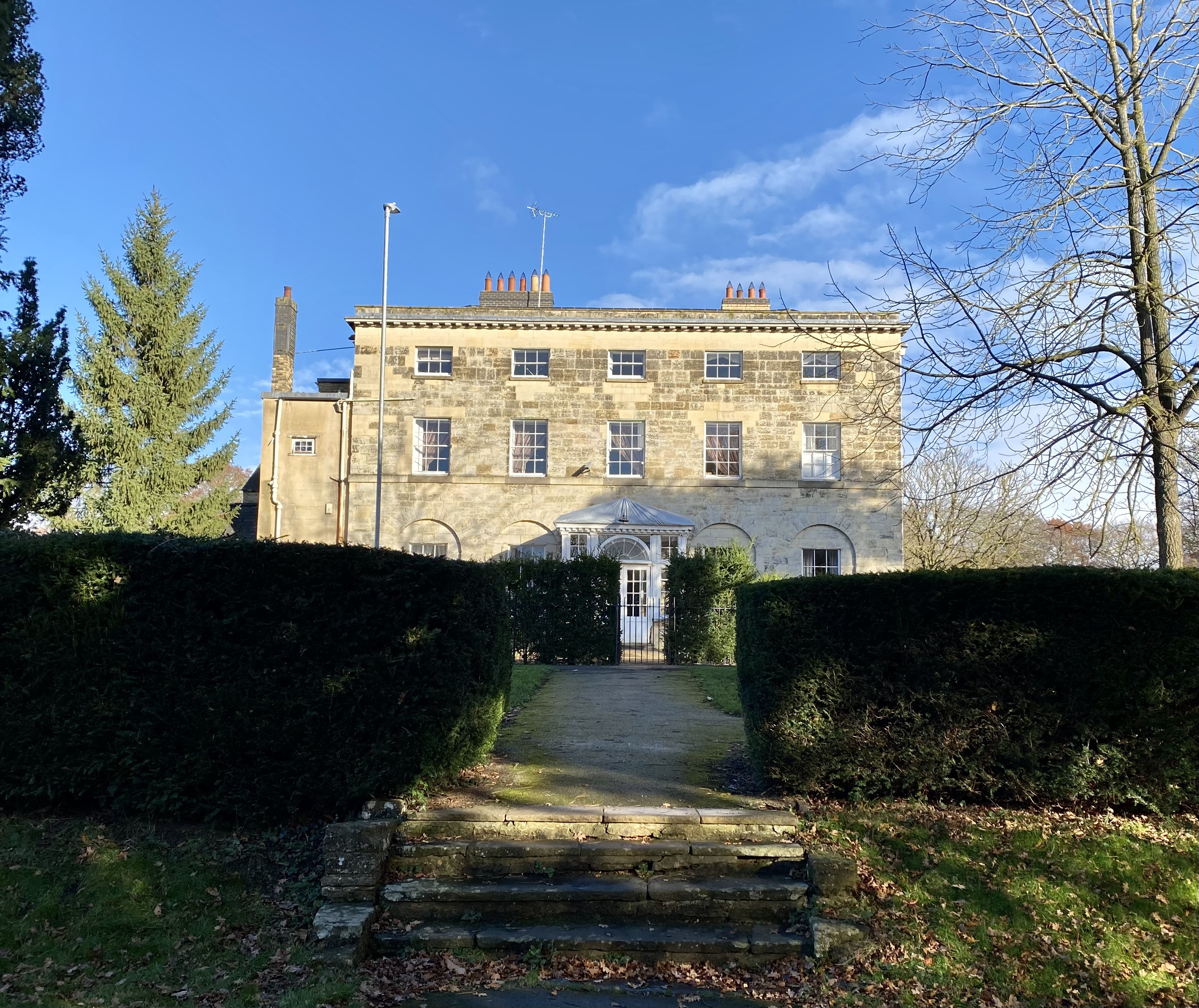
Kingsthorpe Hall was built c. 1775

Kingsthorpe Hall (formerly Thornton Hall) was built circa 1775. The hall and surrounding parkland was sold to the local council in 1937. Thornton Park is now a popular public park. The stables of the former hall also date back to the 18th century; both the stables and hall have since been converted into private residences.

In 1835, the Kingsthorpe Baptist Chapel opened on the High Street. The Catholic Church of St Aidan on Manor Road opened in 1964.

The Dallington Iron Ore Co Ltd briefly quarried iron ore north of the village. The quarry was between what is now the A5199 and the then railway to Market Harborough (now disused). The quarry operated from 1859 to 1861 or slightly longer. The ore was taken away by rail. The site of the quarry is now covered by housing.

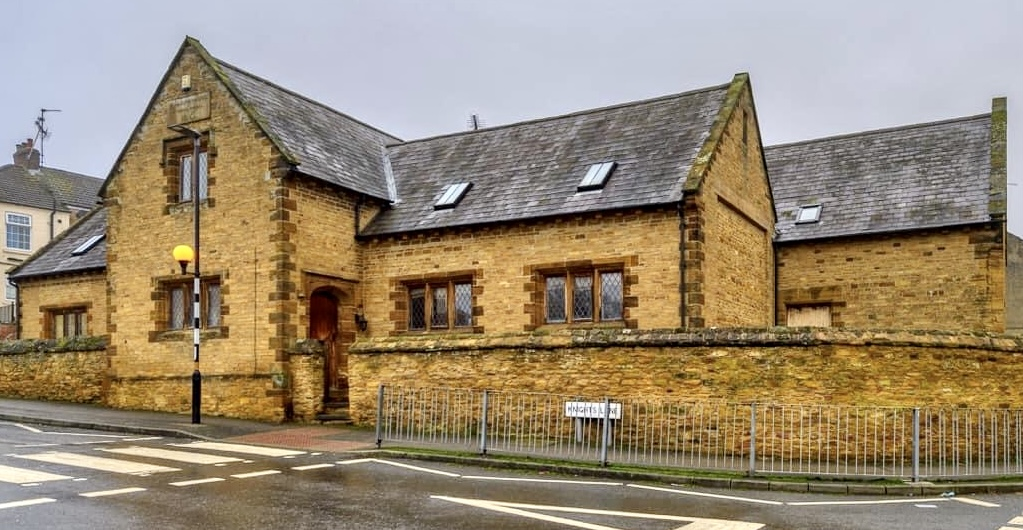
The old Kingsthorpe National School was built in 1840

Kingsthorpe had provisions for education during the 17th century; the first recorded school building was on the corner of the High Street where it meets The Rise. The building was rebuilt in 1870. The old Kingsthorpe National School on the junction of High Street and Knights Lane was established in 1840. Both buildings have since been converted in private residences. By 1905, Kingsthorpe Grove School was established; the red brick building and its moulded terracotta dressings is listed.

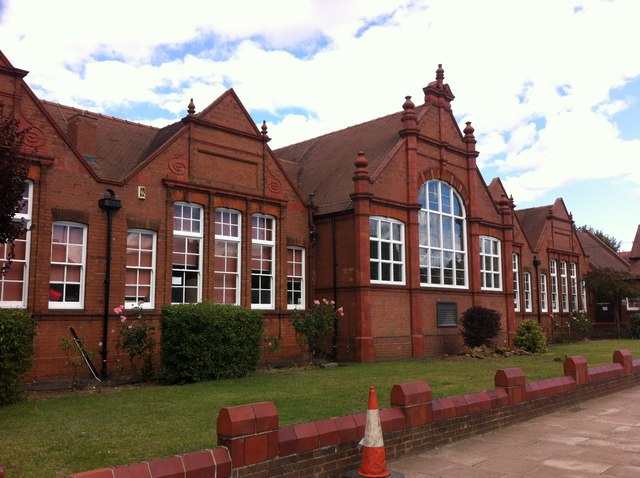
Kingsthorpe Grove Primary School in 2013

In 1882, the current St Davids Hospital was constructed on the site of the original hospital founded in 1200. The building was later used as a school and is now a rehabilitation care home for adults with brain injuries.

In 1891, a hospital was erected on the western side of Harborough Road used to treat infectious diseases. Just opposite, the Kingsthorpe Cemetery opened in 1898 on the eastern side of the road, where it has remained and enlarged since. The cemetery contains War graves of Commonwealth service personnel (41 from World War I and 72 from World War II, as well as three Czech servicemen from the latter war. In 1899, a second hospital to treat infectious diseases was erected at the northern end of the Welford Road.

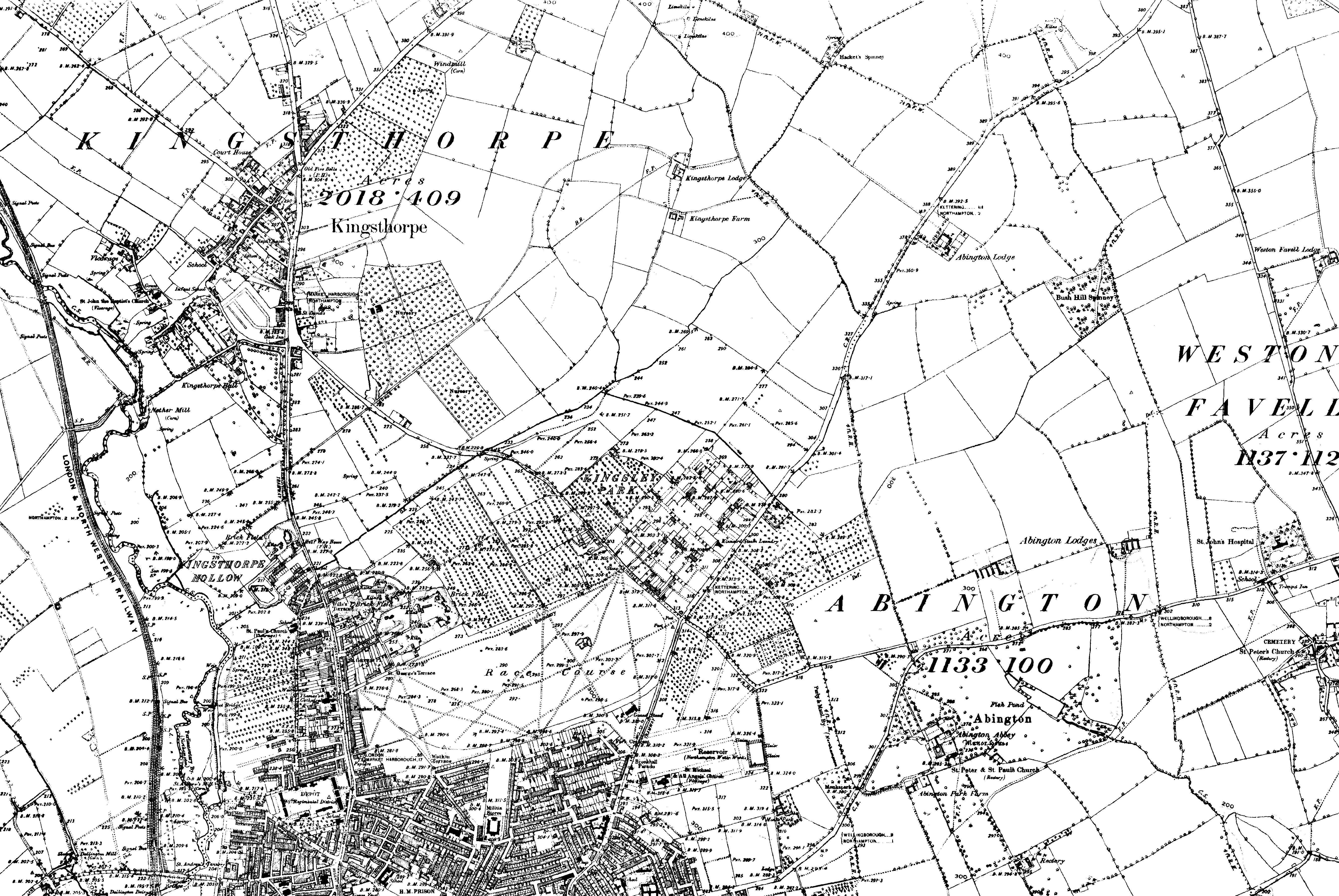
19th century map of Kingsthorpe

In 1900, the village was incorporated into the County Borough administrative area. In 1912, the local council acquired 21 acres on the east of the Welford Road from the Thornton estate, which later became the Recreation Ground (or 'The Rec' for short) where there were facilities for cricket, football, tennis and bowls as well as a children's playground.

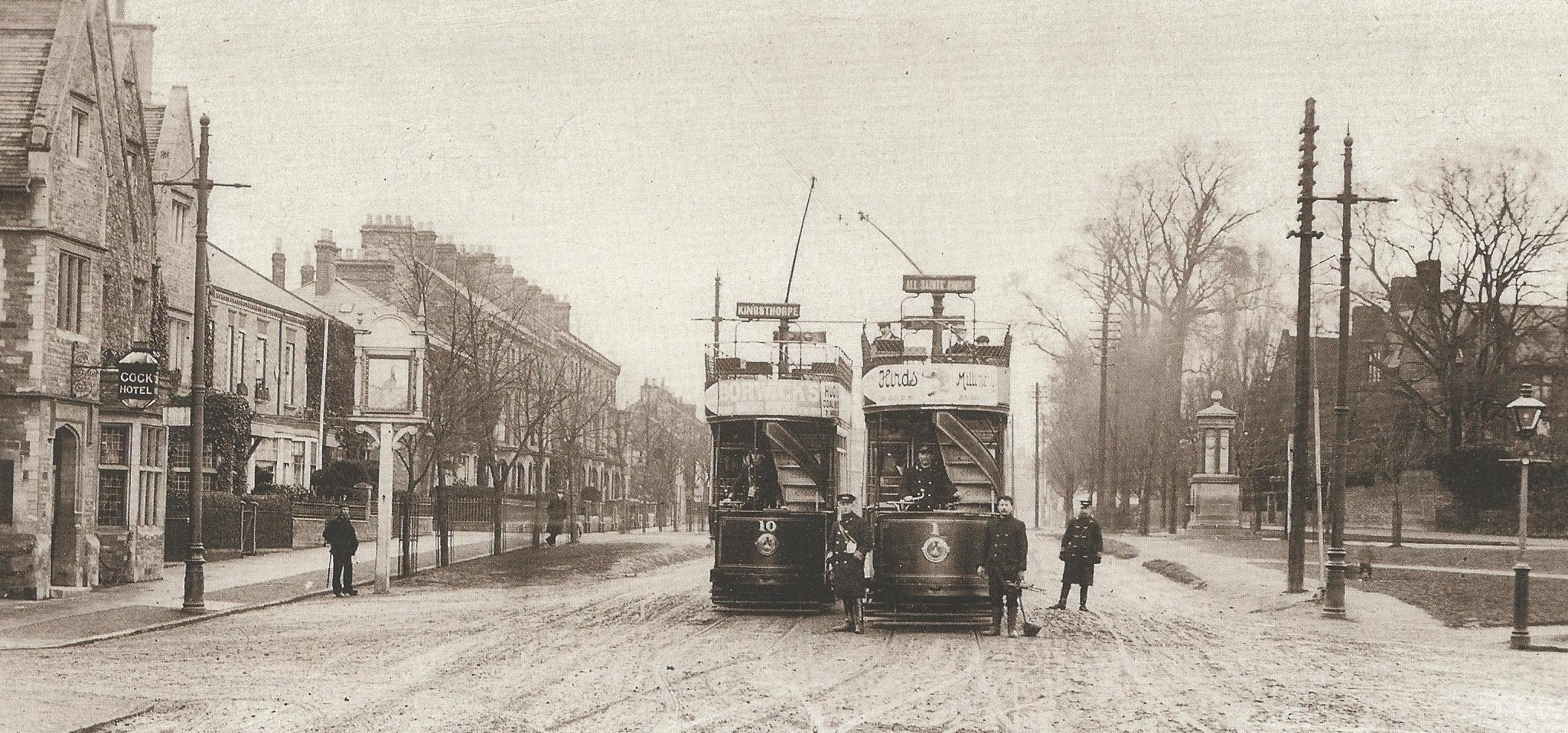
Northampton Corporation trams in Kingsthorpe in about 1905

A Northampton Corporation Tramways route served Kingsthorpe until the network was closed at the end of 1934.

By the 1930s, there was a parade of shops on the Harborough Road, known as Alexandra Terrace, with the Bective shoe and boot factory on the other side of the road. There were also facilities for croquet and tennis at the junction of the A508 and A5199 roads. Housing development had been completed in Kingswell Road, Washington Street, Lincoln Street and Garfield Street. There were also dwellings in Bective Road, Newington Road and parts of Yelvertoft and Norton Roads. Houses had been built on the south side of Boughton Green Road and Ruskin Road had been developed as well as the beginning of St Davids estate to the west of Eastern Avenue.

In the early part of the 20th century, more housing was also built along the west side of Welford Road as well as on parts of North Western Avenue, Foxgrove Avenue and Kingsway. On the Harborough Road, Glan-y-mor Terrace had been built. Further along, opposite the Cemetery, the White Hills estate had started to be built. During the second half of the 20th century, housing estates and some industrial developments filled the remaining portions of land within the boundaries of the old parish. In the 1960s, the Chalcombe Avenue and Hinton Road estates were built.

Between the late 1960s and 1970s, the Spring Park estate (which includes Acre Lane, Rookery Lane and Sherwood Avenue) was developed in the west, followed in the east by Obelisk estate, which ushered in the construction of Holly Lodge Drive.

In 1972, the College of Education was opened by Margaret Thatcher. The college, located off the Boughton Green Road, later became the main campus for the University of Northampton, before it moved to its new town centre campus in 2018. The old campus was demolished for new housing. In 1974, the Kingsthorpe Shopping Centre opened. It included shops, a post office, a pub and a Waitrose supermarket. In the early 2000s, alterations were made to demolish part of the centre to extend Waitrose and its car park. In 2021, a coffee shop opened and Waitrose completed a refurbishment. A second supermarket was built 1986; it operated as Safeway for a number of years but is now an Asda supermarket. In 2023, a COOK shop opened next to Waitrose.

Newer housing developments, including Tollgate Close, Brampton Park and Cedrus Court, were also completed by the 1980s. Residential development has continued into the 21st century: Bective Close, Lime Tree Gardens and Scholars Court were built on former brownfield land. Buckton Fields, a large new housing estate built land directly to the north of the border of the Kingsthorpe parish, is still in development.

== Parish church ==
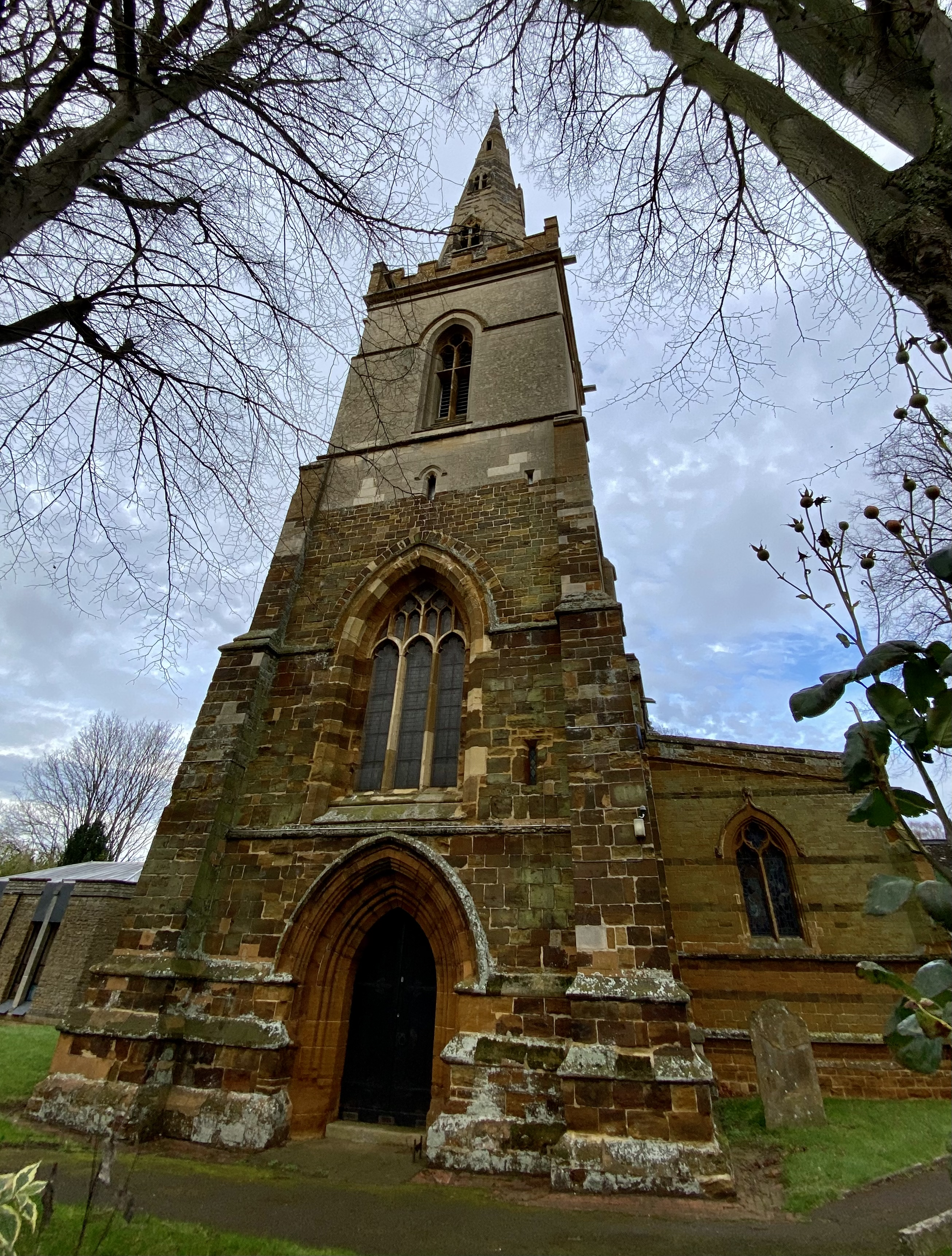
Church of St John the Baptist in the village

The Church of England parish church of St John the Baptist was built in the 11th century and still has remains of some original late Anglo-Saxon or early Norman windows. It is a Grade I listed building.

The north chapel and north and south aisles were added about 1170–80. The church had a south chapel by about 1180. Part of the chancel was built in about 1220. In the 14th century the crypt was built, the chapels were extended eastward and most of the current windows were inserted.

The west tower and recessed spire are 14th- or 15th-century. The tower has a ring of six bells. Robert Atton of Buckingham cast the second bell in 1621 and the fifth bell in 1622. Henry I Bagley of Chacombe cast the tenor bell in 1671 and Henry II Bagley cast the third bell in 1680. Alfred Bowell of Ipswich, Suffolk cast the treble and fourth bells in 1911.

The pulpit is Jacobean. There is a monument to Edward Reynolds, who died in 1698.

The church was restored in 1863 under the direction of the architect William Slater.

When Bishop of Peterborough, William Connor Magee circulated questions to the clergy of the Rural Deanery of Northampton in preparation for formal visitations held in the years 1872, 1875, 1878, 1882 and 1888. These and the answers provided have been published, including a detailed introduction describing the condition of the town at that time and associated issues. Kingsthorpe is one of the parishes included.

== Notable people associated with Kingsthorpe ==
- Joan Hickson, who played Miss Marple in the Miss Marple BBC television series, was born in the village.
- Actress Judy Carne's parents were greengrocers in the village.
- Violet Gibson, attempted assassin of Benito Mussolini, is buried at Kingsthorpe Cemetery.
- Lesley Joseph, who played Dorien Green in the television comedy series Birds of a Feather, was raised here until the age of 18.
- Lucia Joyce, dancer daughter of Irish writer James Joyce, is buried at Kingsthorpe Cemetery.
- Tom Walls, actor, director and producer, best known for the Aldwych Farces.

== See also ==
- Kingsthorpe College

== Bibliography ==
- Mills, AD (1991). A Dictionary of British Place-Names. Oxford: Oxford University Press. ISBN 0-19-869156-4.
- Pevsner, Nikolaus; Cherry, Bridget (revision) (1973) [1961]. Northamptonshire. The Buildings of England (2nd ed.). Harmondsworth: Penguin Books. pp. 339–341. ISBN 0-14-071022-1.
- RCHME, ed. (1985). "Kingsthorpe". An Inventory of the Historical Monuments in the County of Northamptonshire. Vol. 5 – Archaeology and churches in Northampton. London: Royal Commission on the Historical Monuments of England. pp. 300–310.
- Salzman, LF, ed. (1937). A History of the County of Northampton. Victoria County History. Vol. IV. London: Oxford University Press for the Institute of Historical Research. pp. 81–88.
- Tonks, Eric (April 1989). The Ironstone Quarries of the Midlands Part 3: The Northampton Area. Cheltenham: Runpast Publishing. p. 151–152. ISBN 1-870-754-034.
