= Cook Island Aquatic Reserve =

Marine protected area in Australia

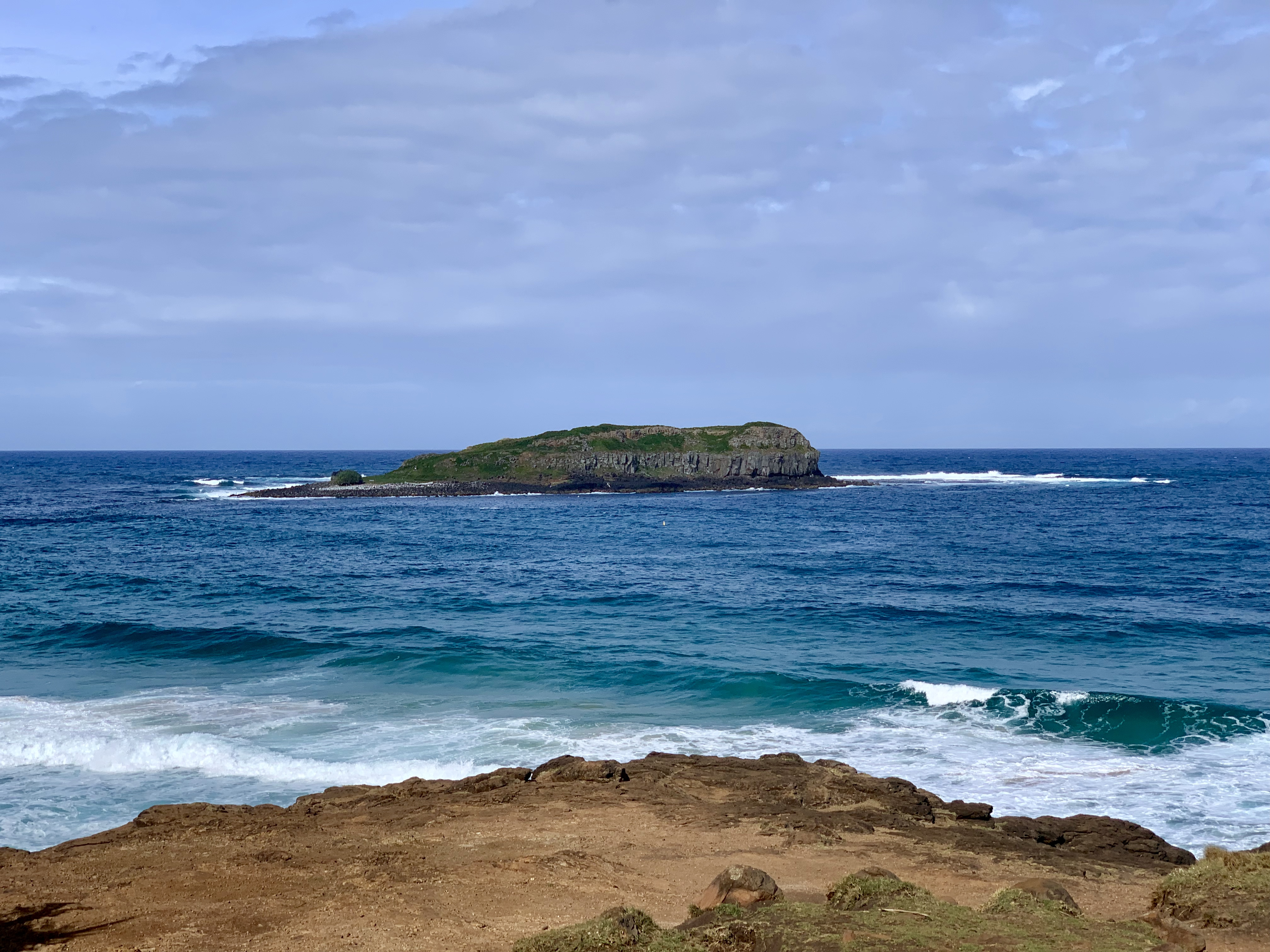
- Cook Island as seen from Fingal Head

- Location within New South Wales
- Location: New South Wales
- Coordinates: 28°11′51″S 153°34′42″E
- Area: 74 ha (180 acres)
- Established: 23 October 1998
- Governing body: Department of Primary Industries
- Website: https://www.dpi.nsw.gov.au/fishing/marine-protected-areas/aquatic-reserves/cook-island-aquatic-reserve

Cook Island Aquatic Reserve is a marine protected area in the South Pacific Ocean, located around Cook Island, about 600 metres (2,000 ft) from the Fingal Head mainland of New South Wales.

The aquatic reserve consists of the waters around the island within a radius of 500 metres (1,600 ft) of a survey marker located on the island up to the mean high water mark. It was declared on 23 October 1998 under the state's Fisheries Management Act 1994. As of 2016, its area was 74 hectares (180 acres).

The aquatic reserve consists of two zones – one extending from mean high water mark on the island to a "boundary defined by five marker buoys" where fishing is prohibited and another extending from the "marker buoys" to the outer boundary of the aquatic reserve where fishing is permitted.

The waters within the aquatic reserve are used for recreational activities including swimming, boating and diving. Thirteen moorings have been located within the aquatic reserve for use by boats to eliminate the need to anchor and therefore minimise damage to the seabed.

The aquatic reserve contains a wide variety of fish species including anemonefish, bullseyes, groupers, leatherjackets, parrotfish, pufferfish, surgeonfish, sweetlips and trevally. It is frequented by migratory shark species, blind sharks (Brachaelurus waddi), leopard sharks (Stegostoma semifasciatum) and wobbegongs. Other native animals include brittle stars, flatworms, shrimps, nudibranchs, crustaceans, green turtles, jellyfish, molluscs and stingrays. It hosts diverse fauna and was noted as an important habitat of sharks in 2009 by Tweed Shire Council's Coast and Waterways Officer, Tom Alletson.

As of 2016, the aquatic reserve has been classified under International Union for Conservation of Nature system of protected area categories with the no-fishing zone is IUCN Category II and the line fishing only zone is IUCN Category IV.

== See also ==
- Cook Island Nature Reserve
- Protected areas of New South Wales
