= Cooked =

Cooked is the past tense of the word cook. It may also refer to:

- Cooked: A Natural History of Transformation, a book by Michael Pollan
- Cooked (TV series), documentary series based on the book with the same name
- Adjective used by Generation Z that means "to be in trouble"

== See also ==
- Cook (disambiguation)
