= Cook Islands (disambiguation) =

The Cook Islands is a self-governing democracy in the Pacific in free association with New Zealand.

Cook Islands may also refer to:

- Cook Islands Federation, a former British colony

== See also ==
- Cook Island (disambiguation)
