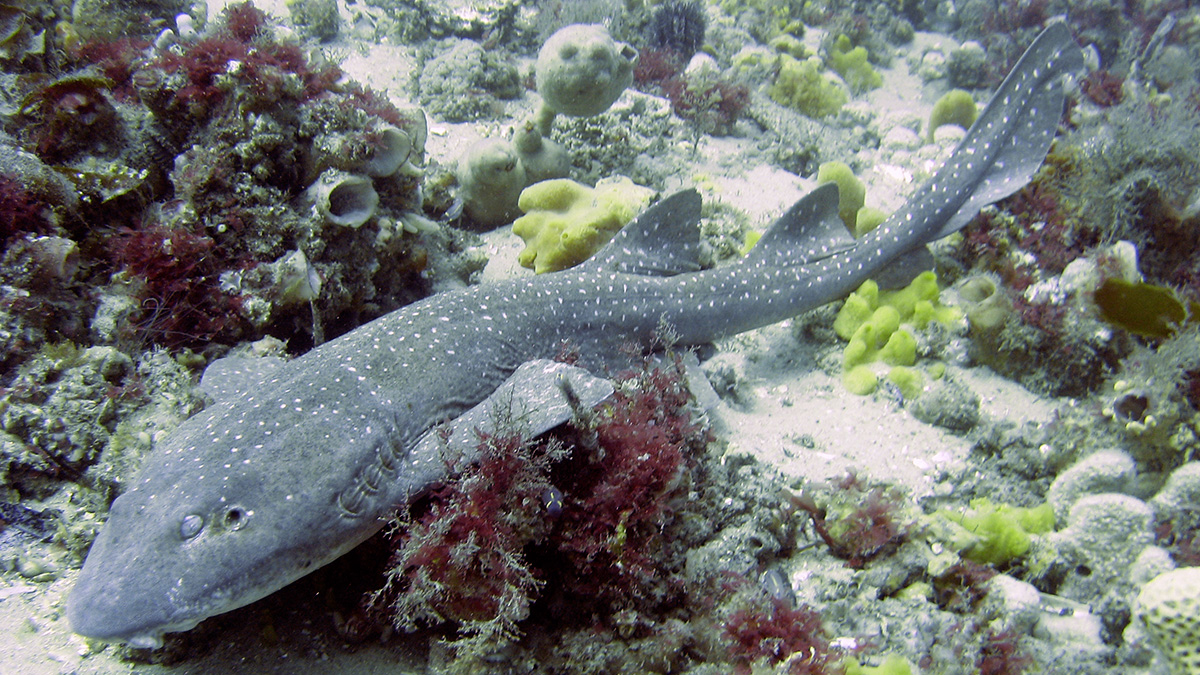
- Brachaelurus waddi

Scientific classification
- Kingdom: Animalia
- Phylum: Chordata
- Class: Chondrichthyes
- Subclass: Elasmobranchii
- Division: Selachii
- Order: Orectolobiformes
- Family: Brachaeluridae; Applegate, 1974
- Genus: Brachaelurus; Ogilby, 1908

Type species
- Chiloscyllium modestum Günther, 1872

= Brachaelurus =

Brachaelurus Temporal range: 137–0 Ma Early Cretaceous to present

Genus of sharks

Brachaelurus (blind sharks) is the sole genus of sharks in the family Brachaeluridae in the order Orectolobiformes. Only two extant species of blind sharks occur, both of which are native to shallow coastal waters up to 110 m (360 ft) deep, off the eastern coast of Australia.

They are distinguished by the presence of long barbels, large spiracles, and a groove around the nostrils. They have two dorsal fins, placed close together on the back, and a relatively short tail. Blind sharks have fully functioning eyes, but their name was given to them because when caught by anglers these eyes are closed (probably to protect them).

Blind sharks feed on small fish, cuttlefish, sea anemones, and crustaceans. The female retains the eggs in her body until they hatch (ovoviviparity), during which time the embryos feed solely on the egg yolk.

== Species ==
Two extant species in this genus are recognized:

- Brachaelurus colcloughi Ogilby, 1908 (bluegrey carpetshark)
- Brachaelurus waddi Bloch & J. G. Schneider, 1801 (blind shark)

At least one species is present in the fossil record:

- Brachaelurus estesi (Herman, 1977)

== In aquaria ==
Both the blind shark and the Coclough's shark have been successfully kept in home aquaria. In captivity, they can live to be 20 years old. They are well suited because of their small adult sizes and "predilection for tight spaces". However, they are inactive during the daytime and spend most of the daylight hours hiding in artificial caves. Brachaelurids have been successfully reared in home aquaria on diets of fresh and frozen seafood fed three times weekly. Waters at 18–24 °C (64–76 °F) have been found to be most conducive to the health of these fish. Brachaelurids have been known to consume any of their tankmates that can be successfully swallowed. Blind sharks have been induced to breed in captivity. The Sydney Aquarium has successfully maintained an entire breeding colony of blind sharks.
