= Cook Island Nature Reserve =

Protected area in Australia

- IUCN category Ia (strict nature reserve)
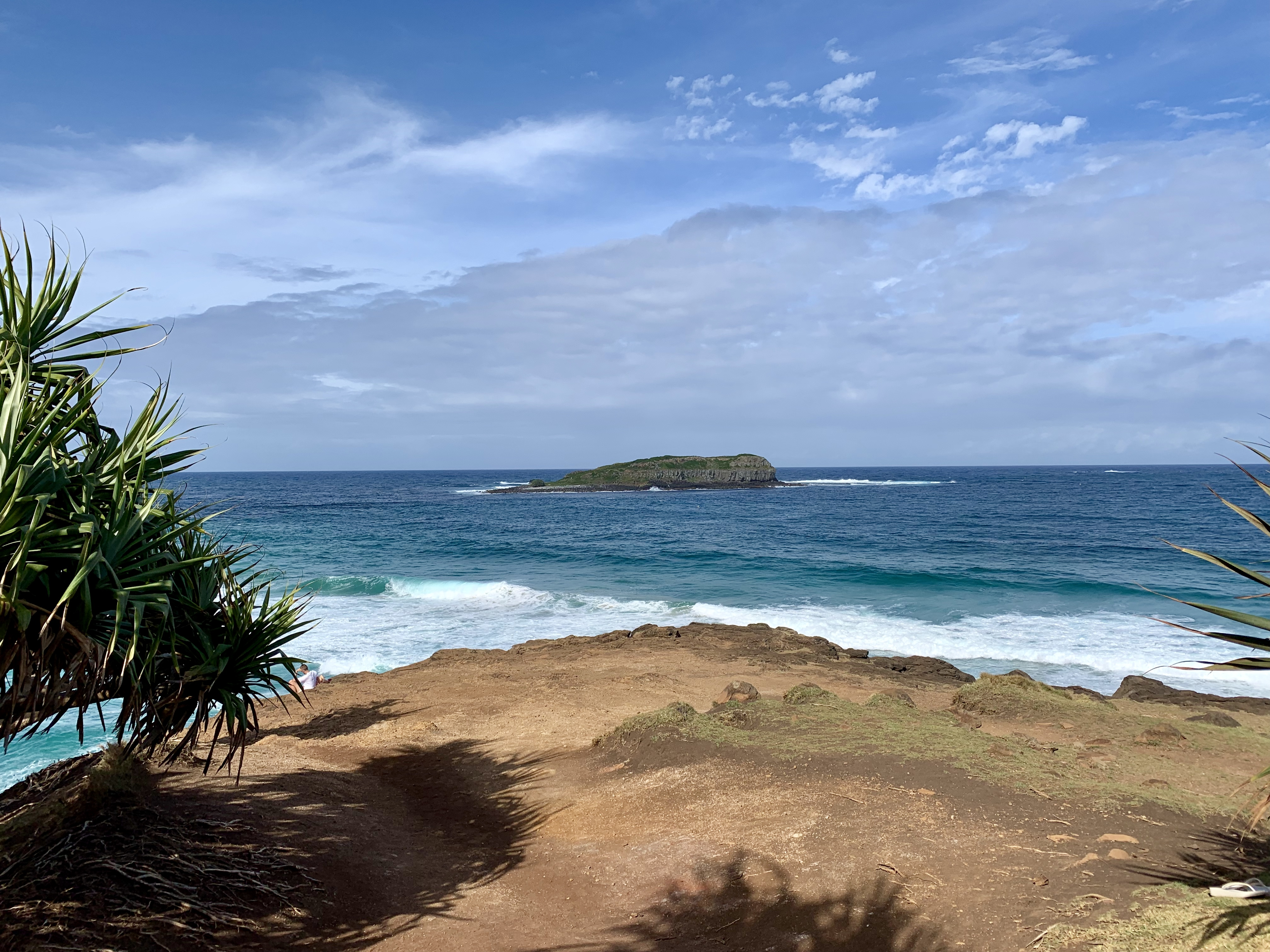
- Cook Island seen from Fingal Head, New South Wales

- Location within New South Wales
- Location: New South Wales
- Coordinates: 28°11′45″S 153°34′41″E
- Area: 5 ha (12 acres)
- Established: 7 August 1959
- Visitors: "minimal" (in 2011)
- Governing body: NSW National Parks and Wildlife Service
- Website: https://www.nationalparks.nsw.gov.au/visit-a-park/parks/cook-island-nature-reserve

Cook Island Nature Reserve is a protected area in the Australian state of new South Wales located on Cook Island about 600 metres (2,000 ft) off the coastline from the headland of Fingal Head and about 4 kilometres (2.5 mi) south-east of Tweed Heads on the state's north coast.

The nature reserve consists of the full extent of Cook Island down to the mean high water mark. The land under protection was first proclaimed as a fauna reserve under the Fauna Protection Act 1948 on 8 August 1959. It became a nature reserve under the National Parks and Wildlife Act 1967 in 1967. It is surrounded by the Cook Island Aquatic Reserve. As of 2016, it covered an area of 5 hectares (12 acres).

In 1978, the nature reserve was described as follows:

Cook Island provides a breeding habitat for seabirds, in particular the crested tern (Sterna bergii) and the wedge tailed shearwater (Puffinus pacificus). The crested tern is an international migratory bird.

The island is well vegetated with closed scrub. This vegetation provides shelter for the nesting birds. The island has a large population of wedge tailed shearwaters. Due to difficulty of access on to the island the vegetation has maintained its natural condition…

The nature reserve is classified as an IUCN Category Ia protected area. In 1978, it was listed on the now-defunct Register of the National Estate.

== See also ==
- Protected areas of New South Wales
- Nature reserve (Australia)
