= Cooke (disambiguation) =

Cooke is a surname.

Cooke may also refer to:

- Cooke County, Texas
- Cooke City, Montana
- Cooke Township, Cumberland County, Pennsylvania
- Cooke Inc., a Canadian aquaculture company
- Cooke Optics, a lens manufacturer
- Cooke triplet, an influential early lens design
- Cooke Locomotive and Machine Works, steam railroad locomotive manufacturer, founded in 1852
- HMS Cooke (K471), a British frigate in service in the Royal Navy from 1943 to 1946
- Cooke's method, a forecasting method with an expert panel, similar to the Delphi method

== See also ==
- Cook (disambiguation)
