= Cook Glacier (disambiguation) =

Cook Glacier or the Cook Ice Cap is a large ice cap in the Kerguelen Islands in the French Southern Territories zone of the far Southern Indian Ocean.

Cook Glacier or Cooke Glacier may also refer to:

- Cook Glacier (South Georgia), on the north coast of South Georgia
- Cooke Glacier, on the Fletcher Peninsula in Antarctica
