= Queen's Park, Northampton =

Queen's Park
- Map showing location of Queen's Park
- Coordinates: 52°15′15.05″N 0°53′55.05″W
- Sovereign state: United Kingdom
- Country: England
- Ceremonial county: Northamptonshire
- Unitary authority: West Northamptonshire
- Civil parish: Northampton

Area
  - Total: 0.093 sq mi (0.24 km^{2})
- Elevation: 243 ft (74 m)

Queen's Park is a district of the town of Northampton, in the West Northamptonshire district, in the ceremonial county of Northamptonshire, England.

Queen's Park is located due north of the town centre and immediately south of Kingsthorpe. It is bisected by the primary A508 road, to the west of this road is an Industrial Estate while to the east it is residential in nature. The population is included in the Trinity ward of Northampton Council.
