= Northampton Street Tramways =

Horse powered tramway company

Northampton Street Tramways Company
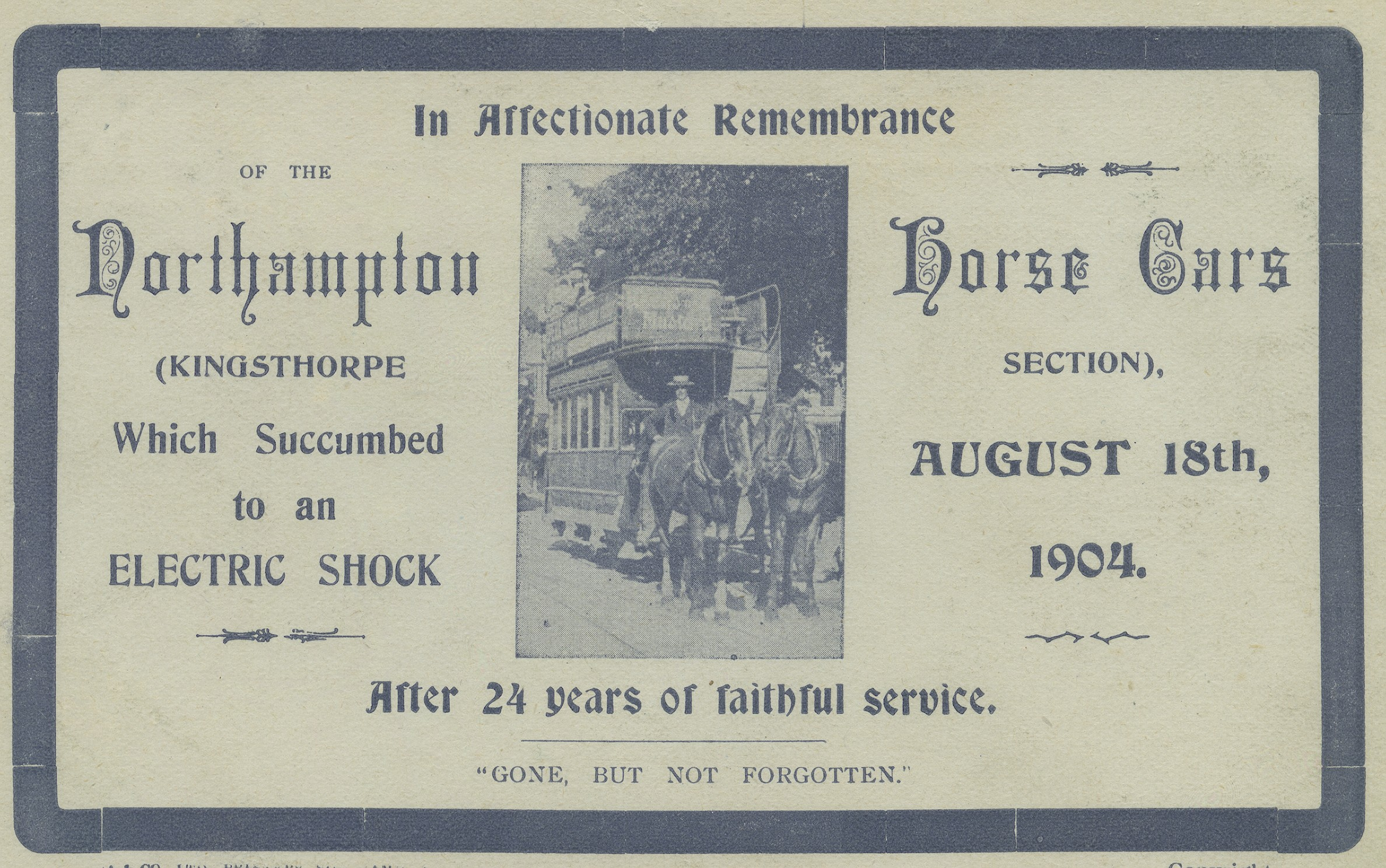
- Postcard commemorating the end of horse-drawn services in 1904

Operation
- Locale: Northampton, England, United Kingdom
- Open: 4 June 1881
- Close: 21 October 1901
- Status: Closed

Infrastructure
- Track gauge: 3 ft 6 in (1,067 mm)
- Propulsion system: horse
- Depot: Abington Street

The Northampton Street Tramways Company operated a horse powered tramway service in Northampton between 1881 and 1901.

== History ==
Northampton Street Tramways Act 1880
- Act of Parliament
- Parliament of the United Kingdom
- Long title: An Act to authorise the construction of Tramways in the Borough of Northampton and adjacent places; and for other purposes.
- Citation: 43 & 44 Vict. c. ci

Dates
- Royal assent: 2 August 1880

Other legislation
- Repealed by: Northampton Act 1988

Status: Repealed

Text of statute as originally enacted

On 9 January 1880, the Northampton Street Tramways Company was founded at a meeting in London. It quickly gained parliamentary approval in the Northampton Street Tramways Act 1880 (43 & 44 Vict. c. ci) for a network of seven lines to be built in Northampton.

Jabez Spencer Balfour was the chairman of the company. The vice-chairman was W. J. Pierce (Mayor of Northampton 1880-81). The directors were J. Pelton, D. B. Miller, and H. S. Freeman. The company signed a contract on 14 March 1881 and construction began.

The rails weighed 63 pounds (29 kg) to the 1 yard (0.91 m), were laid on wooden sleepers 4 inches (10 cm) deep by 8 inches (20 cm) broad, and 5 feet 6 inches (1.68 m) long resting on a bed of concrete 6 inches (15 cm) deep. The surrounding roadway was made with sets 5in deep by 3in and 4in in thickness, the whole being grouted with cement. The contractor for the works was Messrs. Weston and Co of London. The rails and fittings were made by Messrs. J. C. Bailey and Co of London. The engineer for the system was T. Floyd of London, assisted by Mr. Hunt, and also by Mr. Binet, the resident engineer. The portion initially opened extended from the Racecourse along Kettering Road, Abington Street, Mercers' Row, Gold Street, Marefair, Black Lion Hill, past Northampton Castle railway station, and over West Bridge to the borough boundary. It had been intended to have completed the line to the Weedon Road and Dallington Road, St James's End, but owing to complications with sewerage works, this was not initially possible.

Major General Hutchinson of the Board of Trade inspected the works at 09.00 hrs on 4 June 1881. Following some remedial works, there was an inaugural run for local dignitaries, and the tramway opened to the public on the same day at 18.00 hrs.

A trial run over the extension from All Saints’ Church to St George Terrace, Leicester Road was conducted on 23 September 1881 by Mr. H. Goulston, the manager in car number 5. It opened for passenger traffic shortly afterwards.

Stables had been erected on land behind 72 Abington Street in the town centre. The entrance to the depot was through a narrow passageway, but the land at the back provided space for 31 horses, 8 cars, a smithy, granary and fodder store. There was also initially a paddock and small grazing area for sick animals, but this was later built on with extensions to the depot. The extensions to the depot were finished in October 1881. They were built of brick with red tiles to the designs of Mr. T. Floyd C.E., with stabling initially occupied by 54 horses. There was a separate building for storing hay and corn, and for the cutting of chaff, which was done using a Phipps and Son gas engine.

In the first few months of operation the tramway appeared to be popular. With four cars in operation between 4 June and 6 October, 228,476 passengers were carried. From 7 October to 15 November with six cars in operation, 85,441 passengers were carried.

== Routes ==
The first route ran from All Saints church in the town centre, along Abington Street and Kettering Road to the White Elephant (then the Kingsley Park Hotel). It ran west down Gold Street to St James' End.

The tramway was extended to Kingsthorpe, and from the junction of Harleston Road and Duston Road to Melbourne Gardens and opened for traffic in early January 1883.

In 1884 the St James' route was extended along Weedon Road.

In 1893 an extension was built along Wellingborough Road towards Weston Favell. Major General Charles Scrope Hutchinson of the Board of Trade inspected the extension on 16 May 1893. The new route was single track save for five passing places. However, to facilitate the service that the new line entails, the line in Abingdon Street was converted to double track from Abington Square to Fish Street. The work was undertaken by the contractor Mr. R. Finnegan, Northampton for a cost of around £4,000. This route opened on 18 May 1893.

== Financial controversy ==
By 1885 there was dissent amongst the shareholders. At the meeting in August a deficit of £139 was declared, but a motion that this be not accepted was carried. There were allegations of mismanagement and falsification of the accounts. The resignation of the directors was not accepted, and an extraordinary meeting was arranged. This failed to resolve the issue and a further meeting was arranged where several of the board of directors were replaced. Six months later they reported that there was now a credit balance of £154. The company took drastic measures to achieve this, having replaced many of the poor quality horses, they dismissed all of the conductors and employed 14- to 16-year-old boys who worked for 7 shillings per week. This caused great ill feeling (as there was already considerable unemployment). Sunday services were withdrawn. Further economies were put into effect - some of the 1881 cars were modified to remove the upper deck, stairs, and lower deck windows, to reduce the weight so that they could be operated by one horse rather than two. This resulted in an immediate improvement in the company fortunes. Cost of operating the horses fell from £2,088 in 1885 to £1,476 in 1887.

== General managers ==
- Henry Goulston 1881 - 1884
- William Bignall Elliott 1884 - 1886
- Mr. Goodyear 1886
- Julius Gottschalk 1887 - 1901

== Stock ==
Six cars were ordered initially from the Birmingham Railway Carriage and Wagon Company at Smethwick. Only four were delivered in time for the opening, but the remainder followed shortly afterwards. There were seats for 18 people inside, and 18 outside. The company name was on the outside with the five-rayed star, the mark of the company, and two garters also being painted. The interior of the cars was of English ash. The body was of teak and American ash. The windows were fitted with green blinds, and the seats were covered with cushions trimmed with green Utrecht Velvet.

By 1901 they were operating 21 tramcars, three buses and owned 100 horses.

== Gas engine experiment ==
The company were keen to adopt mechanical power. A gas powered locomotive, designed and built in December 1882 at Mobbs' Vulcan Ironworks, Guildhall Road, Northampton was tested on the company tracks. On 3 March 1883 it successfully pulled a car containing a dozen people along the track by West Bridge. Nothing more is known of the subsequent history of this locomotive.

== Closure ==
The system was bought by the Northampton Corporation Tramways on 21 October 1901 for the sum of £38,700.
