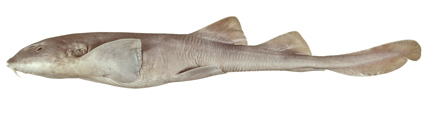

Conservation status
- Vulnerable (IUCN 3.1)

Scientific classification
- Kingdom: Animalia
- Phylum: Chordata
- Class: Chondrichthyes
- Subclass: Elasmobranchii
- Division: Selachii
- Order: Orectolobiformes
- Family: Brachaeluridae
- Genus: Brachaelurus
- Species: B. colcloughi

Binomial name
- Brachaelurus colcloughi (J. D. Ogilby, 1908)
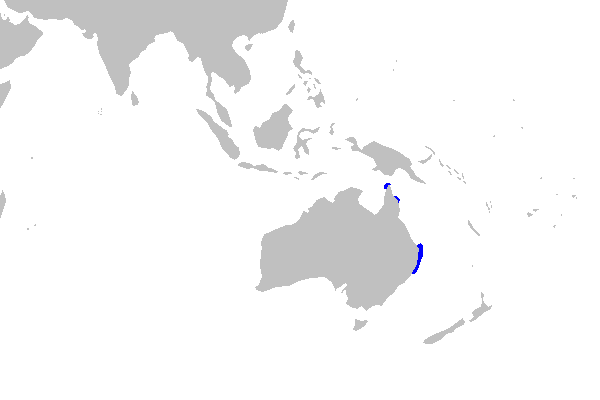
- Range of the bluegrey carpetshark

Synonyms
- Heteroscyllium colcloughi J. D. Ogilby, 1908

= Bluegrey carpetshark =

Species of shark

The bluegrey carpetshark (Brachaelurus colcloughi) or Colclough's shark, is an uncommon species of carpet shark endemic to shallow inshore waters off northeastern Australia. It is one of the two extant members of the family Brachaeluridae. The bluegrey carpetshark has a stocky body with a wide, slightly flattened head, dorsally placed eyes, and a pair of long barbels with posterior skin flaps. It has large pectoral fins, two dorsal fins of unequal size placed far back on the body, and a sizeable space between the anal fin and the base of the caudal fin. Growing to 76 cm (30 in) long, this species has a black-and-white colour pattern as a juvenile, which largely fades with age such as that adults are brownish.

When removed from the water, the bluegrey carpetshark will close its eyes like the related blind shark (Brachaelurus waddi). It feeds on benthic invertebrates and bony fishes, and is aplacental viviparous with females bearing litters of 6–7 pups. The International Union for Conservation of Nature (IUCN) has assessed this species as Vulnerable, given its rarity and restricted occurrence in heavily utilized waters. It is taken in small numbers by commercial and recreational fisheries, and for the aquarium trade.

== Taxonomy ==
The bluegrey carpetshark was described by Australian ichthyologist James Douglas Ogilby as a species of Brachaelurus, in a 1908 issue of Proceedings of the Royal Society of Queensland. He named the shark after his friend John Colclough, and based his account on two immature males about 46 cm (18 in) long from Moreton Bay in Queensland, one of which was later "accidentally destroyed".

In 1940, Gilbert Percy Whitley published the first illustrations of the bluegrey carpetshark, but unfortunately they were inaccurate in some respects, particularly on omitting a midline groove on the chin. Much taxonomic confusion then resulted, on whether the bluegrey carpetshark and the blind shark belonged to separate genera or even constituted separate species, that were not resolved until the Queensland Museum obtained new specimens for study. Other common names for this species include blue-grey catshark, bluegrey shark, and southern blind shark. The genus Heteroscyllium is a synonym of Brachaelurus.

== Distribution and habitat ==
Rare to uncommon, the bluegrey carpetshark occurs along the northeastern coast of Australia from Gladstone, Queensland to Ballina, New South Wales, with most records coming from Moreton Bay. There are also a handful of reports from off the Cape York Peninsula, and this species may be more widely distributed on the Great Barrier Reef. Demersal in nature, the bluegrey carpet shark is usually found close to shore in water less than 6 m (240 in) deep, though it has been recorded as far down as 100 m (330 ft). It inhabits soft-bottomed habitats and has also been reported around shipwrecks.

== Description ==
The bluegrey carpetshark has a stout body with a long, slightly flattened head. The snout is blunt and looks wedge-shaped from the side. The large eyes are horizontally oval and placed high on the head, each with a strong ridge underneath and a large, round spiracles following immediately behind and below. The nostrils are preceded by a pair of long barbels, which have an enlarged posterior flap halfway along their lengths. There are well-developed skin flaps and grooves around the incurrent nostril opening, as well as a pair of grooves connecting them to the small, almost transverse mouth. The tooth rows number 32–34 in the upper jaw and 21–29 in the lower jaw; each tooth has an upright, awl-like central cusp and two lateral cusplets. The five pairs of gill slits are short, with the fourth and fifth pairs more closely spaced than the others.

The pectoral and pelvic fins are broad and rounded, with the former larger than the latter. The two dorsal fin have rounded apices and are placed far back, with the first originating over the pelvic fin bases. The second dorsal fin is noticeably smaller than the first. The anal fin is less than half the size of the first dorsal fin and placed so that its free rear tip just reaches the base of the caudal fin. The caudal fin is long and low and comprises about a quarter of the total length, with no lower lobe and a strong ventral notch near the tip of the upper lobe. The dermal denticles are tiny, smooth, and non-overlapping. Adults are grayish to golden brown above and white below, with faint darker saddles and white patches on the dorsal fins. Juveniles have a striking pattern of large black markings on a white background. This species can grow up to 76 cm (30 in) long.

== Biology and ecology ==
Like the blind shark, the bluegrey carpetshark shuts its lower eyelids when taken out of the water. It feeds on small benthic invertebrates and bony fishes. This species is aplacental viviparous, with the unborn young losing their egg cases early in development and being sustained by yolk sacs. Females bear litters of 6–7 young; the newborns measure around 17–18 cm (6.7–7.1 in) long.

== Human interactions ==
Harmless to humans, the bluegrey carpetshark is occasionally captured incidentally by commercial fisheries or hooked by recreational anglers. Small numbers are collected for the private aquarium trade, as it is attractive (especially young sharks) and probably adapts well to captivity. The International Union for Conservation of Nature has assessed this species as Vulnerable, citing its narrow habitat preferences, limited range in a heavily populated region, and apparent rarity.
