= Cook Township =

Cook Township may refer to:

- Cook Township, Sac County, Iowa
- Cook Township, Decatur County, Kansas
- Cook Township, Westmoreland County, Pennsylvania

== See also ==
- Cook (disambiguation)
