= Cooks =

Cooks may refer to:

- Cooks (islet), islet in Palmerston Island in the Cook Islands
- Cooks (surname)
- ...Cooks!, British television cooking show
- Cooks, Michigan, unincorporated community in Schoolcraft County, Michigan, United States
- Cooks Venture, former poultry company

== See also ==
- Cook (disambiguation)
