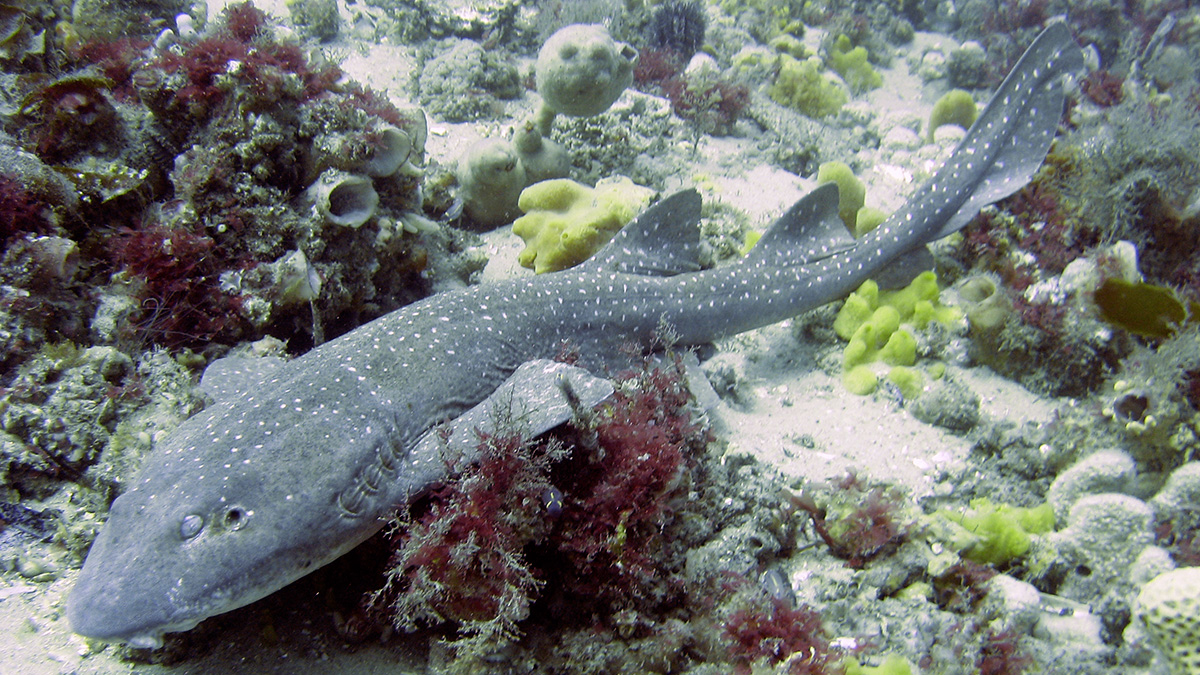
- Off Nelson Bay, New South Wales

Conservation status
- Least Concern (IUCN 3.1)

Scientific classification
- Kingdom: Animalia
- Phylum: Chordata
- Class: Chondrichthyes
- Subclass: Elasmobranchii
- Division: Selachii
- Order: Orectolobiformes
- Family: Brachaeluridae
- Genus: Brachaelurus
- Species: B. waddi

Binomial name
- Brachaelurus waddi (Bloch & J. G. Schneider, 1801)
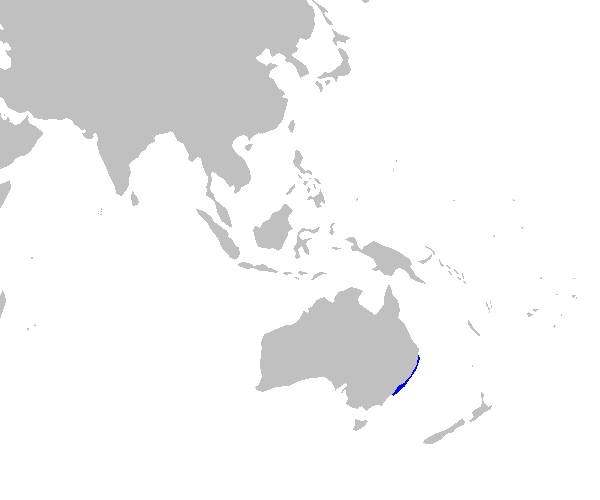
- Range of the blind shark

Synonyms
- Chiloscyllium furvum Macleay, 1881; Chiloscyllium fuscum Parker & Haswell, 1897; Chiloscyllium modestum Günther, 1872; Squalus waddi Bloch & J. G. Schneider, 1801

= Blind shark =

Blind shark Temporal range: Late Cretaceous–Recent

Species of shark

The blind shark (Brachaelurus waddi) is one of two species of carpet sharks in the family Brachaeluridae, along with the bluegrey carpetshark (Brachaelurus colcloughi). Found along the coast of eastern Australia, this nocturnal, bottom-dwelling species is common in rocky areas and seagrass beds from the intertidal zone to a depth of 140 m (460 ft). It often roams in tidal pools where it may be trapped by the receding tide, and can survive for an extended period out of water.

Maturing at under 62–66 cm (24–26 in) long, the blind shark has a stocky, grayish to brownish body with white flecks and darker bands that fade with age. Its head is wide, flattened, and blunt, with small eyes on top and a pair of long barbels underneath. It has large pectoral fins, two nearly equal-sized dorsal fins placed far back on the body, and an anal fin placed close to the caudal fin. The blind shark feeds primarily on small invertebrates and bony fishes. It is aplacental viviparous with females bearing litters of 7–8 pups in the summer. This small shark adapts readily to being kept in captivity. It is not valued by either commercial or recreational fishers, and its hardiness means that incidentally caught individuals are likely to be returned to the water alive. In the absence of substantial threats to its population, the International Union for Conservation of Nature has assessed it as of Least Concern.

== Taxonomy and phylogeny ==
German naturalists Marcus Elieser Bloch and Johann Gottlob Schneider originally described the blind shark as Squalus waddi, in their 1801 Systema Ichthyologiae. However, there is uncertainty over whether their account was referring to this species or the brownbanded bamboo shark (Chiloscyllium punctatum), as it was based on a painting by John Latham that could not be located by subsequent authors. In 1907, James Douglas Ogilby coined the genus Brachaelurus for this species, from the Greek brachys meaning "short", and ailouros meaning "cat". In 1973, Leonard Compagno placed it and the bluegrey carpetshark in their own family. This shark may also be referred to as the brown catshark or dusky dogfish.

Various phylogenetic studies, based on morphology, have concluded that the blind shark lineage represents the sister taxon to the wobbegongs. Blind shark fossils have been found in Late Cretaceous period (99.6–65.5 Ma) deposits from Europe, as well as in Pliocene epoch (5.3–2.6 Ma) deposits from Chile and Peru. A number of other Brachaelurus species are also known from the fossil record.

== Distribution and habitat ==
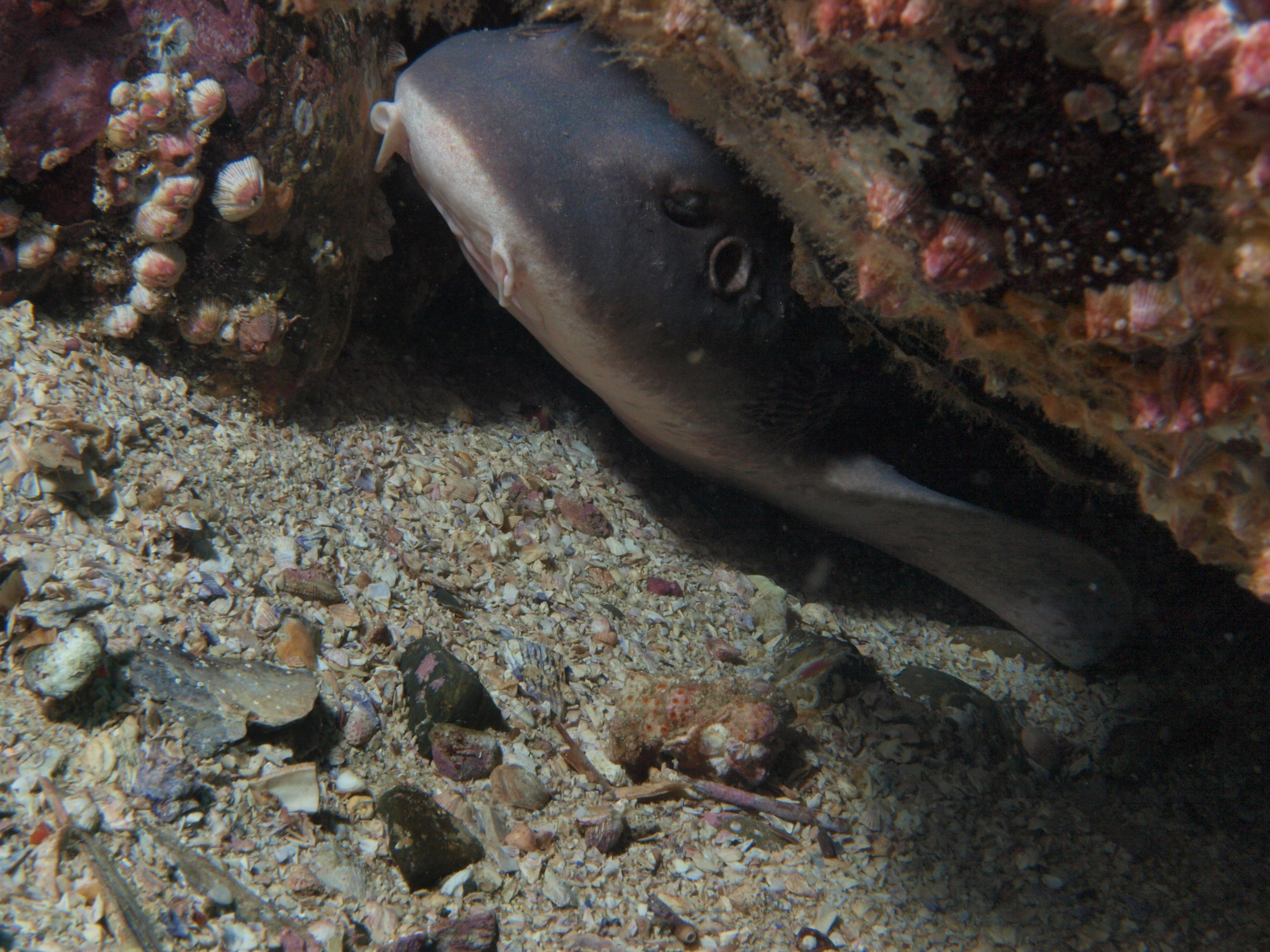
The blind shark favors rocky habitats.

The range of the blind shark is restricted to the eastern coast of Australia, from Mooloolaba in southern Queensland to Jervis Bay in New South Wales; past reports from off Western Australia and Northern Territory appear to be misidentifications of the brownbanded bamboo shark. The blind shark is a bottom-dwelling species that generally inhabits the continental shelf from the intertidal zone, including tidal pools barely deep enough to cover its body, to a depth of 73 m (240 ft), though it has been recorded as deep as 140 m (460 ft). Preferred habitats are rocky areas and adjacent seagrass beds; juveniles are common in high-energy surge zones. In Nelson Bay, this shark has been observed lying in the open atop sponges.

== Description ==
The blind shark has a stocky body and a wide, somewhat flattened head with a blunt snout. The small, oval eyes are situated high on the head and have strong ridges underneath; the oval spiracles are positioned behind and below and have obvious raised rims. The nostrils are placed almost at the tip of the snout and have long, tapering barbels in front and well-developed skin flaps and grooves around the incurrent openings. A pair of obvious grooves connect the nostrils to the small, almost transverse mouth. There are 32–34 upper tooth rows and 21–29 lower tooth rows; each tooth has an upright, awl-shaped central cusp and a pair of lateral cusplets. The five pairs of gill slits are small, with the fifth pair close to the fourth.

The pectoral fins are large and broad, with rounded margins. The two dorsal fins are roughly equal in size and have rounded apices and angular free rear tips; the first dorsal fin originates over the bases of the pelvic fins. The pelvic fins are rounded and almost as large as the pectoral fins. The anal fin is less than half the size of the dorsal fins and is positioned very close to the base of the long, low caudal fin. The caudal fin comprises about a quarter of the total length, with no ventral lobe and a strong ventral notch near the tip of the upper lobe. The dermal denticles are large, giving the skin a rough texture. This species is light to dark brown above, often with white flecks, and lighter below. Juveniles also have dark bands over the body and tail, which fade with age. The blind shark can reach a length of 0.9–1.2 m (3.0–3.9 ft), though most are much smaller.

== Biology and ecology ==
Contrary to its common name, the blind shark has "perfectly adequate" vision. It was so named by anglers because it retracts its eyeballs and shuts its thick lower eyelids when removed from the water. This species can live for up to 18 hours out of water, allowing it to survive being stranded by the outgoing tide. The blind shark is secretive and sluggish during the day, with adults usually hiding in caves or under ledges and juveniles inside crevices, though it will take food given the opportunity. At night, it moves out over reefs and seagrass meadows to forage for small invertebrates (including crabs, shrimp, cephalopods, and sea anemones) and bony fishes. Prey items are captured via suction.

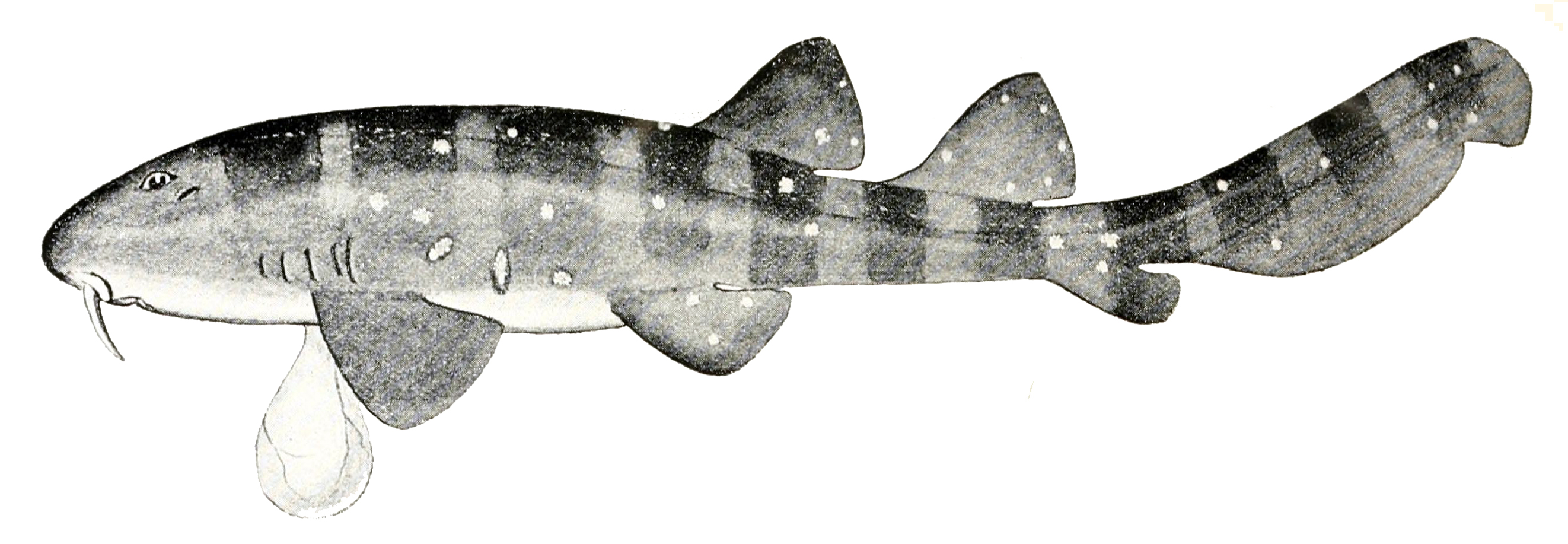
Illustration of a blind shark fetus, with the yolk sac not yet completely absorbed

The blind shark is aplacental viviparous with a possibly annual reproductive cycle. Females give birth to 7–8 pups during the summer; newborns measure 15–18 cm (5.9–7.1 in) long. Sexual maturity is attained at under a length of 62 cm (24 in) for males, and 66 cm (26 in) for females. It has lived to 20 years old in captivity. A known parasite of this shark is an undescribed species of tapeworm in the genus Carpobothrium.

== Human interactions ==
The blind shark is basically harmless to humans, though it can bite if provoked and is difficult to remove, owing to its strong jaws and powerful suction. There are cases of blind sharks biting and holding onto divers' wetsuits even after they surfaced, and could only be removed by prying open the sharks' jaws. This species is one of the few sharks considered suitable for private aquaria, as it is hardy, grows to a small size, and has sedentary habits, though its nocturnal, reclusive nature make it difficult to observe. The blind shark has even been induced to breed in captivity, with the Sydney Aquarium having successfully maintained a breeding colony.

Commercial fisheries do not target or utilize the blind shark, as its flesh has a strong ammonia-like taste that is not easily removed. It is caught incidentally by prawn trawl and other fisheries off Queensland and New South Wales, though post-discard survival may be high due to its ability to tolerate being out of water. Small numbers of blind sharks are caught by recreational fishers, who regard them as a nuisance because its small mouth and strong jaws make removing lodged hooks difficult. It is generally too small to be susceptible to shark nets used to protect beaches. The impact of collection for the aquarium trade on this shark is unknown but not thought to be severe. The International Union for Conservation of Nature (IUCN) has listed the blind shark under Least Concern, as it remains abundant and the various pressures on its population do not seem to pose significant threats. Its range overlaps a number of current and proposed Marine Protected Areas (MPAs).

== See also ==
- List of prehistoric cartilaginous fish
