= Cook Island (New South Wales) =

Island in New South Wales, Australia

Native name: Joong-urra-narrian
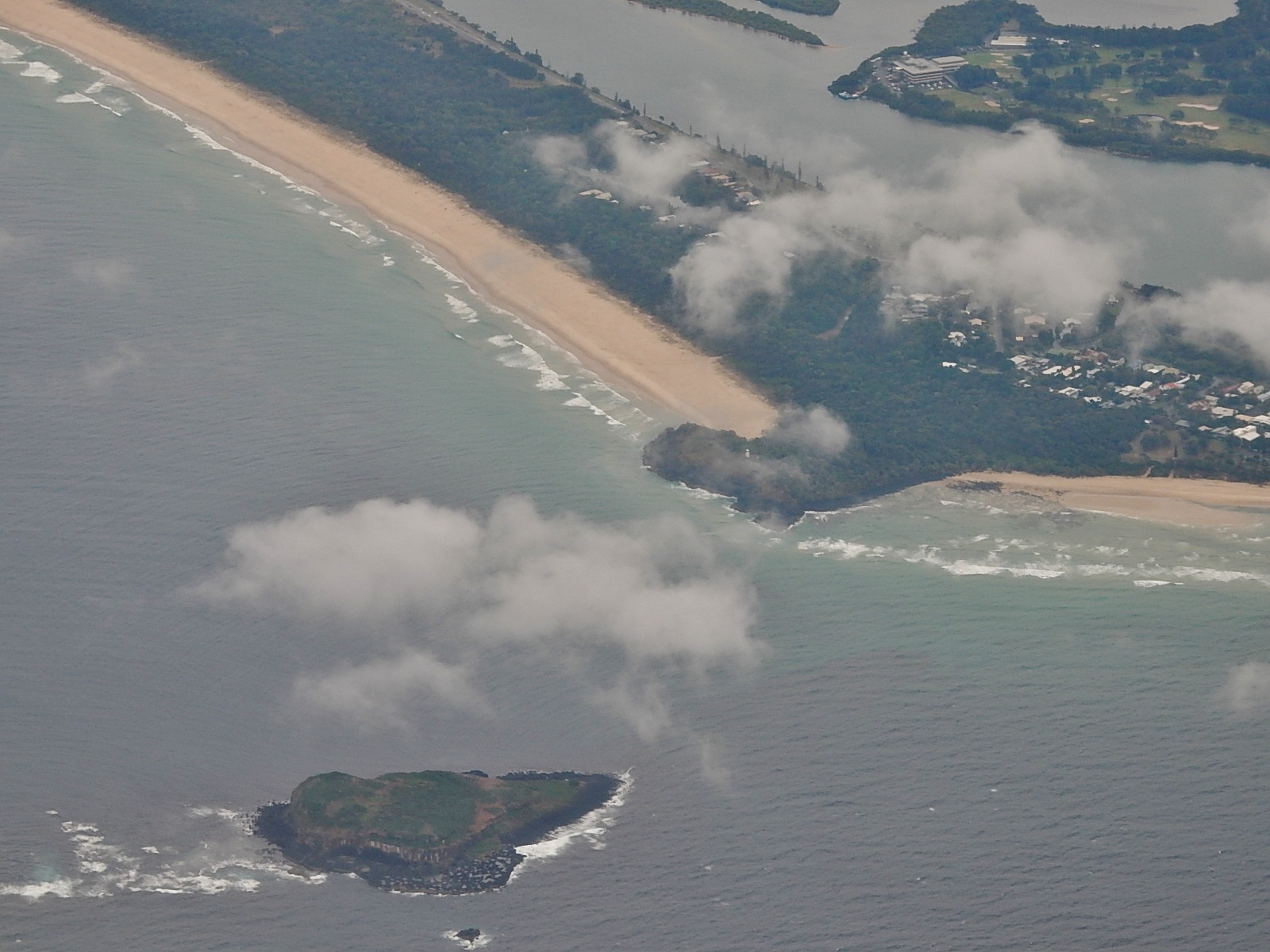
- Aerial view of Cook Island and Fingal Head, New South Wales

- Location in New South Wales
- Etymology: James Cook

Geography
- Location: Coral Sea
- Coordinates: 28°11′54″S 153°35′04″E
- Area: 4.6 ha (11 acres)
- Highest elevation: 24.8 m (81.4 ft)

Administration
- Australia
- state: New South Wales
- Local government area: Tweed Shire

Demographics
- Population: 0

Additional information
- Time zone: AEST (UTC+10)
  - Summer (DST): AEDT (UTC+11)

Cook Island, formerly Cooks Island, Turtle Island and Joong-urra-narrian, is an island in the Australian state of New South Wales located on the state's north coast about 600 metres (2,000 ft) north-east of Fingal Head and 4 kilometres (2.5 mi) south-east of the town of Tweed Heads.

== Description ==
=== Geology and topography ===
Cook Island is formed of “rocks from the Lismore Basalt Group, formed by lava flows from the Mount Warning Shield Volcano approximately 20 million years ago.” The Island is a “protrusion of eroded basalt” of a maximum height of 24.8 metres (81 ft) above sea level and topped with a plateau. The western side of the island has a “gentle” slope while the remaining sides are “sheer cliffs” dropping to “low-lying rock shelves”. The top of the island and its western side are overlaid by a “shallow cover of topsoil.” A “semi-permanent freshwater basin” is located in the island's northern side.

=== Climate ===
In 2011, the average annual rainfall was reported as being 1,470 millimetres (58 in).

=== Access ===
Access to the island is considered to be not “easy” by the NSW National Parks and Wildlife Service because of the “exposed rocky nature” of the island's coastline and “frequently rough sea conditions.” Access is not promoted to “protect roosting birds and the nest burrows of wedge-tailed shearwaters which are fragile and can easily collapse under foot traffic.”

== Flora and fauna ==
=== Flora ===
As of 2011, there were twenty five native plant species which occupied, in part, three distinct habitats - “elevated locations; rocky crevices; and lower sites at the base of cliffs.”

=== Fauna ===
As of 2011, vertebrate animals were represented by 25 species of birds and two reptile species. These included 12 bird species listed as migratory species under the Environment Protection and Biodiversity Conservation Act 1999 and seven fauna species listed as threatened in New South Wales.

== History ==
=== Aboriginal history ===
Cook Island is located within the area historically occupied by the "Minjungbal people of the Bundjalung nation." Also, the island is the subject of "traditional knowledge" held by the Githabul and Yugambeh aboriginal people. As of 2011, while the Government of New South Wales did not know of any sites on the island of significance to Aboriginal people, the Aboriginal community did know of a "number of Aboriginal mythological stories" and of "some sites" associated with the island. For example, the island is known by the "Coodjinburra clan of the Bungjalung people" as Joongurra-Narrian which translates as "the place of pelicans".

=== European history ===
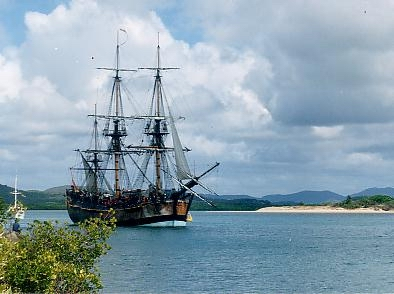
Endeavour replica in Cooktown Harbour

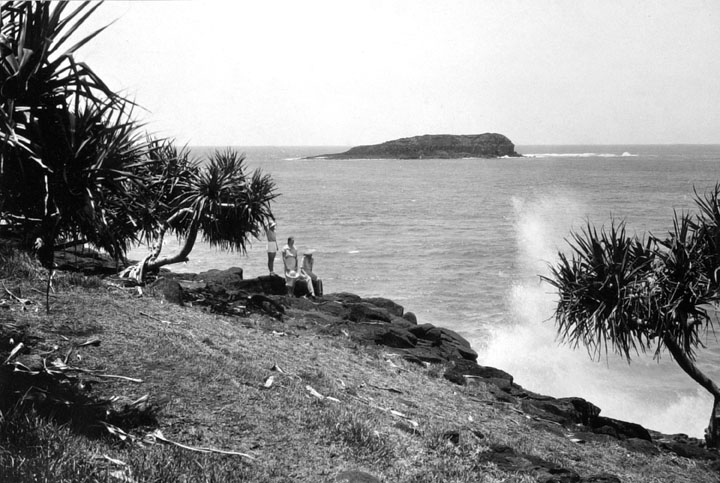
View from Fingal Head, circa 1934

The first recorded European sighting of Cook Island was made by the English navigator James Cook, who sighted the coast of Fingal Head in 1770. Cook charted the coastline of the island, but made no attempt at settlement. Cook then continued sailing north along the eastern coast of Australia and named two nearby landmarks, Mount Warning and Point Danger, after he was nearly shipwrecked there.

In 1823, English explorer John Oxley anchored at the island to take refuge from southerly winds. Two crew members then visited the island and named it Turtle Island, after finding sea turtles and an unidentified shipwreck. Five years later, British admiral Henry John Rous surveyed the Tweed River and named the island, Cook's Isle, the name that has persisted.

Australian spearfisher Ben Cropp reported the sighting of a European vessel, wrecked on the island in the 16th century. In 2008, two fishermen, Joel Coombs and Malcolm Anable, were rescued from nearby the island, and later hospitalised, after they were thrown overboard as a result of their boat overturning.

In 1970, the name Cook Island was officially assigned to the island, replacing Cooks Island.

Since 1998, the island has been managed by the Department of Climate Change, Energy, the Environment and Water and since 2004, by the Department of Primary Industries and Regional Development, as well. It is under the jurisdiction of the Tweed Shire Council, who hold annual clean-up events.

== Protected areas status ==
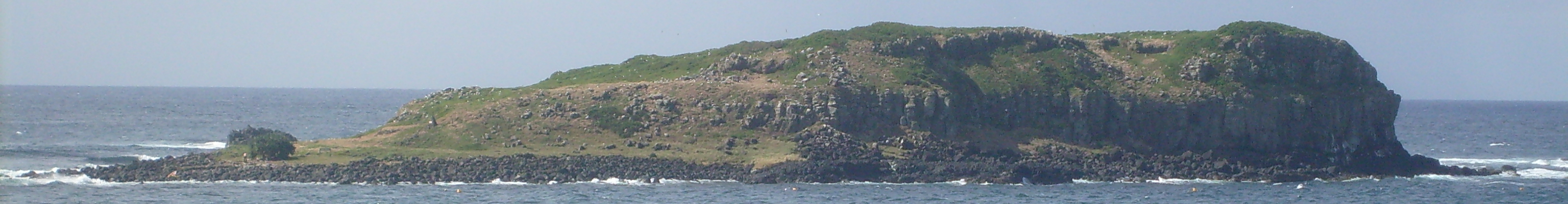
Panorama of Cook Island, in 2009, from Fingal Head

The entirety of Cook Island has been the subject of protected area status since 1959 and since 1967, it has been located within the Cook Island Nature Reserve. The waters adjoining the island have been located within the Cook Island Aquatic Reserve since 1998.
