= Cook Hill =

Cook Hill may refer to the following:

- Cook Hill (Albany County, New York), a summit in New York, United States
- Cook Hill, Grenada, a town in Saint Andrew Parish, Grenada

== See also ==
- Cookhill, a village and civil parish in Worcestershire, England
- Cooks Hill, New South Wales, Australia
