= Cooke Glacier =

Glacier in Antarctica

- Location within Antarctica
- Location: Ellsworth Land
- Coordinates: 72°44′S 88°34′W
- Length: 6 nautical miles (11 km; 6.9 mi)
- Thickness: unknown
- Terminus: Fletcher Peninsula
- Status: unknown

Cooke Glacier (72°44′S 88°34′W) is a glacier about 6 nautical miles (11 km) long flowing north from the northern end of the Fletcher Peninsula. It was named by the Advisory Committee on Antarctic Names after Kirsten Cooke Healey, of the United States Geological Survey (USGS), Woods Hole, Massachusetts, a computer graphics specialist from the mid-1990s onwards for the USGS project that is compiling the Satellite Image Atlas of Glaciers and 25 Glaciological and Coastal-Change Maps of Antarctica.

== See also ==
- List of glaciers in the Antarctic
- Glaciology
