= Cook River =

Cook River may refer to:

- Cook River / Weheka, on the south island of New Zealand
- Cook River (Jacques-Cartier River tributary), in Jacques-Cartier National Park, Quebec, Canada
- Cook River (Tobago), see List of rivers of Trinidad and Tobago

== See also ==
- Cooks River, a tributary of Botany Bay, New South Wales, Australia
