= Northampton Corporation Tramways =

Tram operator in Northamptonshire, England (1901–1934)

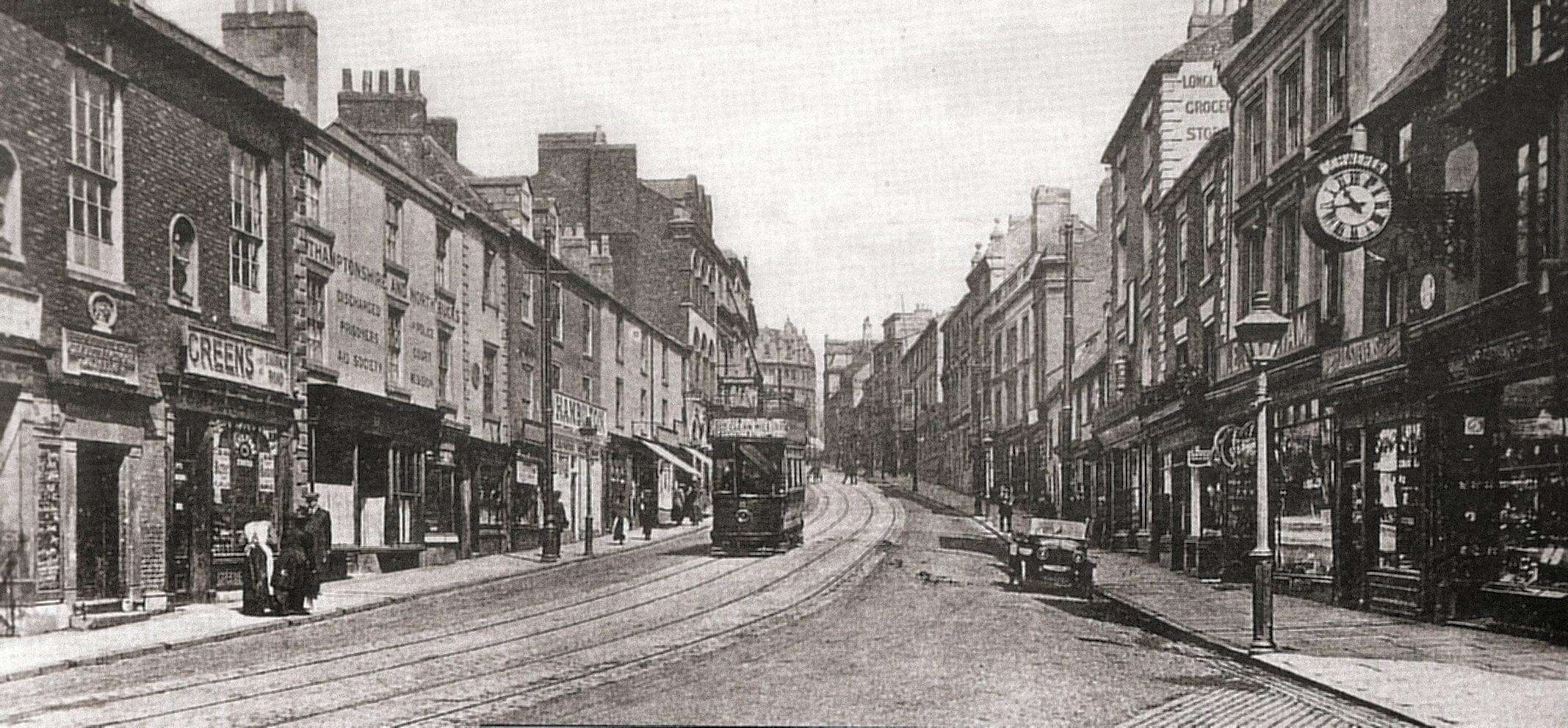
- Bridge Street, Northampton ca. 1918

Operation
- Locale: Northampton, Northamptonshire, England
- Open: 21 October 1901
- Close: 15 December 1934
- Status: Closed

Infrastructure
- Track gauge: 3 ft 6 in (1,067 mm)
- Propulsion system: Electric

Statistics
- Route length: 8 1/4 miles (13.3 km)

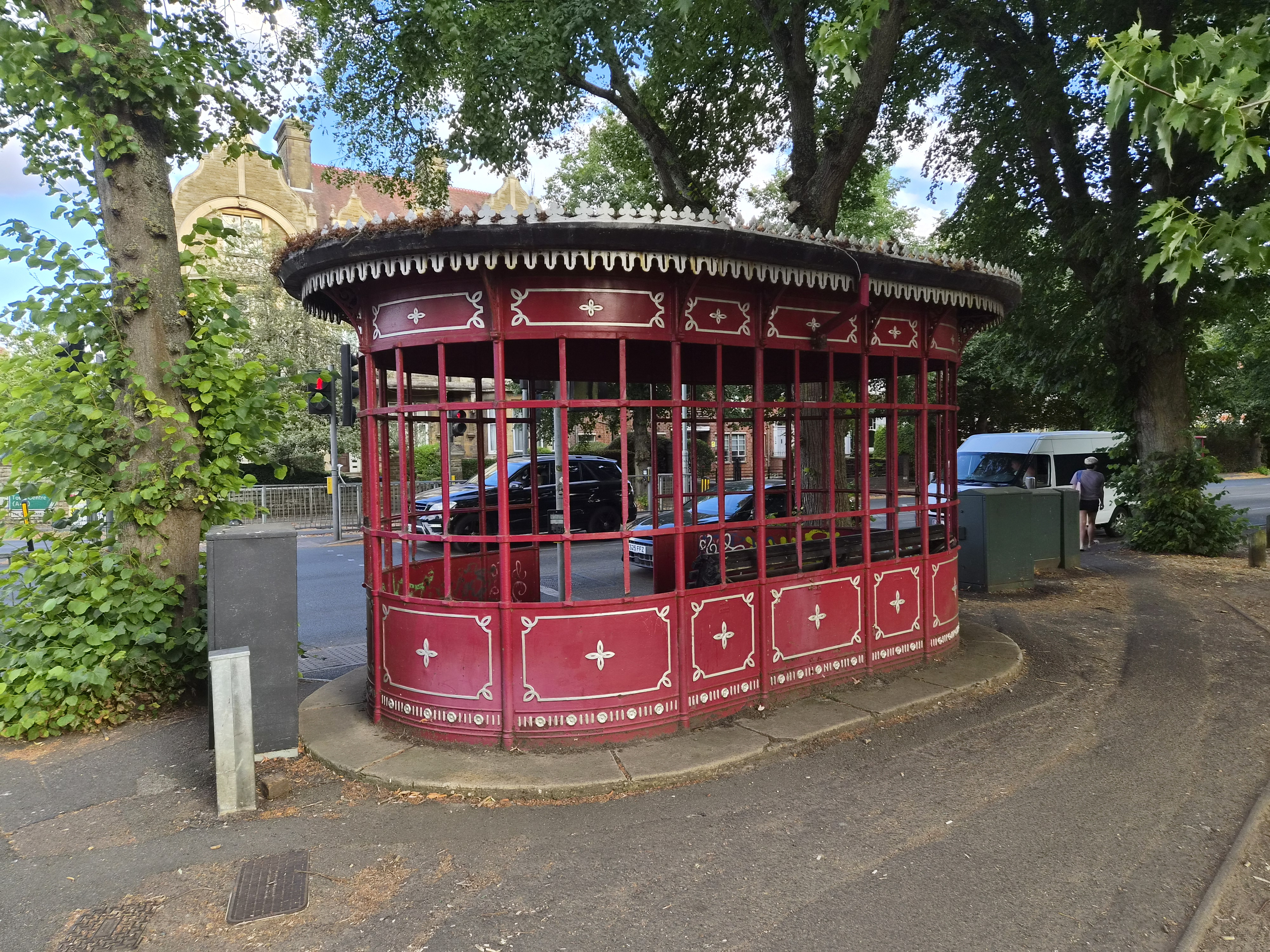
One of the two remaining tram stop at Racecource park.

Northampton Corporation Tramways operated the tramway service in the town of Northampton, in Northamptonshire, England, between 1901 and 1934.

== History ==
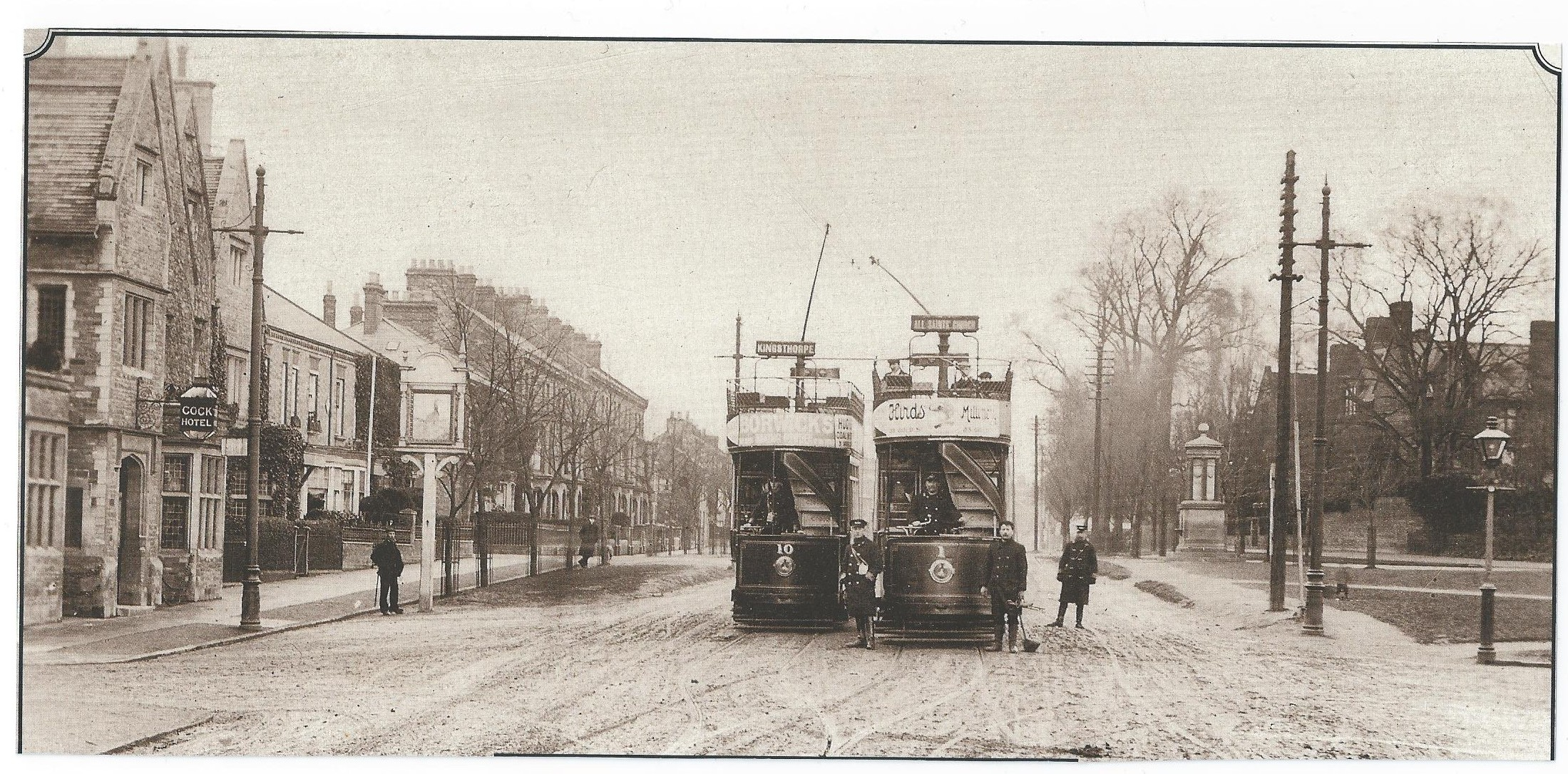
Trams at the Cock Hotel, Kingsthorpe, Northampton, circa 1905

The company was purchased from the Northampton Street Tramways Company on 21 October 1901, for the sum of £38,700 (equivalent to £4,110,000 in 2025). It continued to operate horse-drawn tramcars whilst the electrification work was planned. Once the electric services were ready, the horse drawn assets were sold quickly at auctions run by W. J. Pierce in Northampton. Seventy horses and six tramcars were sold on 29 July 1904; the remaining 15 horses and eight tramcars which had been held over to work the Kingsthorpe section were sold at auction in August 1904. The Duke of Buccleuch paid 38 guineas for a bay gelding; the remaining horses sold for between 14 guineas and 30 guineas. The tramcars (originally purchased for £150 to £170 each) sold for between £4 and £7 each.

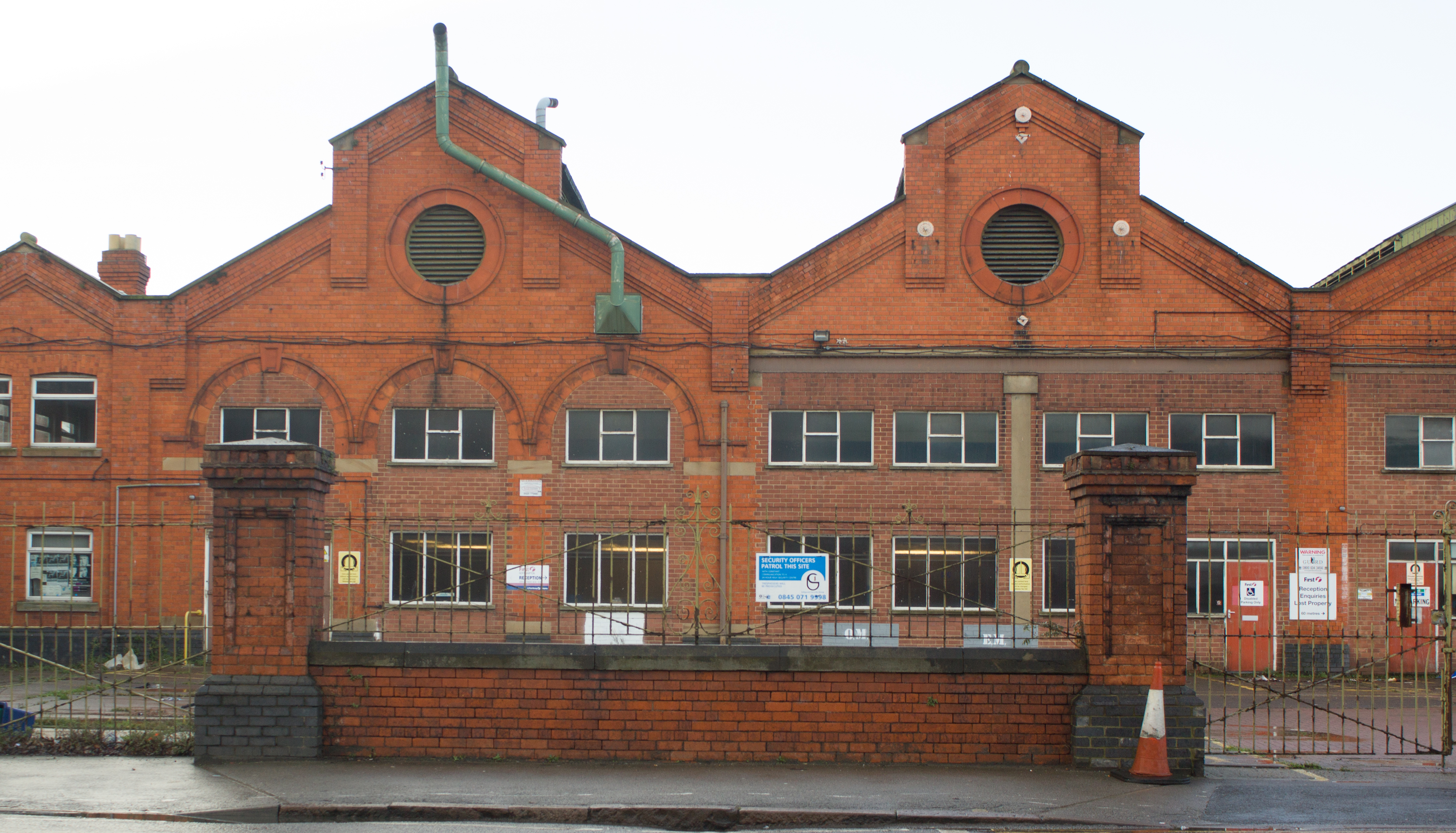
The St James's End depot

A new depot was constructed in St James’ End with the provision for 24 cars in a building 120 feet (37 m) long and 70 feet (21 m) in two spans of 35 feet (11 m) with six lines of rails. The back of the building was closed with a temporary end to provide for future extensions. The power generating station was constructed at the refuse destructor site in Castle Street. The generating station was equipped with two 200 kW sets in duplicate with a 120 kW set for taking light loads. Construction of both started in October 1903.

The work of converting the permanent way into an electric tramway system started on 20 January 1904, when contractors began to lay new lines on Wellingborough Road. The first electric service started on Thursday 21 July 1904, when an inauguration ceremony was held in Mercers’ Row. The inaugural car carried the Mayoress and departed along Abington Street to St Matthew’s Church, followed by two other cars. They then returned and ran to the other terminus at Franklin’s Gardens. By the end of the day, all 20 cars were running in service.

The initial services operated over 5 1/2 miles (8.9 km). In 1913, the council approved a report from the Tramways Committee which recommended the expenditure of £10,850 (equivalent to £1,082,400 in 2025) for the purchase of additional plant and tramcars. The cost of four new tramcars was put at £2,600, the extension to the sheds was £2,400, an engine and generator for £2,300 and battery for £2,100. The tram service was now carrying 7.5 million passengers per annum, compared with five million in 1906.

The extension to Far Cotton was built for the sum of £20,352 11s 10d (equivalent to £2,030,400 in 2025) by Messrs Stark and Co. of Glasgow. Three new tramcars were ordered from the Brush Electrical Engineering Company of Loughborough for £460 (equivalent to £45,900 in 2025) per car; Dick Kerr and Company of Preston provided the electrical equipment for £289 14s. 6d. (equivalent to £28,900 in 2025) per car The construction of the new line to Far Cotton required the widening of Northampton's South Bridge from 30 feet (9.1 m) to 50 feet (15 m). The cost of widening the bridge was between £6,000 and £7,000. The new line to Far Cotton opened on 23 October 1914. It took the tramway to a total route length of 6.41 miles (10.32 km).

The First World War resulted in some restrictions in services. The halfpenny fare was abolished but it was agreed that wounded soldiers in blue uniforms would be allowed to ride free of charge. Like many tramways, the company struggled with the recruitment of male tramway employees into the armed forces and, on 20 December 1915, the first female conductors were employed. The women were employed on a contract to work 54 hours per week and they were paid at the same rate as men conductors, £1 0s. 3d. (equivalent to £89.99 in 2025). Towards the end of the war, it was reported that some of the women were working 70 hours per week due to the prevalence of sickness and consequent lost time.

The Sunday service was reintroduced in 1919.

There was some financial difficulty after the war. In 1919, the losses were reported as £2,447 on expenditure of £50,058; by 1921, losses had increased to £8,900. However, by 1924, the situation had improved and a profit of £9,000 was reported.

== Fleet ==
There were 37 tramcars in the Northampton fleet:

- 1-20 built in 1904 by Electric Railway & Tramway Carriage Works
- 21-22 built in 1905 by Electric Railway & Tramway Carriage Works
- 23-24 built in 1910 by United Electric Car Company
- 25-26 built in 1911 by United Electric Car Company
- 27-33 built in 1914 by Brush Electrical Machines
- 34-37 built in 1921 by English Electric.

The livery was vermilion and white.

== Closure ==
The system was closed on 15 December 1934.

Two tram stops survive in Northampton: one is near the Racecourse and the other is on Kingsthorpe Grove.
