= USS Cook =

Three ships of the United States Navy have been named Cook

- USS Cook (APD-130), was launched on 26 August 1944. Named after two brothers: Andrew F. Cook, Jr. and Dallas H. Cook.
- USS Cook (FF-1083), was launched on 23 January 1971. Named after Lieutenant Commander Wilmer Cook, USN.

The third ship, currently in commission, is named after Donald Cook, a Vietnam War POW:

- USS Donald Cook, launched on 3 May 1997.
