= Cook Hollow =

Valley in Missouri, United States

Coordinates: 36.8392216°N 91.2995785°W

Cook Hollow is a valley in Oregon County in the U.S. state of Missouri.

Cook Hollow most likely has the name of a local family.
