= Cook Trading =

British frozen food company

Cook Trading Ltd
- Type: Private
- Industry: Retailer
- Founded: 1997
- Headquarters: Sittingbourne
- Key people: Edward Perry, founder and joint CEO; Rosie Brown, joint CEO; Dale Penfold, founder
- Products: Food
- Website: www.cookfood.net

Cook (stylized as COOK, officially Cook Trading Ltd) is a Sittingbourne, England–based manufacturer and retailer of frozen ready meals, founded in 1997 by Edward Perry and Dale Penfold.

== History ==
Cook was founded in 1997 by Edward Perry and Dale Penfold as a frozen meals shop in Farnham.

In March 2005, Cook opened a new kitchen facility in Sittingbourne. In 2006, Cook's official website was launched, enabling home delivery across the UK. Cook was a founding member of B Corp UK in 2013.

The company opened its 100th shop at Poynton, Cheshire in March 2024.
