= Fingal Head, New South Wales =

Fingal Head
- Town
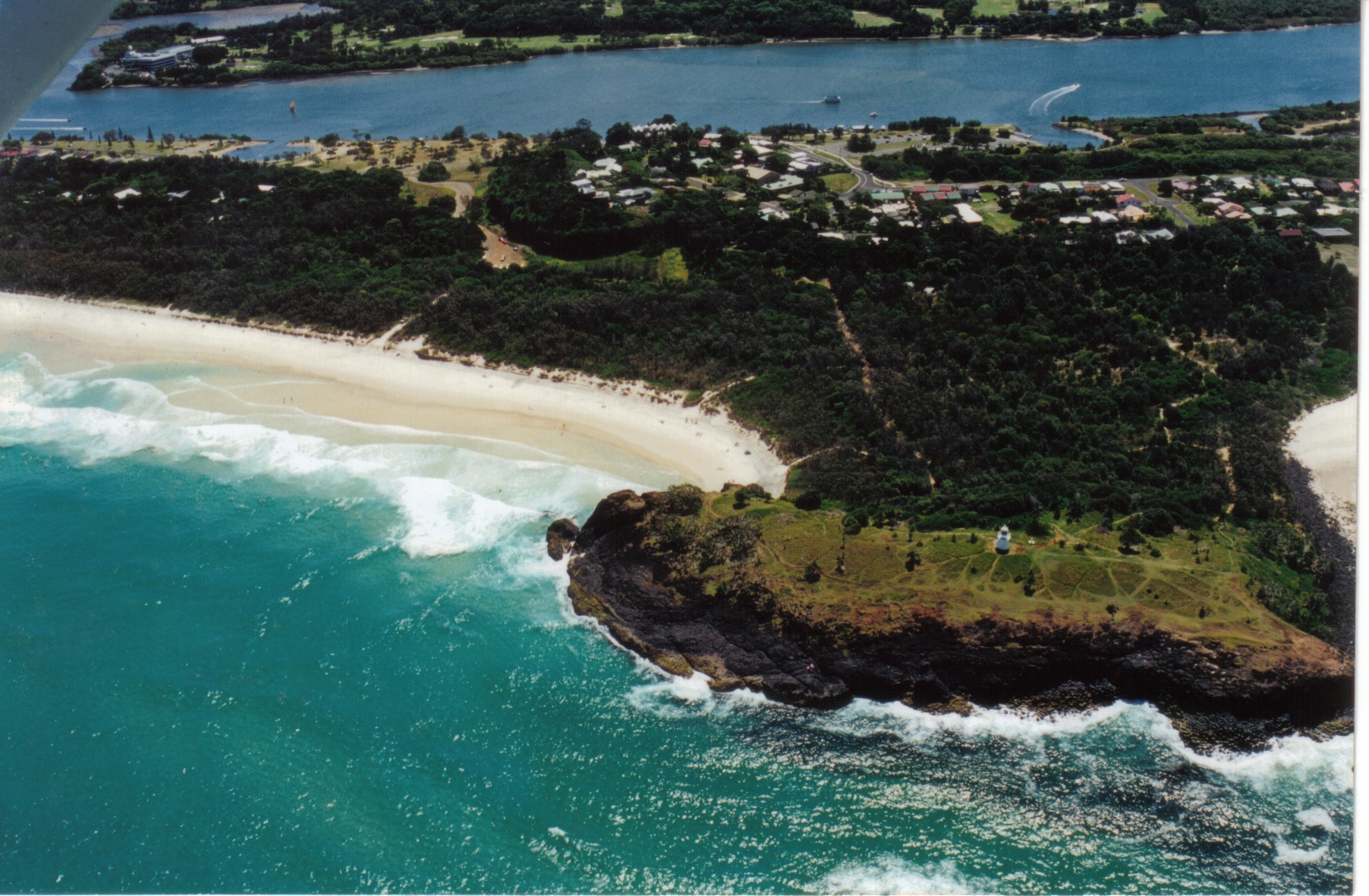
- Fingal Headland and the Tweed River

- Coordinates: 28°12′10″S 153°34′00″E
- Country: Australia
- State: New South Wales
- Region: North Coast
- LGA: Tweed Shire

Population
  - Total: 615 (2021)

Fingal Head is a village on the Tasman Sea coast in the far northeast of New South Wales, Australia, about 5 km south of the New South Wales and Queensland border. The village is often just called Fingal. The headland and the small off-shore Island (Cook Island) were first sighted by James Cook about 17:00 on 16 May 1770 (log date and time).

At the time of the 2021 census, Fingal Head had a population of 592 people. Fingal Head has become associated with The Big Lez Show, where it is based on.

The Ngandowal and Minyungbal speaking people of the Bundjalung people are the traditional owners of the Tweed region, including Fingal Head, and the surrounding areas.

== Geography ==
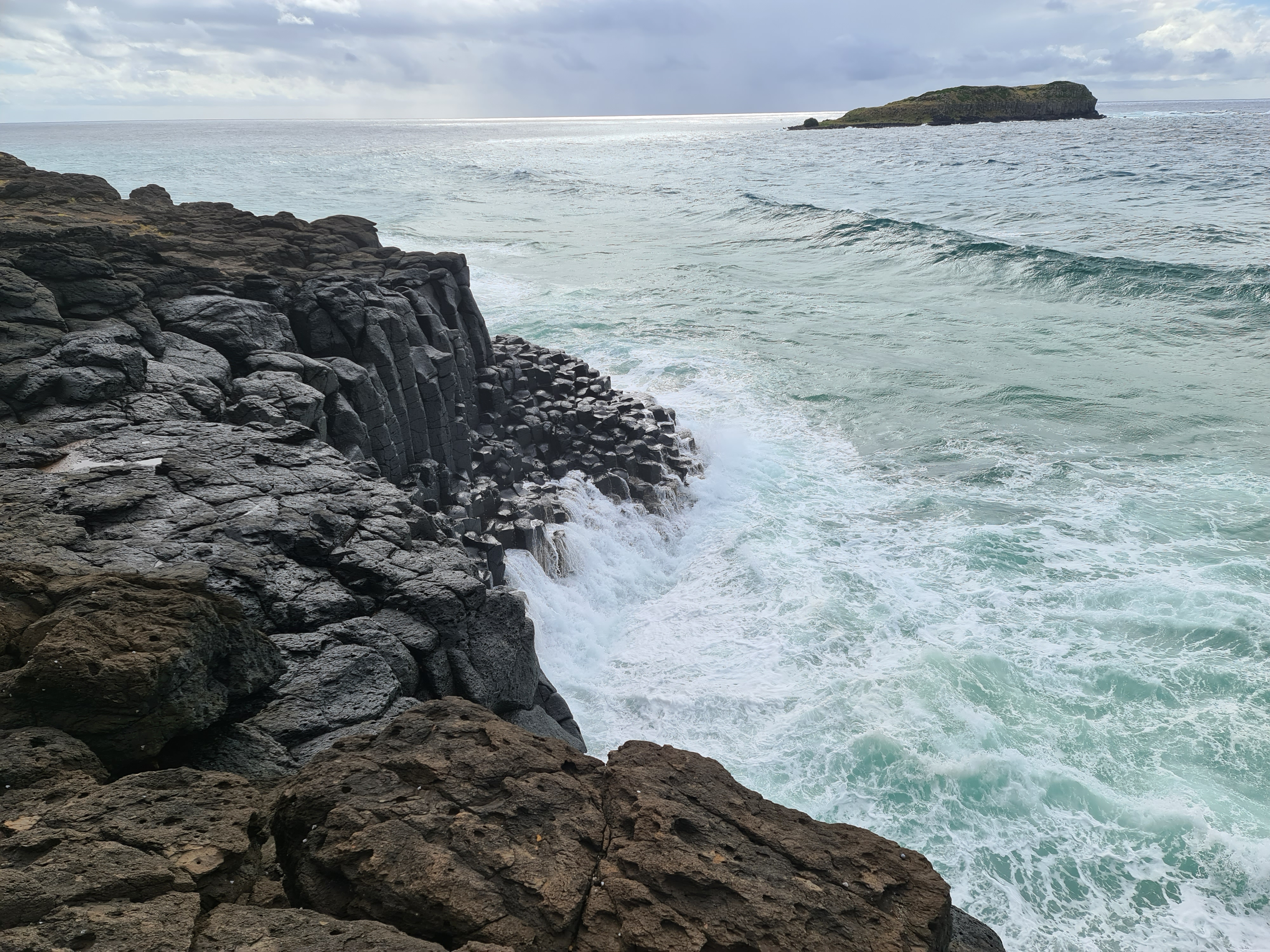
Basalt columns, 2021

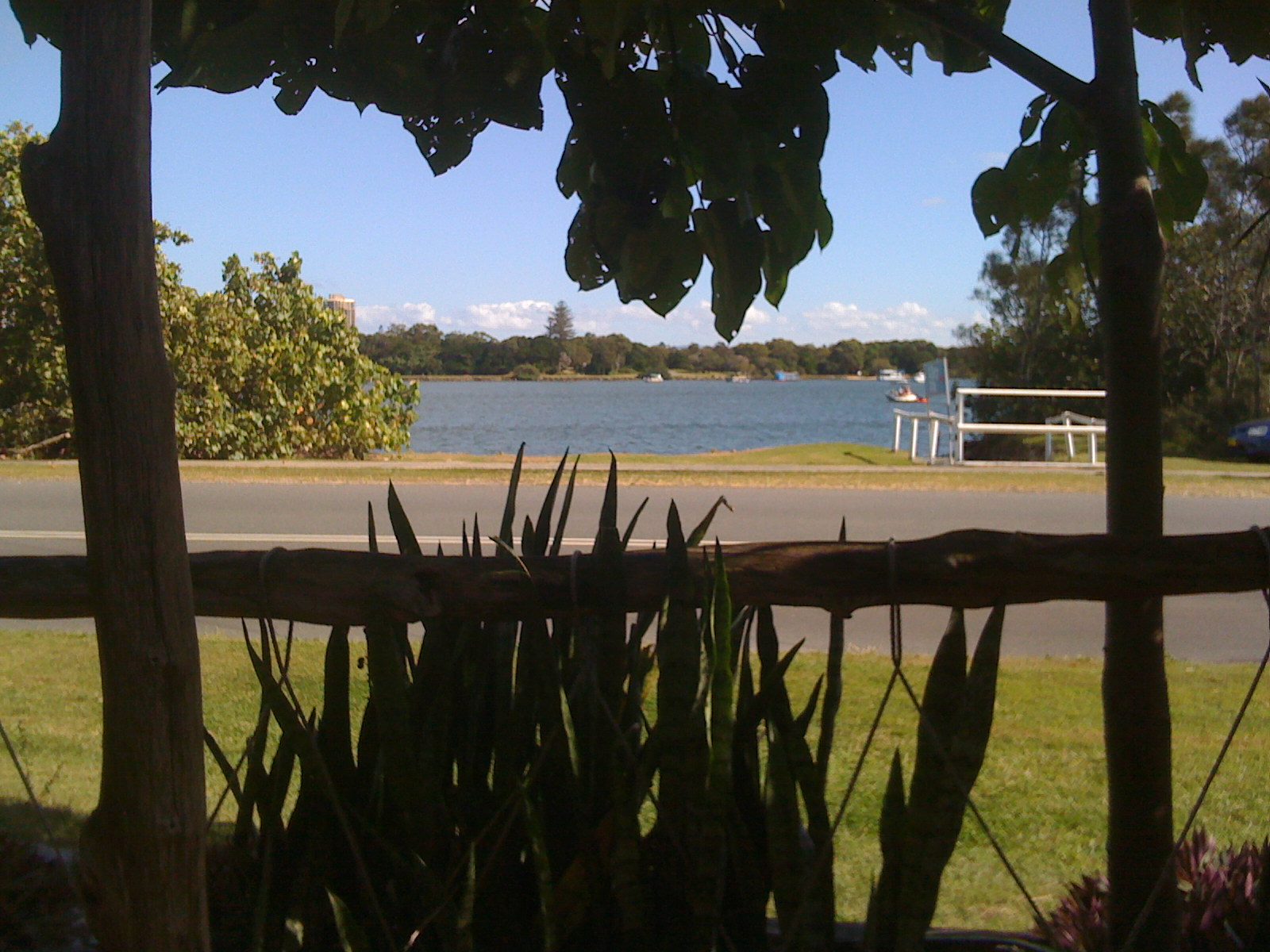
Tweed River viewed from Fingal, New South Wales, 2009

The Tweed River, (named by John Oxley in October 1823) on the north coast of New South Wales runs northwards close to the coast for about 6 km before reaching its mouth just south of present-day Point Danger. A spit about 500–800 metres wide called "Letitia Spit" (named after the first ship to enter the river in July 1840) runs south for 2 km to Fingal Head. Longshore drift moves 500,000 cubic metres of sand per year northwards past Letitia Spit. The sand would fill the Tweed River entrance unpredictably and sometimes completely. In response the New South Wales government implemented the Tweed Sand Bypassing to transport sand under the river by pump on to northern beaches.

The headland, Cook Island and the Danger Reefs, were made from a lava flow from the now extinct Tweed Volcano. The rock composition in the area is mainly basalt or andesite. There are walking tracks all over this area. About 500 metres offshore from the headland is Cook Island, a rocky uninhabited island first charted by James Cook in 1770. The interlocking basalt columns on the north-east side of Fingal Head were called the "Giants Causeway", named after the famous Giant's Causeway between Northern Ireland and Western Scotland. The Fingal Caves located on the south side of Fingal Head, were destroyed and used in the early 1900s for the Tweed Break water. Cook Island was made a marine reserve in 1998 and as such fishing is prohibited in the waters nearby.

== History ==
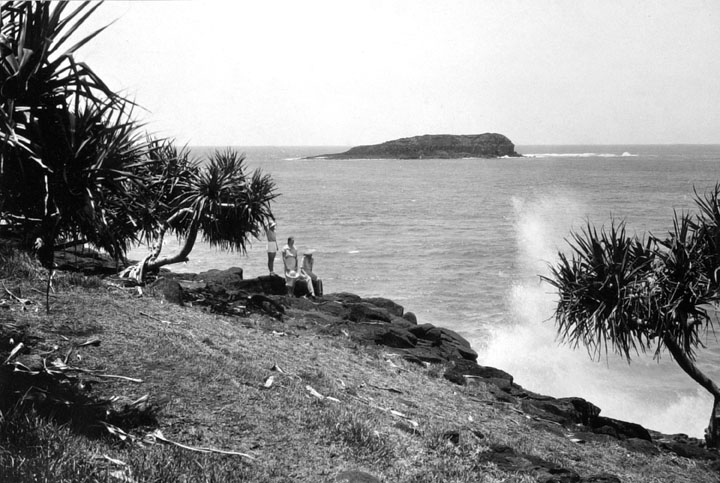
View from Fingal Head, circa 1934

There has been controversy over the naming of Fingal Head by James Cook in May 1770 for many years. Strong evidence suggests that Fingal Head was, in fact, the point James Cook named Point Danger.

In 1823, John Oxley took shelter from Southerly winds, while sailing North from Port Macquarie.

"At 3 made sail intending to anchor to the South of Point Danger. At 5 passed close to a Bold Headland [Present-day Point Danger] about 3 Miles North of Pt.D. (Point Danger). On the South Side of this headland we had the satisfaction to discover a considerable river with an apparent clear entrance." (Tweed River)

John Uniack and later Oxley went onto the island, where they found some sea turtles and called the island "Turtle Island". In 1828 Henry John Rous (Captain of HMS Rainbow) surveyed Oxley's Tweed River, the name used today. A chart published in 1831 by the Master of the "Rainbow" showing the island as "Cook's Isle" and the river named the "Clarance River" - the unnamed headland, North of the river was also named Point Danger. However the off-shore reefs East of the Island were not marked. Fingal Head would be named as such by Surveyor Robert Dixon who mapped the coastal districts between Brisbane Town and the Brunswick River in the winter months of 1840. It first appears on a map published By Dixon in Sydney in 1842. Dixon's party was also assisted at that time by the master and crew of the schooner Letitia, which they found had entered the Tweed. Hence the naming of Letitia Point. There is also every suggestion that Dixon made reference to the Giant's Causeway. It is highly probable that "Fingal Head" was named after Fingal's Cave on the island of Staffa in the Inner Hebrides of Scotland because of the similarity in appearance due to naturally formed columnar basalt outcrops which extend above the ocean surface.

The local Aboriginal people were the Minjungbal, but white settlement significantly impacted the population in the late 19th to early 20th century. In 1933, the last full-blood Aboriginal woman on the Tweed was laid to rest in Fingal's Aboriginal cemetery following a service conducted at the mission church.

Fingal Head Post Office opened on 15 March 1912, uprated from a telegraph office opened in October 1911.

== Demographics ==
In the 2011 census, Fingal Head recorded a population of 544 people, 48% female and 52% male.

The median age of the Fingal Head population was 42 years, 5 years above the national median of 37.

77% of people living in Fingal Head were born in Australia. The other top responses for country of birth were England 3.1%, New Zealand 2.8%, Hong Kong 0.6%, Germany 0.6%, Czech Republic 0.6%.

88.8% of people spoke only English at home; the next most common languages were 0.6% Bandjalang, 0.6% Italian, 0.6% Gumbaynggir, 0.6% Czech.

== Lighthouse ==
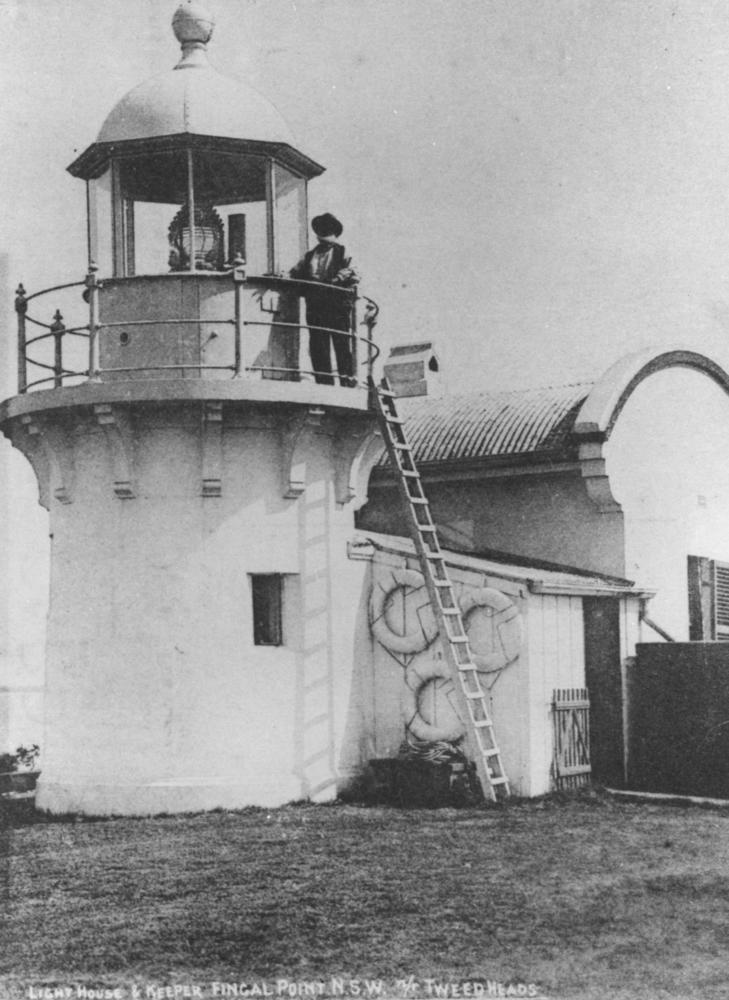
Fingal Head Light with keeper, circa 1906

A provisional light station was established on the head in 1872 and in 1878 a proper lighthouse, built as a sandstone construction in a round design, was inaugurated. It was part of a series of five such lighthouses established between 1878 and 1880. The tower stands only seven metres high, but that suffices since the headland itself adds additional height. Thus the focal plane of the lightsource is situated 24 m above sea level. In 1920 the lightsource was changed from kerosene to acetylene and became automated. It was electrified in 1980. The light characteristic is a single flash every five seconds. Depending on the bearing, red light is shown in the east sector while the other sectors show white.

== Surfing ==
Since 1996 Fingal has hosted an annual surfing competition for Indigenous surfers. The first year attracted 90 surfers from across Australia. In 1999, SBS television commissioned a documentary called Surfing the Healing Wave about that competition, as part of an Unfinished Business - Reconciling the Nation series. It won Best Australian Documentary at the 2000 Real Life on Film Festival.

Fingal is not particularly noted as a surf spot as such. The headland does not form a point break on either side, so it is just beach breaks that occur there, but the southern side is one of the few places near the Gold Coast with any protection from northerly winds.

== See also ==
- List of Irish place names in other countries
- List of places with columnar jointed volcanics
