= Hemiscyllium dudgeonae =

Scientific classification
- Kingdom: Animalia
- Phylum: Chordata
- Class: Chondrichthyes
- Subclass: Elasmobranchii
- Division: Selachii
- Order: Orectolobiformes
- Family: Hemiscylliidae
- Genus: Hemiscyllium
- Species: H. dudgeonae

Binomial name
- Hemiscyllium dudgeonae Blakeway, 2026

Species of carpet shark

Hemiscyllium dudgeonae, also known as kadedekedewa or Dudgeon's walking shark, is a species of carpet shark that belongs to the family Hemiscylliidae (bamboo shark). This species is endemic to southeastern Papua New Guinea.

The local name for the shark, kadedekedewa, loosely translates to "dog shark" or "lazy shark". The species' formal name is after the researcher who discovered it, Christine Dudgeon from the University of the Sunshine Coast located in Queensland, Australia.

Dudgeon's walking shark has a slender body and tail, tapering posteriorly. Its head and body are covered in brown freckling, interspersed with white spots and white dashes. They trail off toward the tail. There are a pair of larger brown spots just behind and below the spiracle. In addition to the distinct pattern, it is also distinguishable through DNA sequencing and geographic location.

As of 2026, it is the tenth "walking shark", or epaulette shark, discovered. It is likely that this species is highly threatened.
