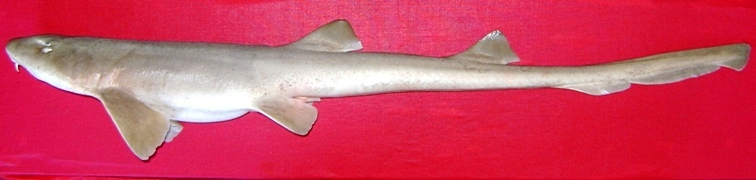

Conservation status
- Near Threatened (IUCN 3.1)

Scientific classification
- Kingdom: Animalia
- Phylum: Chordata
- Class: Chondrichthyes
- Subclass: Elasmobranchii
- Division: Selachii
- Order: Orectolobiformes
- Family: Hemiscylliidae
- Genus: Chiloscyllium
- Species: C. arabicum

Binomial name
- Chiloscyllium arabicum Gubanov, 1980
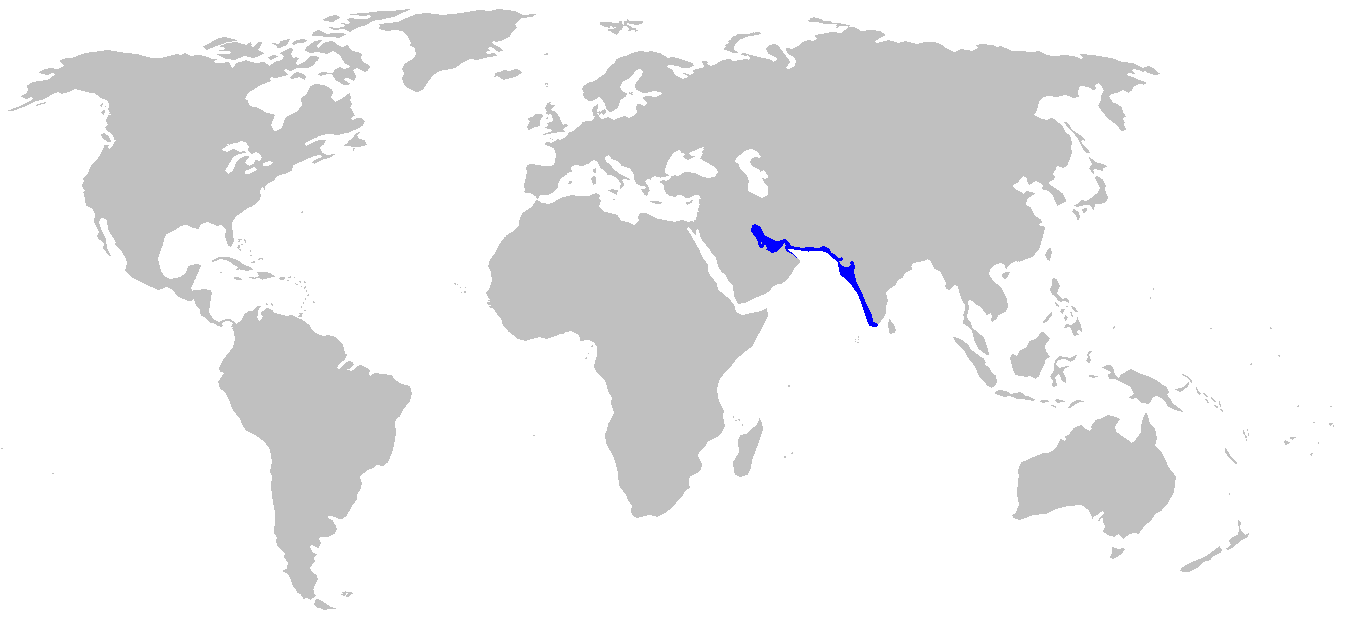
- Range of the Arabian carpetshark

Synonyms
- Chiloscyllium confusum Dingerkus & DeFino, 1983

= Arabian carpetshark =

Species of shark

The Arabian carpetshark (Chiloscyllium arabicum) is a species of carpet shark in the family Hemiscylliidae that is known for inhabiting coral reefs and other shallow shallow habitats from the Persian Gulf to the coast of India. Reaching 78 cm (31 in) long, this shark is characterized by a slender, plain brown body, and by two dorsal fins with straight trailing margins, the second being smaller but longer-based than the first. The Arabian carpetshark feeds on bony fishes and invertebrates. Reproduction is oviparous with an annual cycle; females deposit egg capsules four at a time and the young hatch after 70–80 days. This small shark is often captured as bycatch but rarely used by humans as food. It has been assessed as Near Threatened by the International Union for Conservation of Nature (IUCN), as there is increasing fishing pressure and habitat degradation within its range. It does well in aquariums and has been bred in captivity.

== Taxonomy ==
Prior to being described as a new species in Gubanov and Schleib's 1980 Sharks of the Arabian Gulf, the Arabian carpetshark was misreported as the grey bamboo shark (C. griseum); it is uncertain whether the ranges of these two similar sharks in fact overlap. No type specimens are known. Other common names for this species include Arabian bamboo shark and confusing bamboo shark.

== Distribution and habitat ==
The Arabian carpetshark inhabits coastal waters 3–100 m (9.8–328.1 ft) deep, though most are found shallower than 10 m (33 ft). Its range extends from the Persian Gulf to Pakistan and western India; it is abundant in the Persian Gulf in spring and summer, and seldom reported from Oman and India. This demersal species favors coral reefs, lagoons, rocky coastlines, and mangrove estuaries.

== Description ==
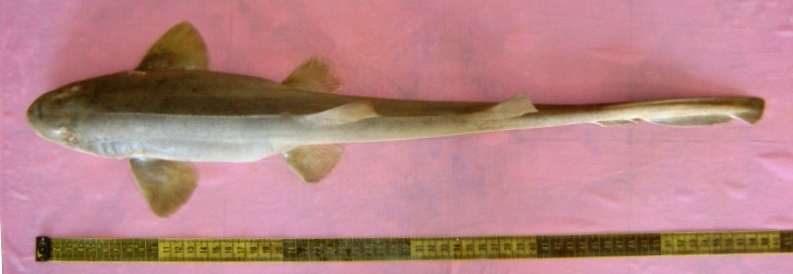
The Arabian carpetshark has a long tail and is uniformly brown in color.

The Arabian carpetshark has a slender, nearly cylindrical body and a relatively long, thick, rounded snout. The nostrils are set a good distance from the snout tip and preceded by a pair of short barbels. The eyes are medium-sized and placed high on the head, each with a low ridge above and a large spiracle behind and below. The small mouth lies well forward of the eyes; there is a continuous fold of skin across the chin that wraps around the corners of the mouth. There are 26–35 upper tooth rows and 21–32 lower tooth rows. The teeth have a large central cusp and a pair of lateral cusplets. The five pairs of gill slits are short, with the fourth and fifth pairs very close together.

The pectoral fins are small, broad, and rounded; the pelvic fins are similar and almost as large. The two dorsal fins have straight trailing margins and are spaced well apart. The first dorsal fin is as large or larger than the pelvic fins, originating behind the middle of the pelvic fin bases. The second dorsal fin is slightly smaller than the first but has a longer base. There is a prominent midline ridge along the back, which continues between the dorsal fins. The long, keel-like anal fin originates behind the second dorsal fin. The caudal fin is low and lacks a lower lobe; the upper lobe has a strong ventral notch near the tip. Adults are a plain tan color above and white below, sometimes with an orange tint on the fin margins; juveniles have faint lighter spots on the fins. This species reaches a maximum known length of 78 cm (31 in).

== Biology and ecology ==
Commonly found sheltering inside caves and crevices, the Arabian carpetshark is a predator of bony fishes (including snake eels) and invertebrates (including stomatopods, shrimp, crabs, squid, gastropods, and echiuroid worms). This hardy species can survive for some time out of water. It is oviparous like other members of its family, with a six-month breeding season. The reproductive cycle has been documented in captivity: copulation involves the male holding onto one of the female's pectoral fins with his mouth, while inserting a single clasper into her cloaca for 5–15 minutes. When competing for mates, male sharks have been known to bite the claspers of rival males. Females produce an average of 33 egg capsules per year in batches of four, that are laid over a period of 20 minutes to two days. Of those eggs, about 7% are infertile. The egg cases have adhesive tendrils for securing them to coral, and hatch in 70–80 days at a temperature of 24 °C (75 °F). Newly emerged young measure under 10 cm (3.9 in) long; sexual maturity is attained at a length of 45–54 cm (18–21 in).

== Human interactions ==
Small and harmless to humans, the Arabian carpetshark is one of the few shark species suitable for private aquaria. It is collected for the aquarium trade, which is not believed to pose a substantial threat to its population. The meat and possibly the fins of this shark can be used, but because of its size most individuals landed are discarded. It is captured incidentally in intertidal hadra (artisanal stake-net traps), as well as in demersal trammel and trawl nets. The Arabian carpetshark forms the predominant component of the "cat shark" catch of Kuwaiti prawn trawls, which represents the second-largest bycatch (14% of total) of the fishery. It is also caught off Bahrain and likely elsewhere. Another potentially major threat to this species is habitat degradation: coral reefs in the Persian Gulf face bottom trawling, coastal development (especially large-scale land reclamation projects such as in the United Arab Emirates), Turkish dams on the Tigris-Euphrates river system, draining of marshes in Iraq, and oil spills. Coastal habitats off India are also similarly pressured. As both fishing and habitat degradation are likely to intensify in the region, the International Union for Conservation of Nature (IUCN) has assessed the Arabian carpetshark as Near Threatened.
