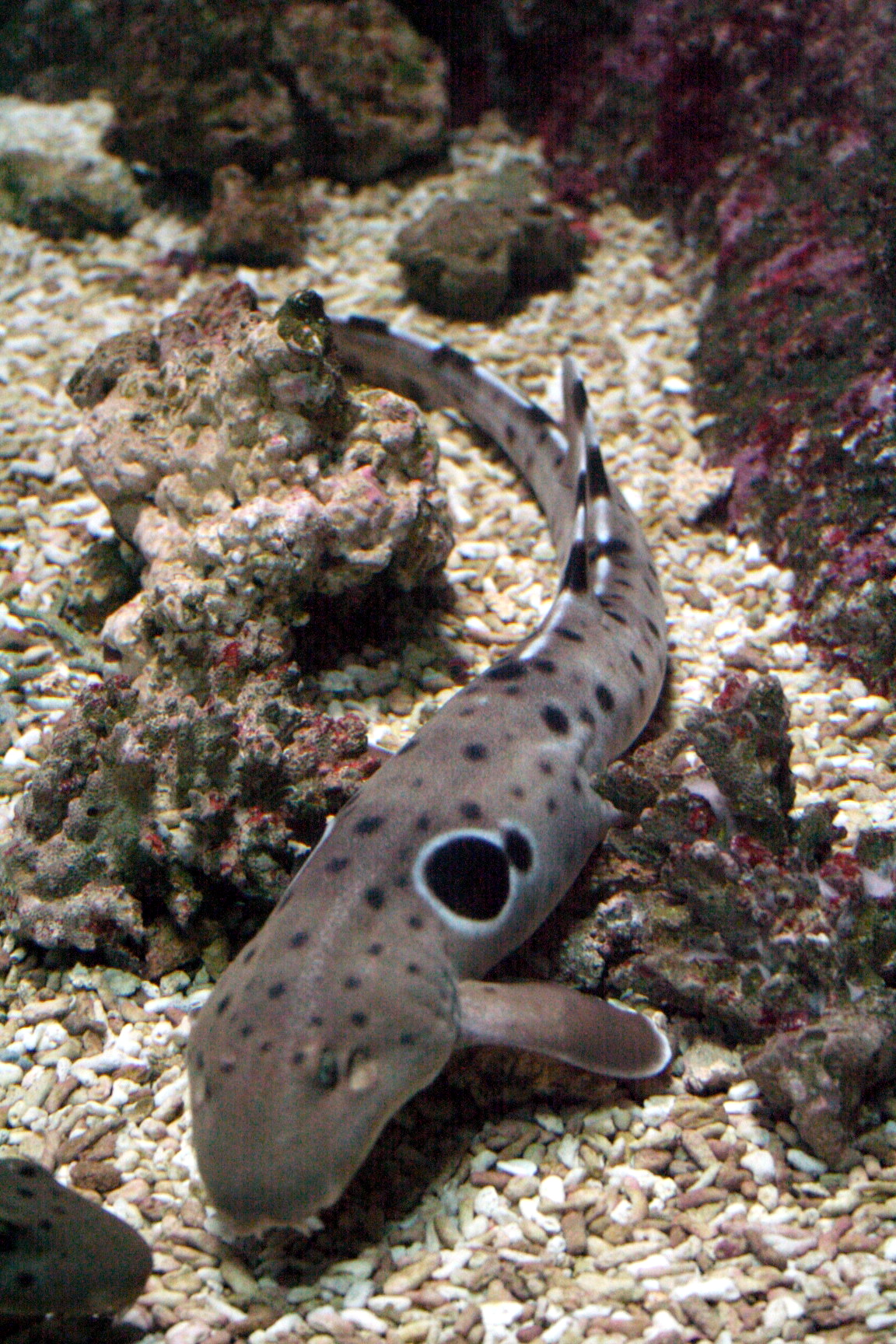
- Hemiscyllium ocellatum

Scientific classification
- Kingdom: Animalia
- Phylum: Chordata
- Class: Chondrichthyes
- Subclass: Elasmobranchii
- Division: Selachii
- Order: Orectolobiformes
- Family: Hemiscylliidae
- Genus: Hemiscyllium

Species
- See text

= Hemiscyllium =

Genus of sharks

Hemiscyllium is a genus of carpet shark in the family Hemiscylliidae (bamboo sharks).

== Overview ==
Hemiscyllium sharks of the family Hemiscylliidae are also known as walking sharks and Epaulette sharks. These small, nocturnal, benthic dwelling swimmers have evolved to be able to 'walk', or use their fins to propel themselves over rocks, into pools, or into small crevices in their habitats. Research from the School of Biomedical Sciences at the University of Queensland in Australia has determined that this genus most recently split from the genus Chiloscyllium around 44 million years ago. This genus is confined to tropical waters off Australia, Papua New Guinea, and Indonesia, but an individual from this genus, possibly representing an undescribed species, has been photographed in the Seychelles. They have short snouts with nostrils placed almost at the tip, well-elevated eyes, and supraorbital ridges. The mouth is closer to the tip of the snout than the eyes and lacks the connecting dermal fold across the chin. The pectoral and pelvic fins are thick and heavily muscular. Either a black hood on the head or a large black spot on the sides of the body is present, though juveniles often are strongly marked with dark spots/bars. This shark family can survive around two hours out of water without any internal damage, can tolerate high levels of CO_{2}, and are hypoxia and anoxia tolerant.

== Adaptations ==
Epaulette sharks live in shallow waters near reefs, tidepools or islands and are currently only found in the Western South Pacific. Epaulette sharks use their fins to crawl inside small crevices or holes while hunting for small prey and escaping larger predators. Each species in this genus also possesses a distinct black 'eye' spot behind its pectoral fins to deter predators by giving the appearance of a very large eye. Neonate and juvenile epaulette sharks are born with lighter color markings and slightly different patterns, but their colors darken as they mature, with patterns shifting to mimic its environment.

== List of species ==
Ten recognized species are in this genus:

- Hemiscyllium dudgeonae (Blakeway, 2026) (Dudgeon’s walking shark)
- Hemiscyllium freycineti (Quoy & Gaimard, 1824) (Indonesian speckled carpetshark)
- Hemiscyllium galei G. R. Allen & Erdmann, 2008 (Cenderawasih epaulette shark)
- Hemiscyllium hallstromi Whitley, 1967 (Papuan epaulette shark)
- Hemiscyllium halmahera G. R. Allen, Erdmann & Dudgeon, 2013 (Halmahera epaulette shark)
- Hemiscyllium henryi G. R. Allen & Erdmann, 2008 (Henry's epaulette shark)
- Hemiscyllium michaeli G. R. Allen & Dudgeon, 2010 (Milne Bay epaulette shark)
- Hemiscyllium ocellatum (Bonnaterre, 1788) (epaulette shark)
- Hemiscyllium strahani Whitley, 1967 (hooded carpetshark)
- Hemiscyllium trispeculare J. Richardson, 1843 (speckled carpetshark)
