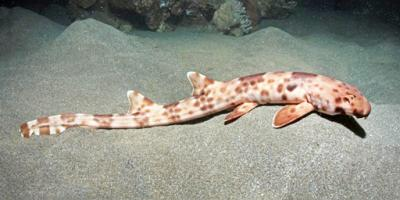

Conservation status
- Near Threatened (IUCN 3.1)

Scientific classification
- Kingdom: Animalia
- Phylum: Chordata
- Class: Chondrichthyes
- Subclass: Elasmobranchii
- Division: Selachii
- Order: Orectolobiformes
- Family: Hemiscylliidae
- Genus: Hemiscyllium
- Species: H. halmahera

Binomial name
- Hemiscyllium halmahera G. R. Allen, Erdmann & Dudgeon, 2013
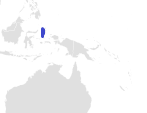
- Known range of the Halmahera epaulette shark (in blue)

= Hemiscyllium halmahera =

Species of shark

Hemiscyllium halmahera, or the Halmahera epaulette shark, is a species of bamboo shark from Indonesia. This species is described from two specimens collected near Ternate island in 2013, off the coast of larger Halmahera island. This species is most similar to Hemiscyllium galei, found in West Papua, but looks strikingly different in its pattern of spots. While H. galei has seven large, dark spots on each side of its body, H. halmahera has a brown color with clusters of brown or white spots in polygon configurations all over its body. These small sharks are like other bamboo sharks, in that they use their pectoral fins to "walk" along the ocean floor.

== Etymology ==
The shark is named for Halmahera, Indonesia, the type locality where the fish was collected.
