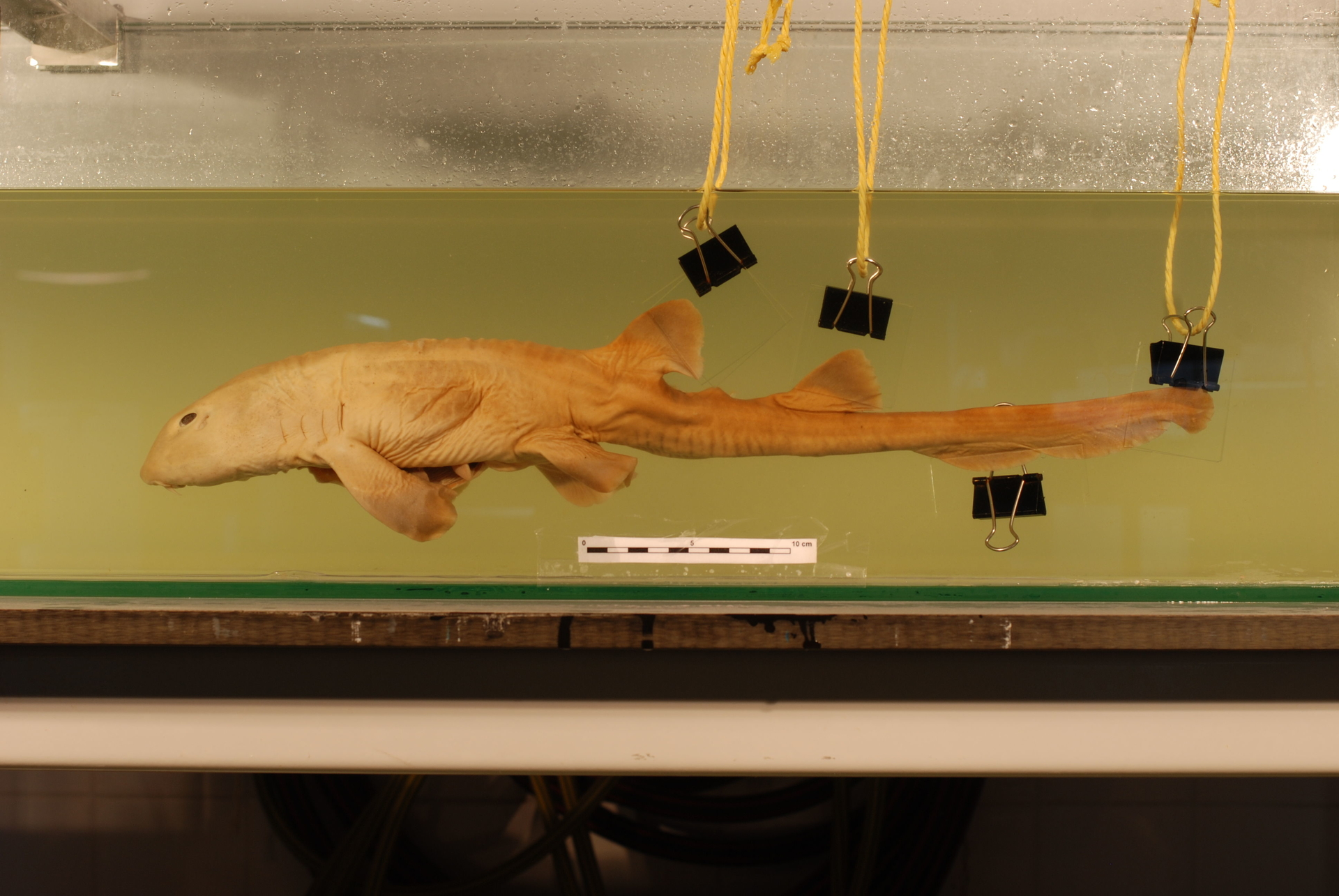

Conservation status
- Endangered (IUCN 3.1)

Scientific classification
- Kingdom: Animalia
- Phylum: Chordata
- Class: Chondrichthyes
- Subclass: Elasmobranchii
- Division: Selachii
- Order: Orectolobiformes
- Family: Hemiscylliidae
- Genus: Chiloscyllium
- Species: C. hasseltii

Binomial name
- Chiloscyllium hasseltii Bleeker, 1852
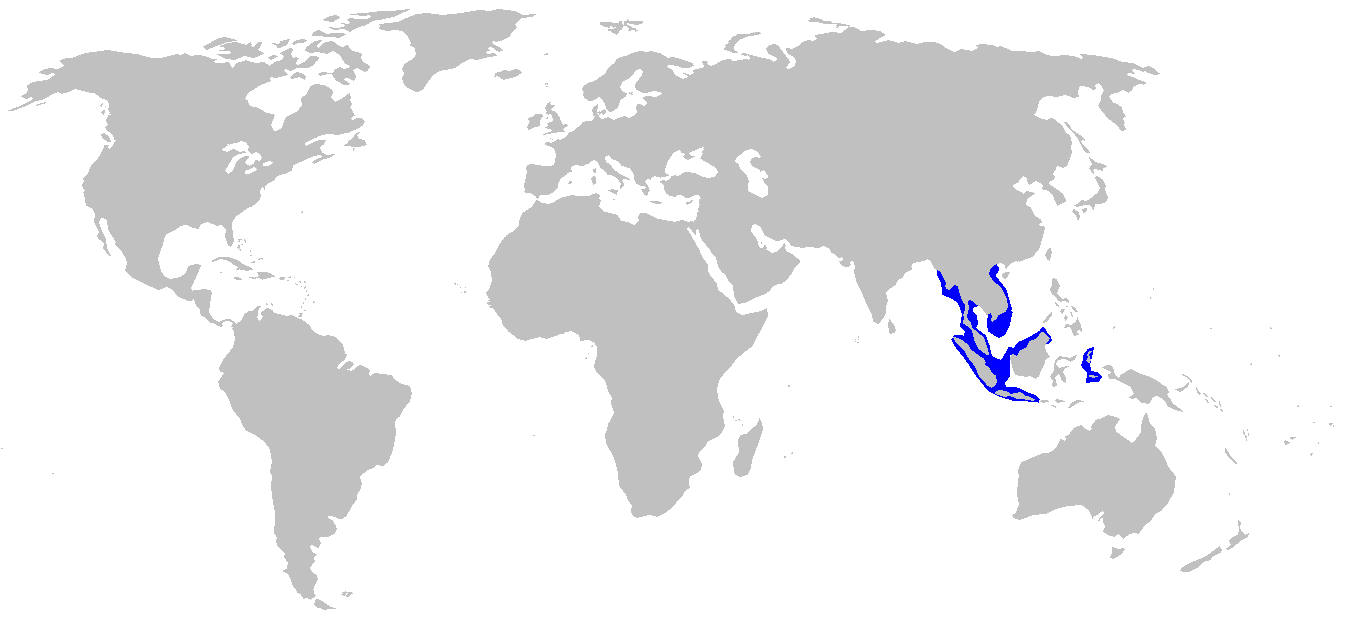

= Hasselt's bamboo shark =

Species of shark

Hasselt's bamboo shark (Chiloscyllium hasseltii) is a bamboo shark in the family Hemiscylliidae found around Thailand, Malaysia and Indonesia, between latitudes 23° N and 10° S, and longitude 91° E and 133° E; residing inshore. Its length is up to 60 cm.

Features: Much like C. punctatum, adults usually have no color patterns, but the juveniles have transverse dark bands with black edging.

Reproduction: These sharks are oviparous. The eggs will attach to benthic marine plants and hatch in December. Their average size at hatching is 94 to 120 mm.

== See also ==
- List of sharks
- Carpet shark
