= Burmese bamboo shark =

Conservation status
- Vulnerable (IUCN 3.1)

Scientific classification
- Kingdom: Animalia
- Phylum: Chordata
- Class: Chondrichthyes
- Subclass: Elasmobranchii
- Division: Selachii
- Order: Orectolobiformes
- Family: Hemiscylliidae
- Genus: Chiloscyllium
- Species: C. burmensis

Binomial name
- Chiloscyllium burmensis Dingerkus & DeFino, 1983
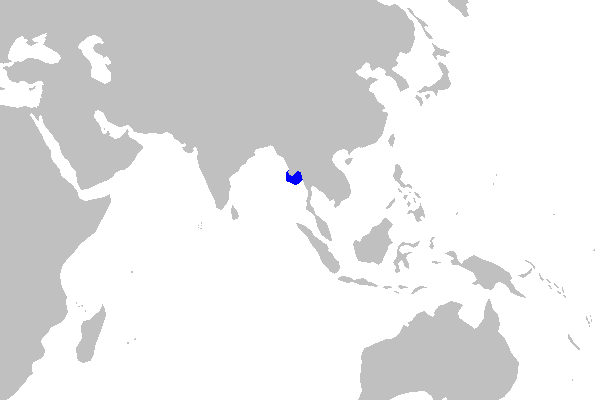
- Range of the Burmese bamboo shark (in blue)

Species of shark

The Burmese bamboo shark, Chiloscyllium burmensis, is an extremely rare bamboo shark in the family Hemiscylliidae. The first specimen was caught in 1963 off the coast from Rangoon in Myanmar (known as Burma at the time) in a depth of 29–33 m (95–108 ft). This holotype is an adult male, 57 cm (22 in) long and kept in the National Museum of Natural History, Smithsonian Institution, Washington, DC. Later, three more specimens, two males and one female, were recorded in 2018 from the Bangladesh Fisheries Development Corporation Fish Landing Center of Cox's Bazar.

== Description ==
The dorsal fin of the Burmese bamboo shark has straight rear margins. They are relatively small in size and have a slender body, blunt snout, and small eyes. It has no particular color pattern.

== Diet ==
They eat small bony fish or invertebrates.

== Reproduction ==
The Burmese bamboo shark is oviparous (egg laying), notedly laying eggs in pairs.

== See also ==
- List of sharks
