= Adnetoscyllium =

Adnetoscyllium Temporal range: Santonian–Campanian

Scientific classification
- Domain: Eukaryota
- Kingdom: Animalia
- Phylum: Chordata
- Class: Chondrichthyes
- Subclass: Elasmobranchii
- Division: Selachii
- Order: Orectolobiformes
- Family: Hemiscylliidae
- Genus: †Adnetoscyllium; Guinot, Underwood, Cappetta & Ward, 2013
- Species: †A. angloparisensis

Binomial name
- †Adnetoscyllium angloparisensis Guinot, Underwood, Cappetta & Ward, 2013

Extinct genus of bamboo shark

Adnetoscyllium is an extinct genus of bamboo shark from the Cretaceous period. It is currently monotypic, containing only the species A. angloparisensis. The genus is named for prominent paleoichthyologist, Dr. Sylvain Adnet. The specific epithet refers to the range which is thus far restricted to the Anglo-Paris Basin of France and the United Kingdom.

It has a range starting in the Santonian and ending in the Campanian though some fragmentary older teeth likely from this species are known. It can be told apart from most other related genera via its lack of lateral cusplets.
