= Hemiscyllium galei =

Conservation status
- Vulnerable (IUCN 3.1)

Scientific classification
- Kingdom: Animalia
- Phylum: Chordata
- Class: Chondrichthyes
- Subclass: Elasmobranchii
- Division: Selachii
- Order: Orectolobiformes
- Family: Hemiscylliidae
- Genus: Hemiscyllium
- Species: H. galei

Binomial name
- Hemiscyllium galei G. R. Allen & Erdmann, 2008
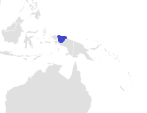
- Range of the Cenderwasih epaulette shark

Species of shark

Hemiscyllium galei, the Cenderawasih epaulette shark, is a species of bamboo shark in the family Hemiscylliidae. Together with H. henryi, it was only scientifically described in 2008 by Gerald R. Allen and Mark van Nydeck Erdmann. At present, H. galei is only known from depths of 2 to 4 metres (6 ft 7 in to 13 ft 1 in) at reefs in the Cenderawasih Bay in West Papua, Indonesia. The largest known specimen was 56.8 centimetres (22.4 in) long. It can be separated from its relatives (e.g., H. freycineti) by the combination of seven relatively large dark spots along the side of the body (between the abdomen and tail-base), white markings on the edge of its dark dorsal saddles and other scattered white spots on the upper side.

== Etymology ==
The shark is named in honor of underwater photographer and shark enthusiast Jeffrey Gale, who bid successfully to help conserve the species at a charity auction, and who then financially supported Conservation International's efforts to preserve its habitat.
