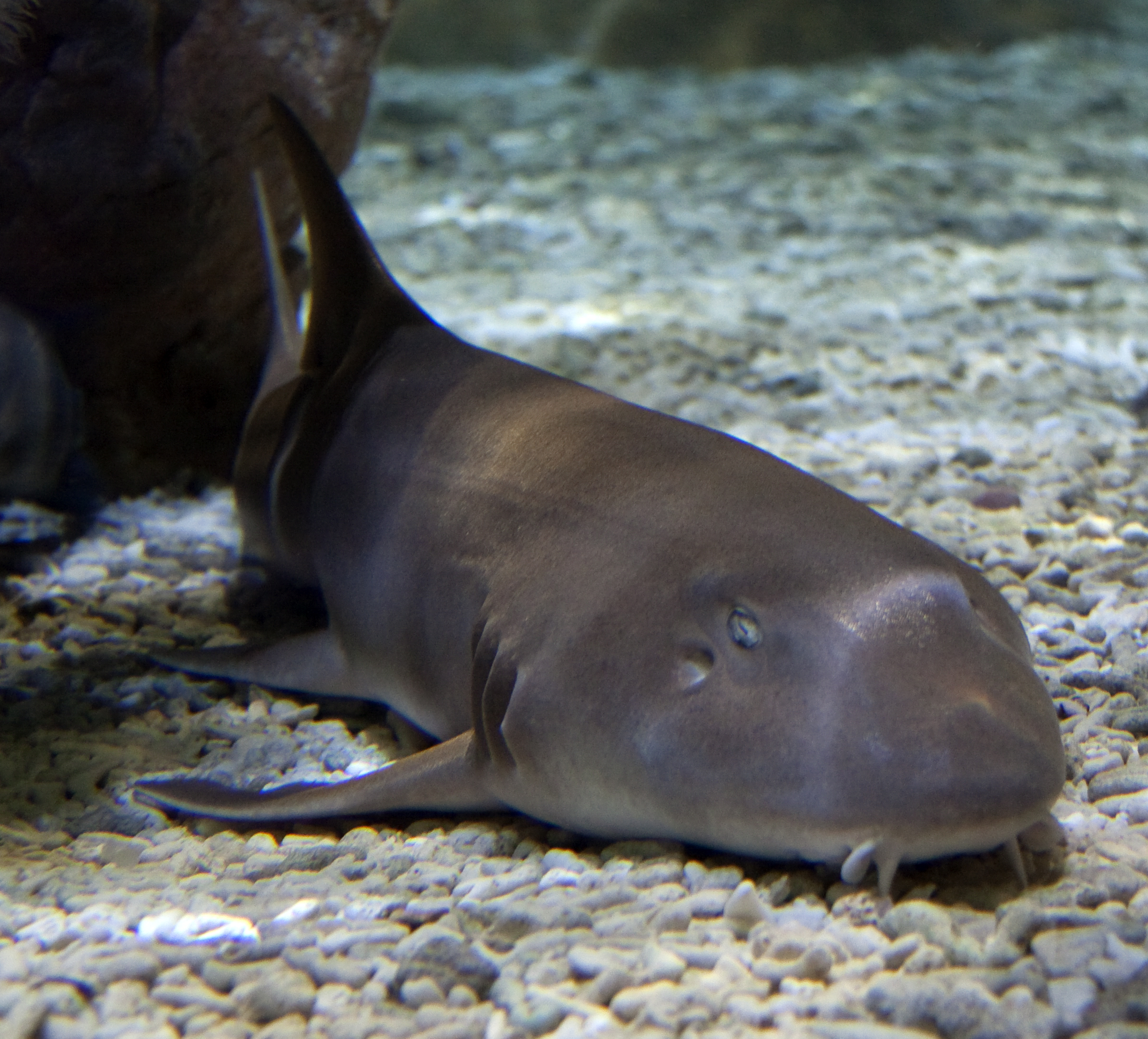

Conservation status
- Near Threatened (IUCN 3.1)

Scientific classification
- Kingdom: Animalia
- Phylum: Chordata
- Class: Chondrichthyes
- Subclass: Elasmobranchii
- Division: Selachii
- Order: Orectolobiformes
- Family: Hemiscylliidae
- Genus: Chiloscyllium
- Species: C. punctatum

Binomial name
- Chiloscyllium punctatum J. P. Müller & Henle, 1838
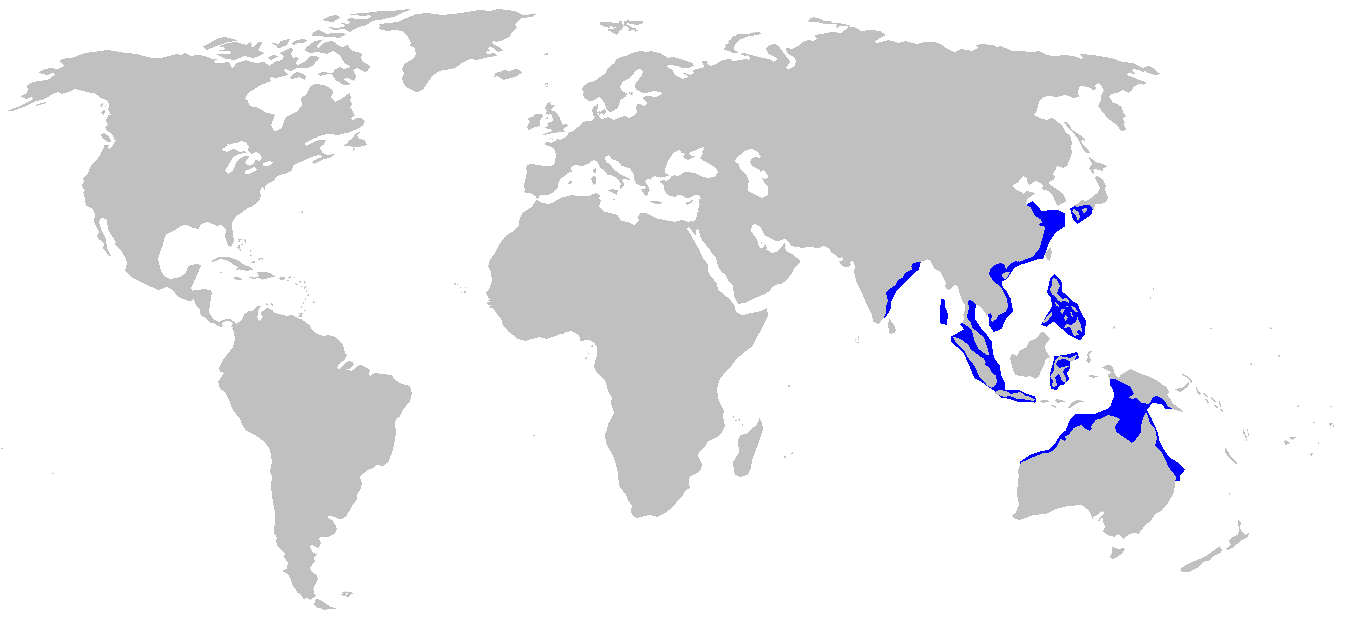
- Range of the brownbanded bamboo shark

= Brownbanded bamboo shark =

Species of shark

The brownbanded bamboo shark (Chiloscyllium punctatum), is a bamboo shark in the family Hemiscylliidae that can be found in the Indo-West Pacific from Japan to northern Australia, between latitudes 34° N and 26° S. It is regularly bred in public aquaria, and is arguably one of the sharks most suited to captivity due to its docile disposition, sedentary nature, and relatively small size. In public aquariums, these fish can live up to 25 years.

Brownbanded bamboo shark embryos

== Features ==
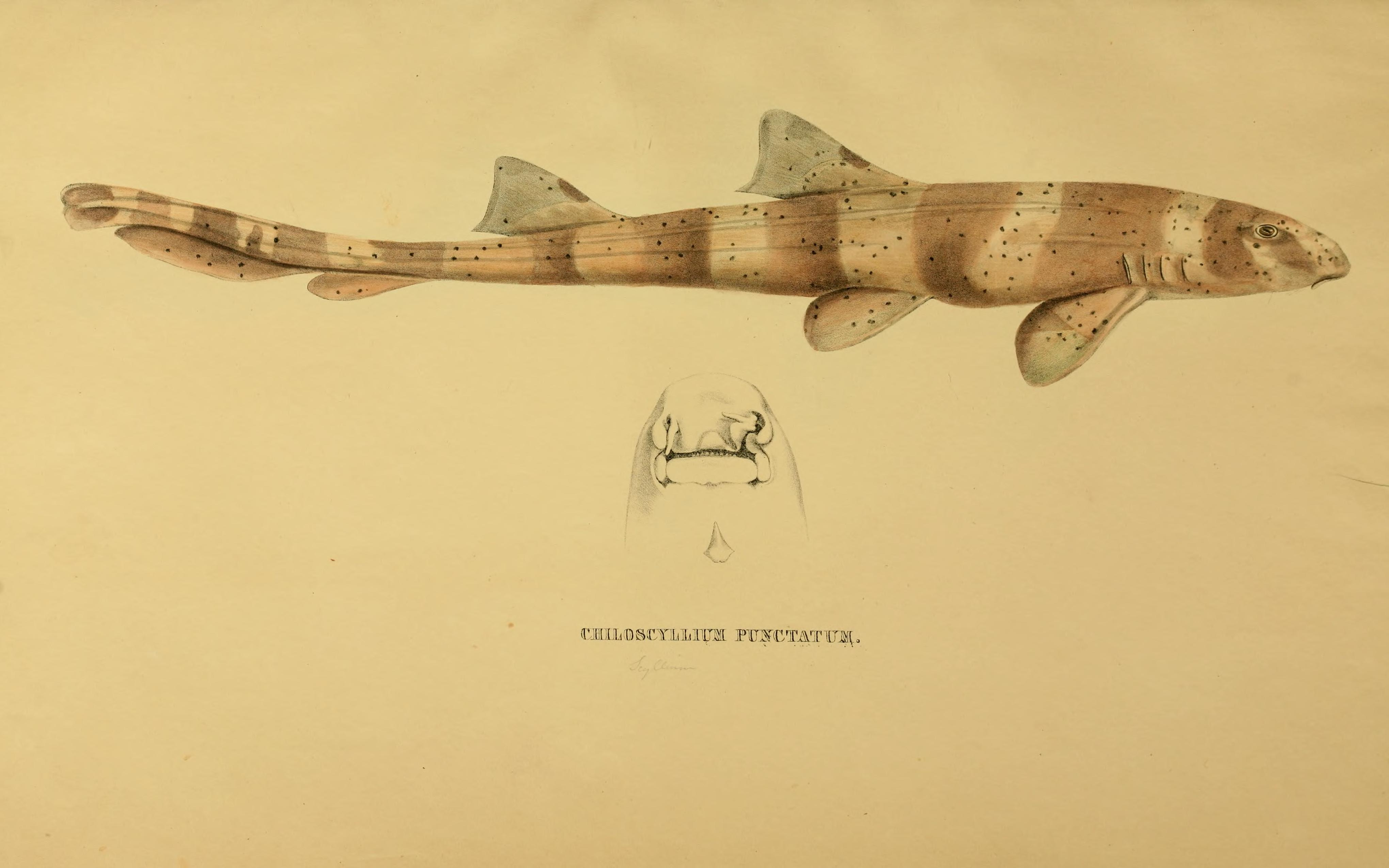
Illustration of adult shark

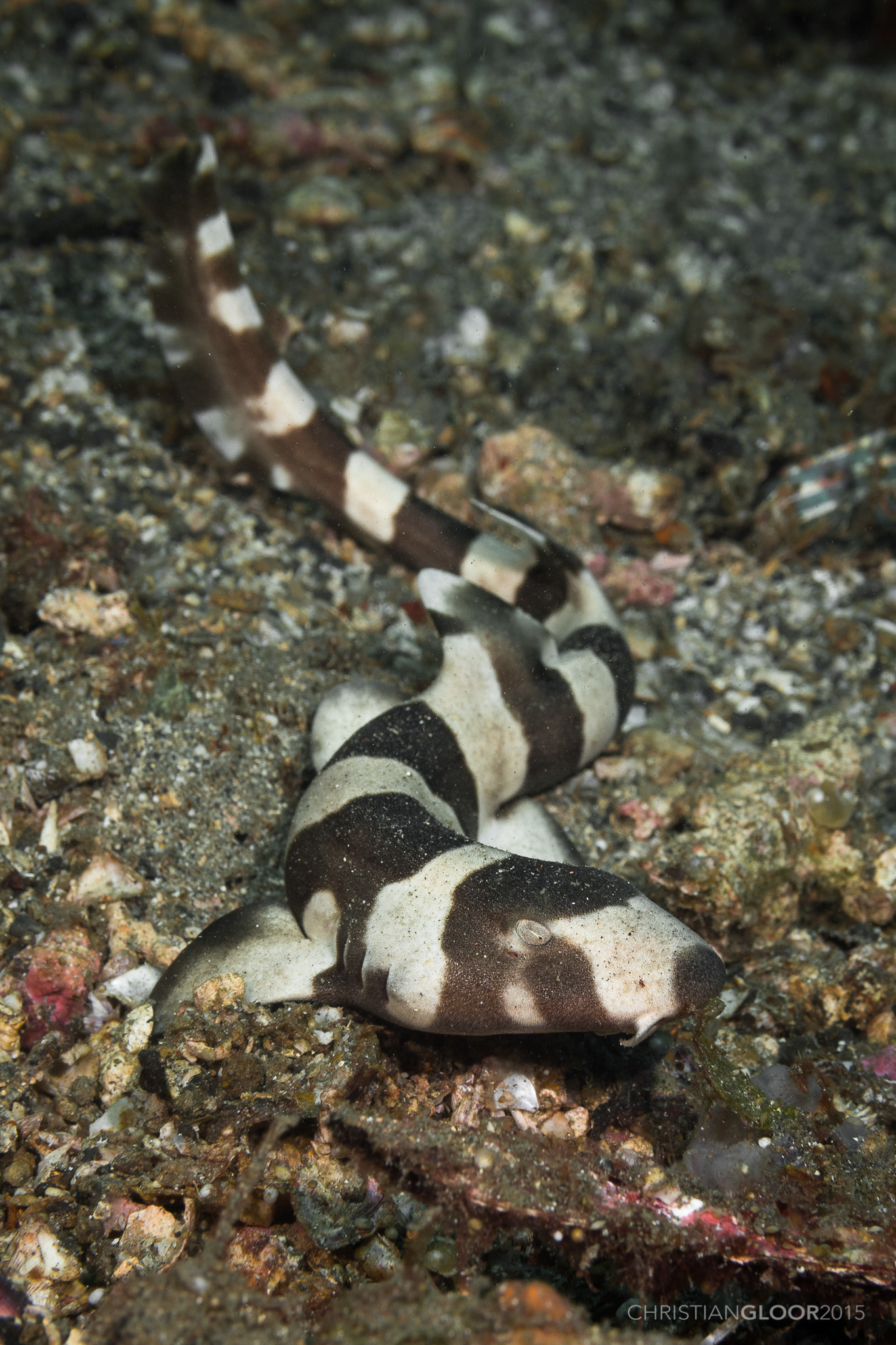
Juvenile

These sharks can be distinguished by their concave posterior margined dorsal fin. No color patterns are present for the adults, however, the juveniles have dark transverse bands with some dark spots. It can grow up to 1.04 metres (41 in).

It is a nocturnal animal and can survive out of the water for up to 12 hrs. They have barbels that resemble feline whiskers, hence the common name "cat shark". Despite this moniker, they are not true members of the catshark family, and are more closely related to the nurse sharks, wobbegongs, epaulette sharks and whale sharks, belonging to the order Orectolobiformes.

== Habitat ==
These sharks live around coral reefs and tide pools. It resides at depths down to 85 metres (279 ft).

== Sharks as pets ==
The minimum size of the tank that can carry an adult cat shark is about 180 gallons. Because these sharks are nocturnal, they will need some type of shaded area within the tank where the shark could hide. Although these sharks do not swim around too much, it is highly suggested that the items within the tank should be stable; brownbanded bamboo sharks are very strong and will knock down anything that is not stable inside the tank. Also this shark should not be placed with triggers and puffers; they will nip at the shark's fins, nor should they be placed with aggressive feeders.

== Reproduction ==
It reproduces oviparously.

== Feeding ==
These sharks are carnivores that should be fed 2–3 times a week; some of their diet includes fresh shrimp, scallop, squid, and marine fishes. In order to prevent goiter disease, they should take iodine supplements. Two things to be aware of when feeding the shark: one is to make sure that the meals are bite sized or else it will throw it back up and the second is sometimes juveniles are difficult to get to eat so adding a flavor enhances their interest .

== DNA ==
In 2018, a group led by Shigehiro Kuraku published a draft assembly of the genome sequence of the brown-banded bamboo shark in the journal Nature Ecology & Evolution. In this study, the brown-banded bamboo shark genome was sequenced and assembled using DNA samples provided by a Japanese aquarium, Osaka Aquarium Kaiyukan. It was sequenced using Illumina sequencing technology and assembled using a short read genome assembler. According to their analysis, the genome size is estimated to be 4.7 giga base-pairs.

The slow molecular evolutionary rate of elasmobranchs (sharks, rays and skates) has been reported repeatedly. Despite such slow evolutionary nature, it was once reported that elasmobranchs probably lost HoxC cluster, one of the four Hox gene clusters. However, the genome sequence of the brown-banded bamboo shark revealed the existence of several Hoxc genes.

== Threats ==
Its minimum population doubling is in the 4.5–14 years range. The major threats to these sharks are the loss of their habitat, pollution, and capture (both for aquarium trade as well as food).

== In popular culture ==
The main protagonist of the 2012 Malaysian animated feature film SeeFood is a talking, sentient young brownbanded bamboo shark named Pup, whose ability to breathe on land plays a major role in the plot.

== See also ==
- List of sharks
