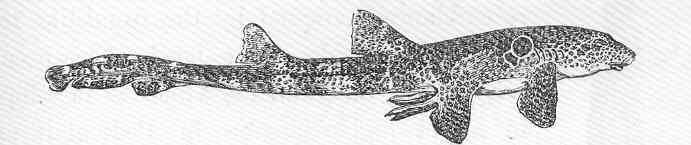

Conservation status
- Least Concern (IUCN 3.1)

Scientific classification
- Kingdom: Animalia
- Phylum: Chordata
- Class: Chondrichthyes
- Subclass: Elasmobranchii
- Division: Selachii
- Order: Orectolobiformes
- Family: Hemiscylliidae
- Genus: Hemiscyllium
- Species: H. trispeculare

Binomial name
- Hemiscyllium trispeculare J. Richardson, 1843
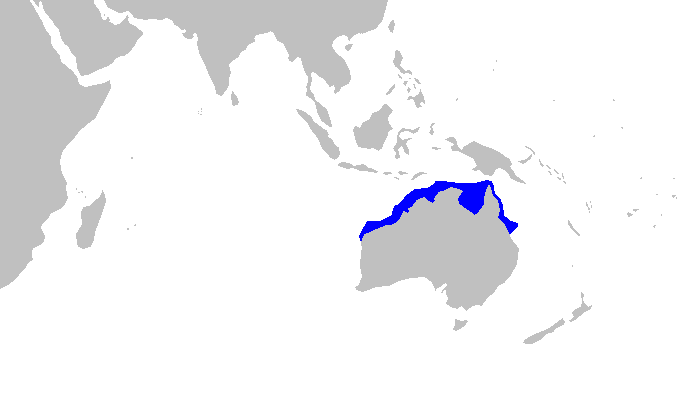
- Range of speckled carpetshark (in blue)

= Speckled carpetshark =

Species of shark

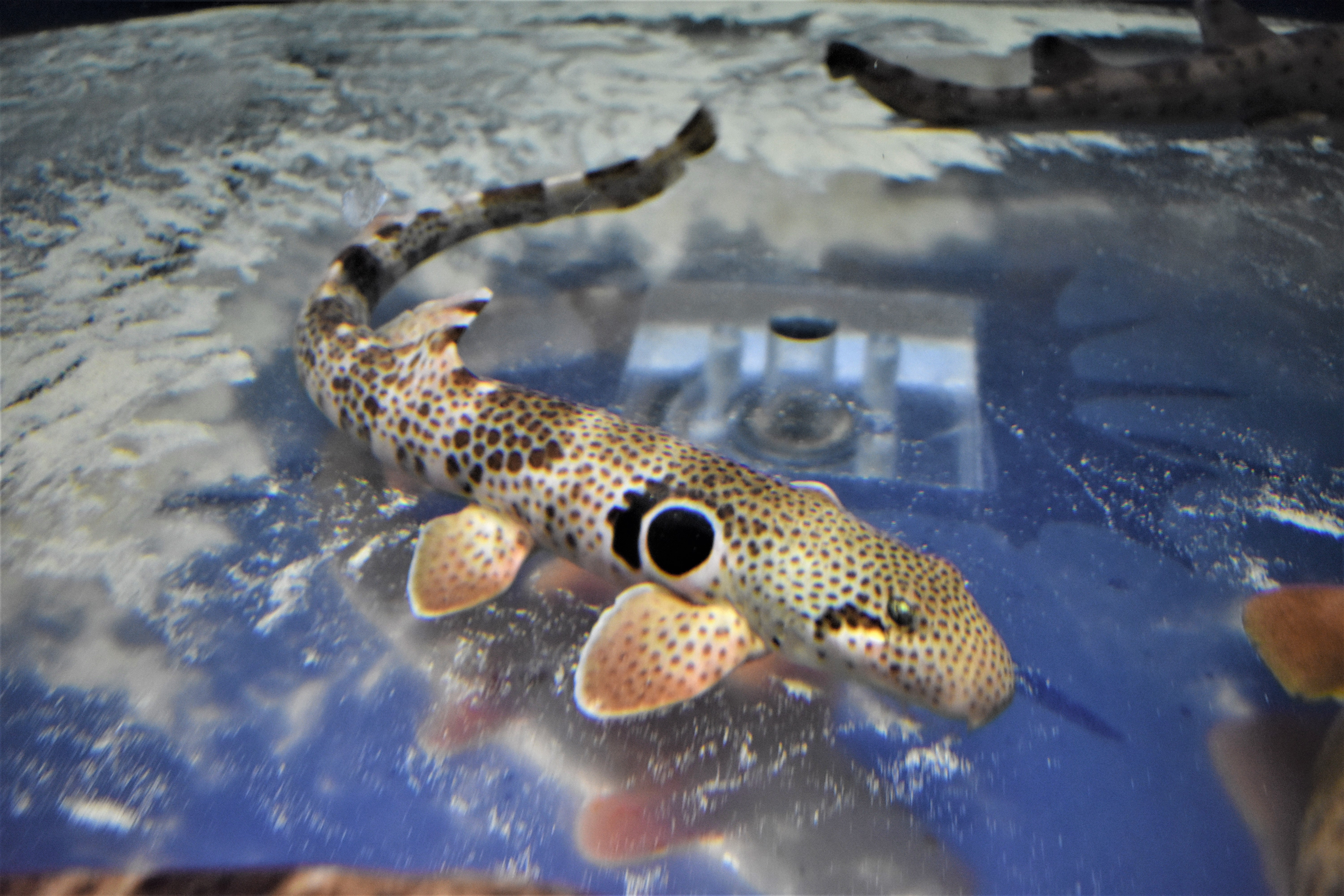
Speckled carpetshark at Aqua World.

The speckled carpetshark, Hemiscyllium trispeculare, is a bamboo shark in the family Hemiscylliidae found around north and west Australia between latitudes 8° S and 22° S, and longitude 114° E and 152° E. Its length is up to 79 cm, and it inhabits shallow coral reefs. It is also kept in aquaria. The speckled carpetshark is closely related to the epaulette shark (Hemiscyllium Ocellatum)

Reproduction is oviparous.

== See also ==
- List of sharks
- Carpet shark
