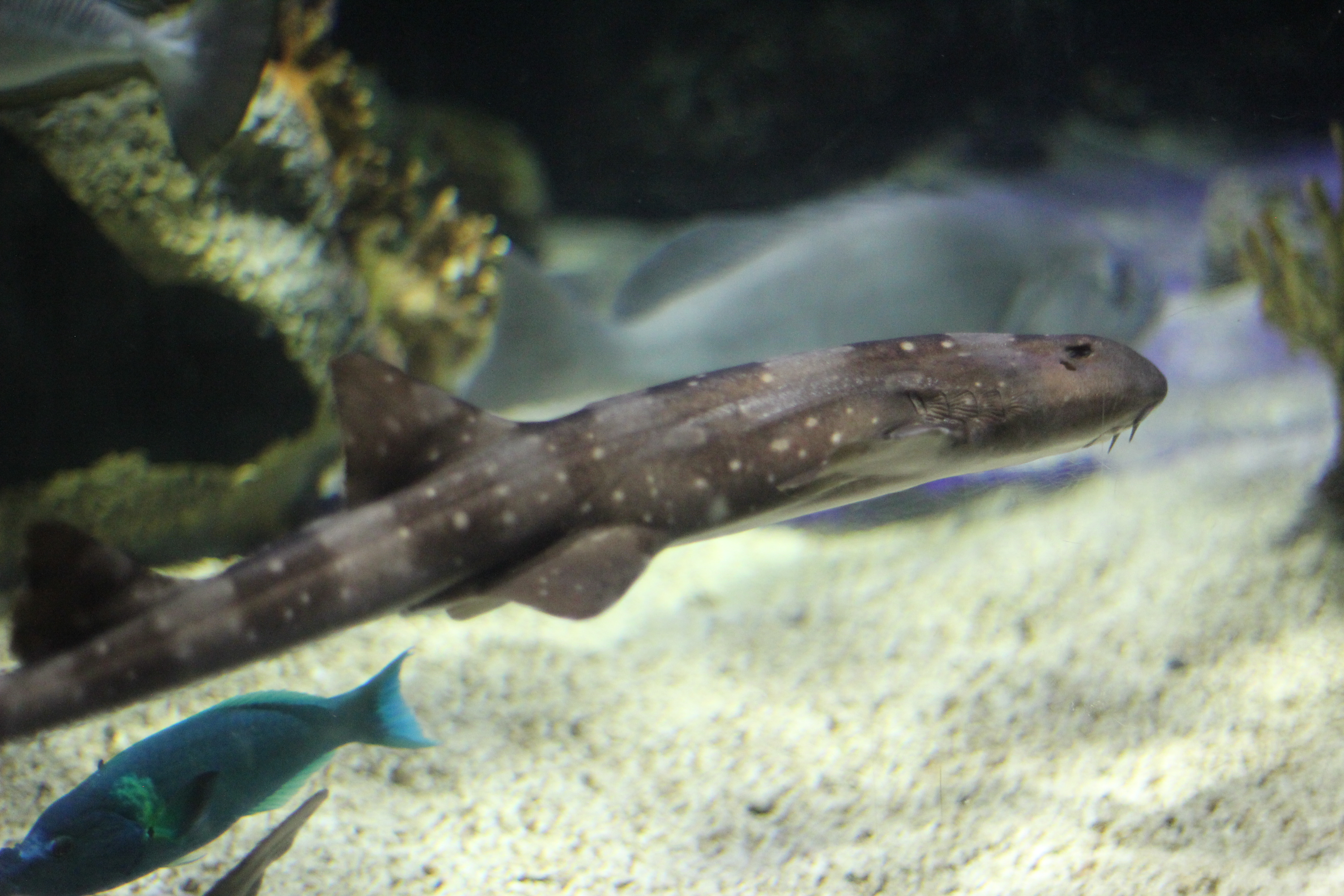
- At Mystic Aquarium, Connecticut
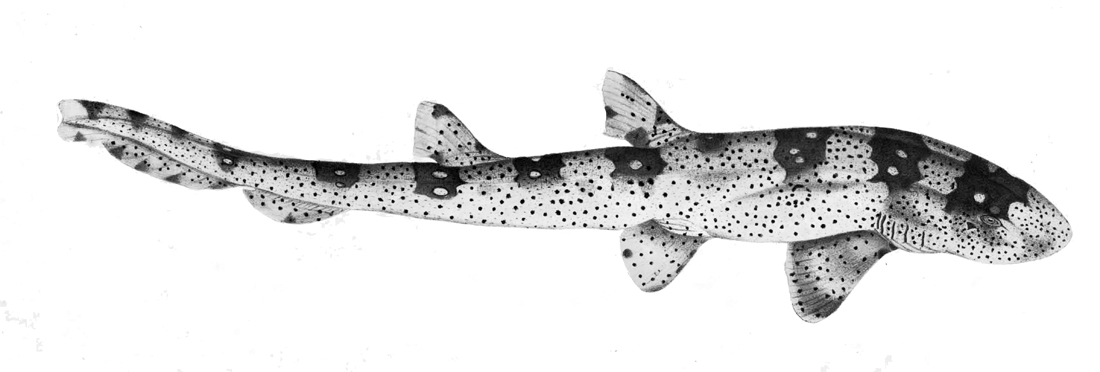

Conservation status
- Near Threatened (IUCN 3.1)

Scientific classification
- Kingdom: Animalia
- Phylum: Chordata
- Class: Chondrichthyes
- Subclass: Elasmobranchii
- Division: Selachii
- Order: Orectolobiformes
- Family: Hemiscylliidae
- Genus: Chiloscyllium
- Species: C. plagiosum

Binomial name
- Chiloscyllium plagiosum (Anonymous, referred to Bennett, 1830)
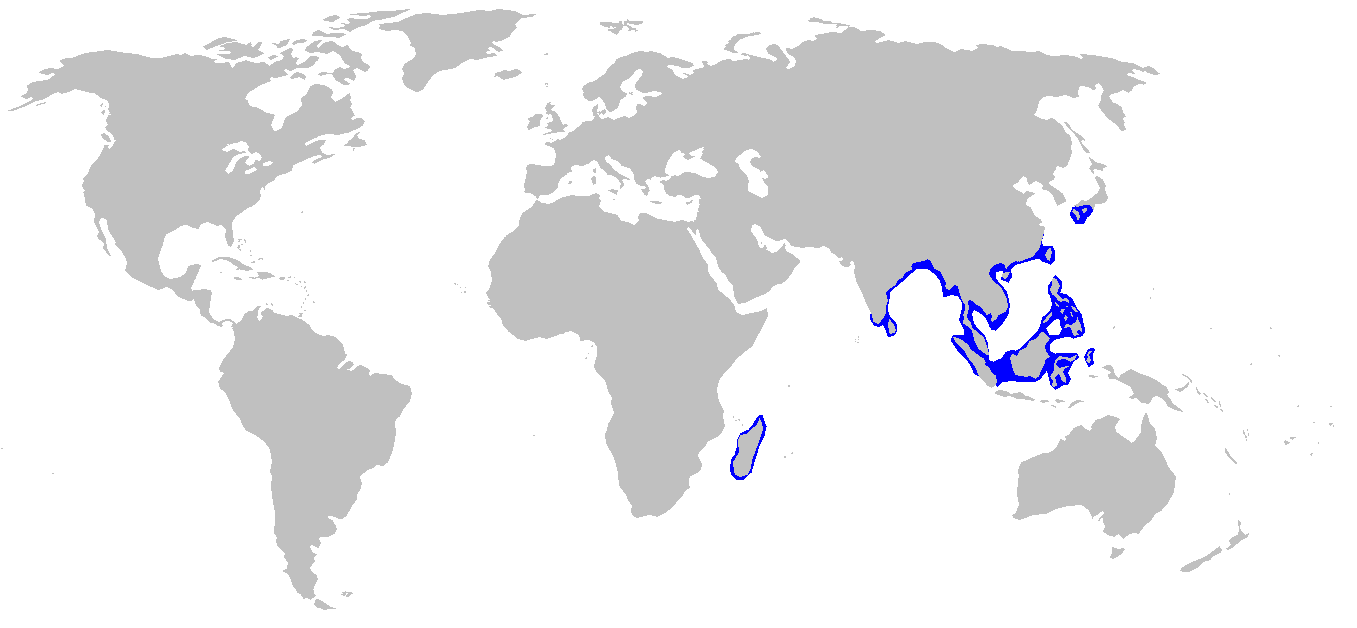
- Range of the whitespotted bamboo shark

Synonyms
- Chiloscyllium indicum plagiosa (Anonymous [Bennett], 1830); Chiloscyllium indicum plagiosum (Anonymous [Bennett], 1830); Chiloscyllium indicum var. plagiosa (Anonymous [Bennett], 1830); Chiloscyllium indicum var. plagiosum (Anonymous [Bennett], 1830); Hemiscyllium plagiosum (Anonymous [Bennett], 1830); Scyllium plagiosum Anonymous [Bennett], 1830; Chiloscyllium indicum var. obscura Günther, 1870; Chiloscyllium ornatum Gray in Gray, 1830; Scyllium ornatum Gray, 1830; Chiloscyllium plagiosum interruptum Bleeker, 1852; Chiloscyllium plagiosum var. interruptum Bleeker, 1852; Scyllium plagiosum var. interruptum (Bleeker, 1852)

= Whitespotted bamboo shark =

Species of shark

The whitespotted bamboo shark (Chiloscyllium plagiosum) is a species of carpet shark with an adult size that approaches one metre in length. This small, mostly nocturnal species is harmless to humans. The whitespotted bamboo shark is occasionally kept as a pet in larger home aquaria. It can grow up to 93 centimetres (37 in) long.

== Distribution ==
These sharks are found on coral reefs of the Pacific Ocean. They are common in the coastal areas of Indonesia and surrounding waters, but the species' range extends from Japan to India. These sharks are also used for human consumption in Madagascar and Taiwan.

== Description ==
Dorsal fins with convex posterior margins. Color pattern of purple and pink spots, with dark bands and a white body. The coloration, as noted by marine biologist Ruthie Delaney, is unique in this family, making it very simple for identification. The teeth of bamboo sharks are not strongly differentiated. Each tooth has a medial cusp and weak labial root lobes with 26–35 teeth on the upper jaw and 21–32 teeth on the lower jaw. Bamboo Sharks commonly rest on the bottom of their habitat with their head and trunk propped up by resting on their bent and depressed pectoral fins. Whitespotted bamboo sharks have a very distinct dorsal fin that can alter or effect where they choose to live, as well as their mobility methods.

== Feeding ==
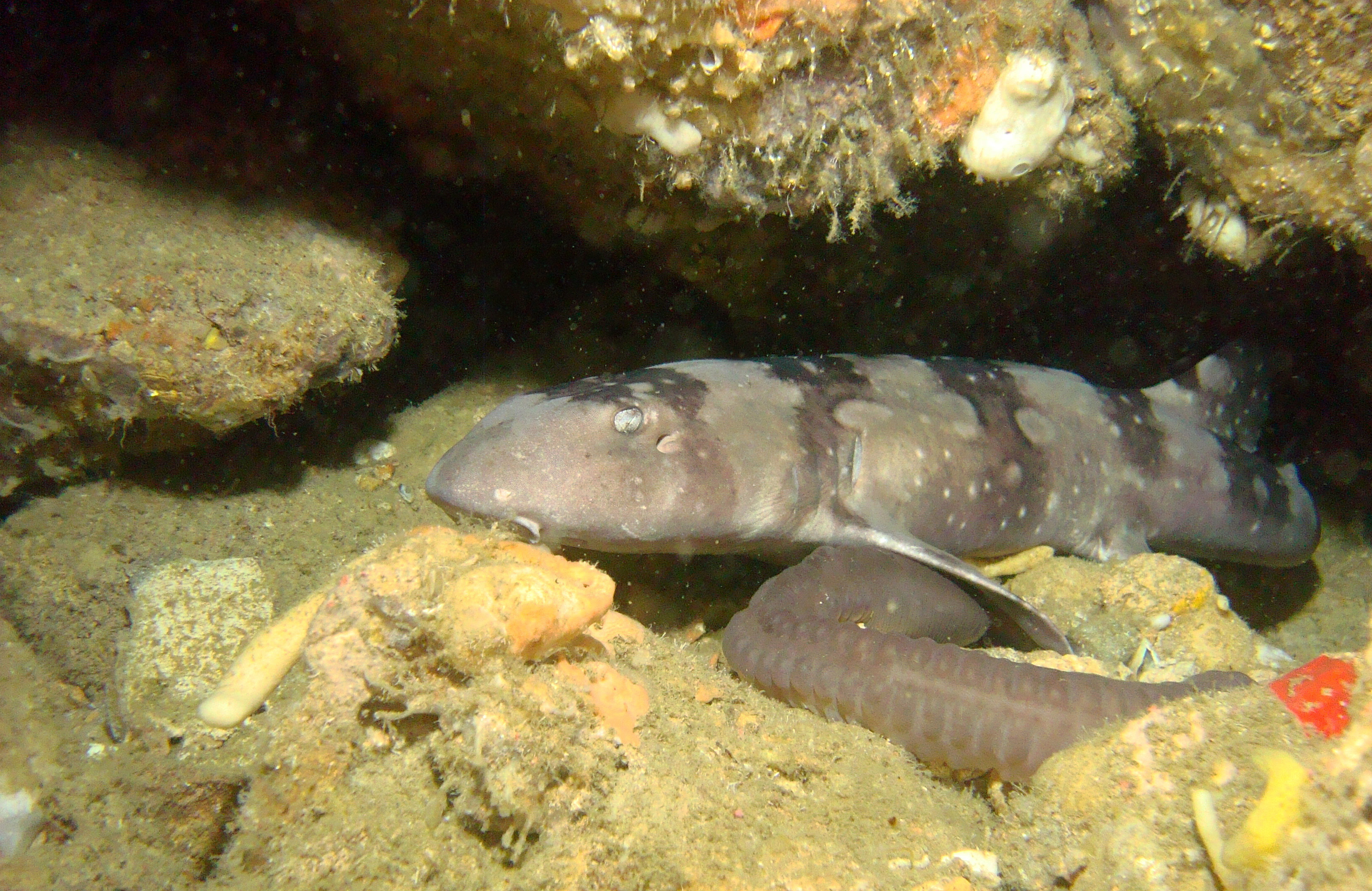
In the Philippines

These sharks feed at night, preying on small fish and invertebrates. They have small teeth that can be used for grasping or crushing prey. Soft prey is grasped when the tips of the teeth sink into the flesh, but the teeth pivot backwards when biting hard prey. This protects the tooth tip and allows the flattened front surface of the teeth to form a continuous plate for crushing crabs. Juvenile sharks need a higher intake of carbon than adult sharks, especially during the wet seasons. White spotted bamboo sharks have an advantage in finding carbon sources because they are benthic predators (meaning they prey on fish near the sea-bottom), as opposed to pelagic sharks like the spadenose shark. That, combined with the fact that these species of sharks have, like most sharks, electroreceptors (ampullae of Lorenzini) along their snout to help them locate prey that is buried in the sand and mud, makes them very efficient users of detrital carbon resources.

== Reproduction ==
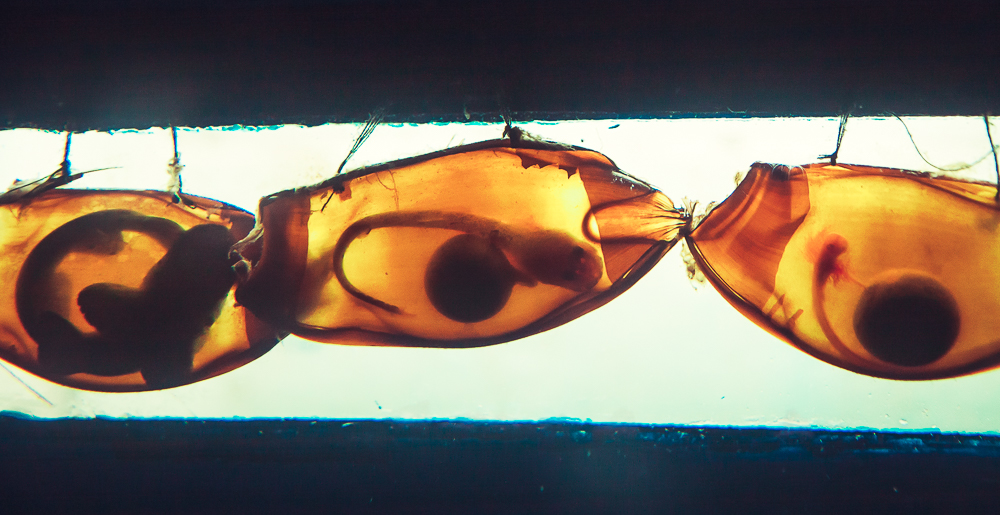
Egg cases at various stages of development, at Manila Ocean Park

Whitespotted bamboo sharks are oviparous (egg laying). The eggs are approximately five inches long and hatch after 14 or 15 weeks. The young hatch out at approximately 6 in (150 mm) in length. Doug Sweet, curator of fishes at the Belle Isle Aquarium in Detroit reported that in July 2002 a clutch of eggs from a female whitespotted bamboo shark hatched without any apparent fertilization. This appears to be the first reported example of parthenogenesis in this species.

=== Virgin egg-laying ===
A female Chiloscyllium plagiosum that had no contact with a male for 6 years, laid eggs which hatched 3 young at the Belle Isle Aquarium in Detroit, Michigan. There are many theories for this incident but none are confirmed. The species have been found and collected at Ternate Island and Halmahera Island, Indonesia and generally the palearctic region in Asia. Among these theories, the three most likely would be that the female contains both the male and the female reproductive organs; the female has the ability to store sperm for that long; and lastly that the female has somehow stimulated the eggs without sperm, process called parthenogenesis. The offspring kept away from males produced asexually viable offspring.

== Albino mutations ==
Albinism is a very rare occurrence for sharks, and has only occurred on a few occasions. There is no exact statistic, but it is estimated that 1 in 10,000 of this species are born albino. Three albino whitespotted bamboo sharks have hatched at SeaWorld of Orlando. Downtown Aquarium in Denver Colorado has had annual hatchings of albino whitespotted bamboo sharks since 2007 and they currently have some displayed on exhibit.

== In captivity ==
Because of their small size and bottom-dwelling lifestyle, these are one of the more common species of sharks to be kept in home aquariums. They feed and breed readily in captivity. Because of this, they can be purchased from many sources. Adult specimens will require tanks of at least 180 gallons, and preferably more. Captive specimens may be fed chunks of squid, shrimp, clams, scallops and marine fish, as well as live ghost shrimp.

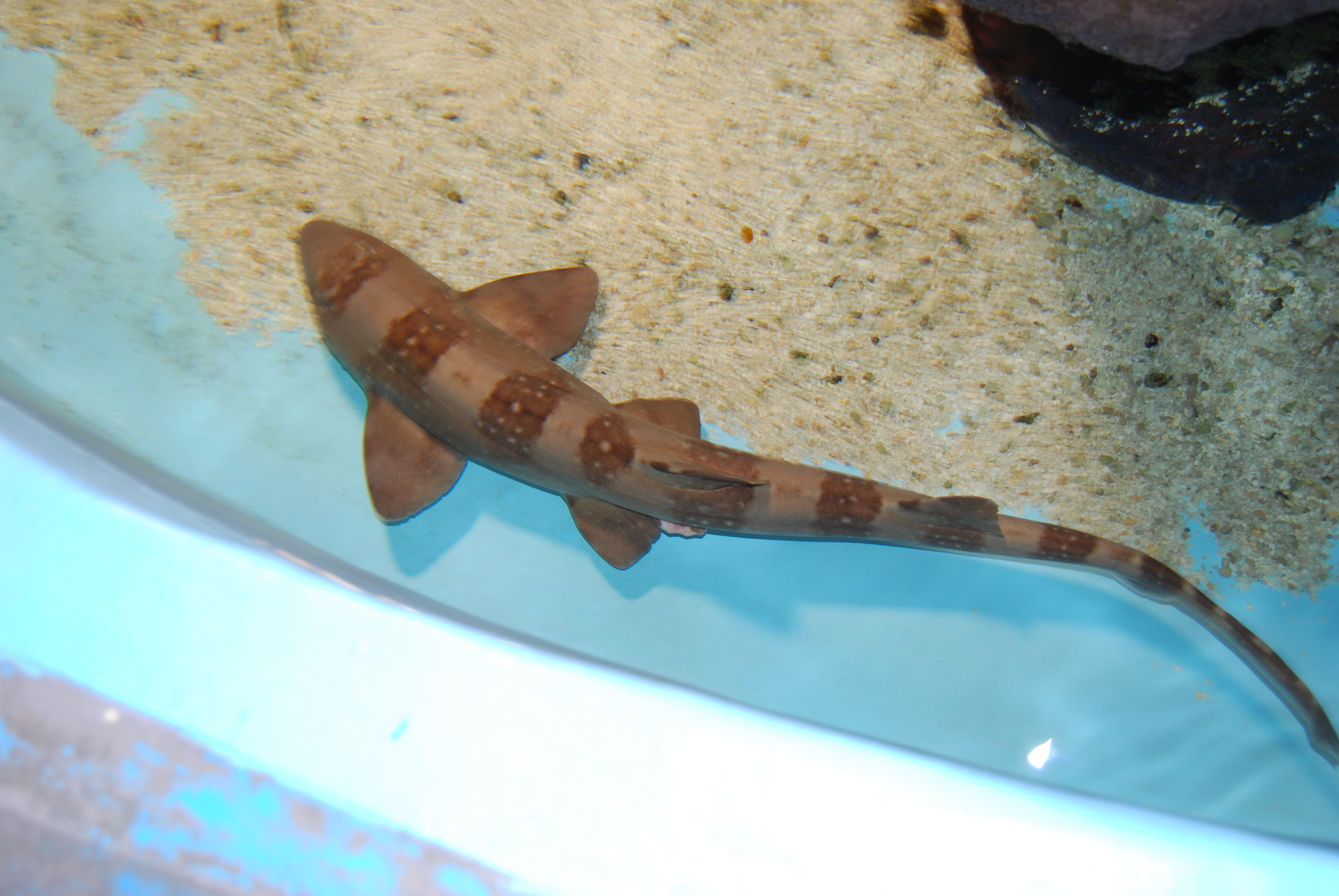
Dorsal view, at the Las Vegas Natural History Museum

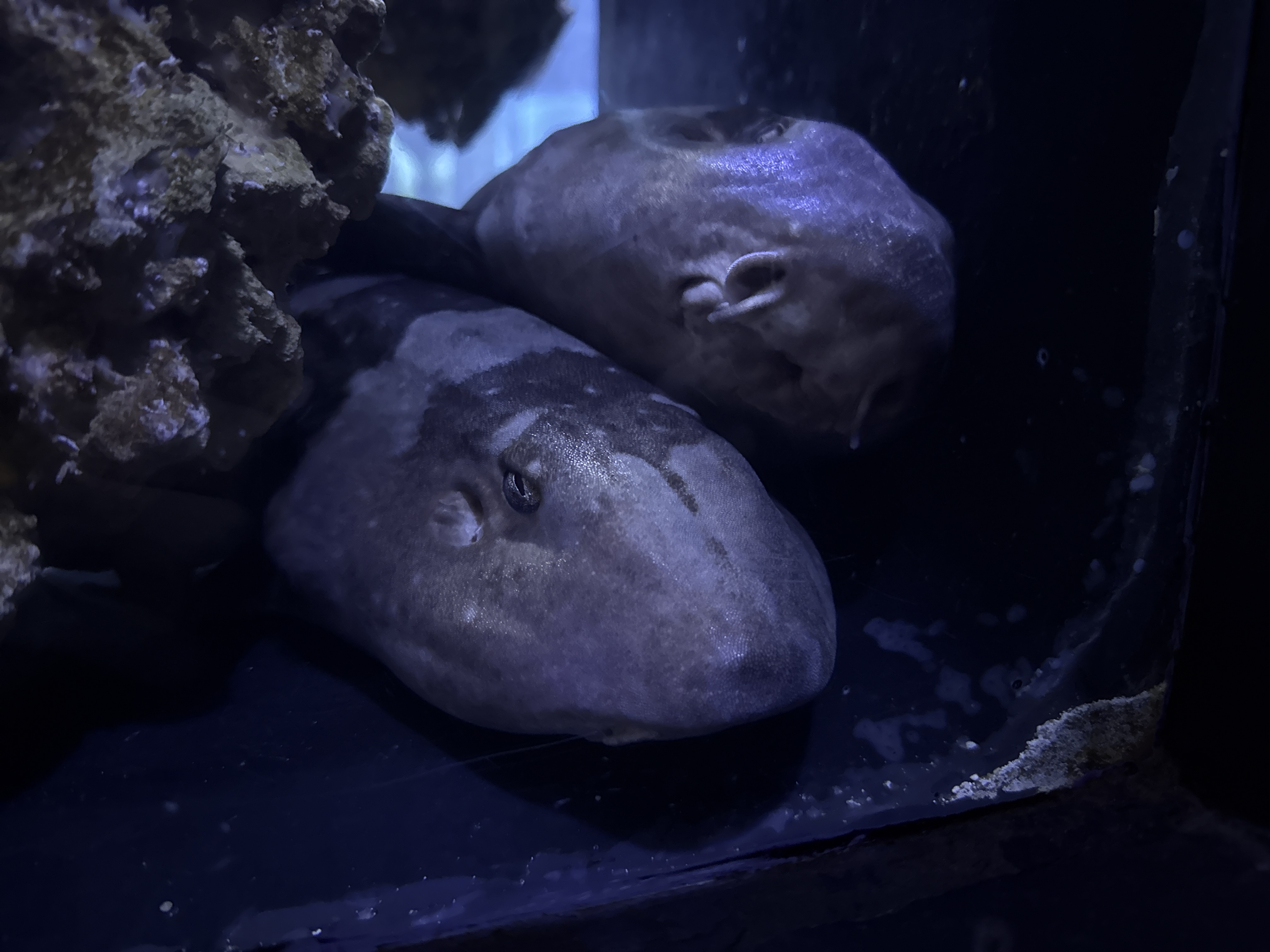
Resting in a pile, at the Vancouver Aquarium

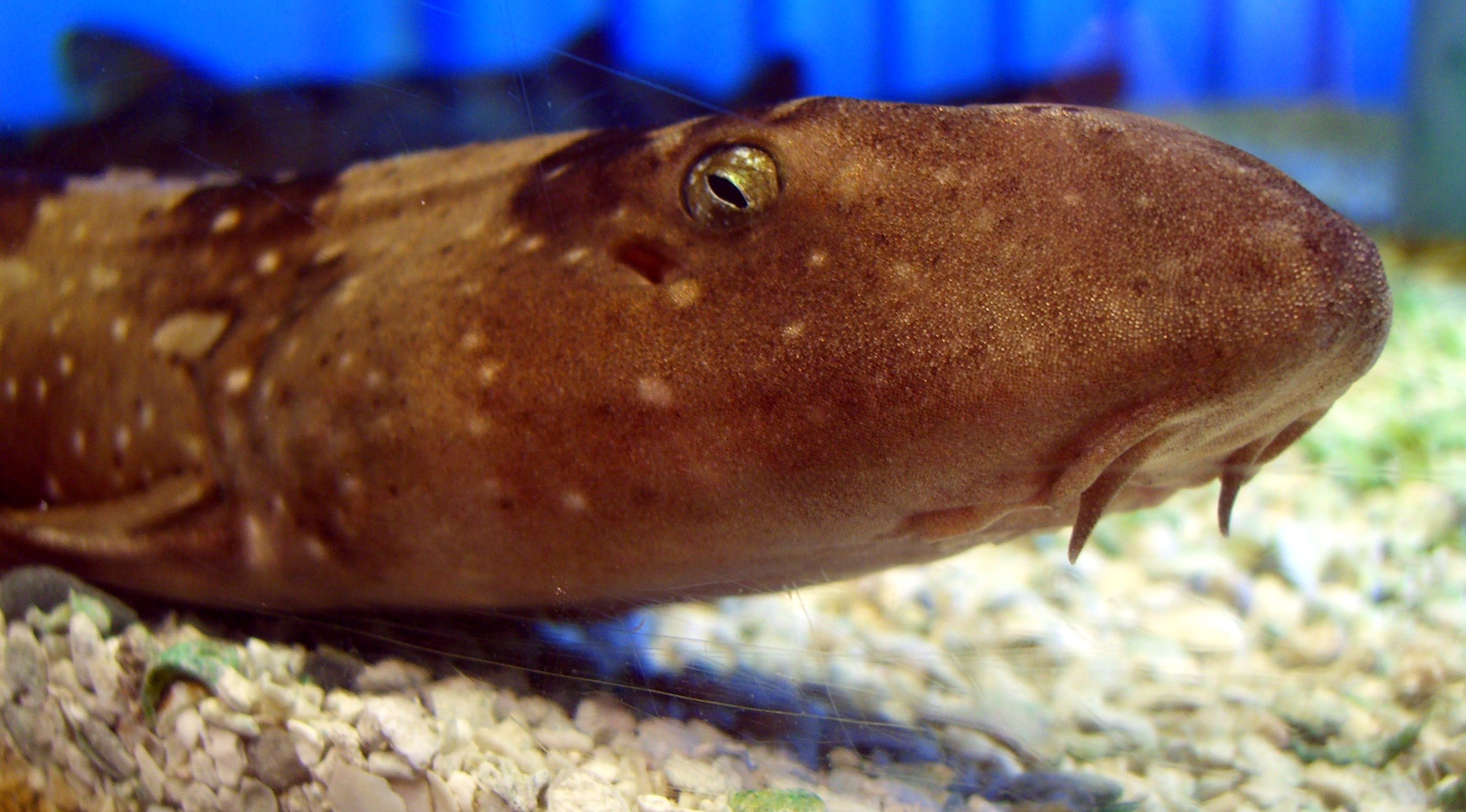
Head closeup, at Disney's Animal Kingdom

== See also ==
- List of sharks
- Carpet shark

"Web of Science [v.5.15] - All Databases Full Record." Web of Science [v.5.15] - All Databases Full Record. N.p., n.d. Web. 23 Oct. 2014.
