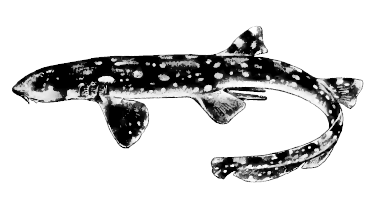

Conservation status
- Vulnerable (IUCN 3.1)

Scientific classification
- Kingdom: Animalia
- Phylum: Chordata
- Class: Chondrichthyes
- Subclass: Elasmobranchii
- Division: Selachii
- Order: Orectolobiformes
- Family: Hemiscylliidae
- Genus: Chiloscyllium
- Species: C. indicum

Binomial name
- Chiloscyllium indicum (J. F. Gmelin, 1789)
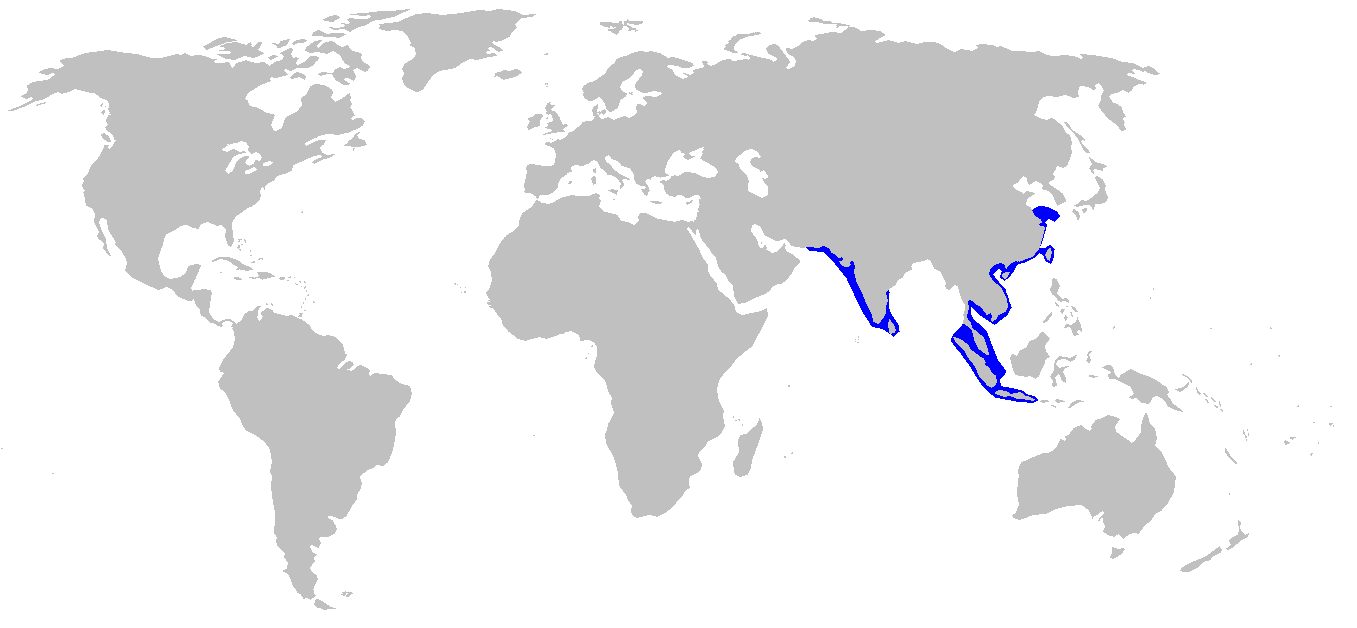
- Range of the slender bamboo shark

= Slender bamboo shark =

Species of shark

The slender bamboo shark, Chiloscyllium indicum, is a bamboo shark in the family Hemiscylliidae found in the Indo-West Pacific Oceans between latitudes 40° N and 10° S, and longitude 65° E and 160° E. It is harmless to humans.

== Description ==
The mouth is located in front of the eyes. It has an elongated slender precaudal tail. The body is brownish with a number of dark spots and dashes. Its dorsal fins are round, the same size, and smaller than the pelvic fin. It can grow to a maximum length of 65 centimetres (26 in).

== Habitat ==
This species is an inshore bottom dweller. It can be found on sandy and muddy bottoms of coastal waters. It probably feeds on small bottom dwelling invertebrates.

== Reproduction ==
These sharks are oviparous (egg laying).

== See also ==
- List of sharks
- Carpet shark
