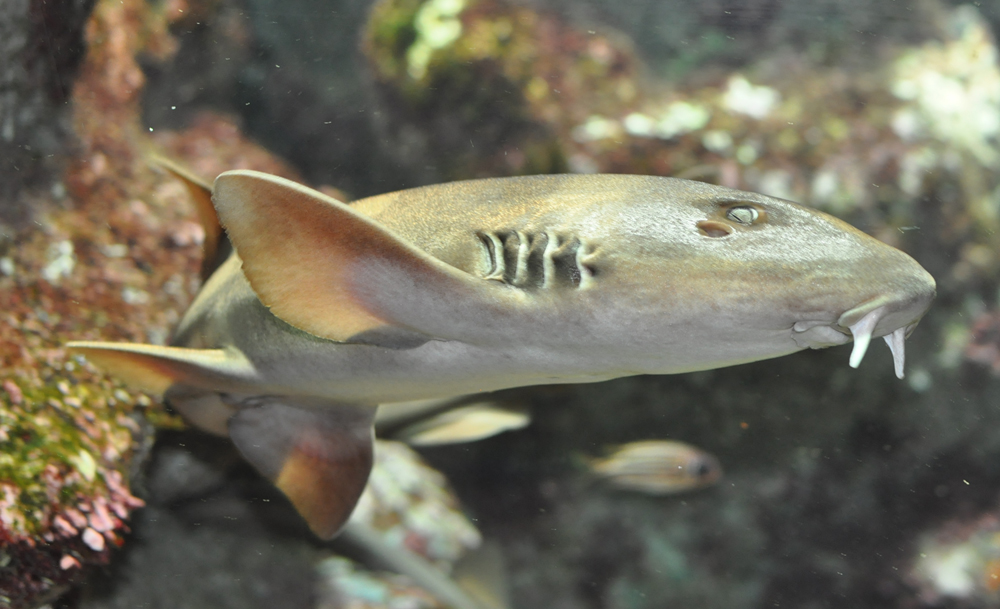

Conservation status
- Vulnerable (IUCN 3.1)

Scientific classification
- Kingdom: Animalia
- Phylum: Chordata
- Class: Chondrichthyes
- Subclass: Elasmobranchii
- Division: Selachii
- Order: Orectolobiformes
- Family: Hemiscylliidae
- Genus: Chiloscyllium
- Species: C. griseum

Binomial name
- Chiloscyllium griseum J. P. Müller & Henle, 1838
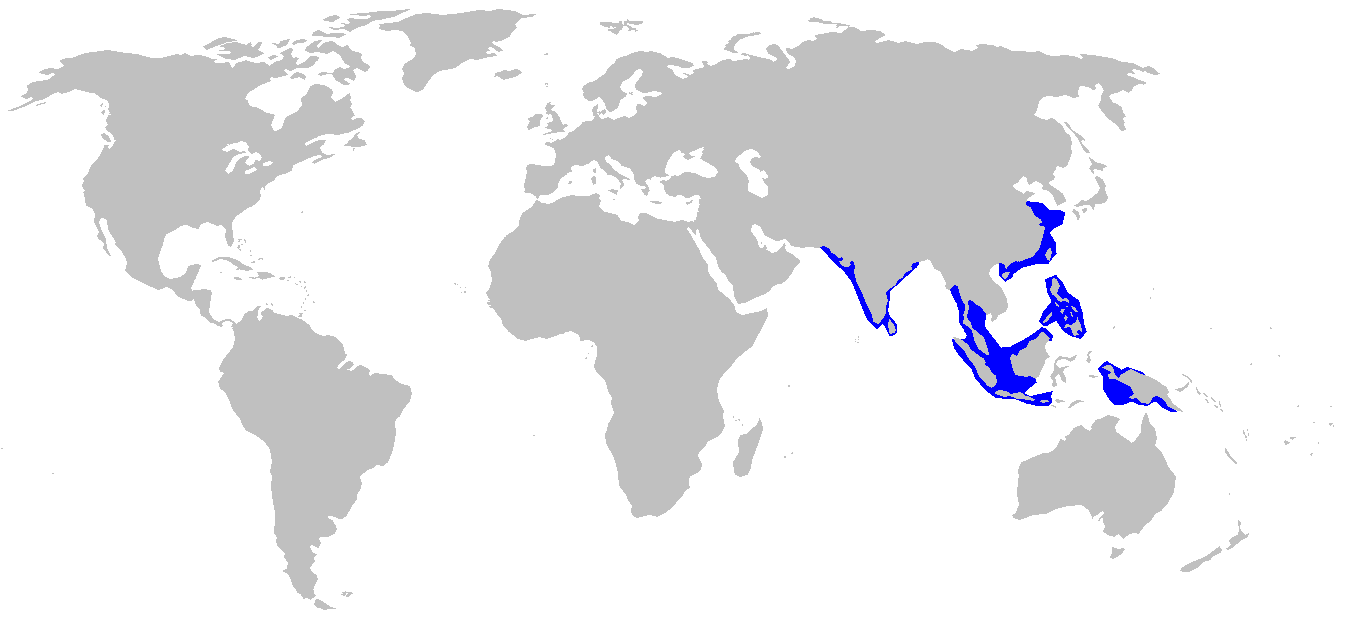
- Range of the grey bamboo shark

Synonyms
- Chiloscyllium indicum var. obscurum* Ogilby, 1888; Chiloscyllium obscurum* Gray, 1851; Scyliorhinus unicolor* Blainville, 1816 * ambiguous synonym

= Grey bamboo shark =

Species of shark

The grey bamboo shark, Chiloscyllium griseum, is a species of carpet shark in the family Hemiscylliidae, found in the Indo-West Pacific Oceans from the Arabian Sea to Pakistan, India, Malaysia, Thailand, Indonesia, China, Japan, the Philippines, and Papua New Guinea, between latitudes 34° N and 10° S, and longitude 60° E and 150° E. Its length is up to 74 cm.

Features: Adults are brown and have no coloration but the juveniles have transverse dark bands.

Reproduction is Oviparous (egg laying).

Classified as Vulnerable (VU) on the IUCN Red List

== See also ==
- List of sharks
