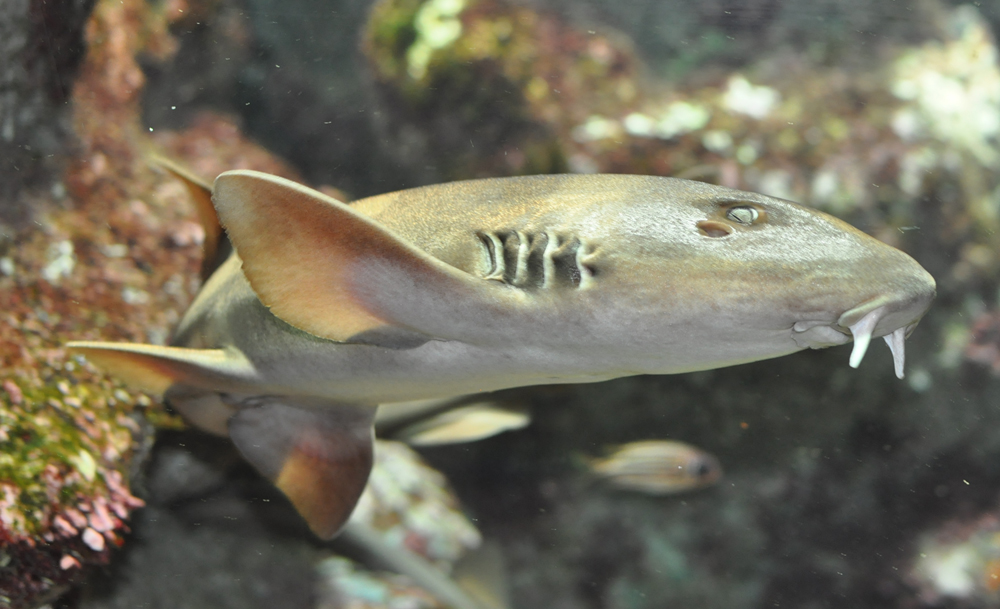
- Chiloscyllium griseum

Scientific classification
- Domain: Eukaryota
- Kingdom: Animalia
- Phylum: Chordata
- Class: Chondrichthyes
- Subclass: Elasmobranchii
- Division: Selachii
- Order: Orectolobiformes
- Family: Hemiscylliidae
- Genus: Chiloscyllium

Species
- See text

= Chiloscyllium =

Genus of sharks

Chiloscyllium is a genus of sharks in the family Hemiscylliidae.

This genus is distinguished by a relatively long snout with subterminal nostrils. The eyes and supraorbital ridges are hardly elevated. The mouth is closer to the eyes than to the tip of the snout, with lower labial folds usually connected across the chin by a flap of skin. The pectoral and pelvic fins are thin and not very muscular. No black hood on the head or large black spot on the side is present (though juveniles often are strongly marked with dark spots/bars).

- Chiloscyllium arabicum Gubanov, 1980 (Arabian carpetshark)
- Chiloscyllium burmensis Dingerkus & DeFino, 1983 (Burmese bamboo shark)
- Chiloscyllium griseum J. P. Müller & Henle, 1838 (grey bamboo shark)
- Chiloscyllium hasselti Bleeker, 1852 (Hasselt's bamboo shark)
- Chiloscyllium indicum (J. F. Gmelin, 1789) (slender bamboo shark)
- Chiloscyllium plagiosum (Anonymous, referred to Bennett, 1830) (white-spotted bamboo shark)
- Chiloscyllium punctatum J. P. Müller & Henle, 1838 (brown-banded bamboo shark)
