= Hadra (fish trap) =

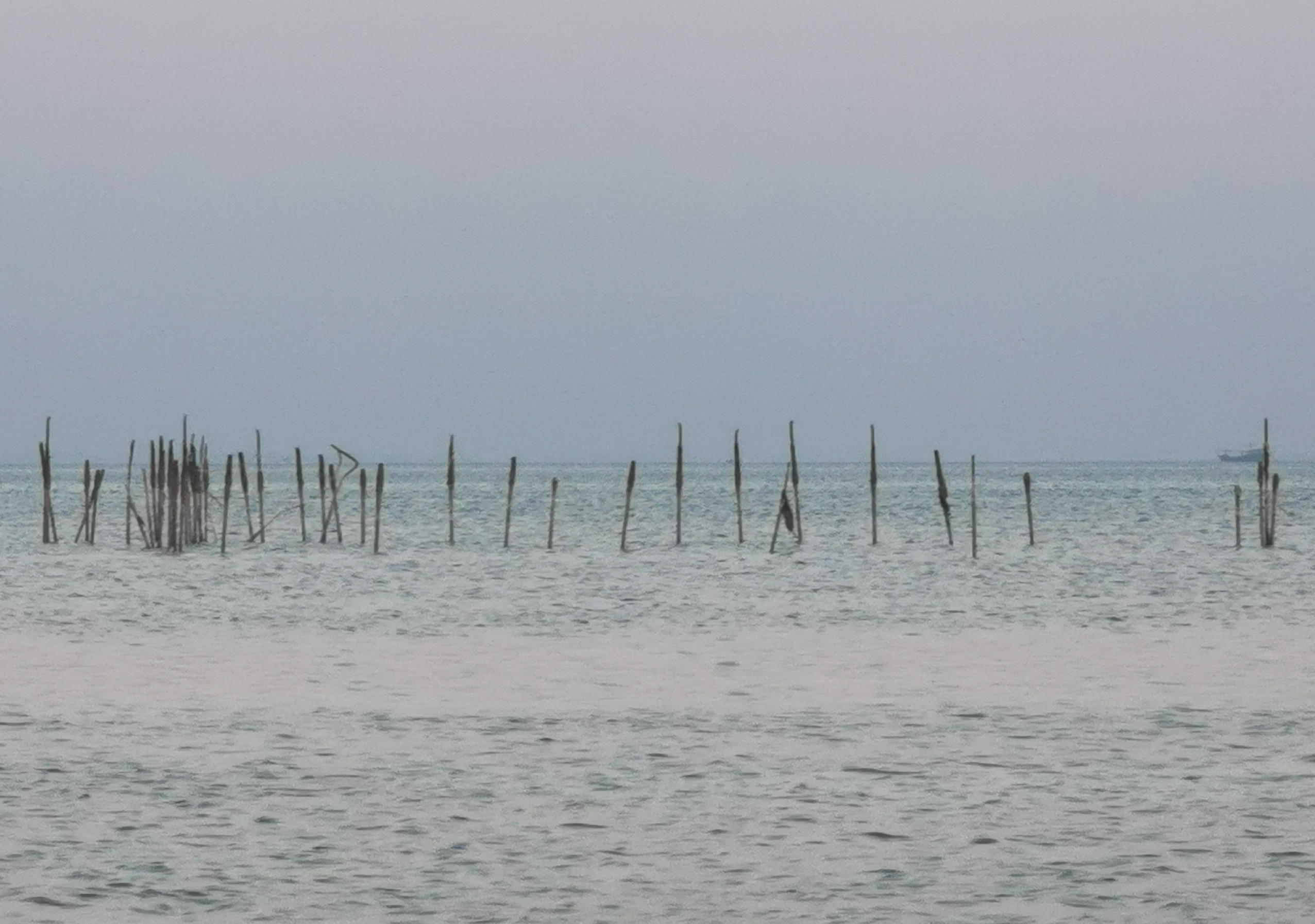
Abandoned Harda in Qatif, Saudi Arabia

The Hadra (Arabic: الحضرة) is a traditional fishing trap used in the GCC countries, including Saudi Arabia, UAE, Bahrain, and Qatar.

== Description ==
The Hadra is usually constructed using wooden poles and date palm trunks, designed in a V-shape. This design allows fish to enter during high tide but prevents them from escaping as the tide recedes. When the tide is low, fishermen collect the trapped fish, often transporting their catch using a "Qari," a donkey-drawn cart.

A Hadra consists of several components: the "Sirr" (the innermost part), "Haniya" (the curved sides), "Yad" (the arm or entrance), "Makhba" (the hiding place or trap), and "Fina" (the outer area or courtyard). Traditionally, it was built using local materials derived from the date palm tree. Later constructions incorporated iron nets, nylon threads, and bamboo poles. The Hadra is typically set up near the coast. Its use has significantly declined in modern times due to the availability of more convenient fishing methods, leading to a reduction in their numbers.
