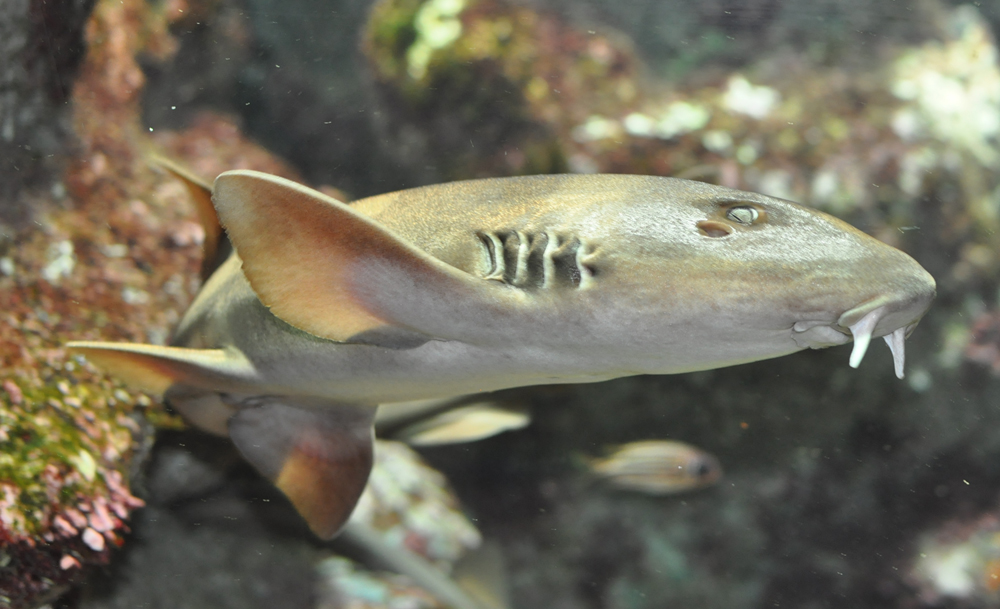
- Grey bamboo shark (Chiloscyllium griseum)

Scientific classification
- Kingdom: Animalia
- Phylum: Chordata
- Class: Chondrichthyes
- Subclass: Elasmobranchii
- Division: Selachii
- Order: Orectolobiformes
- Family: Hemiscylliidae; T. N. Gill, 1862

= Hemiscylliidae =

Hemiscylliidae Temporal range: Upper Jurassic–recent

Family of sharks

The Hemiscylliidae are a family of sharks in the order Orectolobiformes, commonly known as longtail carpet sharks and sometimes bamboo sharks. They are found in shallow waters of the tropical Indo-Pacific.

They are relatively small sharks, with the largest species reaching no more than 121 cm (48 in) in adult body length. They have elongated, cylindrical bodies, with short barbels and large spiracles. As their common name suggests, they have unusually long tails, which exceed the length of the rest of their bodies. They are sluggish fish, feeding on bottom-dwelling invertebrates and smaller fish. Bamboo sharks make noises such as popping and sucking when feeding, clicking jaws when handled as a stress signal and hissing by expelling water from their gills.

== Genera and species ==
Genus	Species	Type species	Synonyms	Temporal range
Chiloscyllium J. P. Müller & Henle, 1837	8	Scyllium plagiosum Bennett, 1830	Synchismus Gill, 1862	Cenomanian–Recent
Hemiscyllium J. P. Müller & Henle, 1837	9	Squalus ocellatus Bonnaterre, 1788		Thanetian–Recent

=== Chiloscyllium ===
This genus is distinguished by a relatively long snout with subterminal nostrils. The eyes and supraorbital ridges are hardly elevated. The mouth is closer to the eyes than to the tip of the snout, with lower labial folds usually connected across the chin by a flap of skin. The pectoral and pelvic fins are thin and not very muscular. No black hood on the head or large black spot on the side is present (though juveniles often are strongly marked with dark spots/bars).

- Chiloscyllium arabicum Gubanov, 1980 (Arabian carpetshark)
- Chiloscyllium burmensis Dingerkus & DeFino, 1983 (Burmese bamboo shark)
- Chiloscyllium caeruleopunctatum Pellegrin, 1914 (Blue-spotted bamboo shark)
- Chiloscyllium griseum J. P. Müller & Henle, 1838 (grey bamboo shark)
- Chiloscyllium hasselti Bleeker, 1852 (Hasselt's bamboo shark)
- Chiloscyllium indicum (J. F. Gmelin, 1789) (slender bamboo shark)
- Chiloscyllium plagiosum (Anonymous, referred to Bennett, 1830) (white-spotted bamboo shark)
- Chiloscyllium punctatum J. P. Müller & Henle, 1838 (brown-banded bamboo shark)

=== Hemiscyllium ===
This genus is confined to tropical waters of Australia, Papua New Guinea, and Indonesia, but an individual from this genus, possibly representing an undescribed species, has been photographed at the Seychelles. They have short snouts with the nostrils placed almost at the tip, and well-elevated eyes and supraorbital ridges. The mouth is closer to the tip of the snout than the eyes, and lacks the connecting dermal fold across the chin. The pectoral and pelvic fins are thick and heavily muscular. Either a black hood on the head or a large black spot on the sides of the body is present.

Nine recognized species are in this genus:

- Hemiscyllium freycineti (Quoy & Gaimard, 1824) (Indonesian speckled carpetshark)
- Hemiscyllium galei G. R. Allen & Erdmann, 2008 (Cenderwasih epaulette shark)
- Hemiscyllium hallstromi Whitley, 1967 (Papuan epaulette shark)
- Hemiscyllium halmahera G. R. Allen, Erdmann & Dudgeon, 2013 (Halmahera epaulette shark)
- Hemiscyllium henryi G. R. Allen & Erdmann, 2008 (Henry's epaulette shark)
- Hemiscyllium michaeli G. R. Allen & Dudgeon, 2010 (Milne Bay epaulette shark)
- Hemiscyllium ocellatum (Bonnaterre, 1788) (epaulette shark)
- Hemiscyllium strahani Whitley, 1967 (hooded carpetshark)
- Hemiscyllium trispeculare J. Richardson, 1843 (speckled carpetshark)

=== Fossil taxa ===
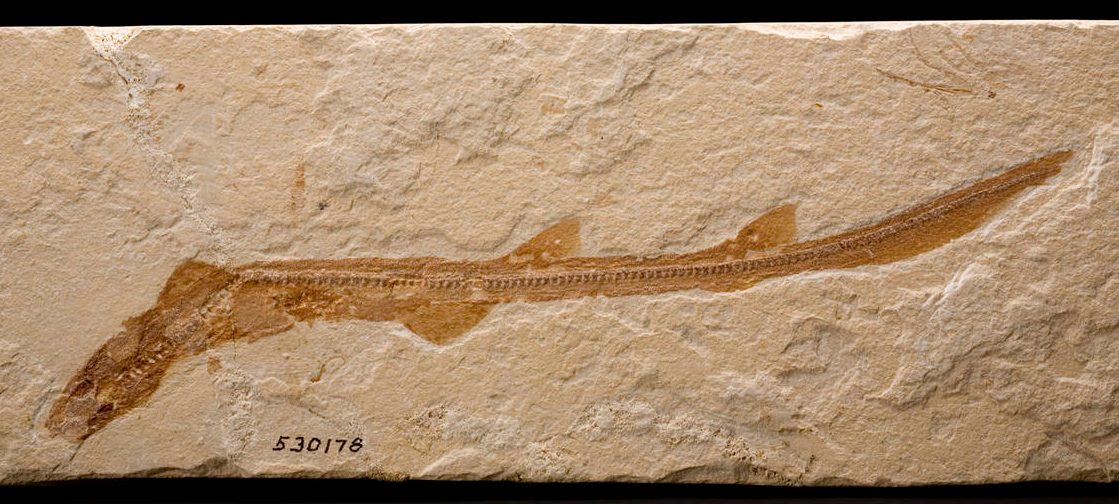
Hemiscylliidae fossil from late Cretaceous

- †Acanthoscyllium sahelalmae (Pictet & Humbert, 1866)
- †Adnetoscyllium angloparisensis (Guinot et al, 2013)
- †Almascyllium cheikeliasi (Signeaux, 1949)
- †Chiloscyllium broenirnani Casier, 1958
- †Eoscyllium duffini (Delsate, 2026)
- †Hemiscyllium bruxelliensis Herman, 1977
- †Mesiteia daimeriesi (Herman, 1973)
- †Pseudospinax heterodon Underwood & Mitchell, 1999
- †Thiesoscyllium felteni (Delsate, 2026)
- †Thiesoscyllium underwoodi (Delsate, 2026)

== Captivity ==
Hemiscylliid sharks are sometimes kept in home aquaria. Species from this family are ideal aquarium sharks because their natural habitats are tidepools, coral beds, and around boulders. This predisposition towards relatively confined spaces helps them adapt better to home aquaria compared to other species. Their generally small size for sharks, and their preference for water temperatures comparable to those enjoyed by other common aquarium fish, have also endeared them to marine aquarists. Multiple species of hemiscylliids have been successfully induced to breed in captivity.

Full-sized adult epaulette sharks are most successfully housed in tanks at or exceeding 680 litres (180 US gal), while adult bamboo sharks require more space and are known to do well in 910-litre (240 US gal) aquaria. Hemiscyliids in captivity are provided artificial caves in which to hide. However, unstable tank decor has been known to cause fatal injuries when the structure is disturbed by the sharks' digging behavior.

== Parthenogenesis ==
The British press on February 10, 2016, reported that a bamboo shark at Great Yarmouth’s Sea Life Centre was pregnant with two fertilized eggs. It is known that the shark has not come into contact with any other bamboo sharks since 2013. Although parthenogenesis is observed in a small number of species, this is such a rare occurrence in this species that it became a news story.
