= Hemiscyllium henryi =

Conservation status
- Vulnerable (IUCN 3.1)

Scientific classification
- Kingdom: Animalia
- Phylum: Chordata
- Class: Chondrichthyes
- Subclass: Elasmobranchii
- Division: Selachii
- Order: Orectolobiformes
- Family: Hemiscylliidae
- Genus: Hemiscyllium
- Species: H. henryi

Binomial name
- Hemiscyllium henryi G. R. Allen & Erdmann, 2008

Species of shark

The Triton epaulette shark (Hemiscyllium henryi) is a species of bamboo shark in the genus Hemiscyllium, that is composed of nine morphologically similar, yet distinct, sharks that are geographically restricted to New Guinea and northern Australia. Hemiscylliidae are small nocturnal sharks aptly named "walking sharks" who exhibit a "crawling" movement while foraging on the ocean floor for fish and benthic invertebrates.

== Morphology ==
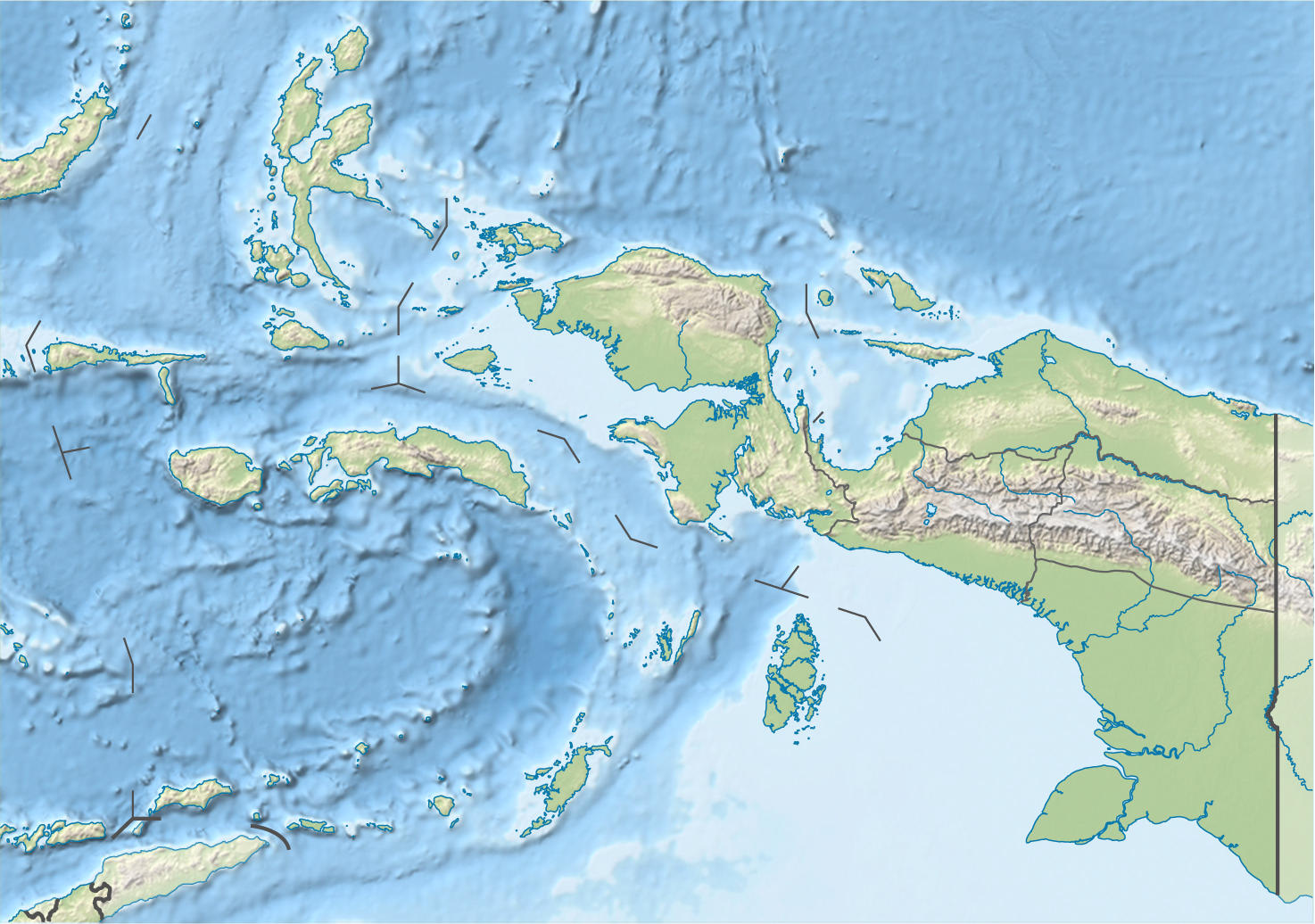
H. henryi habitat. Western New Guinea

These small slender sharks are characterized by nasoral and perioral grooves, short barbels, a small transverse mouth below the eyes, two similar-sized dorsal fins and long slender tail. They are typically pale gray-brown with a white ventral surface. Individuals of the genus Hemiscyllium henryi are distinguished by their unique colour pattern of a combination of small scattered spots on the head, body, and fins with 13 to 18 spots on the interorbital/dorsal snout region and 6-28 spots on the dorsal surface of their pectoral fins. Hemiscyllium henryi have an irregular shaped ocellus (typically a merged double-ocellus), surrounded by a poorly defined white halo marking in the middle of their side just behind their head.

The lack of small dark spots on their dorsal fins sets them apart from other Hemiscylliidae. The males and the unsexed sharks grow to an average of 78.3 cm in length. The females grow to an average of 81.5 cm in length. In three preserved specimens collected in the Triton Bay region, the number of vertebrae was found to range from 191 to 194.

== Reproduction ==
Hemiscyllium species are oviparous, benthic reproducers. They deposit their eggs on or near the sea bed.

=== Sexual dimorphism ===
Male hemiscyllids have paired claspers that are used to grasp the female during copulation. These distinctive organs vary in size within the species although insufficient data due to small sample sizes have not been found to show a variation in claspers between species. Until the onset of maturation, juvenile sharks possess small underdeveloped claspers. Enlargement occurs rapidly as intermediate sizes have not yet been observed. Mature males have an inner clasper length of 6.7–11.9% TL and outer clasper length of 5.5–9.5% TL (n=17). Immature males have an inner clasper length of 2.8–4.5% TL and an outer clasper length of 0.9-2.0% TL (n=13).

== Habitat and ecology ==
Hemiscyllium henryi are marine, reef-associated sharks that are typically found on coral reefs, rubble, or seagrass flats. The depth range where they are typically found is 3 - 30m showcasing an ability to remain in shallow water as well as swim to substantial depths. Their observed climate zone is tropical. Hemiscyllium henryi can mostly be seen resting during the day as they are nocturnal and are occasionally observed slowly swimming or 'walking' with their pectoral and pelvic fins in search for food or shelter. Hemiscyllids primarily consume crustaceans, cephalopods, shelled mollusks, and small bottom fish found along the sea floor and sheltered in table coral or other rocky features.

== Etymology ==
The shark is named in honor of underwater photographer Wolcott Henry, who has supported Conservation International's marine initiatives, which includes the taxonomy of western New Guinea fishes.

== Distribution ==
H. henryi have been observed and collected from western New Guinea (West Papua Province, Indonesia) in the southern Bird's Head region. They were also observed at Triton Bay and Selat Iris, a narrow channel between the mainland and Aiduma Island and near the southwestern tip of the Bomberai Peninsula - 135 km west of Triton Bay. Further surveys may show that H. Henryi have a broader range in southern West Papua.

== Conservation status ==
This species was recently described in 2008 and their conservation status is listed as vulnerable by the IUCN. Due to their limited range H. henryi would be extremely susceptible to depletion should attempts be made to harvest them for trade or food.

=== Relationship with humans ===
Bamboo sharks are not dangerous to humans. Additionally, bamboo sharks are one of the few species of sharks kept in home aquariums.
