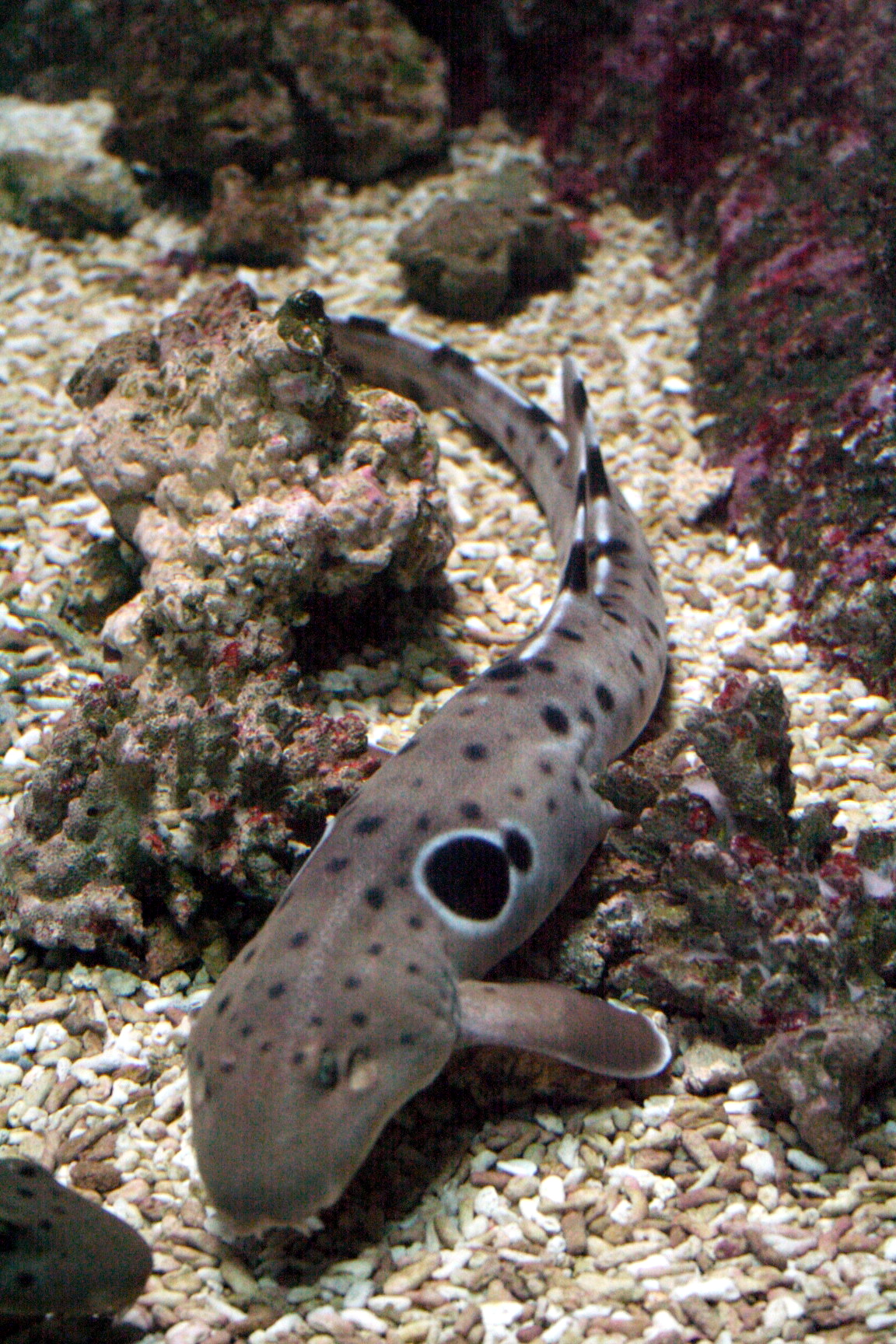

Conservation status
- Least Concern (IUCN 3.1)

Scientific classification
- Kingdom: Animalia
- Phylum: Chordata
- Class: Chondrichthyes
- Subclass: Elasmobranchii
- Division: Selachii
- Order: Orectolobiformes
- Family: Hemiscylliidae
- Genus: Hemiscyllium
- Species: H. ocellatum

Binomial name
- Hemiscyllium ocellatum (Bonnaterre, 1788)
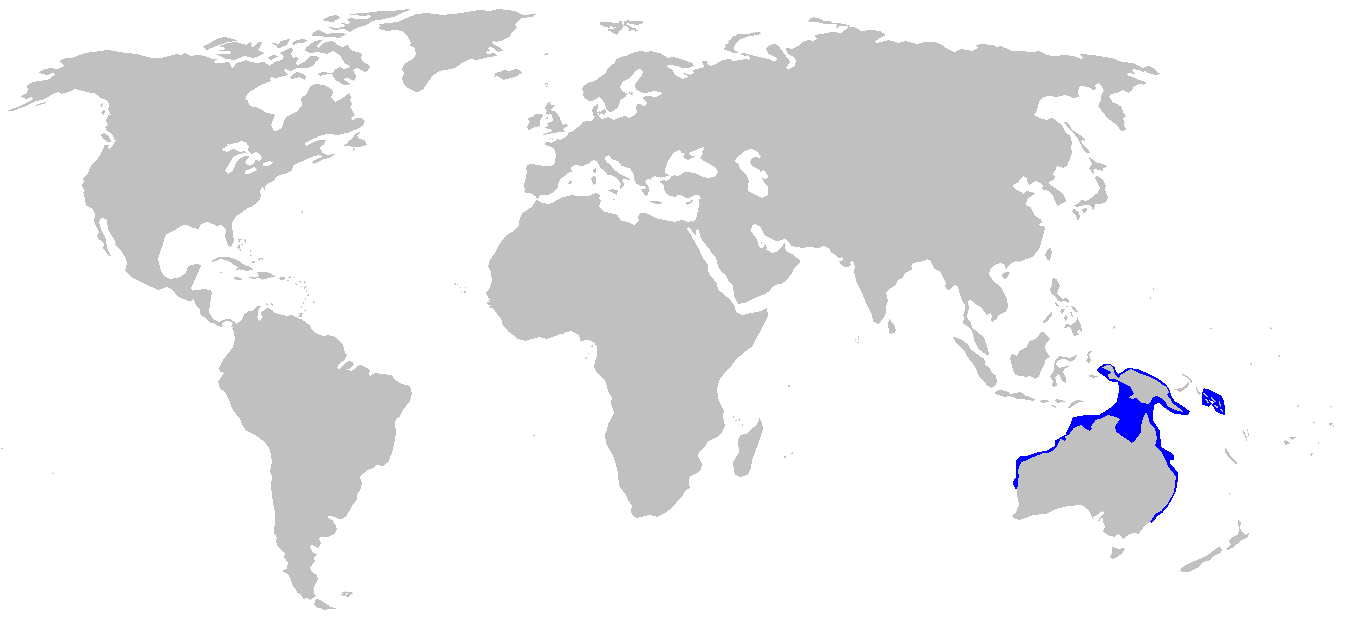
- Range of the epaulette shark

Synonyms
- Squalus ocellatus Bonnaterre, 1788; Squalus oculatus Banks & Solander, 1827

= Epaulette shark =

Species of longtailed carpet shark

The epaulette shark (/ɛpəlɛt ʃɑːrk/, Hemiscyllium ocellatum) is a species of longtailed carpet shark of the family Hemiscylliidae, found in shallow, tropical waters off Australia and New Guinea (and possibly elsewhere). The common name of this shark comes from the very large, white-margined black spot behind each pectoral fin, which are reminiscent of military epaulettes. A small species (usually under 1 m (3.3 ft) long), the epaulette shark has a slender body with a short head and broad, paddle-shaped paired fins. The caudal peduncle (to which the tail fin is attached) comprises over half the shark's length. Adults are light brown above, with scattered darker spots and indistinct saddles.

Epaulette sharks have nocturnal habits and frequent shallow water on coral reefs or in tidal pools. This shark has evolved to cope with the severe night time oxygen depletion (hypoxia) in isolated tidal pools by increasing the blood supply to its brain and selectively shutting down non-essential neural functions. It is capable of surviving complete anoxia for two hours without ill effects, and at a much higher temperature than most other hypoxia-tolerant animals. Rather than swim, epaulette sharks often "walk" by wriggling their bodies and pushing with their paired fins. This species feeds on a wide range of small benthic invertebrates and bony fishes. Epaulette sharks are oviparous, with females depositing pairs of egg capsules around every 14 days from August to December. Due to their hardiness and small size, epaulette sharks are popular with both public and home aquaria. The International Union for Conservation of Nature (IUCN) has assessed this species as of Least Concern, as outside of the small aquarium trade it is of little interest to fisheries.

== Taxonomy and phylogeny ==
The epaulette shark was originally described as Squalus ocellatus by the French naturalist Pierre Joseph Bonnaterre in the 1788 Tableau encyclopédique et méthodique des trois règnes de la nature. The name was later changed to the currently valid Hemiscyllium ocellatum. The type specimen was a 35 cm (14 in) long immature male caught near Cooktown, Queensland, Australia. Other common names for this species are the itar shark and the blind shark (also used for Brachaelurus waddi). Goto's 2002 morphological analysis of the carpet sharks showed the genus Hemiscyllium as a polytomy, meaning that the phylogenetic relationships between the epaulette shark and its sister species could not be resolved.

== Distribution and habitat ==
The range of the epaulette shark extends from the southern coast of New Guinea to the northern coast of Australia, as far south as Sydney. The Capricorn-Bunker Group of the Great Barrier Reef contains a particularly large population, with thousands estimated to inhabit the reefs around Heron Island alone. The estimated population density of these reefs is approximately 0.3 to 1.2 individuals per 100 square meters. Additionally, there are unsubstantiated reports of this species from Malaysia, Sumatra, and the Solomon Islands. Epaulette sharks are found in shallow water to a maximum depth of 50 m (160 ft), and are often seen in water barely deep enough to cover their bodies. They prefer tidal pools, coral flats, and stands of staghorn coral.

== Description ==
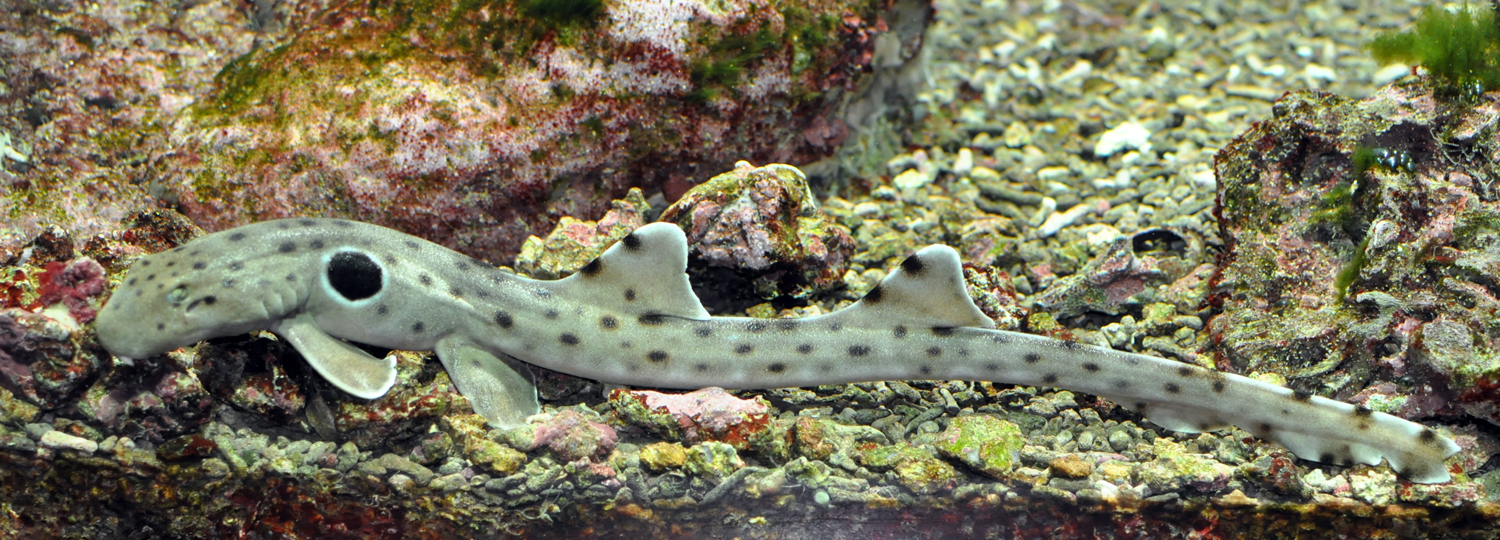
Epaulette sharks are named for the prominent black spot behind their pectoral fins.

The epaulette shark has an elongated body, over half of which is comprised by the slender caudal peduncle. The snout is short and rounded, with the nares placed almost at the tip along with a pair of tiny barbels; there are grooves running from the nares to the mouth. There are 26–35 tooth rows in the upper jaw and 21–32 tooth rows in the lower jaw. The teeth are small, with broad bases and triangular cusps. The eyes are oval in shape and elevated, with a large spiracle below each. The five pairs of gill slits are small, with the fourth and fifth very close together.

The pectoral and pelvic fins are broad and rounded and are thickly muscled. The two similarly sized dorsal fins are placed well back on the body. The anal fin is low and positioned just in front of the caudal fin. The caudal fin has only an upper lobe, which contains a prominent ventral notch near the tip and is angled almost horizontally relative to the body. Adult epaulette sharks are beige to brownish above with many widely spaced brown spots and subtle darker bands. There is a very large black spot ringed in white located behind each pectoral fin; this pair of spots are the origin of this shark's common name. Juveniles have alternating light and dark bands over their body and fins, which break up as they mature. Epaulette sharks are typically 70–90 cm (27.5–35.5 in) long; the maximum reported length is 107 cm (42 in).

== Biology and ecology ==
As an adaptation for navigating its complex reef environment, the epaulette shark moves by seemingly walking, bending its body from side-to-side and pushing off of the substrate with its paddle-shaped pectoral and pelvic fins. Its gait is similar to that of salamanders, an example of convergent evolution. The shark is capable of swimming, but often prefers to walk along the sandy or coral bottom even when the water is deep enough to allow it to swim freely. The cartilaginous supports of the epaulette shark's paired fins are reduced and separated when compared to other sharks, allowing them to be rotated for use as limbs. This mode of locomotion even enables the shark to crawl out of the water to access isolated tidal pools. The gait of the epaulette shark is convergently similar to those of tetrapods such as salamanders, suggesting that the movements needed for walking on land may predate, and perhaps contributed to the evolution of, the first terrestrial vertebrates. Epaulette sharks are largely nocturnal and are most active in low water. They often hide inside or below coral heads, though it is enough for the head to be covered even if the rest of the body is exposed. Sometimes they perch in the open on sandy flats or atop reefs facing into the current, a form of orientation known as rheotaxis that may improve respiration or predator awareness.

Epaulette sharks are preyed upon by larger fishes such as other sharks. Its coloration provides protective camouflage, while its epaulette is speculated to be an eyespot for distracting or deterring predators. Epaulette sharks are almost all parasitized by the praniza (parasitic) juvenile stage of gnathiid isopods. The larvae feed on blood and mostly attach to the skin around the cloaca and the claspers, though they are also found inside the mouth and on the gills. These parasites cause little damage and are not believed to adversely affect the health of the shark. Other parasites of this species include a species of myxosporean in the genus Kudoa, which infests the skeletal muscles, the hemogregarine protozoan Haemogregarina hemiscyllii, which infects the blood, the ostracod Sheina orri, which attaches to the gills, and the nematode Proleptus australis, which infests the stomach.

=== Hypoxia tolerance ===
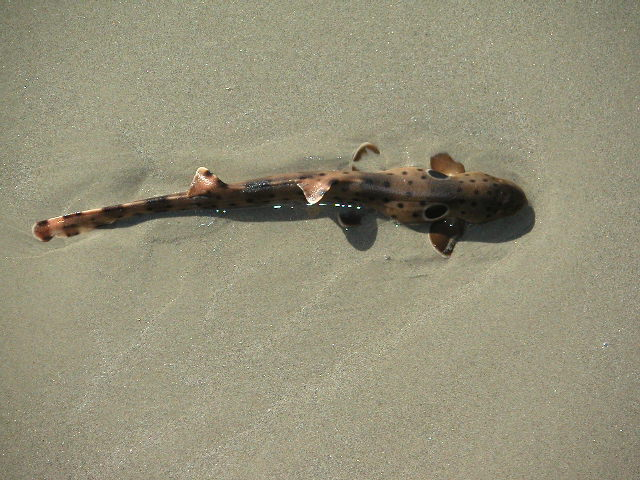
Epaulette sharks can survive for hours with little oxygen, and can clamber over land to reach the nearest suitable area of water.

At night, the shallow reef platforms inhabited by the epaulette shark often become isolated from the ocean by the receding tide. The amount of dissolved oxygen in the pool can drop 80% or more overnight from the combined respiration of all the organisms within the pool. The epaulette shark has evolved to cope with these hypoxic conditions, being able to survive for over three hours in 5% of the atmospheric O_{2} level without losing behavioral responsiveness. In the laboratory, epaulette sharks have survived for an hour without any oxygen at 30 °C (86 °F), which is also unusual in that most animals capable of tolerating oxygen deprivation do so at low temperatures.

The physiological responses of the epaulette shark to low oxygen are mediated by the nucleoside adenosine. In hypoxic conditions, the heart and ventilation rates drop sharply. The shark's blood pressure falls by half as the blood vessels dilate to deliver more blood to the brain and heart. Unlike in bony fishes and tetrapods, the blood flow rate remains constant and there is no elevation of blood glucose levels. The brains of sharks only consume a third as much ATP as those of teleosts. The epaulette shark is able to lower this energy demand further by reducing the metabolism of certain areas of its brain, e.g. keeping the sensory nuclei functional while deactivating the motor nuclei. This allows the shark to supply enough ATP to prevent neuron death, while still remaining alert to its environment.

=== Temperature susceptibility ===
Epaulette shark development rate and fitness are strongly affected by temperature during development. Temperature rises due to climate change are sufficient to weaken the sharks, which risks damage to ecosystems.

=== Feeding ===
The epaulette shark is an opportunistic predator of benthic crustaceans, worms, and small bony fish. Off Heron Island, over 90% of the epaulette shark's diet consists of polychaete worms and crabs, with juveniles taking mostly the former and adults mostly the latter. It hunts most actively at dawn and dusk, though feeding can occur at any time during the day. This shark relies mainly on its olfactory and electroreceptive senses to locate hidden prey. It is capable of sucking prey into its mouth by expanding its muscular buccal cavity. While searching for food, the epaulette shark sometimes turns over debris with its snout or thrusts its head into the sand, swallowing food items while expelling the sand grains through its gill slits. Unlike most sharks, the epaulette shark may chew its food for up to 5–10 minutes. Its teeth can be depressed to form a flat surface for crushing hard-shelled prey.

=== Life history ===
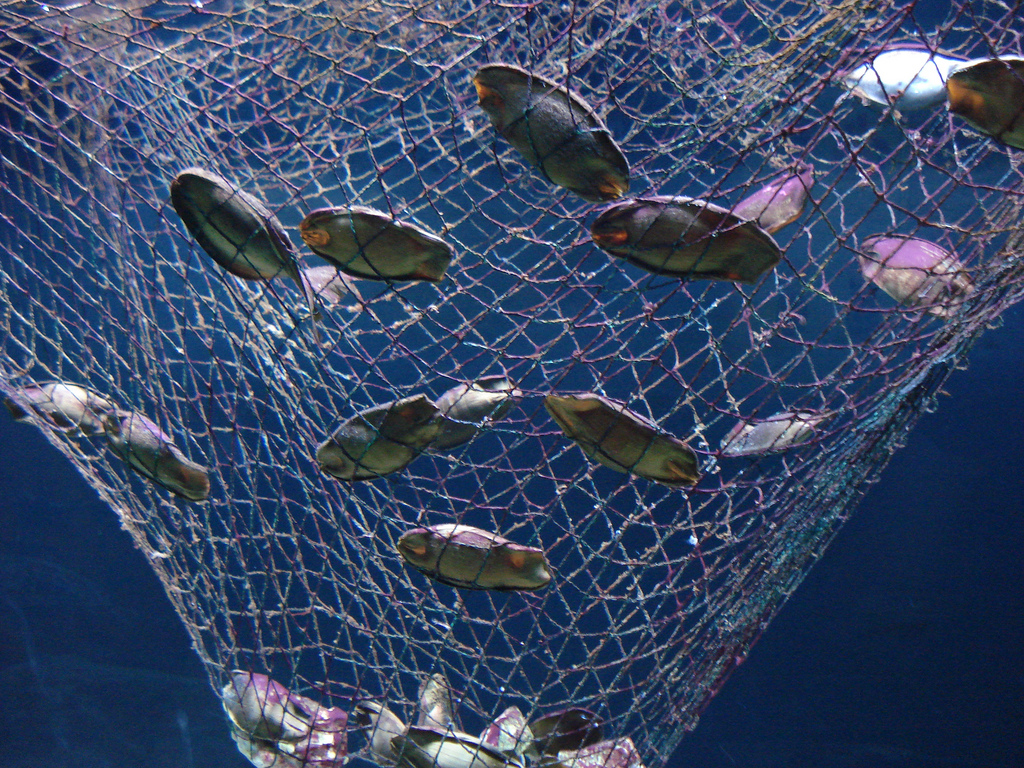
Epaulette shark eggs

Mating in the epaulette shark takes place from July to December, though in captivity reproduction occurs continuously. Courtship may be initiated by the female following and biting the male. The male then holds onto the pectoral fin of the female with his mouth and lies alongside her, while inserting one of his claspers into her cloaca. Copulation lasts about one and a half minutes. Epaulette sharks readily breed in aquariums, even in tanks as small as 135 gallons, but larger tanks are recommended to allow room for the hatched offspring. This species is oviparous, with females depositing eggs from August to December. The female drops the egg capsules two (rarely four) at a time every 14 days, producing a total of 20–50 eggs per year. Each egg case measures 10 cm (3.9 in) long and 4 cm (1.6 in) wide. The young emerge after 120–130 days, at a length of 14–16 cm (5.5–6.5 in). The growth rate of the young is slow at first but increases to about 5 cm (2.0 in) per year after three months. Both males and females mature sexually at a length of 54–64 cm (21.5–25 in), corresponding to an age of at least seven years.

== Human interactions ==
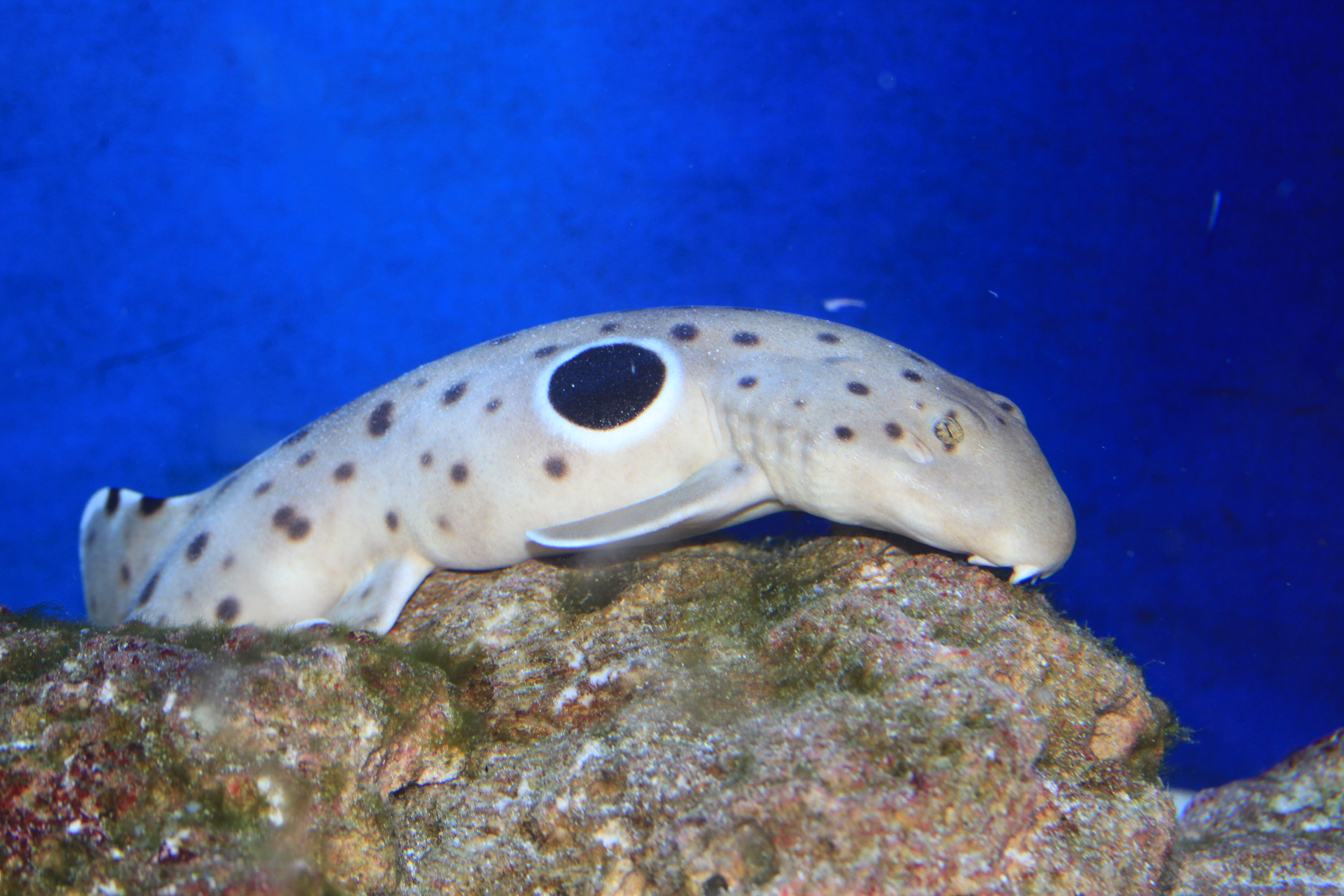
An epaulette shark on display in a public aquarium

Epaulette sharks are harmless to humans, though if handled they may nip their captors. They are easily observed and handled by beachgoers as they move slowly whilst out of water, and show little fear of humans. This species adapts readily to captivity and is displayed by many public aquariums in the United States, Canada, and Australia. In an article for Aquarium Fish Magazine, Scott W. Michael referred to the epaulette shark as "the best shark for the home aquarium." They will breed in captivity, even in tanks as small as 510 L (135 gal), though full-grown sharks are best housed in tanks of 680 L (180 gal) or more. They are not compatible with community tanks as they will eat other fish.

The International Union for Conservation of Nature (IUCN) has assessed the epaulette shark as of Least Concern. This species is common in Australian waters, where it is not captured by either commercial or recreational fisheries, and is minimally affected by collection for the aquarium trade and fishery bycatch. Much of its Australian habitat is encompassed by protected marine parks. Off New Guinea, the epaulette shark has been assessed as Near Threatened, as there it faces habitat degradation, destructive fishing practices, and over-exploitation by artisan fishers.

In 2015, the behaviour of an epaulette shark was filmed in detail by the BBC for the first episode of a new documentary series named Shark, released around the 40th anniversary of Jaws. The documentary shows an epaulette shark's ability to walk over land, and its hunting behaviours in the ebbing tide.
