= 2016 in paleoichthyology =

This list of fossil fishes described in 2016 is a list of new taxa of jawless vertebrates, placoderms, acanthodians, fossil cartilaginous fishes, bony fishes and other fishes of every kind that have been described during the year 2016, as well as other significant discoveries and events related to paleontology of fishes that occurred in the year 2016. The list only includes taxa at the level of genus or species.

== Research ==
- Tullimonstrum gregarium is argued to be a stem-lamprey by McCoy et al. (2016).
- A study of the eye anatomy of Tullimonstrum gregarium is published by Clements et al. (2016).
- New information on the anatomy of the Carboniferous taxa Mayomyzon pieckoensis and Myxinikela siroka is published by Gabbott et al. (2016), who report the presence of melanosomes in their eyes; the authors also conduct a study on the phylogenetic relationships of these species, finding Mayomyzon to be a relative of lampreys and finding Myxinikela to be a relative of hagfish.
- A study on the phylogenetic relationships of Palaeospondylus gunni is published by Hirasawa, Oisi & Kuratani (2016), who interpret it as a probable stem-hagfish.
- New information on the dermal bone histology and phylogenetic relationships of the jawless anaspids, published by Keating & Donoghue (2016), reveal that they are a monophyletic group nested within skeletonizing vertebrates, rather than early relatives of lampreys and hagfish.
- A study on the phylogenetic relationships of early jawed vertebrates is published by Qiao et al. (2016).
- A study on the ontogenetic composition of the Devonian placoderm material known from the Strud quarry (Namur Province, Belgium) is published by Olive et al. (2016), who interpret the Strud locality as representing a placoderm nursery.
- A description of the general anatomy, morphology and histology of dermal elements and the endoskeletal shoulder girdle of three Devonian (Eifelian-Givetian) species of acanthodians known from Scotland (Diplacanthus crassisimus, Diplacanthus tenuistriatus and Rhadinacanthus longispinus) is published by Burrow et al. (2016).
- Fossil tooth of a member of the genus Lagarodus (a cartilaginous fish belonging to the group Euchondrocephali, of uncertain phylogenetic placement within the latter group) is reported for the first time from the Carboniferous of Svalbard by Cuny, Kristensen & Stemmerik (2016).
- A study on the enameloid ultrastructure of the teeth of members of the genus Ptychodus recovered from the Lincoln Limestone of the Greenhorn Formation (Barton County, Kansas, USA) and its implications for the phylogenetic placement of the genus is published by Hoffman, Hageman & Claycomb (2016).
- A specimen of Galeorhinus cuvieri (fossil relative of the school shark) with preserved soft tissues and stomach contents (indicating that it preyed on Eocene relatives of the living barracudas) is described from the Eocene (Ypresian) Monte Bolca site in Italy by Fanti et al. (2016).
- A redescription of the Miocene shark Glyphis pagoda is published by Shimada et al. (2016).
- A study of geographical distribution patterns and global abundance of Carcharocles megalodon from the Miocene to the Pliocene, and a discussion of the possible causes of its extinction, is published by Pimiento et al. (2016).
- A study on the growth history of the teeth of Andreolepis hedei is published by Chen et al. (2016).
- A study on the anatomical diversification of teleosts and holosteans during 160 million years of their evolution (Permian–Early Cretaceous) is published by Clarke, Lloyd & Friedman (2016).
- Specimens of Saurichthys costasquamosus, Saurichthys macrocephalus and Saurichthys paucitrichus with preserved casts of gastrointestinal tract are described by Argyriou et al. (2016).
- A redescription of Ionoscopus petrarojae and a study on the phylogenetic relationships of the species is published by Taverne & Capasso (2016).
- A redescription and a study on the phylogenetic relationships of Dapedium pholidotum, based on new fossil material from the Jurassic (Toarcian) Posidonia Shale (Germany) is published by Thies & Waschkewitz (2016), who name a new order Dapediiformes including the family Dapediidae.
- A redescription and a study on the phylogenetic relationships of the dapediiform species Hemicalypterus weiri is published by Gibson (2016).
- A study on the anatomy of the Carboniferous teleost relative Aetheretmon and its implications for the evolution of tail and caudal fin of vertebrates in published by Sallan (2016).
- A redescription of the anatomy of the Early Cretaceous osteoglossiform Chanopsis lombardi known from the Democratic Republic of the Congo is published by Taverne (2016).
- A specimen of an osteoglossid fish, putatively referred to the species Ridewoodichthys caheni, is described from the Paleocene (Danian) of Angola by Taverne (2016).
- A study on the anatomy and phylogenetic relationships of the ellimmichthyiform Codoichthys carnavalii is published by de Figueiredo & Ribeiro (2016).
- Fossilized hearts are reported in two specimens of Rhacolepis buccalis by Maldanis et al. (2016).
- A phylogenetic study of spiny-rayed teleosts, including Late Cretaceous fossil taxa and that recovers the molecular-based interrelationships with morphological information for the first time, is published by Davesne et al. (2016).
- Meemannia eos, initially classified as a lobe-finned fish, is reinterpreted as an early-diverging ray-finned fish by Lu et al. (2016).
- Description of new skull material of Qingmenodus yui from Pragian of China and a study of phylogenetic relationships of onychodonts is published by Lu et al. (2016).
- Clement et al. (2016) reconstruct the shape of the brain of the Devonian lungfish Rhinodipterus kimberleyensis on the basis of a CT scan of its endocast.
- Virtual cranial endocast of Dipnorhynchus sussmilchi is reconstructed by Clement et al. (2016).

== New taxa ==
=== Jawless vertebrates ===
Name	Novelty	Status	Authors	Age	Unit	Location	Notes	Images
Arianalepis	Gen. et sp. nov	Valid	Hairapetian et al.	Devonian (Famennian)		Australia; Iran	A turiniid thelodont. The type species is Arianalepis megacostata; genus also contains a second, indeterminate species.	
Kodinskaspis	Gen. et sp. nov	Valid	Dzik & Moskalenko	Ordovician (460 Mya)	Mamyry Formation	Russia	A possible relative of Tesakoviaspis concentrica. The type species is Kodinskaspis angarensis.	
Neoturinia	Gen. et comb. nov	Valid	Hairapetian, Blom & Turner	Devonian (Frasnian)		Iran	A turiniid thelodont. The type species is "Turinia" hutkensis Blieck & Goujet (1978).	
Phyllonaspis	Gen. et 3 sp. nov	Valid	Elliott	Early Devonian (late Emsian)	Lost Burro Formation; Sevy Dolomite	United States (California; Nevada; Utah)	A member of Cyathaspididae. The type species is P. laevis; genus also includes P. serratus and P. taphensis.	

=== Placoderms ===
Name	Novelty	Status	Authors	Age	Unit	Location	Notes	Images
Bothriolepis rex	Sp. nov	Valid	Downs et al.	Devonian (Frasnian)	Nordstrand Point Formation	Canada (Nunavut)	A member of Antiarchi.	
Qilinyu	Gen. et sp. nov	Valid	Zhu et al.	Silurian (late Ludlow)	Kuanti Formation	China	The type species is Q. rostrata.	

=== Acanthodians ===
Name	Novelty	Status	Authors	Age	Unit	Location	Notes	Images
Atopacanthus juvai	Sp. nov	Valid	Hairapetian & Burrow	Late Devonian	Bahram Formation	Iran	A member of Ischnacanthiformes; a species of Atopacanthus.	

=== Cartilaginous fishes ===
Name	Novelty	Status	Authors	Age	Unit	Location	Notes	Images
Akaimia myriacuspis	Sp. nov	Valid	Srdic, Duffin & Martill	Middle Jurassic (Callovian)	Peterborough Member of the Oxford Clay Formation	United Kingdom	A carpet shark.	
Coelometlaouia	Gen. et sp. nov	Valid	Engelbrecht et al.	Eocene	La Meseta Formation	Antarctica (Seymour Island)	A carpet shark. Genus includes new species C. pannucae.	
Crassodus	Gen. et sp. nov	Valid	Maisch & Matzke	Early Jurassic (early Toarcian)	Posidonienschiefer Formation	Germany	A member of Hybodontidae. The type species is C. reifi.	
Deltalepis	Gen. et 2 sp. nov	Valid	Andreev et al.	Silurian	Chargat Formation	Mongolia	A relative of Elegestolepis and Ellesmereia. Genus includes new species D. magna and D. parva.	
Haimirichia	Gen. et comb. nov	Valid	Vullo, Guinot & Barbe	Cretaceous		Angola; Egypt; France; Japan; Morocco; Nigeria; Spain; United States	A member of Lamniformes of uncertain phylogenetic placement; a new genus for "Odontaspis" amonensis Cappetta & Case (1975).	
Isanodus nongbualamphuensis	Sp. nov	Valid	Khamha, Cuny & Lauprasert	Early Cretaceous		Thailand	A member of Hybodontiformes, a species of Isanodus.	
Lonchidion derenzii	Sp. nov	Valid	Manzanares et al.	Late Triassic		Spain	A member of Hybodontiformes.	
Megachasma alisonae	Sp. nov	Valid	Shimada & Ward	Late Eocene	Søvind Marl Formation	Denmark	A relative of the megamouth shark.	
Megalolamna	Gen. et sp. nov	Valid	Shimada et al.	Miocene (Aquitanian–Burdigalian)	Chilcatay Formation; Jewett Sand Formation; Oi Formation; O'oshimojo Formation; Pungo River Formation; Uitpa Formation	Colombia; Japan; Peru; United States (California, North Carolina)	A member of Otodontidae. The type species is M. paradoxodon. Pollerspöck & Shimada (2024) subsequently considered the type species to be a junior synonym of "Otodus" serotinus Probst (1879), resulting in a new combination Megalolamna serotinus.	
Notoramphoscyllium	Gen. et sp. nov	Valid	Engelbrecht et al.	Eocene	La Meseta Formation	Antarctica (Seymour Island)	A carpet shark. Genus includes new species N. woodwardi.	
Oligodalatias	Gen. et sp. nov	Valid	Welton	Early Eocene-Miocene	Keasey Formation; Kirker Sandstone; Lillebælt Clay; Pittsburg Bluff Formation	Denmark; France; United States (California; Oregon)	A member of Dalatiidae. The type species is O. jordani.	
Orectolobus ziegenhinei	Sp. nov	Valid	Cappetta & Case	Eocene (Lutetian)	Lisbon Formation	United States (Alabama)	A species of Orectolobus.	
Orthechinorhinus davidae	Sp. nov	Valid	Welton	Early Oligocene	Alsea Formation	United States (Oregon)	Probably a member of Etmopteridae.	
Ossianodus	Gen. et sp. nov	Valid	Ginter	Carboniferous (Gzhelian)	Indian Cave Sandstone	United States (Nebraska)	A member of Hybodontidae. The type species is O. nebraskensis.	
Pristiophorus laevis	Sp. nov	Valid	Engelbrecht et al.	Eocene		Antarctica	A species of Pristiophorus.	
Protosqualus argentinensis	Sp. nov	Valid	Bogan, Agnolin & Novas	Late Cretaceous (Maastrichtian)	Calafate Formation	Argentina	A member of Squaliformes, a species of Protosqualus.	
Rhinoscymnus viridiadamas	Sp. nov	Valid	Welton & Goedert	Oligocene	Lincoln Creek Formation	United States (Washington)	A member of Somniosidae, a species of Rhinoscymnus.	
Scoliodon conecuhensis	Sp. nov	Valid	Cappetta & Case	Eocene (Lutetian)	Lisbon Formation	United States (Alabama)	A species of Scoliodon.	
Solinalepis	Gen. et sp. nov	Valid	Andreev et al.	Ordovician (Sandbian)	Harding Sandstone	United States (Colorado)	A member of Mongolepidida of uncertain phylogenetic placement. The type species is S. levis.	
Somniosus gonzalezi	Sp. nov	Valid	Welton & Goedert	Oligocene	Pysht Formation	United States (Washington)	A member of Somniosidae, a species of Somniosus.	
Sphenacanthus tenuis	Sp. nov	Valid	Ginter	Carboniferous (Gzhelian)	Indian Cave Sandstone	United States (Nebraska)	A member of Sphenacanthidae.	
Squalicorax deckeri	Sp. nov	Valid	Bice & Shimada	Late Cretaceous (Turonian)	Codell Sandstone Member of the Carlile Shale	United States (Kansas)		
Squatina (Squatina) fortemordeo	Sp. nov	Valid	Siversson et al.	Late Cretaceous (early Campanian)	Kristianstad Basin	Sweden	An angel shark.	
Squatina (Squatina) lundegreni	Sp. nov	Valid	Siversson et al.	Late Cretaceous (early Campanian)	Kristianstad Basin	Sweden	An angel shark.	
Synechodus filipi	Sp. nov	Valid	Siversson et al.	Late Cretaceous (early Campanian)	Kristianstad Basin	Sweden	A member of Synechodontiformes, a species of Synechodus.	
Tethylamna	Gen. et sp. et comb. nov	Valid	Cappetta & Case	Eocene (Lutetian-Priabonian)	Lisbon Formation	Egypt; Morocco; Pakistan; United States (Alabama; Georgia (U.S. state))	Genus includes new species T. dunni, as well as "Lamna" twiggsensis Case (1981).	

=== Bony fishes ===
Name	Novelty	Status	Authors	Age	Unit	Location	Notes	Images
Adrianaichthys	Gen. et comb. nov	Valid	Meunier et al.	Late Cretaceous (Cenomanian)	Kem Kem Group	Morocco	A member of Lepisosteiformes; a new genus for "Lepidotes" pankowskii Forey, López-Arbarello & MacLeod (2011).	
"Albulida" ballonensis	Sp. nov	Valid	Nolf	Late Cretaceous (Cenomanian)		France	Possibly a species of Elopothrissus.	
"Albuloideus" provolone	Sp. nov	Valid	Nolf	Late Cretaceous (Cenomanian)		France		
Altamuraichthys	Gen. et sp. nov	Valid	Taverne	Late Cretaceous (Campanian-Maastrichtian)		Italy	A member of Ichthyodectidae. The type species is A. meleleoi.	
Amazonasciaena	Gen. et comb. nov	Valid	Aguilera, Schwarzhans & Béarez	Miocene (Aquitanian to early Burdigalian)	Pirabas Formation	Brazil	A member of Sciaenidae; a new genus for "Sciaenops" rossettiae Aguilera & Schwarzhans (2014).	
Amyzon kishenehnicum	Sp. nov	Valid	Liu, Wilson & Murray	Eocene	Kishenehn Formation	United States (Montana)	A member of Catostomidae.	
"Apogonida" patriarchus	Sp. nov	Valid	Nolf	Late Cretaceous (Cenomanian)		France	Otolith of a fish of uncertain affinities.	
Argentina antarctica	Sp. nov	Valid	Schwarzhans et al.	Eocene (late Ypresian	La Meseta Formation	Antarctica (Seymour Island)	A herring smelt, a species of Argentina.	
Ariomma? astridae	Sp. nov	Valid	Hoedemakers & Schneider	Oligocene (Rupelian)		Germany	Possibly a species of Ariomma.	
Armigatus dalmaticus	Sp. nov	Valid	Murray et al.	Late Cretaceous (Campanian)		Croatia	A clupeomorph belonging to the group Ellimmichthyiformes.	
Askerichthys	Gen. et sp. nov	Valid	Borgen & Nakrem	Late Carboniferous	Tanum Formation	Norway	A member of the family Megalichthyidae. The type species is A. heintzi.	
Atractoscion odeai	Sp. nov	Valid	Aguilera, Schwarzhans & Béarez	Miocene (late Burdigalian to early Langhian)	Cantaure Formation; Castilletes Formation	Colombia; Venezuela	A member of Sciaenidae, a species of Atractoscion	
Axelrodichthys megadromos	Sp. nov	Valid	Cavin, Valentin & Garcia	Late Cretaceous (early Campanian)		France	A mawsoniid coelacanth, a species of Axelrodichthys.	
Balkaria	Gen. et sp. nov	Valid	Bannikov et al.	Eocene		Russia (Kabardino-Balkaria)	A member of Tetraodontiformes belonging to the suborder Tetraodontoidei. The type species is Balkaria histiopterygia.	
'Branchiostegus' brevis	Sp. nov	Valid	Lin, Nolf & Girone in Lin et al.	Eocene (Lutetian)	Aquitaine Basin	France	Possibly a species of Branchiostegus	
Callaus cubaguanus	Sp. nov	Valid	Aguilera, Schwarzhans & Béarez	Late Miocene to late Pliocene	Cubagua Formation	Venezuela	A member of Sciaenidae, a species of Callaus	
Carlomonnius	Gen. et sp. nov	Valid	Bannikov & Carnevale	Eocene (late Ypresian)	Monte Bolca locality	Italy	A member of Gobioidei of uncertain phylogenetic placement. The type species is Carlomonnius quasigobius.	
Cataetyx stringeri	Sp. nov	Valid	Schwarzhans & Aguilera	Late Pliocene to early Pleistocene	Bowden Formation; Moin Formation	Costa Rica; Jamaica	A viviparous brotula; a species of Cataetyx.	
Catutoichthys	Gen. et sp. nov	Valid	Gouiric-Cavalli	Late Jurassic (Tithonian)	Vaca Muerta Formation	Argentina	A member of Caturidae. The type species is C. olsacheri.	
Cepola anderssoni	Sp. nov	Valid	Schwarzhans et al.	Eocene (late Ypresian	La Meseta Formation	Antarctica (Seymour Island)	A bandfish, a species of Cepola.	
Cepola rostislavi	Sp. nov	Valid	Lin, Nolf & Girone in Lin et al.	Eocene (Lutetian)	Aquitaine Basin	France	A species of Cepola	
Ceratodus kranzi	Sp. nov	Valid	Frederickson, Lipka & Cifelli	Early Cretaceous	Potomac Formation	United States (Maryland)	A lungfish, a species of Ceratodus.	
Coelorinchus balushkini	Sp. nov	Valid	Schwarzhans et al.	Eocene (late Ypresian	La Meseta Formation	Antarctica (Seymour Island)	A grenadier, a species of Coelorinchus.	
Coelorinchus nordenskjoeldi	Sp. nov	Valid	Schwarzhans et al.	Eocene (late Ypresian	La Meseta Formation	Antarctica (Seymour Island)	A grenadier, a species of Coelorinchus.	
Ctenoplectus	Gen. et sp. nov	Valid	Close et al.	Eocene (Ypresian)	London Clay Formation	United Kingdom	A member of Tetraodontiformes related to the threetooth puffer. The type species is C. williamsi.	
Cumbaaichthys	Gen. et sp. nov	Valid	Murray	Late Cretaceous (Turonian)		Canada	A member of Polymixiiformes of uncertain phylogenetic placement. The type species is Cumbaaichthys oxyrhynchus.	
Cynoscion latiostialis	Sp. nov	Valid	Aguilera, Schwarzhans & Béarez	Miocene (Tortonian)	Gatun Formation; Urumaco Formation	Panama; Venezuela	A member of Sciaenidae, a species of Cynoscion	
Cynoscion prolixus	Sp. nov	Valid	Aguilera, Schwarzhans & Béarez	Miocene (Tortonian) to late Pliocene	Chagres Formation; Cubagua Formation; Urumaco Formation	Panama; Venezuela	A member of Sciaenidae, a species of Cynoscion	
Cynoscion scitulus	Sp. nov	Valid	Aguilera, Schwarzhans & Béarez	Miocene (Tortonian)	Gatun Formation	Panama	A member of Sciaenidae, a species of Cynoscion	
Diaphus? marambionis	Sp. nov	Valid	Schwarzhans et al.	Eocene (late Ypresian	La Meseta Formation	Antarctica (Seymour Island)	A lanternfish, possibly a species of Diaphus.	
Ebertichthys	Gen. et sp. nov	Valid	Arratia	Late Jurassic		Germany	A teleost related to Ascalabos voithii. The type species is Ebertichthys ettlingensis.	
Eekaulostomus	Gen. et sp. nov	Valid	Cantalice & Alvarado-Ortega	Paleocene (Danian)		Mexico	Originally described as a member of the superfamily Aulostomoidea; subsequently argued to be a member of Syngnathoidea. The type species is E. cuevasae.	
'Elops' miiformis	Sp. nov	Valid	Lin, Nolf & Girone in Lin et al.	Eocene (Lutetian)	Aquitaine Basin	France	Possibly a species of Elops	
Eoengraulis	Gen. et sp. nov	Valid	Marramà & Carnevale	Eocene (late Ypresian)	Monte Bolca locality	Italy	An anchovy. The type species is Eoengraulis fasoloi.	
'Evermannella' razza	Sp. nov	Valid	Lin, Nolf & Girone in Lin et al.	Eocene (Lutetian)	Aquitaine Basin	France	Possibly a species of Evermannella	
Foreyclupea	Gen. et sp. nov	Valid	Vernygora, Murray & Wilson	Early Cretaceous (Albian)	Loon River Formation	Canada (Northwest Territories)	A member of Clupeomorpha, possibly related to Ranulfoichthys dorsonudum and Scutatuspinosus itapagipensis. The type species is Foreyclupea loonensis.	
Francolebias arvernensis	Sp. nov	Valid	Gaudant	Oligocene		France	A relative of Valencia.	
Frodoichthys	Gen. et sp. nov	Valid	Sun et al.	Middle Triassic (Anisian)	Guanling Formation	China	A member of Neopterygii of uncertain phylogenetic placement, showing similarities to Prosantichthys and thus to the halecomorph order Panxianichthyformes. The type species is F. luopingensis.	
Gimlichthys	Gen. et sp. nov	Valid	Sun et al.	Middle Triassic (Anisian)	Guanling Formation	China	A member of Neopterygii of uncertain phylogenetic placement, more similar to ginglymodians than to halecomorphs. The type species is G. dawaziensis.	
Gladiopycnodus byrnei	Sp. nov	Valid	Marramà et al.	Late Cretaceous (Cenomanian)		Lebanon	A member of Pycnodontiformes belonging to the superfamily Coccodontoidea, a species of Gladiopycnodus.	
Habroichthys dolomiticus	Sp. nov	Valid	Tintori, Lombardo & Kustatscher	Middle Triassic (Anisian)		Italy		
'Haemulon' strascinate	Sp. nov	Valid	Lin, Nolf & Girone in Lin et al.	Eocene (Lutetian)	Aquitaine Basin	France	Possibly a species of Haemulon	
Herreraichthys	Gen. et sp. nov	Valid	Alvarado-Ortega et al.	Late Cretaceous (Santonian)		Mexico	A gar. The type species is Herreraichthys coahuilaensis.	
Hoplobrotula? antipoda	Sp. nov	Valid	Schwarzhans et al.	Eocene (late Ypresian	La Meseta Formation	Antarctica (Seymour Island)	A cusk-eel, possibly a species of Hoplobrotula.	
Hoplopteryx dakotaensis	Sp. nov	Valid	Grandstaff & Parris	Late Cretaceous (Turonian)	Carlile Formation	United States (South Dakota)		
Hyporhamphus tatjanchenkoi	Sp. nov	Valid	Bannikov, Carnevale & Kotlyar	Miocene		Russia (Krasnodar Krai)	A halfbeak, a species of Hyporhamphus.	
Igornichthys bohemicus	Sp. nov	Valid	Štamberg	Permian (Asselian)	Vrchlabí Formation	Czech Republic	A ray-finned fish belonging to the group Brookvaliiformes.	
Isopisthus acer	Sp. nov	Valid	Aguilera, Schwarzhans & Béarez	Late Pliocene	Río Banano Formation	Costa Rica	A member of Sciaenidae, a species of Isopisthus	
Khoratichthys	Gen. et sp. nov	Valid	Deesri, Jintasakul & Cavin	Late Jurassic–Early Cretaceous	Phu Kradung Formation	Thailand	A basal member of Lepisosteiformes. The type species is K. gibbus.	
Kooiichthys	Gen. et sp. nov	Valid	Azpelicueta et al.	Miocene	Puerto Madryn Formation	Argentina	A catfish. The type species is Kooiichthys jono.	
Lamprogrammus manzanilla	Sp. nov	Valid	Schwarzhans & Aguilera	Miocene (late Tortonian)	Manzanilla Formation	Trinidad and Tobago (Trinidad)	A cusk-eel; a species of Lamprogrammus.	
Larimus angosturae	Sp. nov	Valid	Aguilera, Schwarzhans & Béarez	Miocene (Tortonian) to Pliocene (Zanclean)	Angostura Formation; Río Banano Formation	Costa Rica; Ecuador	A member of Sciaenidae, a species of Larimus	
Larimus humboldti	Sp. nov	Valid	Aguilera, Schwarzhans & Béarez	Miocene (Burdigalian to early Langhian)	Cantaure Formation; Jimol Formation	Colombia; Venezuela	A member of Sciaenidae, a species of Larimus	
Larimus pandus	Sp. nov	Valid	Aguilera, Schwarzhans & Béarez	Miocene (Tortonian)	Angostura Formation; Gatun Formation	Ecuador; Panama	A member of Sciaenidae, a species of Larimus	
Lepophidium borbonensis	Sp. nov	Valid	Schwarzhans & Aguilera	Miocene (Tortonian and Messinian)	Angostura Formation; Onzole Formation	Ecuador	A cusk-eel; a species of Lepophidium.	
Lepophidium crebrum	Sp. nov	Valid	Schwarzhans & Aguilera	Miocene (Serravallian and Tortonian)	Angostura Formation; Manzanilla Formation; Tamana Formation	Ecuador; Trinidad and Tobago (Trinidad)	A cusk-eel; a species of Lepophidium.	
Lepophidium gentilis	Sp. nov	Valid	Schwarzhans & Aguilera	Miocene (Tortonian)	Gatun Formation	Panama	A cusk-eel; a species of Lepophidium.	
Lepophidium leai	Sp. nov	Valid	Schwarzhans & Aguilera	Late Pliocene	Cubagua Formation	Venezuela	A cusk-eel; a species of Lepophidium.	
Lepophidium limulum	Sp. nov	Valid	Schwarzhans & Aguilera	Miocene (Messinian)	Onzole Formation	Ecuador	A cusk-eel; a species of Lepophidium.	
Lepophidium refugum	Sp. nov	Valid	Schwarzhans & Aguilera	Early Pliocene	Cubagua Formation	Venezuela	A cusk-eel; a species of Lepophidium.	
Leptolumamia	Gen. et sp. nov.	Valid	Bannikov & Fraser	Lower Eocene, upper Ypresian	North-eastern Italy, Monte Bolca locality, Monte Postale site	Italy	A new genus and species of cardinalfish (Percomorpha, Apogonidae). The type species is L. vetula.	
'Liopropoma' sculpta	Sp. nov	Valid	Lin, Nolf & Girone in Lin et al.	Eocene (Lutetian)	Aquitaine Basin	France	Possibly a species of Liopropoma	
Macruronus eastmani	Sp. nov	Valid	Schwarzhans et al.	Eocene	La Meseta Formation	Antarctica (Seymour Island); Australia	A member of Merlucciidae, a species of Macruronus.	
Malacanthus carosii	Sp. nov	Valid	Carnevale	Miocene (Badenian)	Leitha Limestone	Austria	A species of Malacanthus.	
Megalichthys syndentolaminaris	Sp. nov	Valid	Borgen & Nakrem	Carboniferous		United Kingdom	A member of the family Megalichthyidae.	
Melamphaes acanthifer	Sp. nov	Valid	Lin, Nolf & Girone in Lin et al.	Eocene (Lutetian)	Aquitaine Basin	France	A species of Melamphaes	
Nebris dioneae	Sp. nov	Valid	Aguilera, Schwarzhans & Béarez	Miocene (Tortonian)	Urumaco Formation	Venezuela	A member of Sciaenidae, a species of Nebris	
'Neobythites' auribatianus	Sp. nov	Valid	Lin, Nolf & Girone in Lin et al.	Eocene (Lutetian)	Aquitaine Basin	France	Possibly a species of Neobythites	
'Neobythites' bozzolo	Sp. nov	Valid	Lin, Nolf & Girone in Lin et al.	Eocene (Lutetian)	Aquitaine Basin	France	A cusk-eel. Originally described as a possible species of Neobythites, but subsequently transferred to the genus Pronobythites by Schwarzhans & Nielsen (2023).	
Neobythites huddlestoni	Sp. nov	Valid	Schwarzhans & Aguilera	Miocene (late Langhian)	Brasso Formation	Trinidad and Tobago (Trinidad)	A cusk-eel; a species of Neobythites.	
'Neobythites' leonardi	Sp. nov	Valid	Lin, Nolf & Girone in Lin et al.	Eocene (Lutetian)	Aquitaine Basin	France	A cusk-eel. Originally described as a possible species of Neobythites, but subsequently transferred to the genus Pronobythites by Schwarzhans & Nielsen (2023).	
Neoscopelus navicularis	Sp. nov	Valid	Lin, Nolf & Girone in Lin et al.	Eocene (Lutetian)	Aquitaine Basin	France	A species of Neoscopelus	
Nezumia teoulerensis	Sp. nov	Valid	Lin, Nolf & Girone in Lin et al.	Eocene (Lutetian)	Aquitaine Basin	France	A species of Nezumia	
Notoberyx	Gen. et sp. et comb. nov	Valid	Schwarzhans et al.	Early Eocene	La Meseta Formation	Antarctica (Seymour Island); Denmark	A slimehead. The type species is Notoberyx cionei; genus also includes Notoberyx madseni (Schwarzhans, 2007).	
Occitanichthys	Gen. et sp. nov	Valid	López-Arbarello & Wencker	Late Jurassic (Tithonian)		France	A member of Semionotiformes belonging to the family Callipurbeckiidae. The type species is Occitanichthys canjuersensis.	
Ogilbichthys dariensis	Sp. nov	Valid	Schwarzhans & Aguilera	Miocene (early Tortonian)	Tuira Formarion	Panama	A viviparous brotula; a species of Ogilbichthys.	
Oligoremora	Gen. et sp. nov	Valid	Micklich et al.	Oligocene		Germany	A remora. The type species is Oligoremora rhenana.	
Oncorhynchus belli	Sp. nov	Valid	Stearley & Smith	Miocene	Truckee Formation	United States (Nevada)	A species of Oncorhynchus.	
Oncorhynchus rastellus	Sp. nov	Valid	Stearley & Smith	Miocene	Chalk Hills Formation	United States (Idaho)	A species of Oncorhynchus.	
Ophidion bowdenensis	Sp. nov	Valid	Schwarzhans & Aguilera	Late Pliocene	Bowden Formation	Jamaica	A cusk-eel; a species of Ophidion.	
Ophidion pauxillicauda	Sp. nov	Valid	Schwarzhans & Aguilera	Middle Pleistocene	Swan Cay Formation	Panama	A cusk-eel; a species of Ophidion.	
Ophidion sporoformis	Sp. nov	Valid	Schwarzhans & Aguilera	Miocene (Tortonian)	Angostura Formation	Ecuador	A cusk-eel; a species of Ophidion.	
Ophioscion amphiamericanus	Sp. nov	Valid	Aguilera, Schwarzhans & Béarez	Miocene (Tortonian and Messinian)	Angostura Formation; Cercado Formation	Dominican Republic; Ecuador	A member of Sciaenidae, a species of Ophioscion.	
Ophioscion inflaticauda	Sp. nov	Valid	Aguilera, Schwarzhans & Béarez	Miocene (late Tortonian)	Manzanilla Formation	Trinidad and Tobago (Trinidad)	A member of Sciaenidae, a species of Ophioscion.	
Ophioscion transitivus	Sp. nov	Valid	Aguilera, Schwarzhans & Béarez	Miocene (late Burdigalian to Langhian)	Baitoa Formation; Brasso Formation	Dominican Republic; Trinidad and Tobago (Trinidad)	A member of Sciaenidae, a species of Ophioscion.	
'Ophichthus' mignolo	Sp. nov	Valid	Lin, Nolf & Girone in Lin et al.	Eocene (Lutetian)	Aquitaine Basin	France	Possibly a species of Ophichthus	
Orthogonikleithrus francogalliensis	Sp. nov	Valid	Konwert	Late Jurassic		France	A teleost belonging to the family Orthogonikleithridae, a species of Orthogonikleithrus.	
Palaeomacrosemius	Sp. nov	Valid	Ebert, Lane & Kölbl-Ebert	Late Jurassic (late Kimmeridgian to early Tithonian)		France; Germany	A member of Macrosemiidae. Genus includes new species P. thiollieri.	
Palimphemus seymourensis	Sp. nov	Valid	Schwarzhans et al.	Eocene (late Ypresian	La Meseta Formation	Antarctica (Seymour Island)	A member of Gadidae, a species of Palimphemus.	
"Paraulopida" applanata	Sp. nov	Valid	Nolf	Late Cretaceous (Cenomanian)		France	Possibly a species of Paraulopus.	
Pavarottia maiseyi	Sp. nov.	Valid	Bannikov	Eocene (late Ypresian)	Monte Bolca locality	Italy	A member of Percoidei of uncertain phylogenetic placement.	
Peltopleurus nitidus	Sp. nov	Valid	Xu & Ma	Middle Triassic (Anisian)		China		
Pentanogmius fritschi	Sp. nov	Valid	Shimada	Late Cretaceous (late Cenomanian–early Turonian)	Britton Formation	United States (Texas)	A member of Tselfatiiformes, a species of Pentanogmius.	
'Perca' lactarioides	Sp. nov	Valid	Lin, Nolf & Girone in Lin et al.	Eocene (Lutetian)	Aquitaine Basin	France	Possibly a species of Perca	
'Perca' meiformis	Sp. nov	Valid	Lin, Nolf & Girone in Lin et al.	Eocene (Lutetian)	Aquitaine Basin	France	Possibly a species of Perca	
"Percoideus" ambassoides	Sp. nov	Valid	Nolf	Late Cretaceous (Cenomanian)		France	Otolith of a fish of uncertain affinities.	
Pterothrissus ciabatta	Sp. nov	Valid	Nolf	Late Cretaceous (Cenomanian)		France	A species of Pterothrissus	
Phractocephalus ivy	Sp. nov	Valid	Azpelicueta & Cione	Miocene (Tortonian)	Ituzaingó Formation	Argentina	A member of the family Pimelodidae. Originally described as a species of Phractocephalus; Bogan & Agnolín (2019) transferred this species to the genus Steindachneridion.	
Plagioscion ultimus	Sp. nov	Valid	Aguilera, Schwarzhans & Béarez	Pliocene	Cubagua Formation; Springvale Formation	Trinidad and Tobago (Trinidad); Venezuela	A member of Sciaenidae, a species of Plagioscion	
Pleuropholis cisnerosorum	Sp. nov	Valid	Alvarado-Ortega & Brito	Late Jurassic	Sabinal Formation	Mexico		
Polycirrhus jaramilloi	Sp. nov	Valid	Aguilera, Schwarzhans & Béarez	Miocene (Burdigalian to Langhian)	Cantaure Formation; Castilletes Formation; Jimol Formation	Colombia; Venezuela	A member of Sciaenidae, a species of Polycirrhus	
Polycirrhus mustus	Sp. nov	Valid	Aguilera, Schwarzhans & Béarez	Miocene (Burdigalian to Langhian)	Cantaure Formation; Castilletes Formation; Jimol Formation	Colombia; Venezuela	A member of Sciaenidae, a species of Polycirrhus	
Protonebris	Gen. et sp. nov	Valid	Aguilera, Schwarzhans & Béarez	Miocene (Aquitanian to early Burdigalian)	Castillo Formation	Venezuela	A member of Sciaenidae. The type species is Protonebris sanchezi	
Ptychoceratodus cuyanus	Sp. nov	Valid	Agnolín et al.	Late Triassic (Carnian)	Potrerillos Formation	Argentina	A lungfish.	
Rhinconichthys purgatorensis	Sp. nov	Valid	Schumacher et al.	Late Cretaceous (middle Turonian)	Carlile Shale	United States (Colorado)	A member of Pachycormiformes, a species of Rhinconichthys.	
Rhinconichthys uyenoi	Sp. nov	Valid	Schumacher et al.	Late Cretaceous (Cenomanian)	Mikasa Formation	Japan	A member of Pachycormiformes, a species of Rhinconichthys.	
Saurichthys dianneae	Sp. nov	Valid	Maxwell et al.	Middle Triassic (Anisian)	Vossenveld Formation	Netherlands		
Saurida trompensis	Sp. nov	Valid	Lin, Nolf & Girone in Lin et al.	Eocene (Lutetian)	Aquitaine Basin	France	A species of Saurida	
'Scopelarchus' gnocco	Sp. nov	Valid	Lin, Nolf & Girone in Lin et al.	Eocene (Lutetian)	Aquitaine Basin	France	Possibly a species of Scopelarchus	
Silurus spinosus	Sp. nov	Valid	Kovalchuk & Ferraris	Late Miocene (late Sarmatian)		Ukraine	A catfish; a species of Silurus.	
Stellifer abbreviatus	Sp. nov	Valid	Aguilera, Schwarzhans & Béarez	Late Pliocene	Río Banano Formation	Costa Rica	A member of Sciaenidae, a species of Stellifer.	
Stellifer acerbus	Sp. nov	Valid	Aguilera, Schwarzhans & Béarez	Miocene (late Tortonian)	Manzanilla Formation	Trinidad and Tobago (Trinidad)	A member of Sciaenidae, a species of Stellifer.	
Stellifer bicornutus	Sp. nov	Valid	Aguilera, Schwarzhans & Béarez	Late Pliocene	Río Banano Formation	Costa Rica	A member of Sciaenidae, a species of Stellifer.	
Stellifer depressifrons	Sp. nov	Valid	Aguilera, Schwarzhans & Béarez	Miocene (late Burdigalian to Langhian)	Cantaure Formation	Venezuela	A member of Sciaenidae, a species of Stellifer.	
Stellifer onzole	Sp. nov	Valid	Aguilera, Schwarzhans & Béarez	Miocene (Messinian)	Onzole Formation	Ecuador	A member of Sciaenidae, a species of Stellifer.	
Ticinolepis	Gen. et 2 sp. nov	Valid	López-Arbarello et al.	Middle Triassic (Ladinian)	Besano Formation; Meride Limestone	Switzerland	A member of Holostei of uncertain phylogenetic placement. The type species is T. longaeva; genus also includes T. crassidens.	
'Trachyrincus' iocosus	Sp. nov	Valid	Lin, Nolf & Girone in Lin et al.	Eocene (Lutetian)	Aquitaine Basin	France	Possibly a species of Trachyrincus	
Turboscinetes	Gen. et comb. nov	Valid	Ebert	Late Jurassic		France; Germany	A member of the family Pycnodontidae. The type species is "Pycnodus" egertoni Thiollière (1852).	
Umbrina abbreviata	Sp. nov	Valid	Aguilera, Schwarzhans & Béarez	Miocene (late Burdigalian to early Langhian)	Castilletes Formation	Colombia	A member of Sciaenidae, a species of Umbrina	
Umbrina bananensis	Sp. nov	Valid	Aguilera, Schwarzhans & Béarez	Pliocene	Cayo Agua Formation; Río Banano Formation	Costa Rica; Panama	A member of Sciaenidae, a species of Umbrina	
Umbrina laxa	Sp. nov	Valid	Aguilera, Schwarzhans & Béarez	Miocene (late Burdigalian to early Langhian)	Castilletes Formation	Colombia	A member of Sciaenidae, a species of Umbrina	
Umbrina opima	Sp. nov	Valid	Aguilera, Schwarzhans & Béarez	Late Miocene and early Pliocene	Chucunaque Formation; Cubagua Formation; Gatún Formation; Tuira Formation	Panama; Venezuela	A member of Sciaenidae, a species of Umbrina	
Umbrina sublima	Sp. nov	Valid	Aguilera, Schwarzhans & Béarez	Late Miocene and early Pliocene	Cayo Agua Formation; Cubagua Formation	Panama; Venezuela	A member of Sciaenidae, a species of Umbrina	
Umbrina surda	Sp. nov	Valid	Aguilera, Schwarzhans & Béarez	Late Miocene (Tortonian)	Angostura Formation	Ecuador	A member of Sciaenidae, a species of Umbrina	
Unicachichthys	Gen. et sp. nov	Valid	Díaz-Cruz, Alvarado-Ortega & Carbot-Chanona	Late Cretaceous (Cenomanian)		Mexico	A member of Aulopiformes belonging to the family Enchodontidae. The type species is Unicachichthys multidentata.	
Venusichthys	Gen. et sp. nov	Valid	Xu & Zhao	Middle Triassic (Anisian)	Guanling Formation	China	A stem-neopterygian. The type species is Venusichthys comptus.	
Whiteia oishii	Sp. nov	Valid	Yabumoto & Brito	Triassic		Indonesia	A coelacanth.	
Wilsonichthys	Gen. et sp. nov	Valid	Murray et al.	Late Cretaceous (Maastrichtian	Scollard Formation	Canada (Alberta)	A member of Osteoglossomorpha. The type species is Wilsonichthys aridinsulensis.	
Xenotolithus semiostialis	Sp. nov	Valid	Aguilera, Schwarzhans & Béarez	Miocene (late Burdigalian to early Langhian)	Brasso Formation	Trinidad and Tobago (Trinidad)	A member of Sciaenidae belonging to the subfamily Stelliferinae, a species of Xenotolithus.	
Xenotolithus semiostialis	Sp. nov	Valid	Aguilera, Schwarzhans & Béarez	Miocene (Messinian) and early Pliocene	Gros Morne Formation; Manzanilla Formation	Trinidad and Tobago (Trinidad)	A member of Sciaenidae belonging to the subfamily Stelliferinae, a species of Xenotolithus.	
Zenion mattaccino	Sp. nov	Valid	Lin, Nolf & Girone in Lin et al.	Eocene (Lutetian)	Aquitaine Basin	France	A species of Zenion	
Zenion vetustus	Sp. nov	Valid	Lin, Nolf & Girone in Lin et al.	Eocene (Lutetian)	Aquitaine Basin	France	A species of Zenion	
