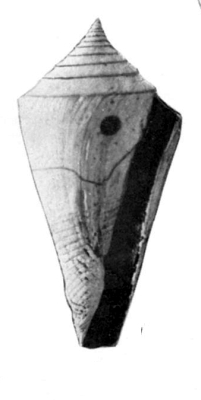
- Original image of a shell of Conasprella imitator

Scientific classification
- Kingdom: Animalia
- Phylum: Mollusca
- Class: Gastropoda
- Subclass: Caenogastropoda
- Order: Neogastropoda
- Superfamily: Conoidea
- Family: Conidae
- Genus: Conasprella
- Species: C. imitator

Binomial name
- Conasprella imitator (A. P. Brown & Pilsbry, 1911)

Synonyms
- †Conus dalli Toula, 1911 (invalid: junior homonym of Conus dalli Stearns, 1873); † Conus imitator A. P. Brown & Pilsbry, 1911

= Conasprella imitator =

Extinct species of gastropod

Conasprella imitator is an extinct species of sea snail, a marine gastropod mollusk in the family Conidae, the cone snails and their allies.

== Description ==
The length of the shell attains 35 mm, its diameter 12 mm.

(Original description) The cone is about twice as long as wide and contains 12 whorls. The spire forms about one fourth of the length. The spire is concave and acuminate in the upper third. The first 3 whorls are smooth, the next 4 or 5 whorls having a smooth carina projecting above the suture, the first 2½ of them tuberculate, after which the carina is smooth. The following whorls are less steeply sloping, very slightly concave, marked with fine growth lines and a few weak spiral striae, slightly prominent at the sutures. The body whorl is acutely carinate, the slope below the angle almost straight, but just perceptibly convex in the upper, concave in the lower half, which is sculptured with about 16 rather strong spiral cords. The outer lip arches strongly forward and is deeply retracted at the upper end.

== Distribution ==
Fossils of this marine species were found in the Gatun Formation, Panama.
