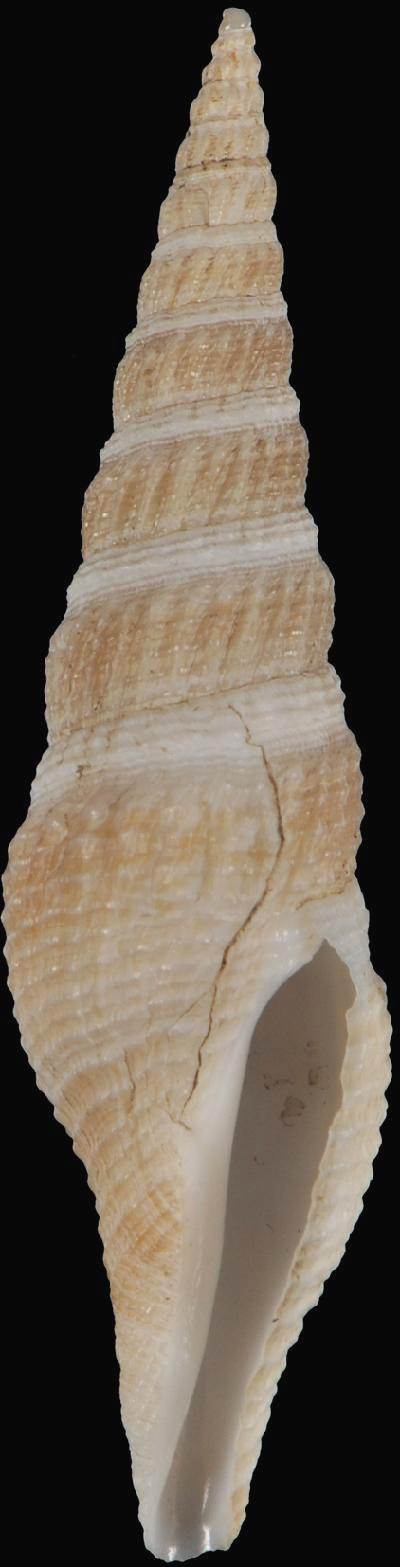
- Shell of Hindsiclava consors (specimen at MNHN, Paris)

Scientific classification
- Kingdom: Animalia
- Phylum: Mollusca
- Class: Gastropoda
- Subclass: Caenogastropoda
- Order: Neogastropoda
- Superfamily: Conoidea
- Family: Pseudomelatomidae
- Genus: Hindsiclava
- Species: H. consors

Binomial name
- Hindsiclava consors (Sowerby I, 1850)

Synonyms
- Crassispira consors Pflug, 1961; Crassispira (Hindsiclava) consors consors Woodring, 1970; Pleurotoma consors G.B. Sowerby I, 1850; Turris (Crassispira) consors Rutsch, 1934

= Hindsiclava consors =

Species of gastropod

Hindsiclava consors is a species of sea snail, a marine gastropod mollusk in the family Pseudomelatomidae, the turrids, and allies.

== Description ==
The length of the shell attains 40 mm.

== Distribution ==
This marine species occurs off the coast of Venezuela. Fossils have been found in the Gurabo Formation, Santo Domingo, and in the Bowden Formation, Jamaica; Springvale Formation, Trinidad; Punta Gavilan Formation, Venezuela; Limon Formation, Costa Rica, and in the Gatun Formation, Costa Rica, and Panama.
