= Orectolobus ziegenhinei =

Orectolobus ziegenhinei Temporal range: Lutetian

Scientific classification
- Kingdom: Animalia
- Phylum: Chordata
- Class: Chondrichthyes
- Subclass: Elasmobranchii
- Division: Selachii
- Order: Orectolobiformes
- Family: Orectolobidae
- Genus: Orectolobus
- Species: †O. ziegenhinei

Binomial name
- †Orectolobus ziegenhinei Cappetta & Case, 2016

Extinct species of shark

Orectolobus ziegenhinei is an extinct species of orectolobid chondrichthyan in the genus Orectolobus that lived during the Lutetian stage of the Eocene epoch.

== Distribution ==
Orectolobus ziegenhinei is known from fossils discovered in the Lisbon Formation in Andalusia in Covington County, Alabama.
