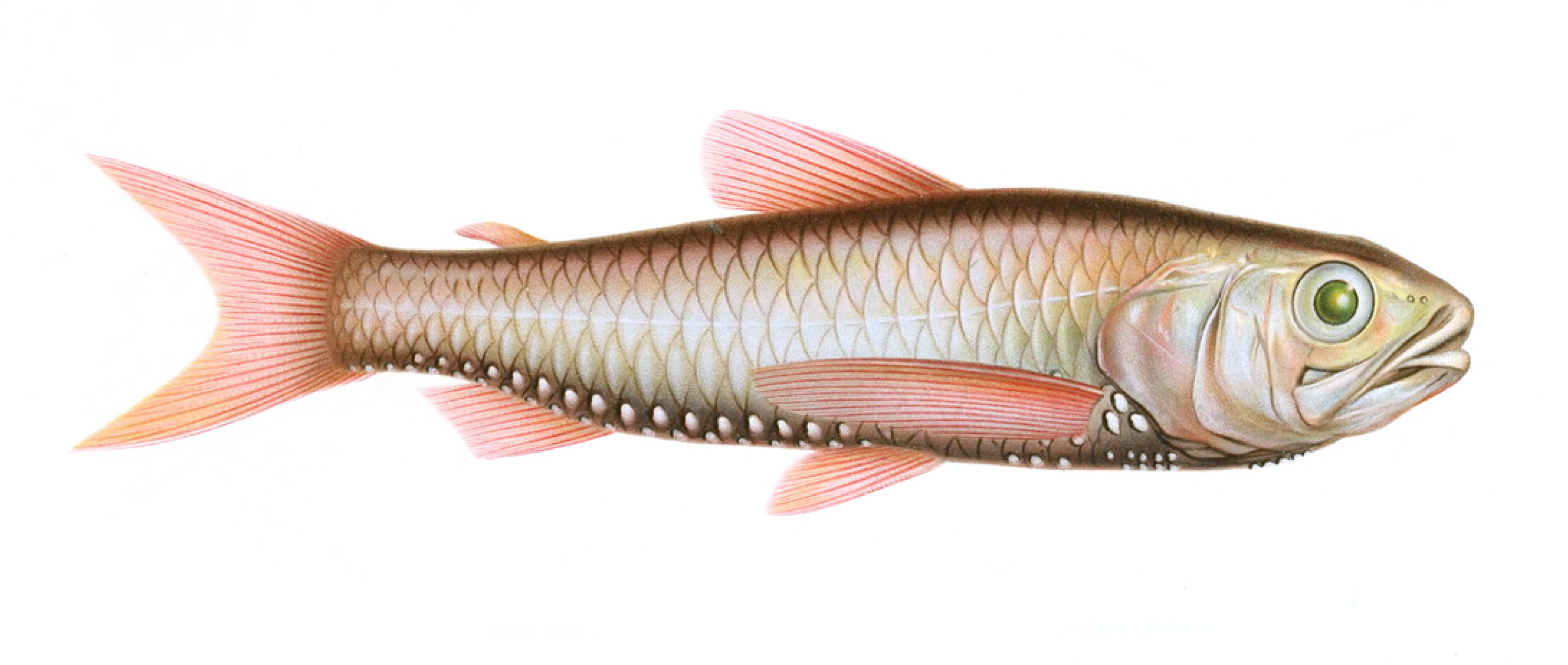

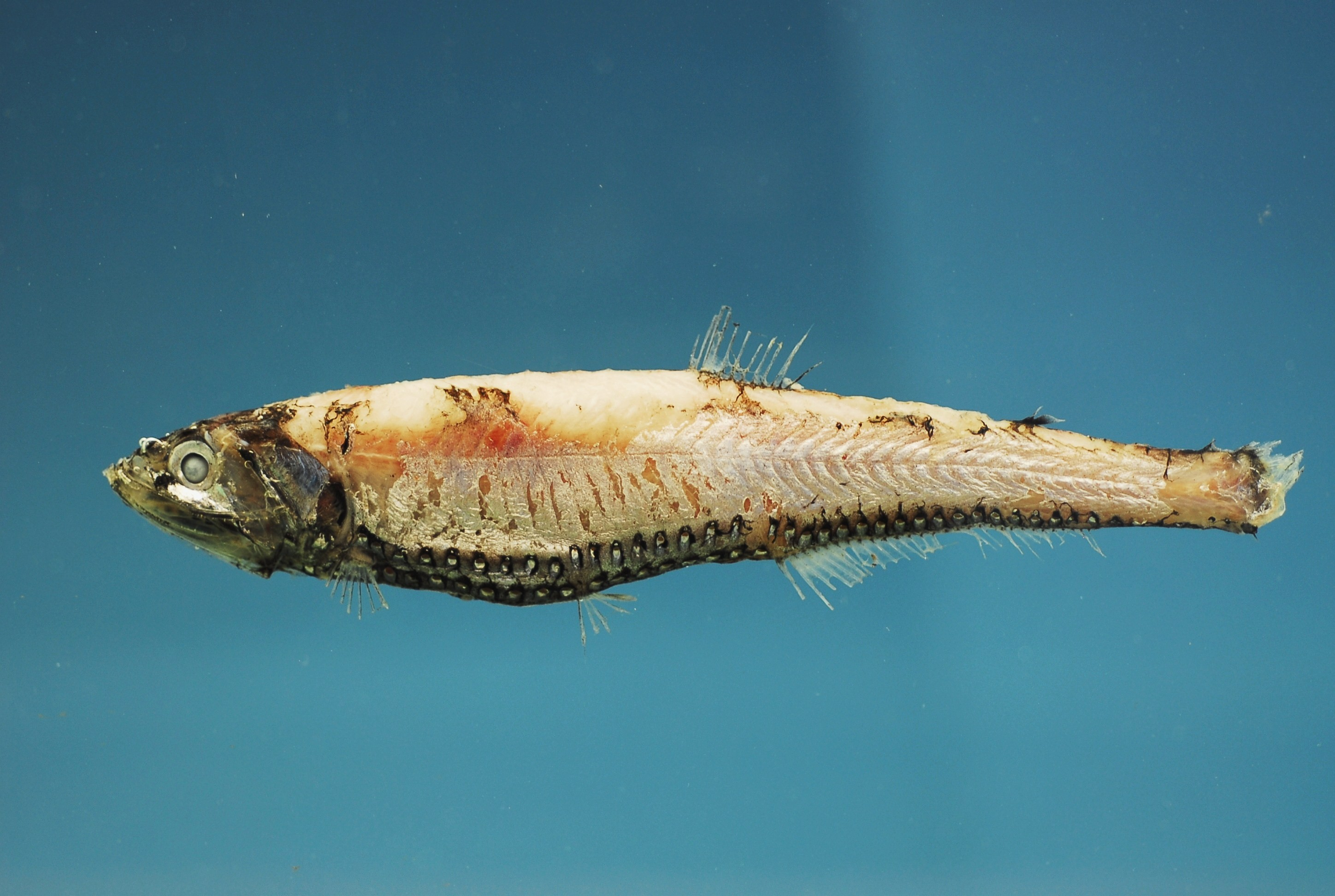

Scientific classification
- Kingdom: Animalia
- Phylum: Chordata
- Class: Actinopterygii
- Division: Teleostei
- Order: Myctophiformes
- Family: Neoscopelidae
- Genus: Neoscopelus
- Species: N. macrolepidotus

Binomial name
- Neoscopelus macrolepidotus Johnson, 1863

= Neoscopelus macrolepidotus =

Species of fish

Neoscopelus macrolepidotus, also known as a large-scaled lantern fish, is a species of small mesopelagic or bathypelagic fish of the family Neoscopelidae, which contains six species total along three genera. The family Neoscopelidae is one of the two families of the order Myctophiformes. Neoscopelidae can be classified by the presence of an adipose fin. The presence of photophores, or light-producing organs, further classify the species into the genus Neoscopelus. N. macrolepidotus tends to be mesopelagic until the individuals become large adults, which is when they settle down to the bathypelagic zone.

The species Neoscopelus macrolepidotus is described as having a dark grey ventral surface, a greyish-silver head, pinkish-red fins, and rows of photophores along the ventral portion of the body and along the sides of the tongue. These photophores produce and emit light in the process of bioluminescence. The species generally does not exceed 25 cm in length and is found exclusively in marine environments, along various parts of the Atlantic, Indian and Pacific Oceans on continental shelves.

== Range ==
Neoscopelus macrolepidotus was originally discovered at Madeira, an autonomous region of Portugal, by English naturalist James Yate Johnson in 1863. Madeira is an archipelago, or island chain, located southwest of Portugal's mainland. After this initial species discovery, N. macrolepidotus was documented in various oceans and regions around the world, reaching as far as 51°N latitude. The majority of the species, however, lives in tropical and subtropical regions, not exceeding 45° latitude in the Northern and Southern Hemispheres. The species also lives a majority of its life between depths of 300 and 1100 m, which most directly correlates to the mesopelagic, or intermediate depths of the sea. Since the mesopelagic zone allows some light penetration, one of the biggest limiting factors of the fish population in this zone is predation. This limiting factor is especially present in the daytime, when more light is penetrating the water column and there is generally more visibility.

== Adaptations and behavior ==
Marine organisms in the mesopelagic zone must adapt to the environmental and behavioral constraints present as light is diminished. These constraints force species to use various senses, such as sight and smell, in order to navigate and survive. For instance, Neoscopelus macrolepidetus and other closely related lanternfishes are evolutionarily fit to have greater visual capabilities in the mesopelagic due to the presence of larger eyes. These larger eyes help increase sensitivity to the light reflected through the water column above and the light of other bioluminescent organisms. The presence of a larger mouth with a posteriorly expanded jaw also helps aid in feeding.

The known feeding habits of the Neoscopelus genera are limited, however, a common behavior of micronekton is diel vertical migration. This type of migration includes a daily routine of navigating through the bathypelagic zone during the day and swimming up to the mesopelagic at night. This behavior is an attempt to avoid large-scale predators during the day while having the ability to feed on smaller organisms, such as zooplankton, at night. Since the species Neoscopelus macrolepidotus has rows of small teeth, the feeding capabilities can be expanded to other types of micronekton, such as smaller fishes or crustaceans.

== Bioluminescence ==
As mentioned before, Neoscopelus macrolepidotus contains photophores that allow the emission of light. These bioluminescent structures were first exclusively found on the ventral surface of the body, until a scientific study conducted by Seishi Kuwabara examined photophores found in the tongues of individuals belonging to the species Neoscopelus macrolepidotus and Neoscopelus microchir. Neoscopelus microchir is the second species comprising the genus Neoscopelus. Prior to the experiment, the species Neoscopelus microchir was distinguished from Neoscopelus macrolepidotus by having more photophores and a larger head and pectoral fin. Based on Kuwabara's experiments, there were larger photophores and more of them in the tongues of N. microchir, which allowed for another distinguishing factor from the otherwise extremely similar species. These morphological differences in species are subtle, which can make it difficult to distinguish the difference between the species N. macrolepidotus and N. microchir when working in the field.

In terms of functional use, the photophores on the ventral surface of the fish are most likely used to aid in ventral counter-illumination. This is a form of camouflage that fish use to match the intensity of light in the mesopelagic zone in order to hide their silhouettes from larger predators below. This camouflage can be seen as a necessity for species such as Neoscopelus macrolepidotus, since their ventral surface is darker and therefore their body contrasts more with the downwelling light from above. The use of the photophores found in their tongues is unknown, but could be a possible aid in feeding and species recognition in the dim mesopelagic and the dark bathypelagic. The bioluminescence is done endogenously, meaning that light is produced from their own bodies instead of from symbiotic bacteria in photophores.
