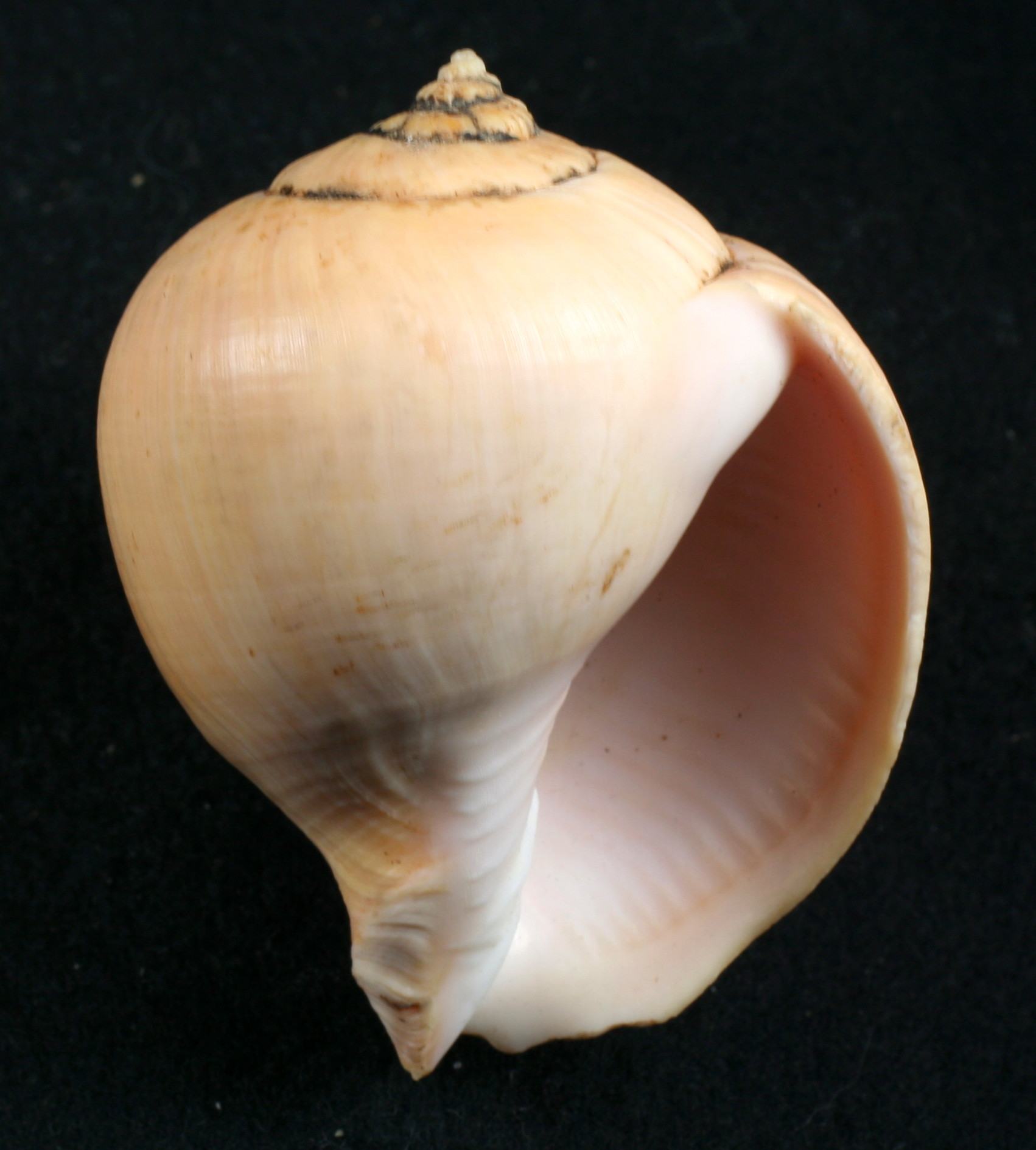
- Apertural view of shell of Pyruclia solida (G.B. Sowerby I, 1832)

Scientific classification
- Kingdom: Animalia
- Phylum: Mollusca
- Class: Gastropoda
- Subclass: Caenogastropoda
- Order: Neogastropoda
- Family: Cancellariidae
- Genus: Pyruclia
- Species: P. solida

Binomial name
- Pyruclia solida (G.B. Sowerby I, 1832)

= Pyruclia solida =

Species of gastropod

Pyruclia solida is a species of sea snail, a marine gastropod mollusk in the family Cancellariidae, the nutmeg snails.
