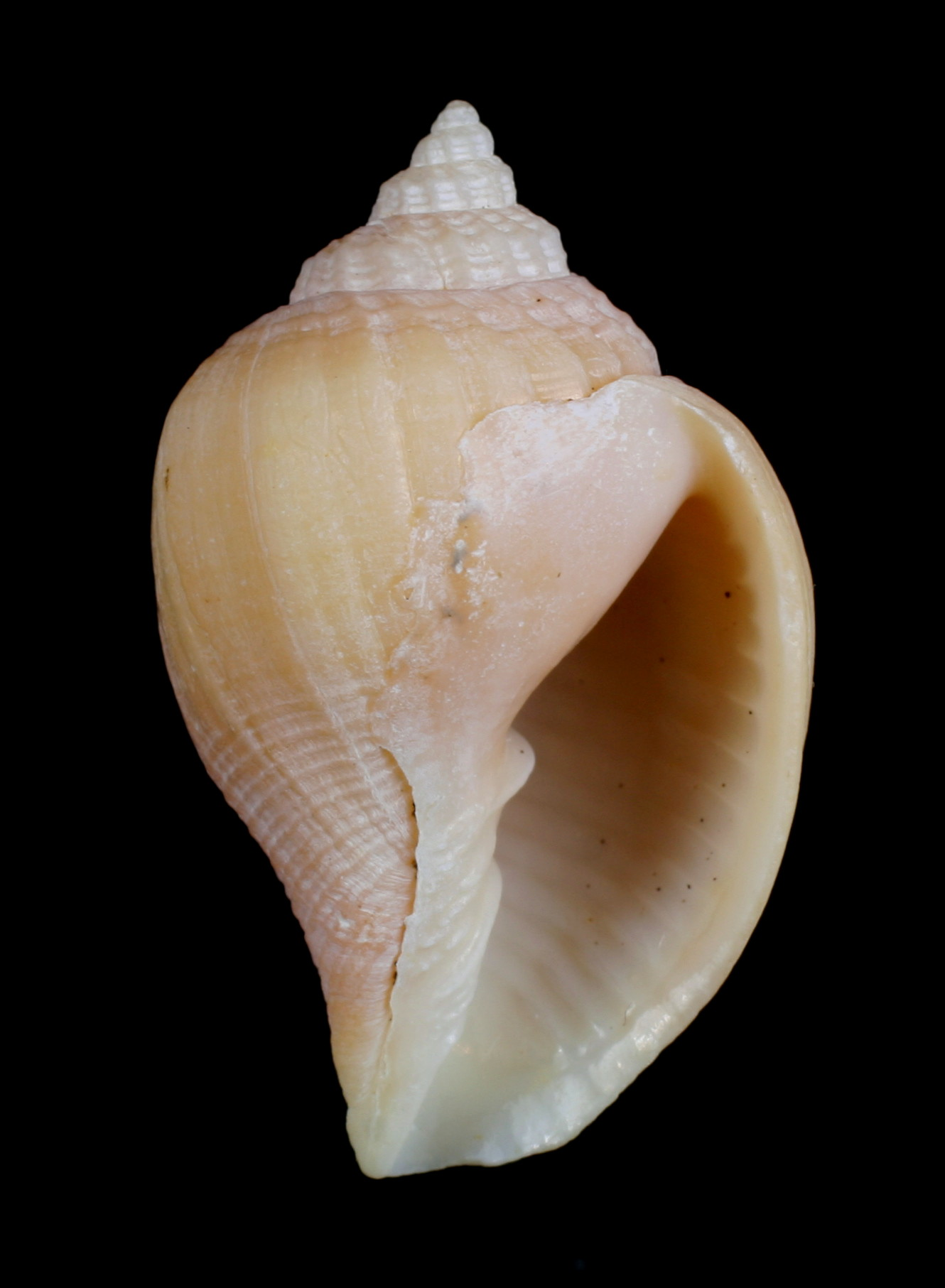
- Apertural view of shell of Pyruclia bulbulus (Sowerby, 1832)

Scientific classification
- Kingdom: Animalia
- Phylum: Mollusca
- Class: Gastropoda
- Subclass: Caenogastropoda
- Order: Neogastropoda
- Family: Cancellariidae
- Genus: Pyruclia
- Species: P. bulbulus

Binomial name
- Pyruclia bulbulus (Sowerby, 1832)

= Pyruclia bulbulus =

Species of gastropod

Pyruclia bulbulus is a species of sea snail, a marine gastropod mollusk in the family Cancellariidae, the nutmeg snails.
