= Leucosyrinx xenica =

Scientific classification
- Kingdom: Animalia
- Phylum: Mollusca
- Class: Gastropoda
- Subclass: Caenogastropoda
- Order: Neogastropoda
- Superfamily: Conoidea
- Family: Pseudomelatomidae
- Genus: Leucosyrinx
- Species: L. xenica

Binomial name
- Leucosyrinx xenica Woodring 1970

Extinct species of gastropod

Leucosyrinx xenica is an extinct species of sea snail, a marine gastropod mollusk in the family Pseudomelatomidae, the turrids and allies.

== Description ==
The length of the shell attains 15.4 mm, its diameter is 4.9 mm.

== Distribution ==
Fossils of this marine species were found in Miocene strata of the Upper Gatun Formation of Panama; age range: 11.608 to 7.246 Ma.
