= Conasprella burckhardti =

Scientific classification
- Domain: Eukaryota
- Kingdom: Animalia
- Phylum: Mollusca
- Class: Gastropoda
- Subclass: Caenogastropoda
- Order: Neogastropoda
- Superfamily: Conoidea
- Family: Conidae
- Genus: Conasprella
- Species: C. burckhardti

Binomial name
- Conasprella burckhardti (Böse, 1906)

Synonyms
- †Conasprella (Ximeniconus) burckhardti (Böse, 1906); † Conus burckhardti Böse, 1906; † Conus harrisi Olsson, 1922

Extinct species of gastropod

Conasprella burckhardti is an extinct species of sea snail, a marine gastropod mollusk in the family Conidae, the cone snails and their allies.

== Description ==
The length of the shell attains 31 mm.

== Distribution ==
Fossils of this marine species were found in Miocene and Pliocene strata in the following locations:the Gatun Formation, Panama, Colombia, Ecuador, Venezuela, Costa Rica and in Mexico; age rangez: 11.608 to 2.588 Ma.
