= Gatún Formation =

Geologic formation in Panama

- Stratigraphic range: Latest Serravallian-Tortonian (Clarendonian-Hemphillian); ~12–8.5 Ma
- Type: Formation
- Underlies: alluvium
- Overlies: Caimito Formation, unnamed Cretaceous volcanics

Lithology
- Primary: Sandstone, siltstone
- Other: Tuff, conglomerate

Location
- Coordinates: 9.3°N 79.8°W
- Approximate paleocoordinates: 8.9°N 78.1°W
- Region: Colón Province
- Country: Panama
- Extent: Panama Basin

Type section
- Named for: Lake Gatún
- Named by: Howe
- Year defined: 1907
- Gatún Formation (Panama)

The Gatún Formation (Tg) is a geologic formation in the Colón and Panamá Provinces of central Panama. The formation crops out in and around the Panama Canal Zone. The coastal to marginally marine sandstone, siltstone, claystone, tuff and conglomerate formation dates to the latest Serravallian to Tortonian (Clarendonian to Hemphillian in the NALMA classification), from 12 to 8.5 Ma. It preserves many fossils, among others, megalodon teeth have been found in the formation.

== Description ==
The Gatún Formation was first defined and named as such by Howe in 1907. The formation was known before and when William Phipps Blake traveled across Panama in 1853 on his way to California to join one of the transcontinental railroad surveying parties, he collected a few Gatún Formation fossils. In the Canal Zone the contact between the formation with the underlying Caimito Formation is covered by the waters of Lake Gatún and even before the flooding of the lake perhaps all of the contact was concealed by swamps.

Massive medium- to very fine-grained sandstones and siltstones are the chief constituents of the Gatún Formation. They are somewhat calcareous, or marly, somewhat tuffaceous, and have a clay-like matrix. The sandstone contains numerous grains of black and greenish volcanic rocks and is practically a subgraywacke. Conglomerates and hard brittle very fine-grained tuff make up a small part of the formation. Basalt intrudes older formations in the Lake Gatún area, but is not known to penetrate the Gatún Formation.

== Fossil content ==
- Agatrix agathe
- Aphera aphrodite
- Axelella cativa
- Bivetiella dilatata
- Cancellaria harzhauseri, C. mixta
- Otodus megalodon
- Carinodrillia zooki
- Chilomycterus exspectatus, C. tyleri
- Conasprella burckhardti, C. imitator
- Conus (Stephanoconus) woodringi
- Cryoturris habra
- Cynoscion latiostialis, C. scitulus
- Diaphus apalus, D. gatunensis
- Euclia alacertata
- Hindsiclava consors
- Lepophidium gentilis
- Leucosyrinx xenica
- Massyla toulai
- Pyruclia tweedledee, P. tweedledum
- Umbrina opima
- Ventrilia coatesi

== See also ==
- List of fossiliferous stratigraphic units in Panama
