= Elegestolepis =

Elegestolepis Temporal range: Late Silurian-Early Devonian, 427.4–416 Ma

Scientific classification
- Domain: Eukaryota
- Kingdom: Animalia
- Phylum: Chordata
- Infraphylum: Gnathostomata
- Clade: Eugnathostomata
- Class: Chondrichthyes
- Genus: †Elegestolepis; Karatajūtė-Talimaa, 1973
- Species: †E. grossi

Binomial name
- †Elegestolepis grossi Karatajūtė-Talimaa, 1973

Extinct genus of cartilaginous fishes

Elegestolepis is a primitive shark from the Mongolepidida that lived during the Silurian and Devonian periods in Russia with only one species, E. grossi, known to date. It was closely related to Mongolepis and Polymerolepis. It is only known from fragmentary placoid scales discovered in Russia before 1973. The oldest of these scales have been dated back to the Ludlow epoch (427.4 Ma to 423 Ma), making Elegestolepis the oldest known shark. Elegestolepis dates back to about 420 millions years ago, but some scales that may yet represent another shark ancestor are known from 450 million years ago.

== Description ==
Although the placoid scales of Elegestolepis are accepted to be those of a shark, subtle differences in the scales suggest that Elegestolepis itself may have been quite different in appearance to modern sharks. It is not known what Elegestolepis looked like due to the fragmentary nature of the known remains.
