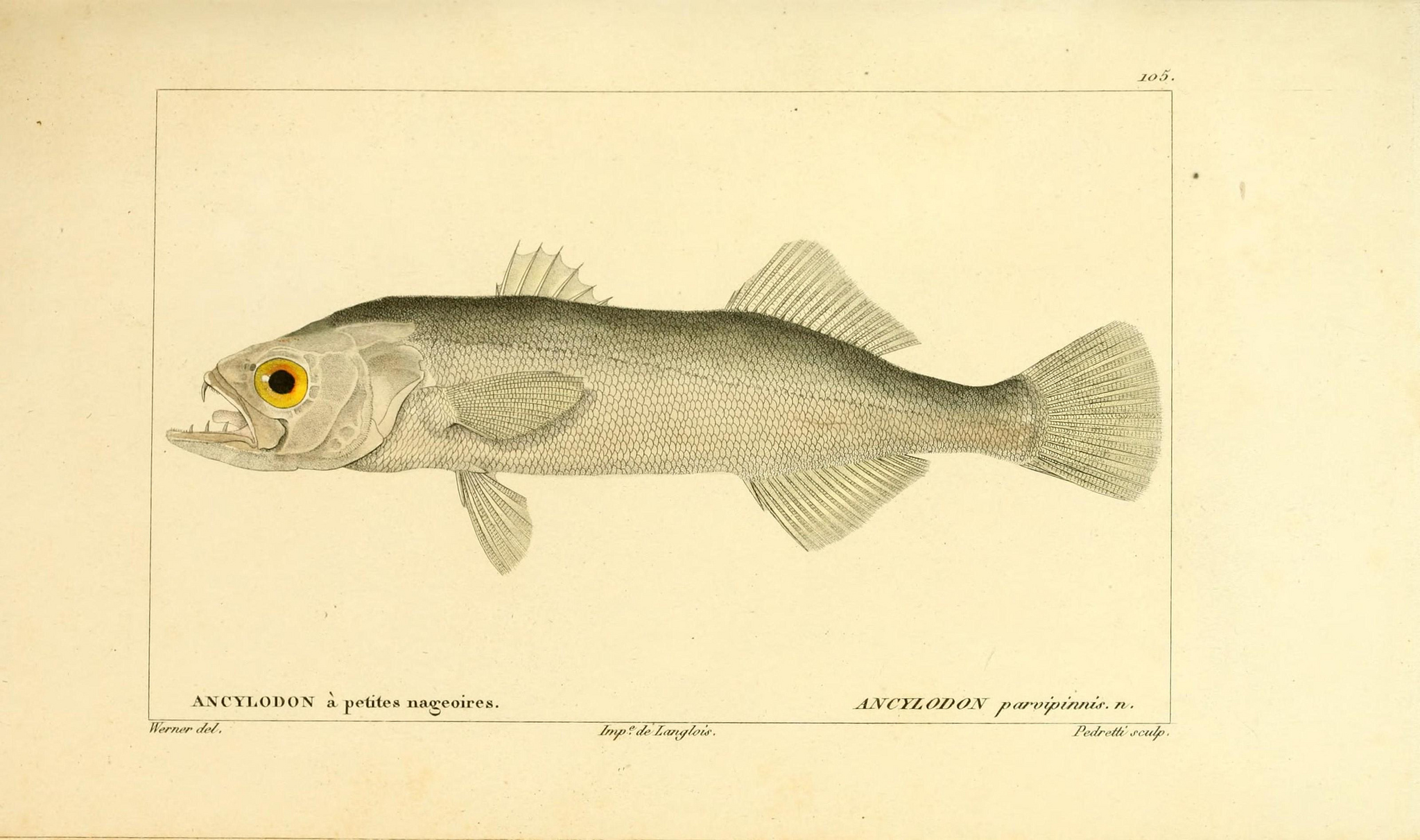
- Isopisthus parvipinnis

Scientific classification
- Kingdom: Animalia
- Phylum: Chordata
- Class: Actinopterygii
- Order: Acanthuriformes
- Family: Sciaenidae
- Genus: Isopisthus; Gill, 1862

Type species
- Ancylodon parvipinnis Cuvier 1830

= Isopisthus =

Genus of fishes

Isopisthus is a genus of marine ray-finned fishes belonging to the family Sciaenidae, the drums and croakers. These fishes are found in the western Atlantic and eastern Pacific Oceans.

== Taxonomy ==
Isopisthus was first proposed as a monospecific genus in 1862 by the American biologist Theodore Gill with Ancylodon parvipinnis, originally described by Georges Cuvier in 1830 with its type locality given as Cayenne, designated as its type species. This genus has been placed in the subfamily Cynoscioninae by some workers, but the 5th edition of Fishes of the World does not recognise subfamilies within the Sciaenidae which it places in the order Acanthuriformes.

== Etymology ==
Isopisthus is a combination of isos, meaning "equal", and opisthen, which means "behind", an allusion to the soft-rayed part of the dorsal fin and anal fin of the bigtooth corvina being almost equal in length.

== Species ==
Isopisthus has 2 extant species classified within it:

- Isopisthus parvipinnis (Cuvier, 1830) (Bigtooth corvina)
- Isopisthus remifer Jordan & Gilbert, 1882 (Silver weakfish)

An extinct species was described in 2016 from the Río Banano Formation of Costa Rica:

- †Isopisthus acer Aguilera, Schwarzans & Béarez, 2016

== Characteristics ==
Isopisthus species have an elongated and highly compressed body. They have large eyes and an oblique mouth which has the lower jaw clearly protruding. There are no barbels or pores on the chin. The upper jaw has a pair of robust, curved cacine-like teeth at its tip. The margin of the preoperculum has small serrations and the upper angle of the operculum is incised. The dorsal fin is divided in two separate parts, with a gap between each part. The anal fin is supported by 2 short spines and between 16 and 20 soft rays. The scales are cycloid and the soft-rayed part of the dorsal fin and the anal fin are scaled. The lateral line reaches the centre of the caudal fin. The bigtooth corvina has a maximum published total length of 41.6 cm (16.4 in), while that of the silver weakfish is 36 cm (14 in).

== Distribution and habitat ==
Isopisthus is found in the western Atlantic and eastern Pacific. The bigtooth corvina occurs in shallow inshore waters over sandy mud or soft mud substrates from Costa Rica to southern Brazil. The silver weakfish is found in inshore waters and outer estuarine areas from Baja California and the Gulf of California to Peru.

== Fisheries and conservation ==
Isopithus fishes are caught by fisheries. The silver weakfish is targeted by commercial and artesinal fisheries and has shown declines in the amount landed and the size of the fishes landed but it is still a common species with a wide range and is classified as Least Concern by the IUCN. The bigtooth corvina is not targeted by fisheries but is caught as bycatch in shrimp trawl fisheries, although it is not of great commercial value and the catch is mainly used as bait. This species is also classified as Least Concern.
