= Cepola rostislavi =

Cepola rostislavi Temporal range: Lutetian

Scientific classification
- Kingdom: Animalia
- Phylum: Chordata
- Class: Actinopterygii
- Division: Teleostei
- Order: Acanthuriformes
- Family: Cepolidae
- Genus: Cepola
- Species: †C. rostislavi

Binomial name
- †Cepola rostislavi Lin et al., 2017

Extinct species of fish

Cepola rostislavi is an extinct species of Cepola that lived during the Lutetian stage of the Eocene epoch.

== Distribution ==
Fossils of C. rostislavi are known from the Aquitaine Basin of France.
