= Brasso Formation =

Geologic formation in Trinidad and Tobago

- Stratigraphic range: Early Eocene-Serravallian
- Type: Formation
- Sub-units: Machapoorie Limestone

Lithology
- Primary: Claystone, sandstone
- Other: Limestone

Location
- Coordinates: 10.6°N 61.1°W
- Approximate paleocoordinates: 8.1°N 51.4°W
- Country: Trinidad and Tobago
- Brasso Formation (Trinidad and Tobago)

The Brasso Formation is a geologic formation in Trinidad and Tobago. It preserves fossils dating back to the Early Eocene to Serravallian period.

== Fossil content ==
Among others, the formation has provided fossils of:

- Dentimides
- Lepidophanes brassoensis
- Myctophum mundulum
- Neobythites huddlestoni
- Ophioscion transitivus
- Xenotolithus semiostialis

== See also ==
- List of fossiliferous stratigraphic units in Trinidad and Tobago
