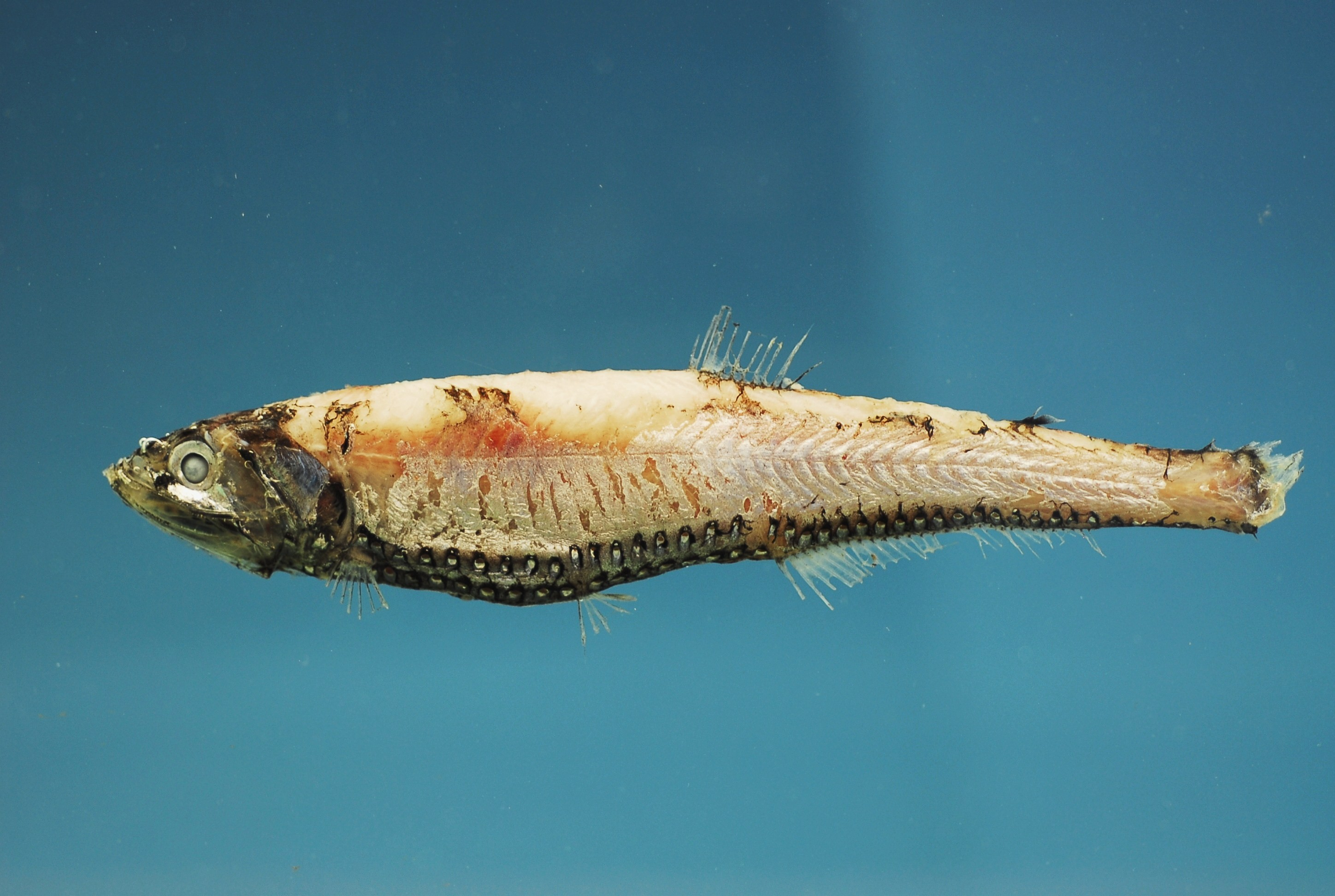
- Large-scaled lanternfish (N. macrolepidotus)
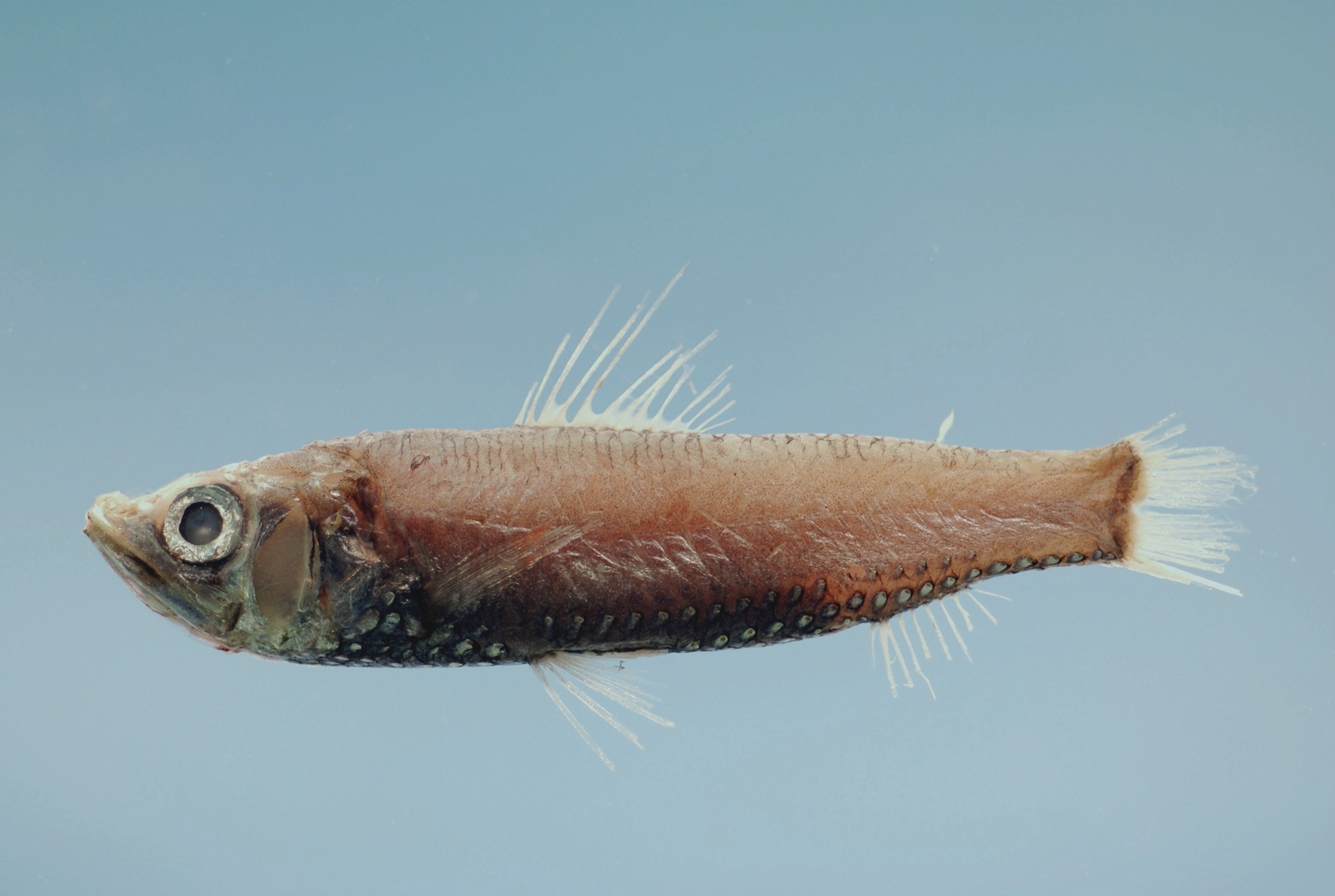
- Shortfin neoscopelid (N. microchir)

Scientific classification
- Domain: Eukaryota
- Kingdom: Animalia
- Phylum: Chordata
- Class: Actinopterygii
- Order: Myctophiformes
- Family: Neoscopelidae
- Genus: Neoscopelus; J. Y. Johnson, 1863

= Neoscopelus =

Genus of fishes

Neoscopelus is a genus of blackchins.

== Species ==
The currently recognized species in this genus are:

- Neoscopelus macrolepidotus J. Y. Johnson, 1863 (large-scaled lanternfish)
- Neoscopelus microchir Matsubara, 1943 (shortfin neoscopelid)
- Neoscopelus porosus R. Arai, 1969 (spangleside neoscopelid)
