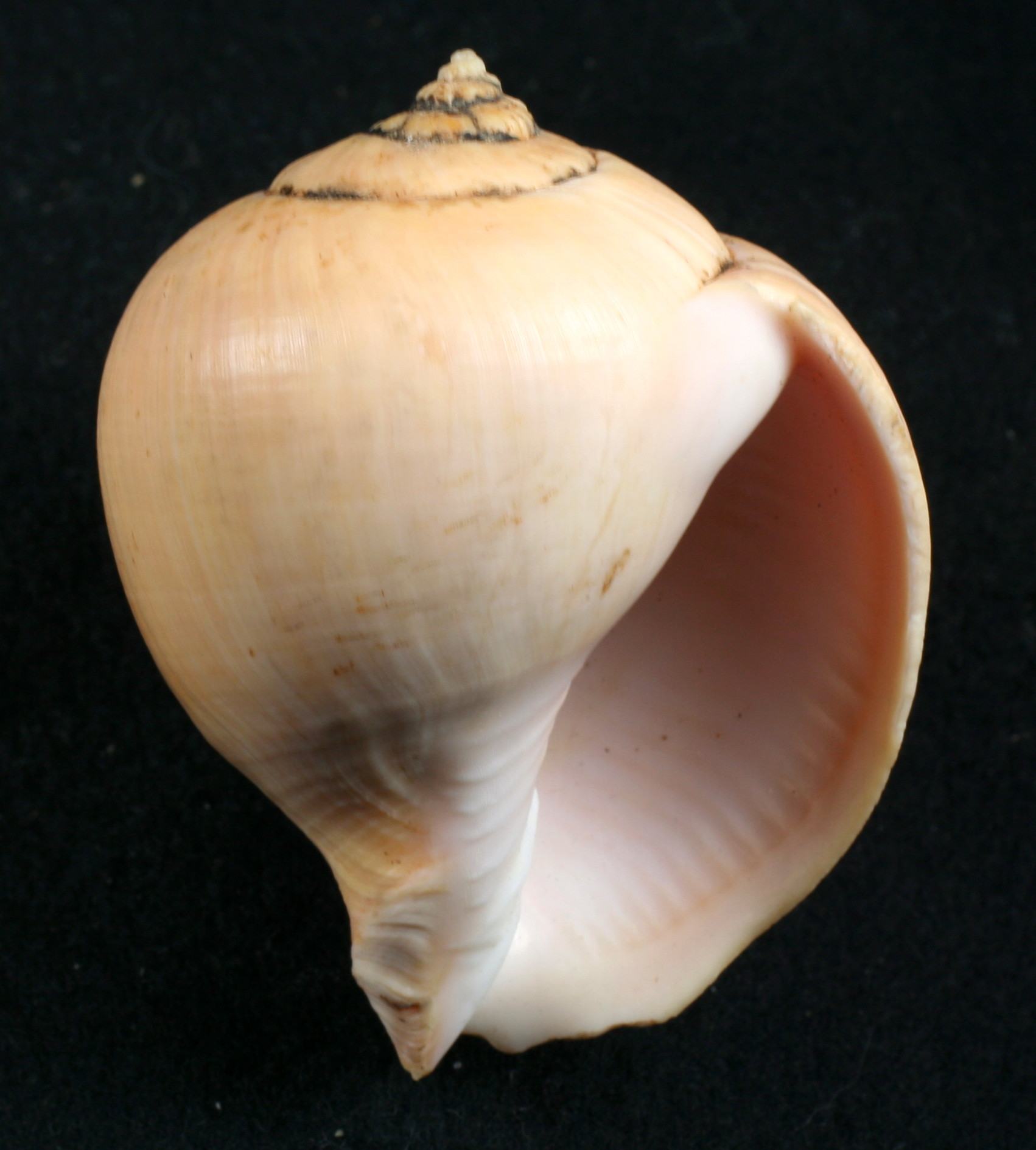
- Apertural view of shell of Pyruclia solida (Sowerby, 1832)

Scientific classification
- Kingdom: Animalia
- Phylum: Mollusca
- Class: Gastropoda
- Subclass: Caenogastropoda
- Order: Neogastropoda
- Family: Cancellariidae
- Genus: Pyruclia; Olsson, 1932

= Pyruclia =

Genus of gastropods

Pyruclia is a genus of sea snails, marine gastropod mollusks in the family Cancellariidae, the nutmeg snails.

== Species ==
Species within the genus Pyruclia include:

- Pyruclia bulbulus Sowerby, 1832
- Pyruclia pyrum A. Adams & Reeve, 1850
- Pyruclia solida G.B. Sowerby I, 1832
