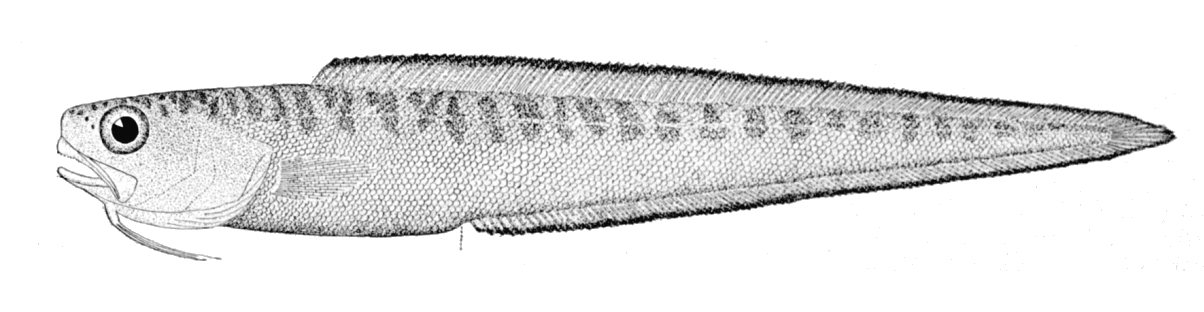
- L. marmoratum
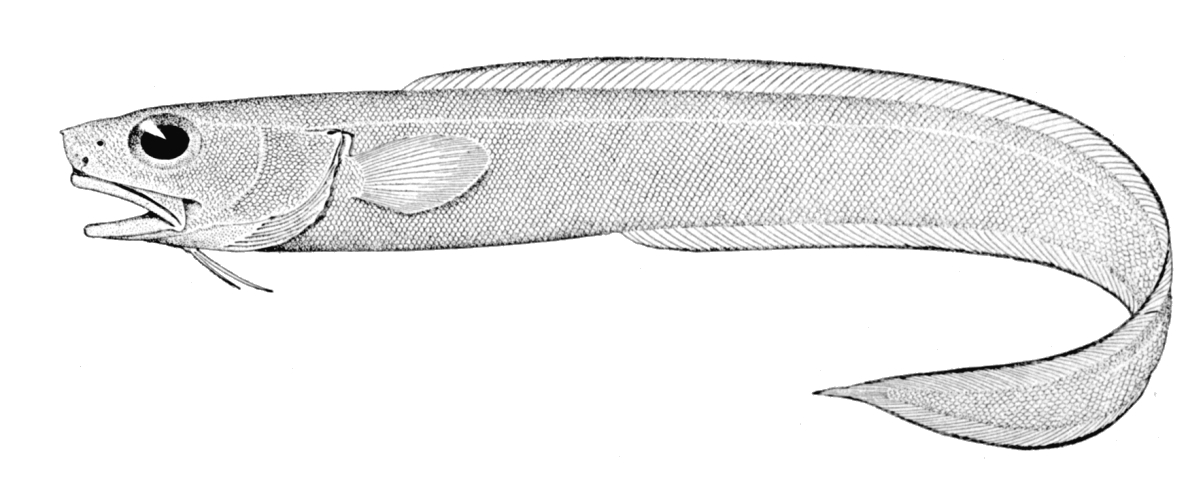
- Blackrim Cusk-eel (L. profundorum)

Scientific classification
- Kingdom: Animalia
- Phylum: Chordata
- Class: Actinopterygii
- Order: Ophidiiformes
- Family: Ophidiidae
- Subfamily: Ophidiinae
- Genus: Lepophidium; Gill, 1895

Type species
- Leptophidium profundorum Gill, 1863

= Lepophidium =

Genus of fishes

Lepophidium is a genus of cusk-eels.

== Species ==
There are currently 21 recognized species in this genus:

- Lepophidium aporrhox C. R. Robins, 1961 (Dusky cusk-eel)
- Lepophidium brevibarbe (G. Cuvier, 1829) (Shortbeard cusk-eel)
- Lepophidium collettei C. R. Robins, R. H. Robins & M. E. Brown, 2012
- Lepophidium crossotum C. R. Robins, R. H. Robins & M. E. Brown, 2012
- Lepophidium cultratum C. R. Robins, R. H. Robins & M. E. Brown, 2012
- Lepophidium entomelan C. R. Robins, R. H. Robins & M. E. Brown, 2012
- Lepophidium gilmorei C. R. Robins, R. H. Robins & M. E. Brown, 2012
- Lepophidium hubbsi Robins & Lea, 1978
- Lepophidium inca Robins & Lea, 1978
- Lepophidium jeannae Fowler, 1941 (Mottled cusk-eel)
- Lepophidium kallion C. R. Robins, 1959
- Lepophidium marmoratum (Goode & T. H. Bean, 1885)
- Lepophidium microlepis (C. H. Gilbert, 1890) (Silver cusk-eel)
- Lepophidium negropinna Hildebrand & F. O. Barton, 1949 (Specklefin cusk-eel)
- Lepophidium pardale (C. H. Gilbert, 1890) (Leopard cusk-eel)
- Lepophidium pheromystax C. R. Robins, 1960 (Blackedge cusk-eel)
- Lepophidium profundorum (T. N. Gill, 1863) (Blackrim cusk-eel)
- Lepophidium prorates (D. S. Jordan & Bollman, 1890) (Prowspine cusk-eel)
- Lepophidium robustum C. R. Robins, R. H. Robins & M. E. Brown, 2012
- Lepophidium staurophor C. R. Robins, 1959 (Barred cusk-eel)
- Lepophidium stigmatistium (C. H. Gilbert, 1890) (Blotchfin cusk-eel)
- Lepophidium wileyi C. R. Robins, R. H. Robins & M. E. Brown, 2012
- Lepophidium zophochir C. R. Robins, R. H. Robins & M. E. Brown, 2012
