= Coelorinchus nordenskjoeldi =

Coelorinchus nordenskjoeldi Temporal range: Ypresian

Scientific classification
- Kingdom: Animalia
- Phylum: Chordata
- Class: Actinopterygii
- Division: Teleostei
- Order: Gadiformes
- Family: Macrouridae
- Genus: Coelorinchus
- Species: †C. nordenskjoeldi

Binomial name
- †Coelorinchus nordenskjoeldi Schwarzhans et al., 2017

Species of fish

Coelorinchus nordenskjoeldi is an extinct species of Coelorinchus that lived during the Ypresian stage of the Palaeogene period.

== Distribution ==
Otolith fossils of C. nordenskjoeldi are known from the La Meseta Formation of Antarctica.
