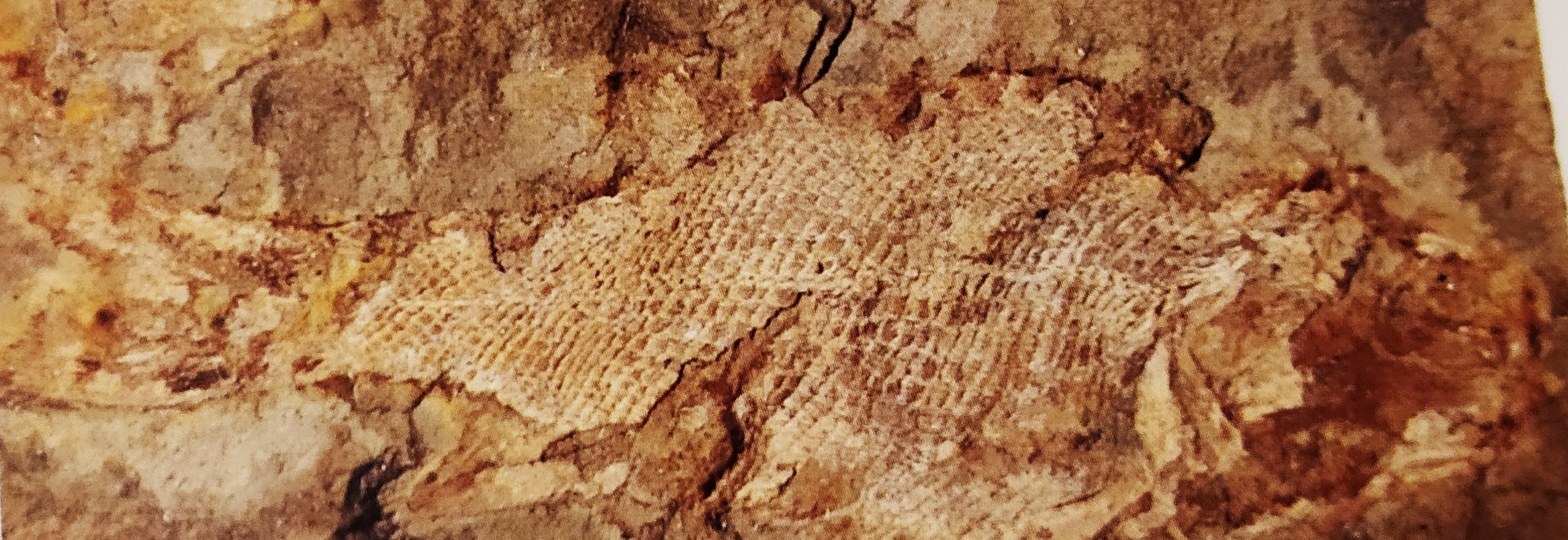
- Aetheretmon valentiacum fossil

Scientific classification
- Kingdom: Animalia
- Phylum: Chordata
- Class: Actinopterygii
- Family: †Strepheoschemidae
- Genus: †Aetheretmon; White, 1927
- Species: †A. valentiacum

Binomial name
- †Aetheretmon valentiacum White, 1927

Synonyms
- Aetherthmon White, 1927

= Aetheretmon =

Aetheretmon Temporal range: Tournaisian to Viséan

Extinct genus of ray-finned fishes

Aetheretmon is an extinct genus of freshwater and estuarine ray-finned fish that lived during the early Mississippian (Dinantian) age in what is now Europe, including Scotland, Belarus, and Russia. It contains only the species A. valentiacum. This genus has the oldest known actinopterygian growth series, indicating that juvenile Aetheretmon had tails similar to those of modern teleosts, but unlike teleosts, their upper tails continued to grow throughout their lives instead of truncating early. Initially classified as a "palaeoniscid", later studies have recovered it as a stem-neopterygian, or more recently a stem-actinopteran.
