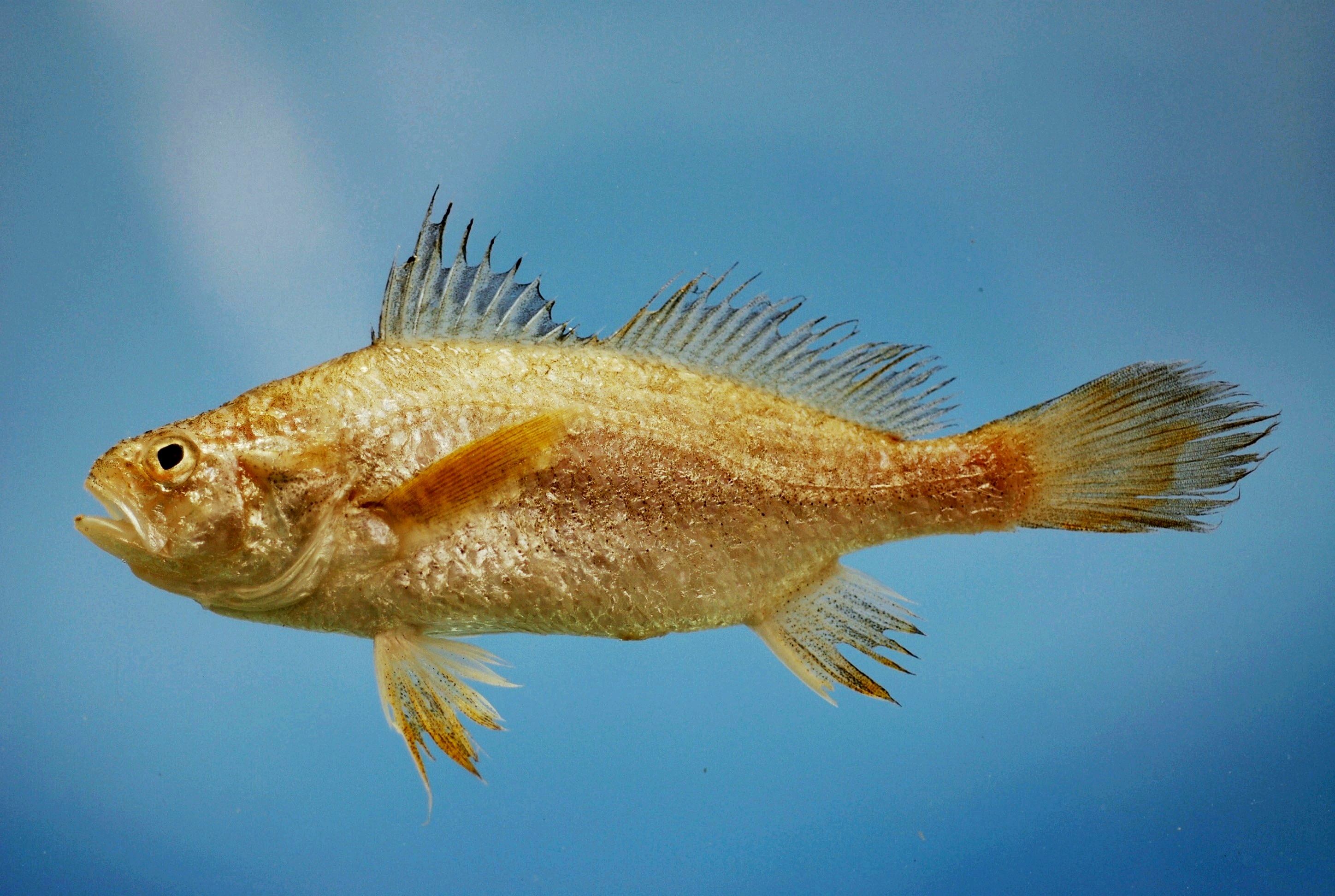
- Stellifer lanceolatus

Scientific classification
- Kingdom: Animalia
- Phylum: Chordata
- Class: Actinopterygii
- Order: Acanthuriformes
- Family: Sciaenidae
- Genus: Stellifer; Oken, 1817

Type species
- Bodianus stellifer Bloch, 1790

Species
- see text

Synonyms
- Homoprion Holbrook, 1855; Ophioscion Gill, 1863; Sigmurus Gilbert, 1898; Stellicarens Gilbert, 1898; Stelliferus Stark, 1828; Zestidium Gilbert, 1898; Zestis Gilbert, 1898

= Stellifer =

Genus of fishes

Stellifer is a genus of fish in the family Sciaenidae, the drums and croakers. It is found in New World waters. Many species are known commonly as stardrums.

In the Americas, this is one of the most diverse genera among the sciaenids. Its members can be found in the tropics and subtropics and in shallow and deeper waters. Some are semianadromous, spawning in the ocean near estuaries so the eggs and young will be taken into lower-salinity environments on the tides.

The genus belongs to the subfamily Stelliferinae, whose members have double-chambered swim bladders (the smaller front chamber is "yoke-shaped" and the main chamber is "carrot-shaped") and two pairs of large otoliths.

These fish are very common in their range, and there are usually at least two species occurring together. Stellifer rastrifer is one of the most abundant sciaenids in the seas along the coast of Brazil.

These fish are carnivorous, with diet assessments of a few different species finding mysids such as Mysidopsis coelhoi, copepods such as Acartia lilljeborgii and Pseudodiaptomus acutus, sergestoid prawns such as Peisos petrunkevitchi, amphipods, chaetognaths, isopods, cumaceans, ostracods, ascidian tunicates, nematodes, polychaetes, fish, and bivalves, or at least their siphons. S. rastrifer is known to cannibalize juveniles of its own species.

Several species are common bycatch in the seabob shrimp industry.

== Taxonomy ==
Stellifer was first proposed as a monospecific genus in 1817 by Lorenz Oken, based on Les Stelliferes of Georges Cuvier of 1816. The only species then in the genus was Bodianus stellifer which had been described in 1789 by Marcus Elieser Bloch with its type locality being given as the Cape of Good Hope in South Africa, although this is likely to be Suriname. FishBase treats this genus and Ophioscion as separate valid genera, while Catalog of Fishes treats Ophioscion as a synonym of Stellifer. Some workers have placed this genus in the subfamily Stelliferinae. However, the 5th edition of Fishes of the World does not recognise tribes or subfamilies within the Sciaenidae which it places in the order Acanthuriformes.

== Species ==
Stellifer contains the following recognized valid species:

- Stellifer brasiliensis (Schultz, 1945)
- Stellifer cervigoni Chao, Carvalho-Filho & Andrade Santos, 2021 (Black gill stardrum)
- Stellifer chaoi Aguilera, Solano & Valdez, 1983
- Stellifer chrysoleuca (Günther, 1867) (Shortnose stardrum)
- Stellifer collettei Chao, Carvalho-Filho & Andrade Santos, 2021 (Bigmouth stardrum)
- Stellifer colonensis Meek & Hildebrand, 1925 (Stardrum)
- Stellifer ephelis Chirichigno, 1974
- Stellifer ericymba (Jordan & Gilbert, 1882) (Hollow stardrum)
- Stellifer fuerthii (Steindachner, 1875) (White stardrum)
- Stellifer gomezi (Cervigón, 2011)
- Stellifer griseus Cervigón, 1966 (Gray stardrum)
- Stellifer illecebrosus Gilbert, 1898 (Silver stardrum)
- Stellifer lanceolatus (Holbrook, 1855) (American stardrum)
- Stellifer macallisteri Chao, Carvalho-Filho & Andrade Santos, 2021 (Caribbean stardrum)
- Stellifer magoi Aguilera, 1983
- Stellifer mancorensis Chirichigno, 1962 (Smooth stardrum)
- Stellifer melanocheir C. H. Eigenmann, 1918 (Black stardrum)
- Stellifer menezesi Chao, Carvalho-Filho & Andrade Santos, 2021 (Brazilian stardrum)
- Stellifer microps (Steindachner, 1864) (Smalleye stardrum)
- Stellifer minor (Tschudi, 1846) (Minor stardrum)
- Stellifer musicki Chao, Carvalho-Filho & Andrade Santos, 2021 (Bigeye stardrum)
- Stellifer naso (Jordan, 1889)
- Stellifer oscitans (Jordan & Gilbert, 1882) (Yawning stardrum)
- Stellifer pizarroensis Hildebrand, 1946 (Pizzaro stardrum)
- Stellifer rastrifer (Jordan, 1889) (Rake stardrum)
- Stellifer stellifer (Bloch, 1790) (Little croaker)
- Stellifer venezuelae (Schultz, 1945)
- Stellifer walkeri Chao, 2001 (Professor stardrum)
- Stellifer wintersteenorum Chao, 2001 (Amigo stardrum)
- Stellifer zestocarus Gilbert, 1898 (Softhead stardrum)
