= Springvale Formation =

Geologic formation in Trinidad and Tobago

- Stratigraphic range: Late Miocene
- Type: Formation
- Sub-units: Melajo Clay & Savaneta Members

Lithology
- Primary: Claystone, sandstone
- Other: Limestone

Location
- Coordinates: 10.6°N 61.1°W
- Approximate paleocoordinates: 10.5°N 59.6°W
- Country: Trinidad and Tobago
- Springvale Formation (Trinidad and Tobago)

The Springvale Formation is a geologic formation in Trinidad and Tobago. It preserves fossils dating back to the Late Miocene period.

== Fossil content ==
Among others, the formation has provided fossils of:

- Hindsiclava consors
- Plagioscion ultimus

== See also ==
- List of fossiliferous stratigraphic units in Trinidad and Tobago
