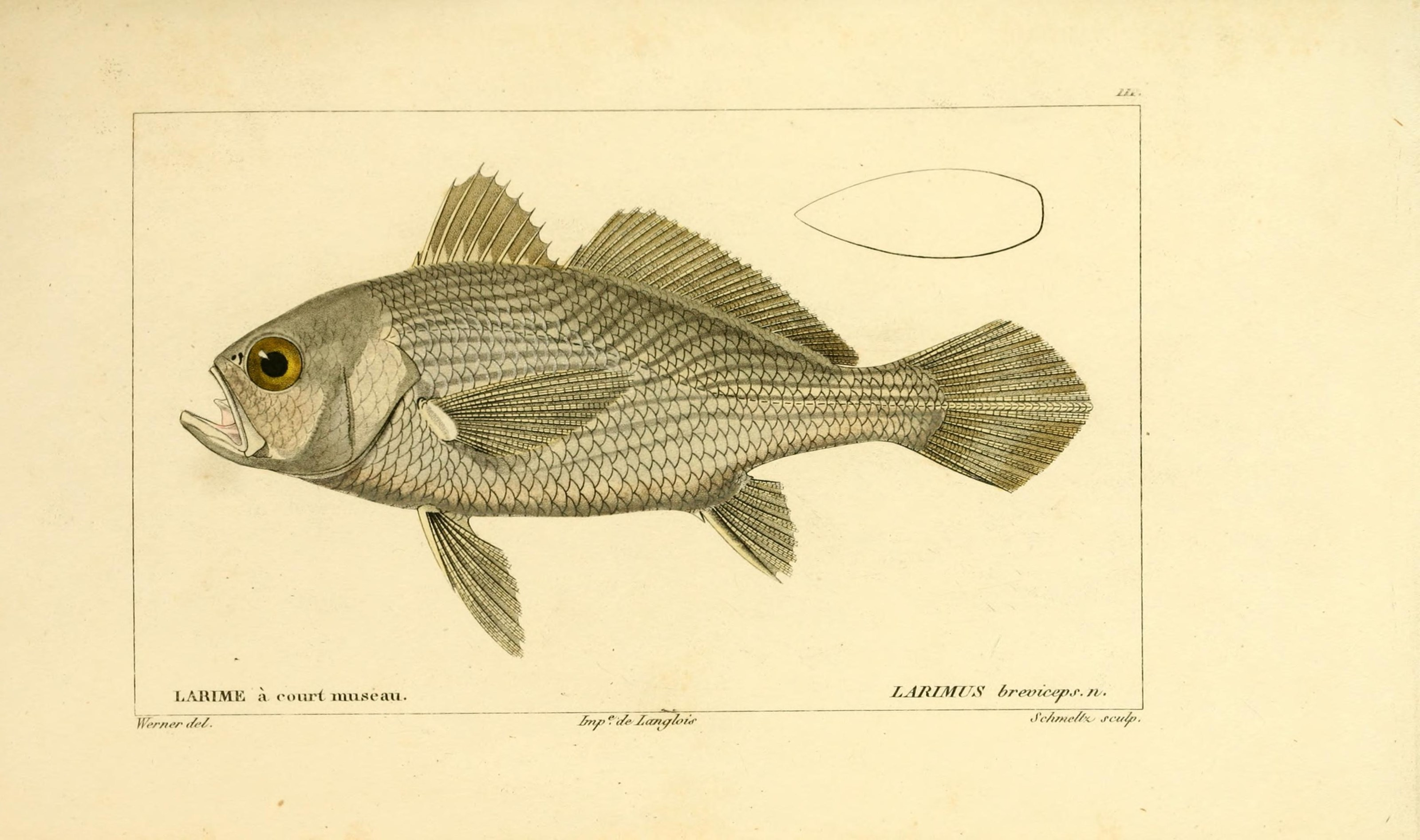
- Larimus breviceps

Scientific classification
- Kingdom: Animalia
- Phylum: Chordata
- Class: Actinopterygii
- Order: Acanthuriformes
- Family: Sciaenidae
- Genus: Larimus; Cuvier, 1830

Type species
- Larimus breviceps Cuvier, 1830

Synonyms
- Amblyscion Gill, 1863; Monosira Poey, 1881

= Larimus =

Genus of fishes

Larimus is a genus of marine ray-finned fishes belonging to the family Sciaenidae, the croakers and drums. These fishes are found in the Western Atlantic and Eastern Pacific Oceans.

== Taxonomy ==
Larimus was first proposed as monospecific genus in 1830 by the French zoologist Georges Cuvier when he described Larimus breviceps from Brazil and the Dominican Republic. This genus, along with Nebris, has been placed in the subfamily Lariminae by some workers, but the 5th edition of Fishes of the World does not recognise subfamilies within the Sciaenidae which it places in the order Acanthuriformes.

== Etymology ==
Larimus is a name that Oppian used for some kinds of fish without any precision and which Cuvier applied to L. breviceps.

== Species ==
Larimus has six extant valid species classified within it:

- Larimus acclivis Jordan & Bristol, 1898 (Steeplined drum)
- Larimus argenteus (Gill, 1863) (Silver drum)
- Larimus breviceps Cuvier, 1830 (Shorthead drum)
- Larimus effulgens Gilbert, 1898 (Shining drum)
- Larimus fasciatus Holbrook, 1855 (Banded drum)
- Larimus pacificus Jordan & Bollman, 1890 (Pacific drum)

A seventh species, Larimus gulosus is considered to be a valid species by some authorities, but as a synonym of L. pacificus by others.

There are also at least three extinct species classified within the genus:

- †Larimus angosturae Aguilera, Shwarzhans & Béarez, 2016
- †Larimus humboldti Aguilera, Shwarzhans & Béarez, 2016
- †Larimus pandus Aguilera, Shwarzhans & Béarez, 2016

== Characteristics ==
Larimus drums have short, oblong, compressed bodies with a hump on the back. The large mouth is highly oblique and the lower jaw protrudes. There is no barbel on the chin but there are between 2 and 4 pores. They have 2 rows of small, sharp teeth. The margin of the preoperculum may be smooth or have small serrations and does not have robust spines. There is a deep incision at the angle of the operculum. The dorsal fin is deeply incised and the caudal fin is pointed. The anal fin has 2 spines, the second spine being two thirds of the length of the first, and 6 or 7 spines. They have ctenoid scales on. The body and cycloid scales on the head and fins. The largest species is the silver drum (L. argenteus) with a maximum published total length of 36.1 cm (14.2 in).

== Distribution ==
Larimus drums are found off the Americas with two species, the shorthead drum (L. breviceps) and the banded drum (L. fasciatus) in the Western Atlantic, and the remaining species in the eastern Pacific.
