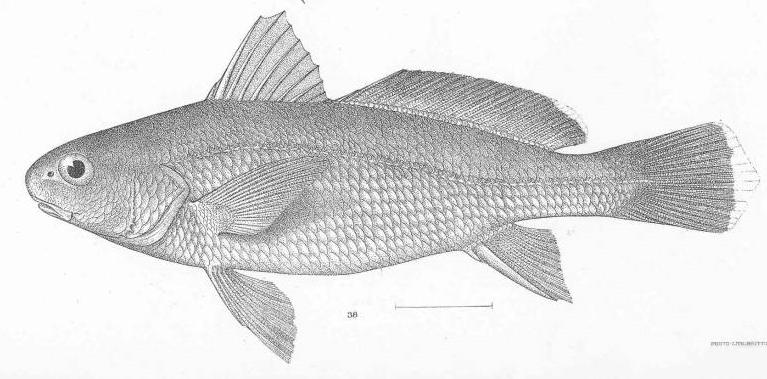
- Ophioscion similus

Scientific classification
- Kingdom: Animalia
- Phylum: Chordata
- Class: Actinopterygii
- Order: Acanthuriformes
- Family: Sciaenidae
- Genus: Ophioscion; Gill, 1863

Type species
- Ophioscion typicus Gill, 1863

Synonyms
- Sigmurus Gilbert, 1898

= Ophioscion =

Genus of ray-finned fishes

Ophioscion is a genus of marine ray-finned fishes belonging to the family Sciaenidae, the drums and croakers. These fishes are found in the Western Atlantic and Eastern Pacific Oceans.

== Taxonomy ==
Ophioscion was first proposed as a monospecific genus in 1863 by the American biologist Theodore Gill when he described Ophioscion typicus from the Pacific coast of Panama. Although FishBase recognises Ophioscion as a valid genus, Catalog of Fishes treats it as a synonym of Stellifer.

== Species ==
Ophioscion has the following valid species:

- Ophioscion adustus (Agassiz, 1831) (Croaker)
- Ophioscion costaricensis Caldwell, 1958
- Ophioscion imiceps (Jordan & Gilbert, 1882) (Blinkard croaker)
- Ophioscion panamensis Schultz, 1945
- Ophioscion punctatissimus Meek & Hildebrand, 1925 (Spotted croaker)
- Ophioscion scierus (Jordan & Gilbert, 1884) (Point-Tuza croaker)
- Ophioscion simulus Gilbert, 1898 (Snub-nosed croaker)
- Ophioscion strabo Gilbert, 1897 (Squint-eyed croaker)
- Ophioscion typicus Gill, 1863 (Point-nosed croaker)
- Ophioscion vermicularis (Günther, 1867) (Vermiculated croaker)
