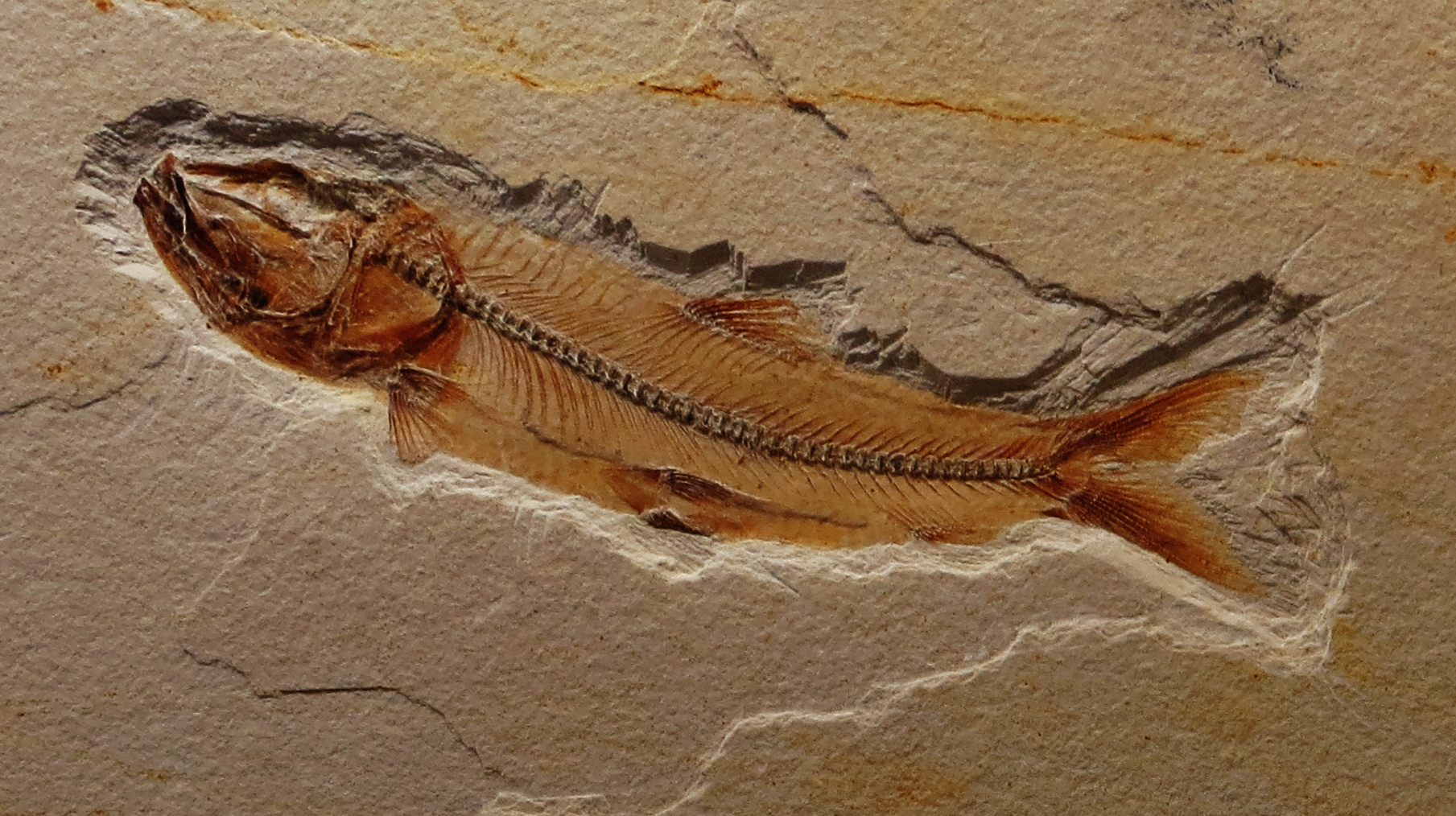
- Fossil of Orthogonikleithrus hoelli on display at the Jura Museum, Eichstätt, Germany.

Scientific classification
- Kingdom: Animalia
- Phylum: Chordata
- Class: Actinopterygii
- Family: †Orthogonikleithridae
- Genus: †Orthogonikleithrus; Arratia, 1987

Type species
- †Orthogonikleithrus leichi Arratia, 1987

Other species
- †Orthogonikleithrus francogalliensis Konwert, 2016; †Orthogonikleithrus hoelli Arratia, 1997

= Orthogonikleithrus =

Orthogonikleithrus Temporal range: Late Jurassic, 150.8–145.5 Ma

Extinct genus of ray-finned fishes

Orthogonikleithrus is a genus of extinct ray-finned fish that lived during the Late Jurassic period. It lived in lagoonal and restricted shallow subtidal zones.

== Discovery and naming ==
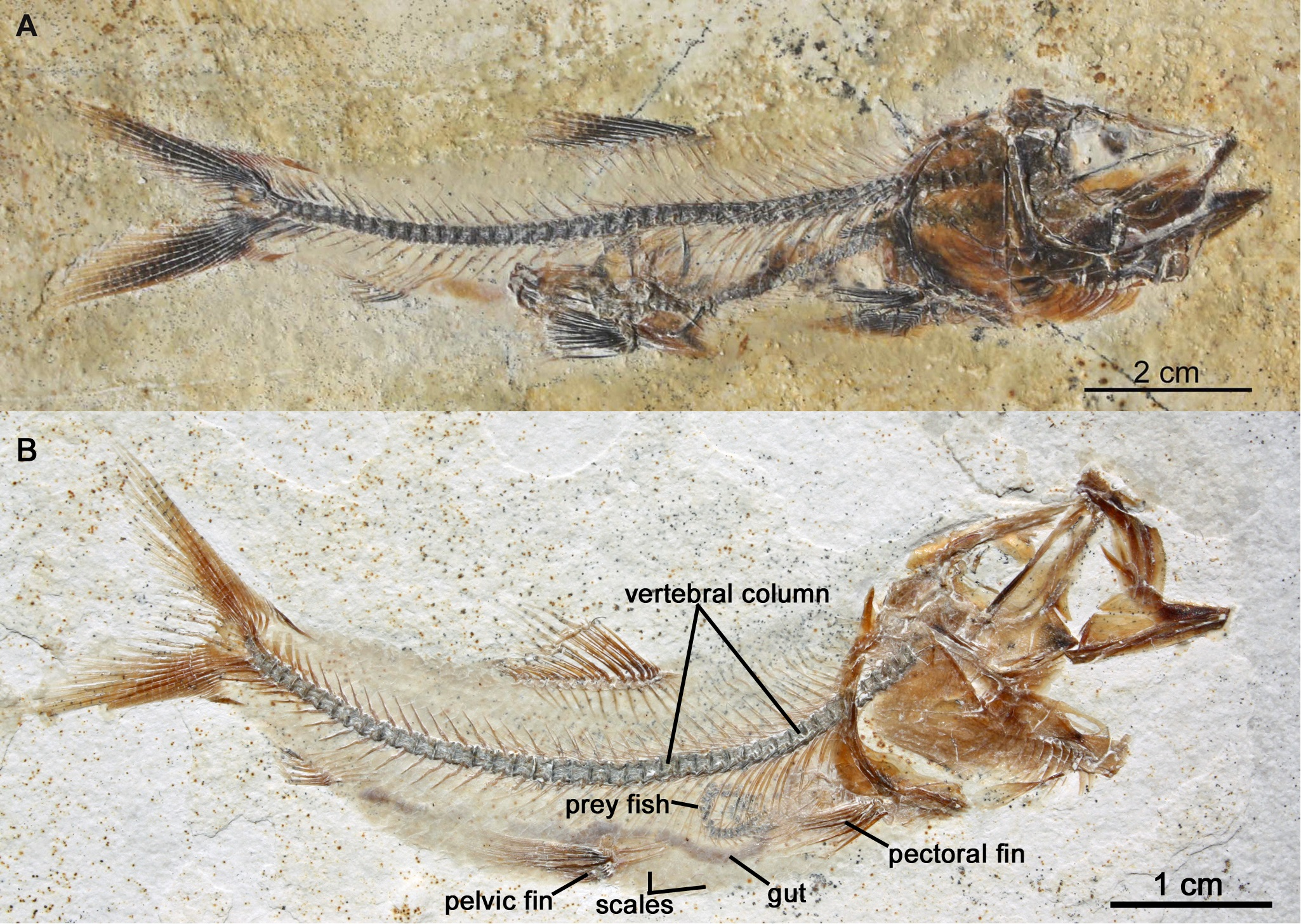
Predation on Orthogonikleithrus hoelli (seen in stomach) by another Orthogonikleithrus species

The type specimen Orthogonikleithrus leichi was described by G. Arratia in 1987, placing it into the Orthogonikleithridae family.

Another species, Orthogonikleithrus francogalliensis was described and assigned to this genus in 2016. It was discovered in Cerin (Ain, France). These specimens were collected during excavations in Cerin by the Université Claude Bernard, Lyon. The fish were not immediately identified as new taxa, and were only assigned during a study on the temporal and spatial distribution of orthogonikleithrid fishes. The new species is superficially similar to Orthogonikleithrus hoelli but differs in several anatomical features, such as the presence of teeth, the number of tubules in the cephalic lateral line system, and the number of hypurals and uroneurals. Due to the record of the genus Orthogonikleithrus in Cerin, the known spatial distribution of this genus was extended, as it formerly was only known from remains in Zandt and Ettling, both in Bavaria, Germany.
