= Columbus Basin =

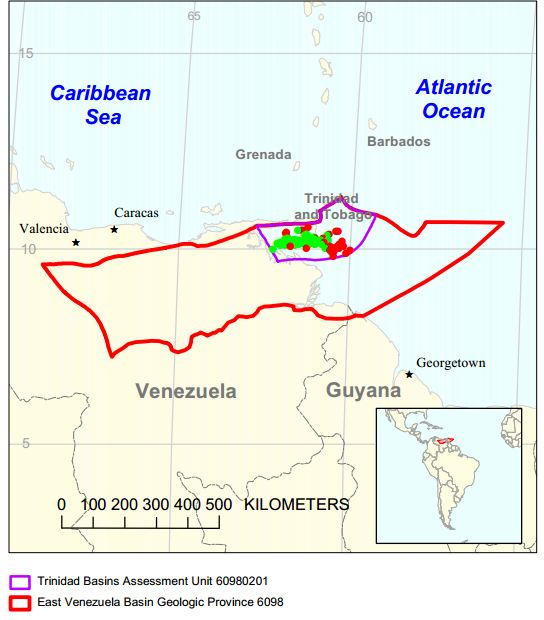
Map showing the location of Trinidad and its main hydrocarbon assets with respect to the location of the East Venezuela Basin

The Columbus Basin is a foreland basin located off the south eastern coast of Trinidad within the East Venezuela Basin (EVB). Due to the intensive deformation occurring along the Caribbean and South American plates in this region, the basin has a unique structural and stratigraphic relationship. The Columbus Basin has been a prime area for hydrocarbon exploration and production as its structures, sediments and burial history provide ideal conditions for generation and storage of hydrocarbon reserves. The Columbus Basin serves as a depocenter for the Orinoco River delta, where it is infilled with 15 km of fluvio-deltaic sediment. The area has also been extensively deformed by series of north west to southeast normal faults and northeast to southwest trending anticline structures.

== Location ==
The Columbus Basin makes up the eastern section of the EVB, occurring along the South American and Caribbean obliquely convergent plate margins. The East Venezuelan basin extends for approximately 1100 km wide where the Columbus Basin is most recent accounting for about 14,000 km² and is 15 Ma to 0 years in age. It is bounded by the Darien Ridge in the north (a continuation of the Central Range found on south western Trinidad) and the Delta Amacuro Platform to the south.

== Tectonic history ==
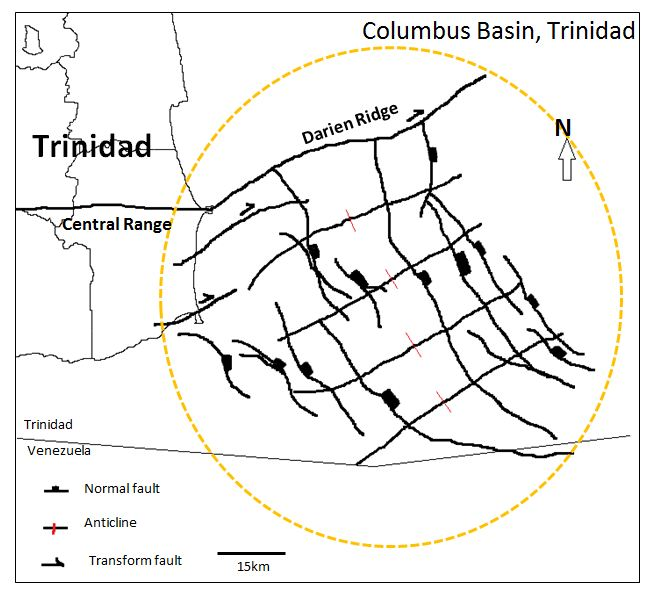
Basic structural Map for the Columbus Basin, Trinidad

The Columbus basin is Neogene in age and was formed by the oblique collision, from west to east, of the Caribbean plate and the South American plate. An easterly spreading centre in the Caribbean during the late Cretaceous led to the subduction of the Caribbean plate below the northern part of the South American plate. There was a transition during the Tertiary, from subduction to intense collision and deformation along the Caribbean and South American plates. The most intense deformation began in the early Miocene to Pleistocene. According to Garciacaro et al., the foreland basin was created by flexural subsidence at the passive margin of the colliding regions of the Caribbean and South American plates. The collision created loading of thrusts and folds which led to subsidence in the basin and contributed to the complex faulted and thrusted nature of the foreland basin formed. The Orinoco River delta has been the major source of siliciclastic sediments for the basin, with deposition within the basin beginning in the early Miocene. The Columbus basin is bounded by the Darien Ridge, part of the uplift region in the north west, which separates the thrusted area from the extended section to the southeast.

== Structure ==
The two major structural features of the Columbus basin are a series of NW-SE, dipping to N-E, oriented faults and a series of NE-SW trending thrusts or anticlines. During the Pleistocene, the Columbus basin was divided into two sub-basins by the Columbus Channel Syncline. The dip in the northern sub-basin is to the south, while in the southern sub-basin is to the north. The faults are Pliocene to late Pleistocene in age and were developed as a result of sediment loading from the southwest. The get progressively younger from west to east and have throws as much as 3050m in some areas. The anticlines formed in association with the fault system as the normal faults cause extension, the sediments form rollover features (anticlines) along the NE dipping faults. Both the orientation of the fault and the fold axial traces of the antlicines are less than 45 degrees to the plate boundary, reaffirming the transpressional nature of the boundary.

== Stratigraphy ==
Simple Stratigraphic Column for the Columbus Basin, Trinidad

Most of the sediments within the Columbus basin are mainly sediments deposited in the paleo-Orinoco delta. These are thick Pleistocene to Pliocene deposits covering pre-Pliocene shales. The pre- Pliocene deposits, although not penetrated by wells in the basin, are thought to be Cretaceous marine facies deposited in self break extending west to east. A correlation of nearby onshore deposits supports the idea that the Miocene shales (maybe some Paleocene, Eocene and Oligocene deposits) underlie the Pleistocene to Pliocene units. This Miocene shale unit is considered a part of the Lower Cruse formation and is the source of the many shale diapirs that is found within the basin. The Cretaceous shale is also identified as the probable source rock for the Columbus basin. Based on the correlations presented in the paper by Leonard in 1983, the main stratigraphic units found overlying the Cretaceous shales in the Columbus basin are the Gros Morne, Mayaro, Palmiste and Erin Formation. From the bottom of the stratigraphic column of the basin, there is a general trend of the coarsening of sediment moving up the column. There are said to be three major regressive fluvio-deltaic sediment sequences within the stratigraphic column- the first within the late Miocene, the second regressive sequence in the middle Pliocene, and the third regressive sequence occurring in the mid to late Pliocene. Each regressive sequence is associated with the fall in sea level which led to the progradation of the delta further into the basin. There are coarser grained sands seen within these sections of the stratigraphic column. The major formations found within the basin are described below.

=== Gros Morne Formation ===
The Gros Morne Formation consists of Upper Miocene to Lower Pliocene clastic sedimentary sequences. It can be divided into three sections: Lower, Middle and Upper Gros Morne. The Lower Gros Morne corresponds to the first set of sediments being deposited into the basin as part of the proto-Orinoco delta. It is described from its correlation onshore Southwestern Trinidad as a deep marine shale section with coarsening upward to a shallow marine sand. The Middle Gros Morne is also known as the St. Hillaire silt indicates a regression consisting of silts interbedded with thin sands associated with middle to outer shelf environments. The Upper Gros Morne consists of a reservoir of the Columbus basin as this sedimentary unit is composed mostly of sand deposited in transitional-marine to terrestrial environment.

=== Mayaro Formation ===
The Mayaro Formation is the beginning of another regressive sequence. In the western part of the basin, the Mayaro Formation shifts from thick fine grained sands with alternating layers of silts and clays to a predominantly shale pro-delta unit. Due to how "clean" the layers of sand are, this layer is the most productive of the basin containing large accumulations of hydrocarbons that make up the larger producing fields in the basin including the Poui and Teak fields.

=== Palmiste Formation ===
The Palmiste Formation continues the regressive sequence started in the Mayaro Formation and is deposited in the late Pliocene. This formation shows a similar shift in sedimentary facies as the Mayaro formation. In the western part of the basin, there are thick, medium to fine grained sands with some interbedding with clay and silt, deposited in transitional-marine to terrestrial environment. In the eastern section of the basin, the sediments were deposited in deeper water and hence consisted of basal clay, coarsening upward into clays interbedded with fine grained sands.

=== Erin Formation ===
The Erin Formation is the most recent sequence deposited in the Pleistocene. The deposits consist of transitional marine in the west to shelf slope moving easterly. Currently, in the early Holocene, subsidence or possibly sea level rise of 100–200 feet contributed to deposits of a middle to outer neritic zone environment.

== Relationship of sedimentation and tectonics ==
The Columbus basin has been greatly influenced by sedimentation and tectonic or structural features within the basin and in the surrounding areas. Sedimentation rates were extremely high in the Columbus basin reaching rates as much as 5 to 6 metres per 1000 yr on average for the entire basin with some depocenters reaching rates of 8 metres per 1000 yr. Most of the sediment supply having the most impact on the basin was deposited in the Pliocene and Pleistocene. The regional extension that occurred as a result of the collision of Caribbean and South American plates was enhanced with the failure of normal faults due to the loading caused by increased sedimentation. These normal faults are part of a detachment that only reached the Upper Cretaceous to lower Miocene formations. As the paleo-Orinoco delta deposited sediments of clay and sand above these earlier formations, the sudden increased weight activated and increased the movement along these normal faults. Increase in sediment coupled with the low permeability of the Cretaceous shales underlying the paleo-Orinoco fluvio-deltaic sediments results in high hydrostatic pore fluid pressures within the Cretaceous shales which initiated their movement. As the Cretaceous shale underlies the Pliocene-Pleistocene sediment throughout the entire basin, the movement of shale and shale diapirs are widely common throughout the basin. The mobility of the shale diapirs were also influenced by the thrusting along faults on the Caribbean-South American Boundary and shortening of shale rich sediments of the Barbados accretionary prism.

== Petroleum system ==
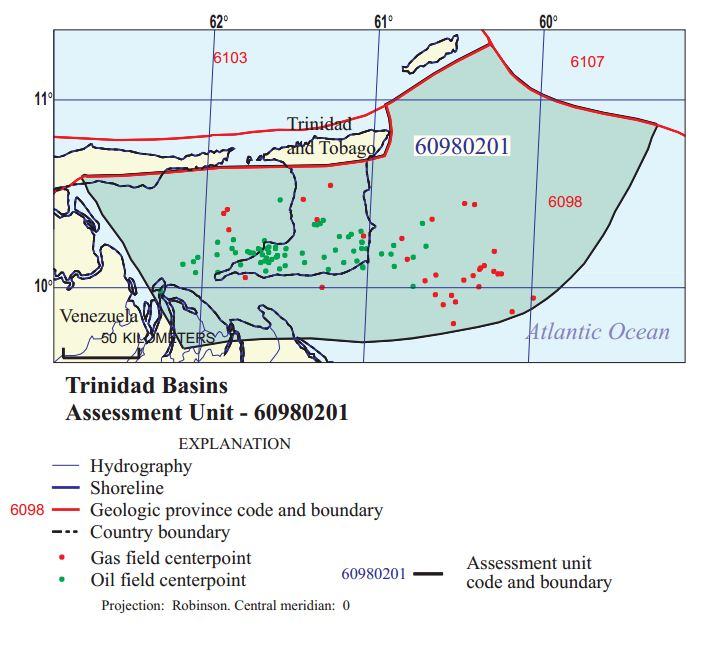
Map Showing the Major exploited Oil and Gas Field in Trinidad and Tobago

The Columbus basin is one of the most important areas for hydrocarbon exploration in Trinidad and Tobago. The shelf and shelf edge are the primary hydrocarbon producing areas of the basin. Oil, gas and condensate make up the hydrocarbon resources found in the Plio-Pleistocene reservoirs of the basin. The generation of petroleum from the Lower Cruse formation is said to be of type II kerogen that is characterized by high oil to gas ratios. The gas to oil ratio of the thermogenic portion of the petroleum within the basin is 60–70% oil dominated in the NW of the basin and 90% gas dominated in the southeast.

=== Sources ===
The source of the hydrocarbons in the Columbus basin is believed to be the shales of the Miocene Lower Cruse Formation and possibly those of the Upper Cretaceous.

=== Migration ===
The NE-SW trending extensional faults that developed as a result of the convergent margin and loading provide pathways for the movement of the hydrocarbon from the Miocene shales to the fluvio-deltaic Orinoco Delta sands of the Pliocene-Pleistocene.

=== Reservoir ===
The reservoirs are the "cleaner" sands of the deltaic sandstones of the Late Miocene to early Pliocene-Pleistocene sequences.

=== Traps ===
The anticline structures that formed as the basin extended and with the activation of normal faults as sediment load increased, act as traps for the hydrocarbons. The faults also can act as traps as well.

=== Seals ===
The seals are the Pleistocene shales of the paleo-Orinoco delta sequences that are interbedded with the medium to fine grained sand reservoirs.

== See also ==
- Caribbean Plate
