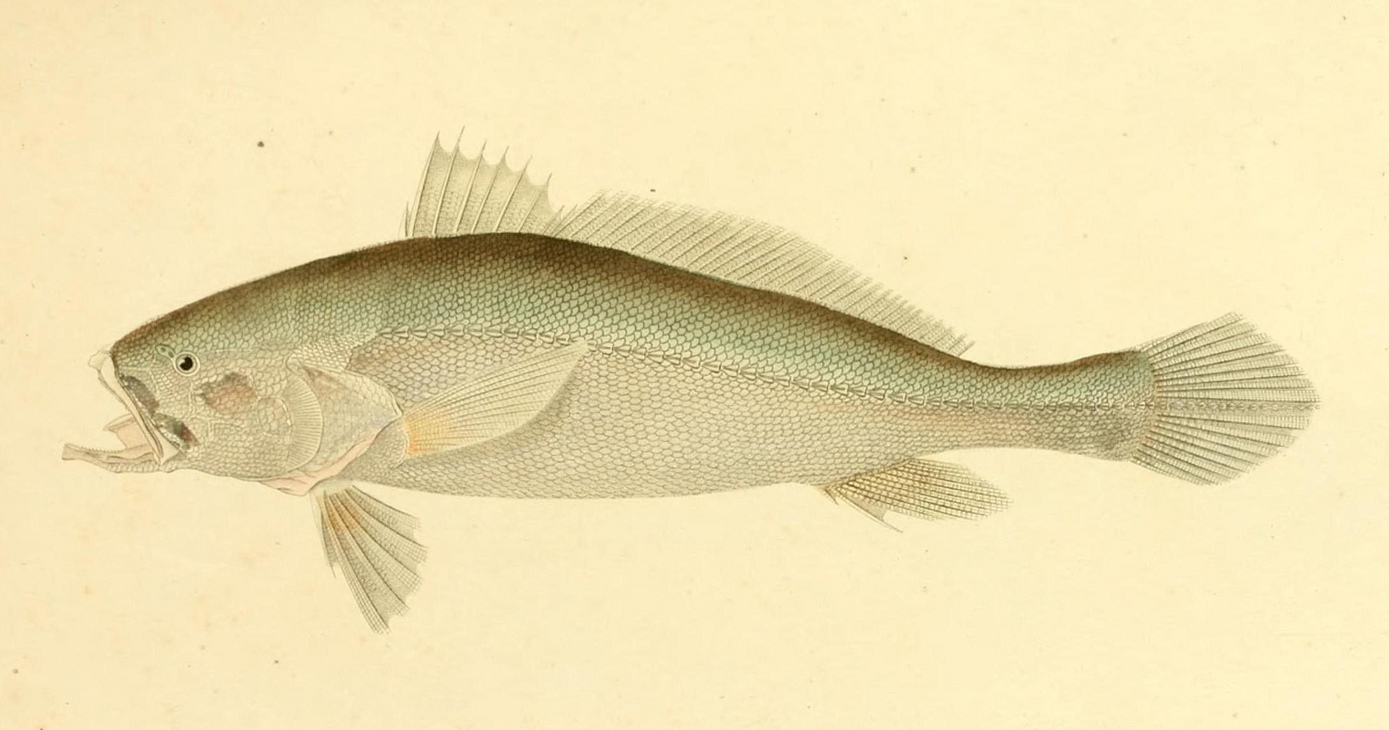
- Nebris microps

Scientific classification
- Kingdom: Animalia
- Phylum: Chordata
- Class: Actinopterygii
- Order: Acanthuriformes
- Family: Sciaenidae
- Genus: Nebris; Cuvier, 1830

Type species
- Nebris microps Cuvier, 1830

= Nebris =

Genus of fishes

Nebris is a small genus of marine ray-finned fishes belonging to the family Sciaenidae, the drums and croakers. There are two species in the genus, one in the Western Atlantic Ocean and one in the Eastern Pacific Ocean.

== Taxonomy ==
Nebris was first proposed as a monospecific genus in 1830 by the French zoologist Georges Cuvier when he described Nbris microps from Surinam. This genus, along with Larimus, has been placed in the subfamily Lariminae by some workers, but the 5th edition of Fishes of the World does not recognise subfamilies within the Sciaenidae, which it places in the order Acanthuriformes.

== Etymology ==
Nebris is Greek and means the hide of a fawn, an allusion Cuvier did not explain, describing N. mictops as solver in lfe and uniformly grey-brown when preserved in alcohol.

== Species ==
There are currently two recognized species in this genus:

- Nebris microps Cuvier, 1830 (Smalleye croaker)
- Nebris occidentalis Vaillant, 1897 (Pacific smalleye croaker)

== Characteristics ==
Nebris croakers have elongate bodies which taper towards the caudal fin with a rounded head, the top of which is compressible, with small eyes. The edge of the preoperculum is smooth. The large, upwards pointing mouth opens to the front and there are no barbels on the chin, although there are 4 tiny pores. The dorsal fin has a large incision and is supported by between 8 and 11 spines and 29 and 32 soft rays. The anal fin is supported by 2 spines and 9 or 10 soft rays. They are covered in small cycloid scales including the dorsal and anal fins. N. microps has a maximum published total length of 40 cm (16 in) while for N. occidentalis it is 60 cm (24 in).

== Distribution and habitat ==
Nebris croakers are found in the western Atlantic and eastern Pacific Oceans. M. micropsoccurs from Colombia to southeastern Brazil in coastal waters and estuaries on sand over mud substrates. M. occidentalis occurs from Guatemala to Peru in the surf zone and in estuaries and coastal lagoons.

== Fisheries and conservation ==
Nebris croakers are important quarry species for fisheries and are regarded as palatable food fish. They have wide distributions and are both classifies as Least Concern by the IUCN.
