= Tethylamna =

Tethylamna Temporal range: Ypresian-Priabonian

Scientific classification
- Kingdom: Animalia
- Phylum: Chordata
- Class: Chondrichthyes
- Subclass: Elasmobranchii
- Division: Selachii
- Order: Lamniformes
- Family: Odontaspididae
- Genus: †Tethylamna; Cappetta & Case, 2016

Type species
- †Tethylamna dunni Cappetta & Case, 2016

Other species
- †T.? twiggsensis (Case, 1981); †T.? koerti (Stromer, 1910)

Synonyms
- T. twiggsensis: Lamna twiggsensis Case, 1981; Cretolamna twiggsensis (Case, 1981); Brachycarcharias twiggsensis (Case, 1981); T. koerti: Otodus koerti (Stromer, 1910); Lamna koerti (Stromer, 1910); Cretalamna koerti (Stromer, 1910); Brachycarcharias koerti? (Stromer, 1910); Serratolamna koerti (Stromer, 1910)

Extinct genus of sharks

Tethylamna is an extinct genus of mackerel sharks that lived during the Eocene. It contains one valid species, T. dunni, and T. twiggsensis. Its fossils have been found in North America, South America, Africa, and Asia. T. twiggsensis has also been assigned to Brachycarcharias, Lamna, and Cretalamna. Some paleontologist suggested that Brachycarcharias koerti might have some relation and could even belong to same genus, making it a possible third species, but this classification hasn't been formalized yet.
