= Manzanilla Formation =

Geologic formation in Trinidad and Tobago

- Stratigraphic range: Middle Miocene
- Type: Formation
- Sub-units: Montserat & San José Members

Location
- Coordinates: 10.6°N 61.1°W
- Approximate paleocoordinates: 10.3°N 58.6°W
- Country: Trinidad and Tobago
- Manzanilla Formation (Trinidad and Tobago)

The Manzanilla Formation is a geologic formation in Trinidad and Tobago. It preserves fossils dating back to the Middle Miocene period.

== Fossil content ==
Among others, the formation has provided fossils of:

- Lamprogrammus manzanilla

== See also ==
- List of fossiliferous stratigraphic units in Trinidad and Tobago
