= Lisbon Formation =

Geologic formation in Georgia, US

- Stratigraphic range: Paleogene
- Type: Formation
- Unit of: Claiborne Group

Lithology
- Primary: Sandstone
- Other: Siltstone, marl

Location
- Region: Georgia, Mississippi, Louisiana
- Country: United States

The Lisbon Formation is a geologic formation in the U.S. state of Georgia. It is predominantly sandstone deposited during the Paleogene Period.

== Characterization ==
Middle Eocene layers, mostly marine or coastal in origin, are found in west central Georgia and compose the Claiborne Group. The group contains the Tallahatta Formation at the bottom layer, followed by the Lisbon Formation in the middle, and the McBean Formation at the top. The Tallahatta Formation is mainly composed of sandstone and clays that formed on land in river systems. Above the Tallahatta is the Lisbon Formation, composed mainly of fossil-bearing clays, fine sands, and limestones that formed as the rising sea level caused the sea to flood over the nonmarine Tallahatta.

== See also ==
- List of fossiliferous stratigraphic units in Georgia (U.S. state)
- Paleontology in Georgia (U.S. state)
