= Punta Guaniquilla =

Protected area in Puerto Rico

Punta Guaniquilla Nature Reserve
- Reserva Natural de Punta Guaniquilla
- IUCN category V (protected landscape/seascape)
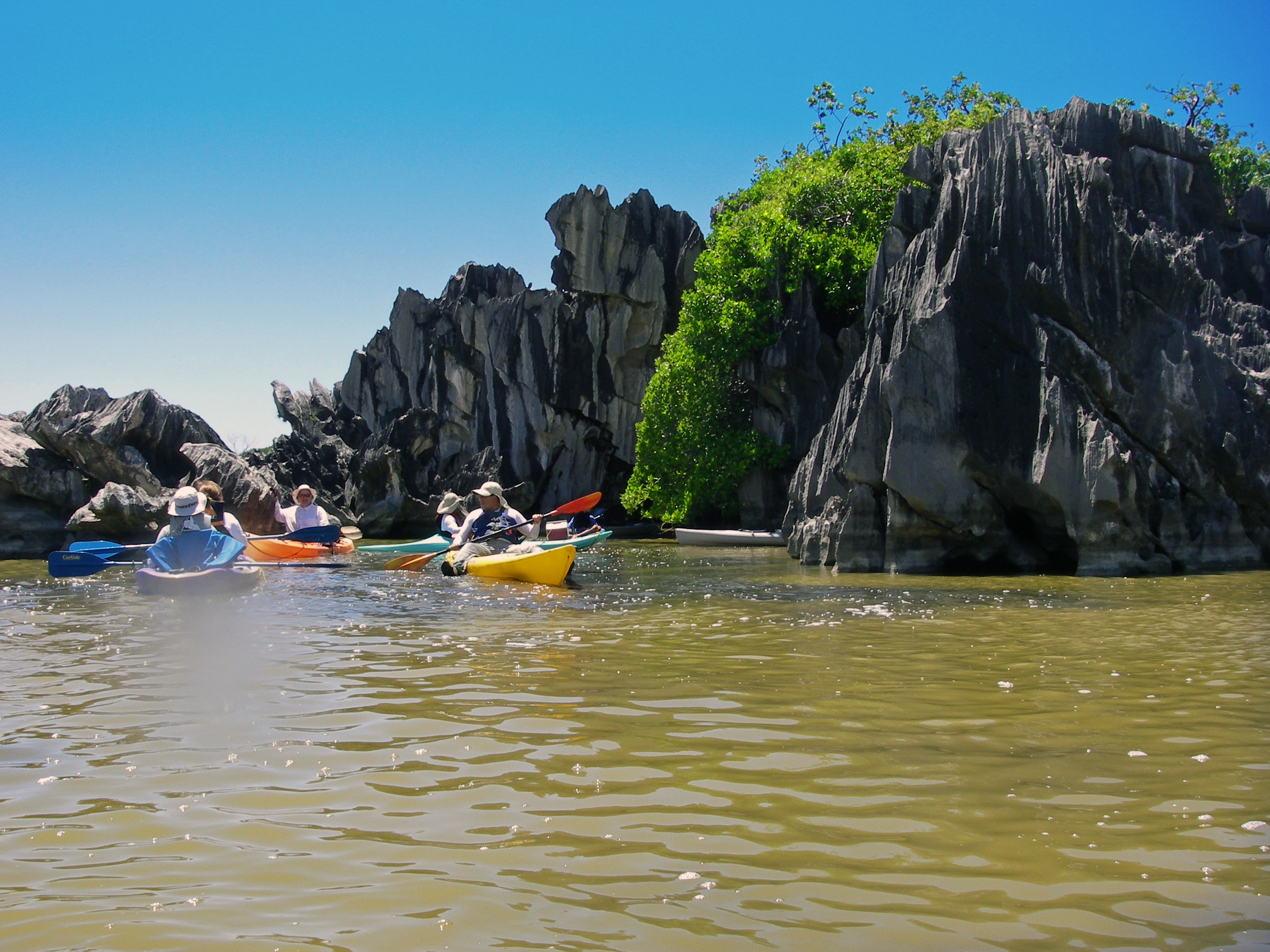
- Karst formations at Laguna Guaniquilla

- Location within Puerto Rico
- Location: Cabo Rojo, Puerto Rico
- Nearest city: Boquerón, Cabo Rojo
- Coordinates: 18°02′15″N 67°12′27″W
- Area: 463 cda (450 acres)
- Established: 1977
- Governing body: Conservation Trust of Puerto Rico, Puerto Rico Department of Natural and Environmental Resources (DRNA)

Punta Guaniquilla (Spanish for Point Guaniquilla) is a headland or small peninsula located immediately to the south of Buyé Beach and north of Boquerón Bay in the municipality of Cabo Rojo, Puerto Rico. The entirety of the headland is protected as the Punta Guaniquilla Nature Reserve (Reserva Natural Punta Guaniquilla) by the Conservation Trust of Puerto Rico and the Puerto Rico Department of Natural and Environmental Resources (Departamento de Recursos Naturales y Ambientales de Puerto Rico, or DRNA for short) since 1977, making it one of the oldest nature reserves officially protected by Puerto Rico Law #150.

The nature reserve is famous for its otherworldly lagoon that contains some of the oldest geologic formations in Puerto Rico, in addition to its beaches, coral reefs, mangroves, dry forests and karst caves, one of which is associated with the pirate and folk figure Roberto Cofresí. Apart from its ecological value, the nature reserve also contains and preserves important archaeological sites associated with the indigenous Taino cultures and, more recently, Hacienda La Romana, a 19th-century sugarcane plantation.

== Geology ==
Punta Guaniquilla forms part of the Puerto Rico southern karst, famous for its red limestone. Dating from the Early Cretaceous, more than 11,000,000 years ago, Punta Guaniquilla also contains some of the oldest geologic formations in Puerto Rico together with the nearby Sierra Bermeja hills. The area also contains strata belonging to the fossil-bearing Cotui Limestone and Sabana Grande Formations. In addition to limestone, the soils also originate from volcanic material that is highly acidic and fertile. Being part of the southern karst region, the area is notable for its caves located towards the relatively hilly center of the peninsula.

== Ecology ==
The environment of the nature reserve belongs to the Puerto Rican dry forest and Greater Antilles mangroves ecoregions.

=== Fauna ===
Punta Guaniquilla is an important biodiversity spot, being home to fifteen of the seventeen endemic bird species of Puerto Rico. Laguna Cartagena also serves as a stopover for migrating birds from as far as the Canadian Arctic tundra and is designated an Important Bird and Biodiversity Area (IBA) by BirdLife International. The reserve is home to at least 81 species of birds, out of which 24 are migratory and 37 are resident. The West Indian whistling duck (Dendrocygna arborea), locally known as chiriría, is one of the most emblematic native bird species protected in the reserve.

=== Flora ===
The reserve is home to 89 species of tree, 77 species of herbs and grasses, and 46 species of bushes and shrubs, with 7 being endemic and most of the others being native to the island. Key plant species include all three species of mangrove native to Puerto Rico in addition to the almácigo (Bursera simaruba), the coast zapote (Manilkara pleeana), the marunguey (Zamia portoricensis), the pipe organ cactus (Pilosocereus armatus, syn. P. royenii var. amatus), the Puerto Rico manjack (Varronia rupicola), the roving pricklypear (Opuntia repens), the West Indian mahogany (Swietenia mahagoni), and the rare bromeliad Hohenbergia antillana.

== History ==
Archaeological evidence shows the area was inhabited by the Taino before and during the arrival of the Spanish during the end of the 15th-century. The area was never formally settled and instead was used for cattle grazing. Throughout its history, some of the caves in the peninsula were used for smuggling, to the point that they were locally associated with the folklore surrounding the pirate Roberto Cofresí, who was active in the area during the early 19th century. Hacienda La Romana was founded however sometime during the 19th century. This sugarcane plantation and refinery that became the most prolific in the area during the 1870s.

The nature reserve was formally established in 1977, making it the third oldest state-level designated nature reserve in Puerto Rico after the Manatí and Punta Yeguas nature reserves, today Hacienda La Esperanza and Inés María Mendoza Nature Reserves, respectively. In 1988 the area also became one of the National Oceanic and Atmospheric Administration–designated Critical Coastal Wildlife Areas of Puerto Rico.

== Recreation ==
The nature reserve today is open to the public. Access to the nature reserve is through Buyé Beach, one of the most popular beaches in the area. It contains various hiking trails and is popular for activities such as kayaking and birdwatching.

== See also ==
- Boquerón State Forest
