= Morne Diablo Limestone =

Geologic formation in Trinidad and Tobago

- Stratigraphic range: Oligocene
- Type: Formation

Lithology
- Primary: Limestone

Location
- Coordinates: 10.1°N 61.5°W
- Approximate paleocoordinates: 9.0°N 56.7°W
- Country: Trinidad and Tobago

Type section
- Named for: Morne Diablo
- Morne Diablo Limestone (Trinidad and Tobago)

The Morne Diablo Limestone is a geologic formation in Morne Diablo (pronounced, in the local English dialect, "Mun Jablo"), Trinidad and Tobago. It preserves fossils dating back to the Oligocene period. The formation is laterally equivalent to the Cipero Marl and San Fernando Formation.

== See also ==
- List of fossiliferous stratigraphic units in Trinidad and Tobago
