= Anguilla Formation =

- Stratigraphic range: Burdigalian-Serravallian
- Type: Formation

Lithology
- Primary: Limestone
- Other: Bafflestone, framestone

Location
- Coordinates: 18.2°N 63.1°W
- Approximate paleocoordinates: 18.1°N 62.0°W
- Country: Anguilla

Type section
- Named for: Anguilla
- Anguilla Formation (Anguilla)

The Anguilla Formation is a geologic formation in Anguilla. It preserves fossils dating back to the Burdigalian to Serravallian period (i.e. 20–12 million years ago).

== See also ==
- List of fossiliferous stratigraphic units in Anguilla
