= Rocky Bay =

Rocky Bay may refer to:

- Rocky Bay Formation, geological formation in Bermuda
- Rocky Bay, New Zealand, in Whitireia Park
- Rocky Bay (Newfoundland and Labrador), Canada
- Rocky Bay, Nova Scotia, Canada
- Rocky Bay (Queensland), Australia, on Magnetic Island
- Rocky Bay (South Georgia), British Overseas Territory

== See also ==
- Rocky Cove, Maxwell Bay, King George Island, Antarctica
- Rocky River (Alaska); flows into Rocky Bay
- Rocky Boy (disambiguation)
- Rottnest Island; has a feature named Rocky Bay
