= Cervicos Limestone =

- Stratigraphic range: Late Oligocene
- Type: Formation

Lithology
- Primary: Limestone

Location
- Coordinates: 19.4°N 70.8°W
- Approximate paleocoordinates: 18.6°N 69.8°W
- Country: Dominican Republic
- Cervicos Limestone (the Dominican Republic)

The Cervicos Limestone is a geologic formation in the Dominican Republic. It preserves fossils dating back to the Late Oligocene period, as Orthaulax aquadillensis and Clypeaster concavus.

== See also ==
- List of fossiliferous stratigraphic units in the Dominican Republic
