= Belmont Formation =

Belmont Formation may refer to:

- Belmont Formation, Bermuda, a Middle Pleistocene geologic formation of Bermuda
- Belmont Formation, Grenada, an Early Miocene geologic formation of Grenada
- Belmont Conglomerate, a member of the Newcastle Coal Measures, Australia
