= Boundstone (rock) =

Type of carbonate rock

A boundstone is a special type of carbonate rock in the Dunham classification.

== Description ==
In the original classification by Dunham (1962), boundstones are defined as "carbonate rocks showing signs of being bound during deposition [...]. The signs of binding are specific and occur within the sample being classified".

In the modified Dunham classification by Embry and Klovan (1971), boundstones in the sense of Dunham are subdivided into bafflestones, bindstones and framestones. The term "boundstone" is retained for authochthonous limestones in which the specific mode of organic binding cannot be recognized.

Lokier and Al Nunaibi (2016) define boundstone as "an autochthonous carbonate-dominated rock in which there is any form of evidence that the original components were organically bound at the time of deposition; however, the mode of binding is not identifiable." In contrast to Embry and Klovan, they do not subdivide boundstones into smaller classes.
