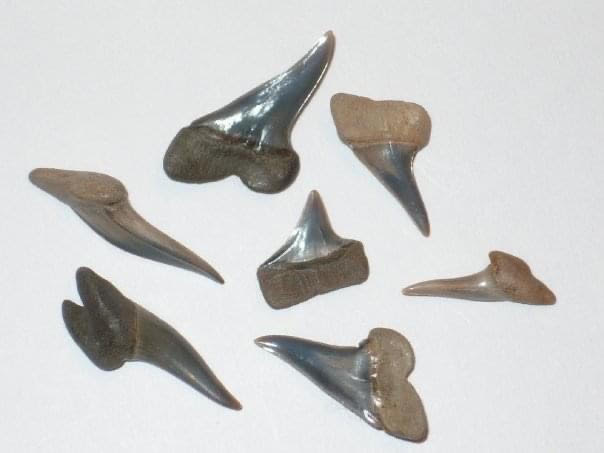
- Xiphodolamia ensis teeth from the London Clay

Scientific classification
- Kingdom: Animalia
- Phylum: Chordata
- Class: Chondrichthyes
- Subclass: Elasmobranchii
- Division: Selachii
- Order: Lamniformes
- Family: †Xiphodolamiidae; Glükman 1964
- Genus: †Xiphodolamia; Leidy, 1877

Species
- Xiphodolamia barbadica Casier 1958; Xiphodolamia ensis Leidy 1877; Xiphodolamia eocaena Woodward 1889; Xiphodolamia maliki Artüz & Sakınç 2025; Xiphodolamia morricei Jordan and Beal 1910; Xiphodolamia serrata Adnet et al. 2009

= Xiphodolamia =

Xiphodolamia Temporal range: Eocene

Extinct genus of Mackerel shark

Xiphodolamia is a rare extinct genus of mackerel shark which lived during the Eocene epoch. It is the only known member of the extinct family Xiphodolamiidae. It is only known from isolated teeth, but has been found in Europe, Africa, and Asia. It is assumed to be pelagic, occurring more frequently in deeper water deposits, most notably the London Clay and Eocene deposits in Denmark. It is distinguished by its rectangular root and twisted blade, unique among mackerel sharks. It is unclear what niche this specialized dentition helped exploit.

== Taxonomy and affinities ==
The following species have been attributed to Xiphodolamia:

- X. ensis
- X. maliki
- X. serrata
- X. eocaena(?)
- X. barbadica(?)

X. barbadica was described from the Lutetian-aged Scotland Formation of the West Indies, and X eocaena was treated as the Ypresian-aged North American and European representative. X. ensis was originally described out of the early-middle Eocene of Central Asia and Jordan. However, X. barbadica and X. eocaeana are not easily discernable from the type species X. ensis, and most recent authors have treated them as junior synonyms. X. serrata is a serrated variety known from the Upper Eocene of Africa and Arabia. It appears to be the culmination of a singular evolving lineage, and thus Xiphodolamia is an example of anagensis. The development of serrations in Xiphodolamia mirrors that of Otodus in the Ypresian, and thus is an example of convergent evolution. This genus is not known to have survived into the Oligocene. Though in the past the genus has been placed in many orders, it is now the consensus Xiphodolamia is an unusual member of the order Lamniformes. However, its placement within Lamniformes is uncertain, especially its relationship to Lamnidae and Isurus. Some have placed it in its own family, Xiphidolamnidae. It is unlikely this matter will be resolved until associated material or transitional fossils are found and described.

== Paleobiogeography ==
Xiphodolamia is widely but thinly spread. The following places have produced Xiphodolamia teeth:

=== North America ===
- Maryland (Nanjemoy Formation)
- South Carolina (Santee Limestone)
- Barbados (Scotland Beds)
- New Jersey

=== Europe ===
- England (London Clay)
- Belgium (Tielt Formation)
- The Netherlands (Dongen Formation)
- Italy
- Romania
- Slovakia

=== Asia ===
- Kazakhstan (Tologaysor Formation)
- Jordan
- Iran
- Turkey (Soğucak Formation)

=== Africa ===
- Angola
- Togo
