= Antigua Formation =

Geologic formation in Antigua and Barbuda

- Stratigraphic range: Late Oligocene
- Type: Formation
- Sub-units: Long Bay Member
- Overlies: Central Plain Group

Lithology
- Primary: Limestone
- Other: Claystone, sandstone, marl, packstone, rudstone, framestone

Location
- Coordinates: 17.1°N 61.9°W
- Region: Antigua
- Country: Antigua and Barbuda

Type section
- Named for: Antigua
- Antigua Formation (Antigua and Barbuda)

The Antigua Formation is a geologic formation in Antigua and Barbuda. It preserves fossils dating back to the Late Oligocene period.

== See also ==
- List of fossiliferous stratigraphic units in Antigua and Barbuda
