= Pepino Formation =

Pepino Formation may refer to:

- Pepino Formation, Puerto Rico, Paleogene geologic formation of Puerto Rico
- Pepino Formation, Colombia, Paleogene geologic formation of Colombia, in the Llanos Basin
