= Canímar Formation =

Geologic formation in Matanzas Province, Cuba

- Stratigraphic range: Late Miocene-Pliocene
- Type: Formation

Lithology
- Primary: Packstone

Location
- Coordinates: 23.0°N 81.5°W
- Approximate paleocoordinates: 23.2°N 78.8°W
- Region: Matanzas Province
- Country: Cuba

Type section
- Named for: Canímar River
- Canímar Formation (Cuba)

The Canímar Formation is a geologic formation in Cuba. It preserves fossils dating back to the Late Miocene to Pliocene period. Among others, fossils of megalodon have been found in the formation.

== Fossil content ==
- Carcharocles megalodon
- Euphylax domingensis

== See also ==
- List of fossiliferous stratigraphic units in Cuba
