= Habana Formation =

Geologic formation

- Stratigraphic range: Late Campanian-Maastrichtian; ~72–66 Ma
- Type: Formation
- Sub-units: Titanosarcolites Beds

Lithology
- Primary: Limestone

Location
- Coordinates: 22.2°N 79.8°W
- Approximate paleocoordinates: 21.2°N 63.6°W
- Region: Pinar del Río & Sancti Spíritus Provinces
- Country: Cuba

Type section
- Named for: La Habana
- Named by: Robert H. Palmer
- Year defined: 1934
- Habana Formation (Cuba)

The Habana Formation is a geologic formation in Cuba. It preserves mainly gastropod and rudist fossils dating back to the Late Campanian to Maastrichtian periods. The formation was defined by Robert H. Palmer in 1934.

== See also ==
- List of fossiliferous stratigraphic units in Cuba
