= Highlands Formation =

Geologic formation in Antigua and Barbuda

- Stratigraphic range: Pliocene; ~5.3–2.6 Ma
- Type: Formation

Lithology
- Primary: Limestone
- Other: Bindstone

Location
- Coordinates: 17.6°N 61.8°W
- Region: Barbuda
- Country: Antigua and Barbuda
- Highlands Formation (Antigua and Barbuda)

The Highlands Formation is a geologic formation in Antigua and Barbuda. It preserves fossils of megalodon dating back to the Pliocene period. Among others, the formation has provided fossils of megalodon.

== See also ==
- List of fossiliferous stratigraphic units in Antigua and Barbuda
