= Artibonite =

Artibonite may refer to:

- Artibonite (department), an administrative subdivision of Haiti
- Artibonite River, a river in Haiti and the longest in Hispaniola
- Artibonite Valley, a valley predominantly in Haiti but also extends a bit in the Dominican Republic
- Artibonite Group, a geologic group in Haiti
- Petite Rivière de l'Artibonite, a commune in the Dessalines Arrondissement, of the department of Artibonite in Haiti
