= Aymamón Limestone =

Geologic formation in Puerto Rico

- Stratigraphic range: Mid-to-Late Miocene; ~16.0–5.3 Ma
- Type: Formation

Lithology
- Primary: Limestone
- Other: Chalk

Location
- Coordinates: 18.5°N 67.0°W
- Approximate paleocoordinates: 18.4°N 66.0°W
- Region: Caribbean
- Country: Puerto Rico
- Aymamón Limestone (Puerto Rico)

The Aymamón Limestone is a geologic formation in Puerto Rico. It preserves fossils dating back to the Middle to Late Miocene period.

== Fossil content ==
Various fossils have been found in the Aymamón Limestone:

=== Sharks ===
- Megalodon

=== Bivalves ===
- Acar domingensis
- Arca imbricata
- Mimachlamys canalis

=== Gastropods ===
- Bulla umbilicata
- Chicoreus (Triplex) cornurectus
- Hindsiclava consors
- Orthaulax aguadillensis
- Orthaulax portoricoensis
- Vokesimurex messorius

=== Corals ===
- Agaricia sp.
- Favia sp.
- Goniopora sp.
- Meandrina (Placocyathus) sp.
- Montastraea sp.
- Porites sp.
- Siderastrea sp.
- Solenastrea sp.
- Stephanocoenia sp.
- Stylophora sp.

== See also ==
- List of fossiliferous stratigraphic units in Puerto Rico
