= San Fernando Formation =

San Fernando Formation may refer to:

- San Fernando Formation, Trinidad and Tobago, Paleogene geologic formation of Trinidad and Tobago
- San Fernando Formation, Colombia, Oligocene geologic formation of Colombia
