= Grand Bay Formation =

Geologic formation in Grenada

- Stratigraphic range: Middle Miocene
- Type: Formation

Lithology
- Primary: Tuff
- Other: Sandstone

Location
- Coordinates: 12.4°N 61.4°W
- Approximate paleocoordinates: 12.1°N 61.1°W
- Region: Carriacou
- Country: Grenada
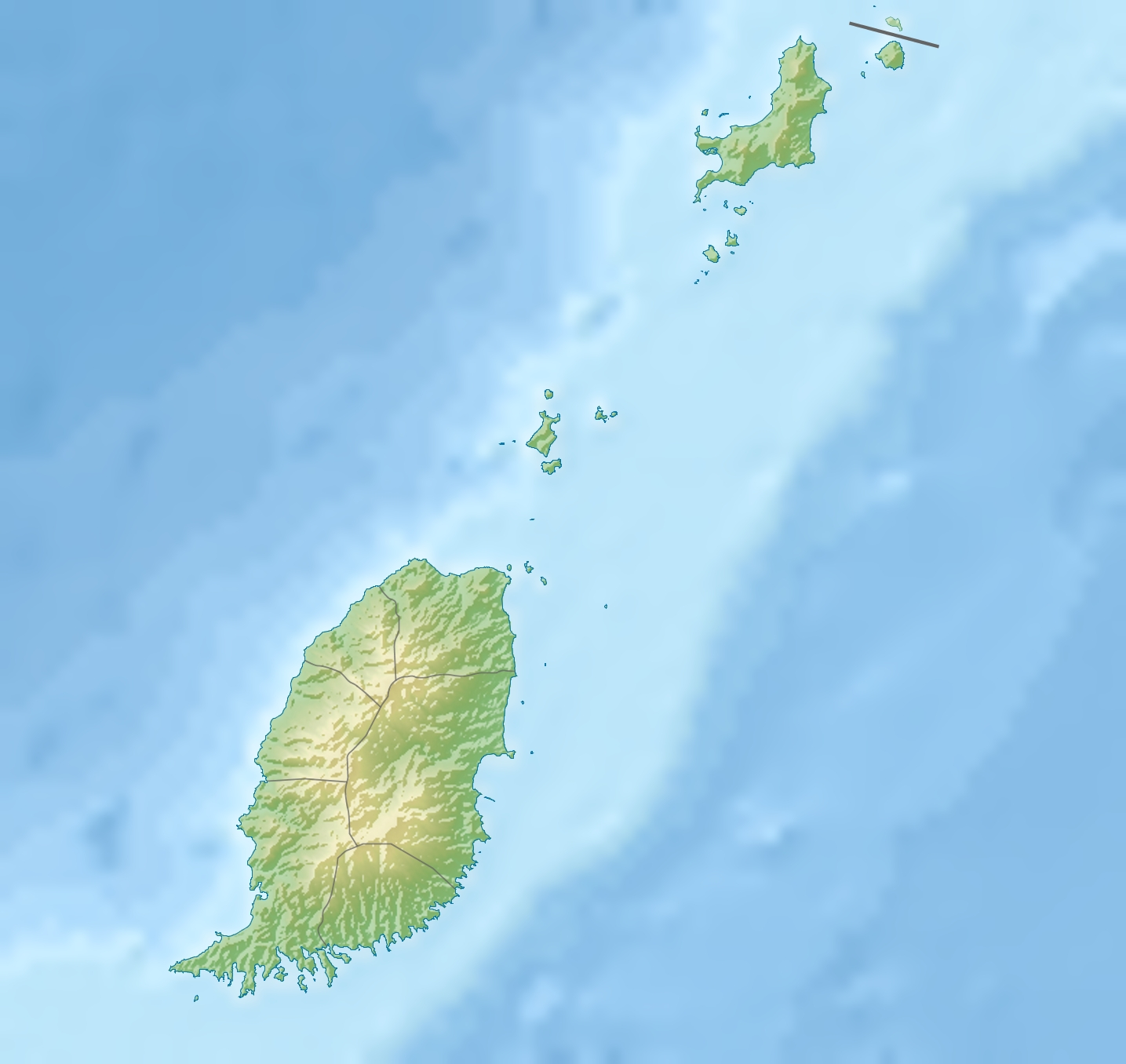
- Grand Bay Formation (Grenada)

The Grand Bay Formation is a geologic formation in Grenada. It preserves fossils dating back to the Middle Miocene period.

== Fossil content ==
- Ophiocamax ventosa
- Paragonaster(?) haldixoni
- Torqueoliva

== See also ==
- List of fossiliferous stratigraphic units in Grenada
