= August Town Formation =

Geologic formation in Jamaica

- Stratigraphic range: Neogene
- Type: Formation

Location
- Country: Jamaica

The August Town Formation is a geologic formation in Jamaica. It preserves fossils dating back to the Neogene period.

The August Town Formation comprises sandy limestones and calcareous sandstones with sporadic clays or conglomerates (James-Williamson, S and Mitchell S.F 2012). The age is Mid Miocene to Pliocene. It was first described by Matley (1951). Matley (1951) describes the August Town Formation as fossiliferous sands, gravels and calcareous marls.

The August Town Formation is a part of the Coastal Group of Jamaica.

== See also ==
- List of fossiliferous stratigraphic units in Jamaica
