= Swanswick Formation =

Geologic formation in Jamaica

- Stratigraphic range: Paleogene
- Type: Formation

Location
- Country: Jamaica

The Swanswick Formation is a geologic formation in Jamaica. It preserves fossils dating back to the Paleogene period.

== See also ==
- List of fossiliferous stratigraphic units in Jamaica
