= Baitoa Formation =

Geologic formation in the Dominican Republic

- Stratigraphic range: Burdigalian-Langhian
- Type: Formation
- Underlies: Cercado Formation
- Overlies: Tabera Formation

Lithology
- Primary: Siltstone, limestone

Location
- Coordinates: 19.3°N 70.7°W
- Approximate paleocoordinates: 19.2°N 69.5°W
- Country: Dominican Republic
- Baitoa Formation (the Dominican Republic)

The Baitoa Formation is a geologic formation in Dominican Republic. The formation consists of siltstones and limestones deposited in a shallow marine to reef environment. The formation, unconformably overlying the Tabera Formation and unconformably overlain by the Cercado Formation, preserves bivalve, gastropod, echinoid and coral fossils dating back to the Burdigalian to Langhian period.

== See also ==
- List of fossiliferous stratigraphic units in the Dominican Republic
- La Toca Formation
- El Mamey Formation
