= Mount Peace Formation =

Geologic formation in Jamaica

- Stratigraphic range: Late Santonian; ~85 Ma
- Type: Formation
- Sub-units: Clifton Limestone

Lithology
- Primary: Limestone
- Other: Shale

Location
- Coordinates: 18.4°N 78.1°W
- Approximate paleocoordinates: 17.0°N 63.9°W
- Region: Hanover Parish
- Country: Jamaica

Type section
- Named for: Mount Peace
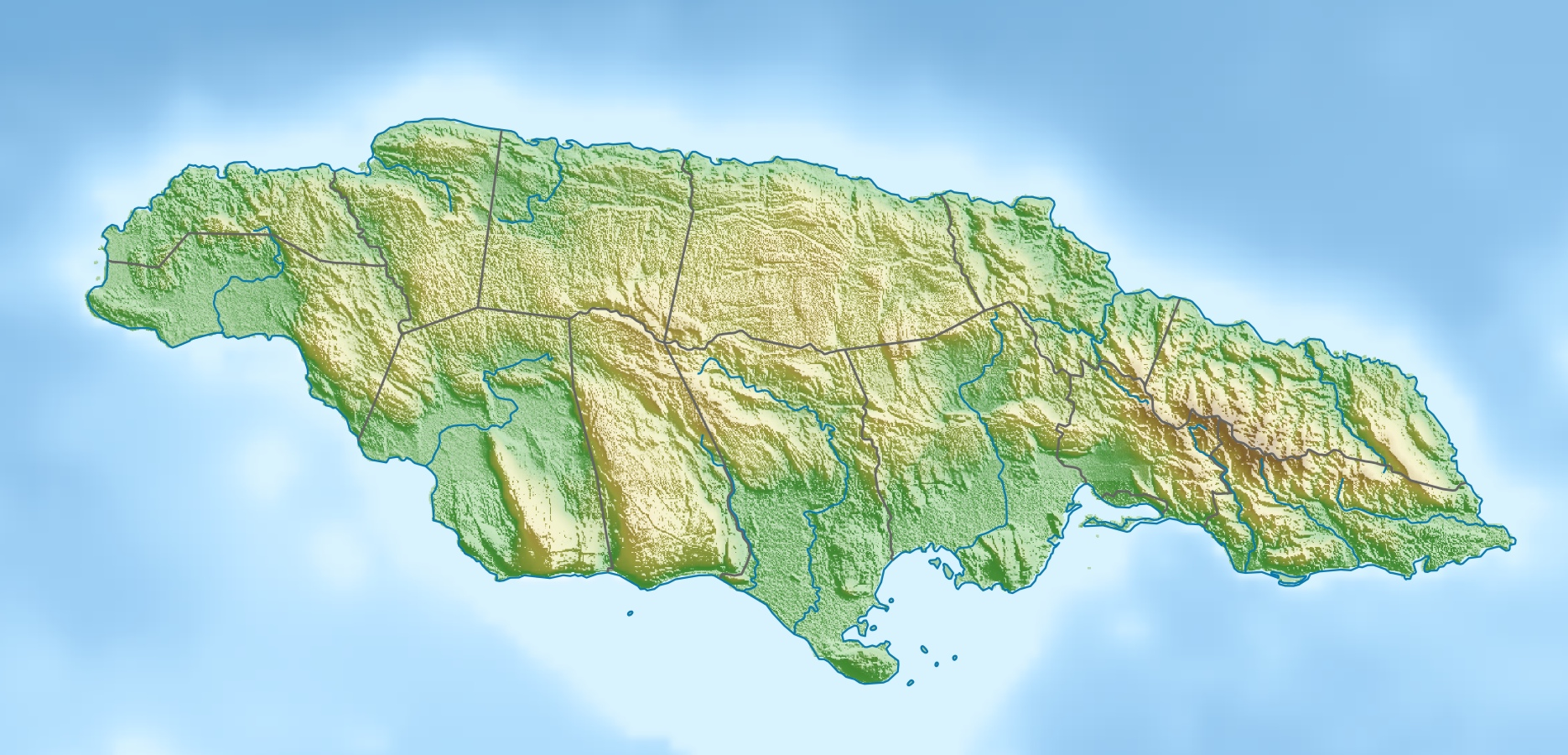
- Mount Peace Formation (Jamaica)

The Mount Peace Formation is a geologic formation in Jamaica. It preserves ammonite, bivalve and echinoid fossils dating back to the Late Santonian stage of the Cretaceous period.

== See also ==
- List of fossiliferous stratigraphic units in Jamaica
