= Tamana Formation =

Geologic formation in Trinidad and Tobago

- Stratigraphic range: Burdigalian-Serravallian
- Type: Formation
- Sub-units: Guaracara Limestone

Lithology
- Primary: Limestone

Location
- Coordinates: 10.3°N 61.4°W
- Approximate paleocoordinates: 10.0°N 58.5°W
- Country: Trinidad and Tobago

Type section
- Named for: Tamana Caves
- Tamana Formation (Trinidad and Tobago)

The Tamana Formation is a geologic formation in Trinidad and Tobago. It preserves fossils dating back to the Burdigalian to Serravallian period.

== See also ==
- List of fossiliferous stratigraphic units in Trinidad and Tobago
