= Coastal Group =

Geologic group in Jamaica

- Stratigraphic range: Neogene
- Type: Group

Location
- Country: Jamaica

The Coastal Group is a geologic group in Jamaica, that preserves fossils.

== See also ==
- List of fossiliferous stratigraphic units in Jamaica
