= Guinea Corn Formation =

Geologic formation in Jamaica

- Stratigraphic range: Maastrichtian
- Type: Formation

Location
- Country: Jamaica

The Guinea Corn Formation is a geologic formation in Jamaica. It preserves fossils dating back to the Cretaceous period.

== IUGS geological heritage site ==
In respect of it being the 'most diverse and thickest limestone succession with abundant rudist bivalves within the Caribbean faunal province', the International Union of Geological Sciences (IUGS) included the 'Late Cretaceous rudist bivalves of the Caribbean Province' (Rio Minho, Clarendon parish) in its assemblage of 100 'geological heritage sites' around the world in a listing published in October 2022. The organisation defines an IUGS Geological Heritage Site as 'a key place with geological elements and/or processes of international scientific relevance, used as a reference, and/or with a substantial contribution to the development of geological sciences through history.'

== Fossil content ==
Color key: Taxon / Reclassified taxon / Taxon falsely reported as present / Dubious taxon or junior synonym / Ichnotaxon / Ootaxon / Morphotaxon	Notes; Uncertain or tentative taxa are in small text; ~~crossed out~~ taxa are discredited.

=== Crustaceans ===
Crustaceans of the Guinea Corn Formation
Genus	Species	Location	Stratigraphic position	Material	Notes	Image
Amphicytherura	A. grandicribra	Rio Minho, Jamaica	Maastrichtian		A schizocytherid ostracod	
Asciocythere	A. cabbagehillensis	Rio Minho, Jamaica	Maastrichtian		A cytherideid ostracod	
Aysegulina	A. chapeltonensis	Rio Minho, Jamaica	Maastrichtian		A hemicytherid ostracod	
Aysegulina	A. riominhoensis	Rio Minho, Jamaica	Maastrichtian		A hemicytherid ostracod	
Aysegulina	A. sagitta	Rio Minho, Jamaica	Maastrichtian		A hemicytherid ostracod	
Aysegulina	A. ventrocurva	Rio Minho, Jamaica	Maastrichtian		A hemicytherid ostracod	
Brachycythere	B. jamaicaensis	Rio Minho, Jamaica	Maastrichtian		A trachyleberidid ostracod	
Buntonia	B. nana	Rio Minho, Jamaica	Maastrichtian		A trachyleberidid ostracod	
Buntonia	B. vulgaris	Rio Minho, Jamaica	Maastrichtian		A trachyleberidid ostracod	
Cytherelloidea	C. guineacornensis	Rio Minho, Jamaica	Maastrichtian		A cytherellid ostracod	
Dinglecythere	D. occulta	Rio Minho, Jamaica	Maastrichtian		A schizocytherid ostracod	
Eocytheropteron	E. hazeli	Rio Minho, Jamaica	Maastrichtian		A cytherurid ostracod	
Eocytheropteron	E. jamaicaensis	Rio Minho, Jamaica	Maastrichtian		A cytherurid ostracod	
Eucytherura	E. mitchelli	Rio Minho, Jamaica	Maastrichtian		A cytherurid ostracod	
Floricythereis	F. exquisita	Rio Minho, Jamaica	Maatrichtian		A trachyleberidid ostracod	
Hemiparacytheridea	H. exquisita	Rio Minho, Jamaica	Maastrichtian		A paracytherideid ostracod	
Leiocythereis	L. polita	Rio Minho, Jamaica	Maastrichtian		A trachyleberidid ostracod	
Loxoconcha	L. pindarsensis	Rio Minho, Jamaica	Maastrichtian		A loxoconchid ostracod	
Ovocytheridea	O. rotunda	Rio Minho, Jamaica	Maastrichtian		A cytherideid ostracod	
Phrixocythere	P. unionensis	Rio Minho, Jamaica	Maastrichtian		A hemicytherid ostracod	
Pterygocythereis	P. babinoti	Rio Minho, Jamaica	Maastrichtian		A trachyleberidid ostracod	
Schizoptocythere	S. nana	Rio Minho, Jamaica	Maastrichtian		A trachyleberidid ostracod	
Schizoptocythere	S. pinna	Rio Minho, Jamaica	Maastrichtian		A trachyleberidid ostracod	
Schuleridea	S. exigua	Rio Minho, Jamaica	Maastrichtian		A cytherideid ostracod	
Spinicytheridea	S. compta	Rio Minho, Jamaica	Maastrichtian		A cytherideid ostracod	

== See also ==
- List of fossiliferous stratigraphic units in Jamaica
