= Melones Formation =

Geologic formation in Puerto Rico

- Stratigraphic range: Cretaceous
- Type: Formation

Location
- Country: Puerto Rico

The Melones Formation is a geologic formation in Puerto Rico. It preserves fossils dating back to the Cretaceous period.

== See also ==
- List of fossiliferous stratigraphic units in Puerto Rico
