= Piragua Formation =

Geologic formation in Cuba

- Stratigraphic range: Santonian; ~85.8–84.9 Ma
- Type: Formation

Lithology
- Primary: Limestone
- Other: Tuff

Location
- Coordinates: 21.5°N 77.8°W
- Approximate paleocoordinates: 12.5°N 57.1°W
- Region: Camagüey Province
- Country: Cuba
- Piragua Formation (Cuba)

The Piragua Formation is a geologic formation in Cuba. The limestone intercalated with tuff formation preserves rudist fossils dating back to the Santonian period.

== Fossil content ==
- Durania curasavica, D. lopeztrigoi
- Praebarrettia corrali
- Torreites tschoppi
- Vaccinites inaequicostatus
- Plagioptychus sp.
- ?Mitrocaprina sp.

== See also ==
- List of fossiliferous stratigraphic units in Cuba
