= Quebradillas Limestone =

Geologic formation in Puerto Rico

- Stratigraphic range: Neogene
- Type: Formation

Lithology
- Primary: Limestone

Location
- Region: Caribbean
- Country: Puerto Rico

The Quebradillas Limestone is a geologic formation in Puerto Rico. It preserves fossils dating back to the Neogene period.

== See also ==
- List of fossiliferous stratigraphic units in Puerto Rico
- Quebradillas, Puerto Rico
