= Rio Grande Formation =

Geologic formation in Jamaica

- Stratigraphic range: Cretaceous
- Type: Formation

Location
- Country: Jamaica

The Rio Grande Formation is a geologic formation in Jamaica. It preserves fossils dating back to the Cretaceous period.

== See also ==
- List of fossiliferous stratigraphic units in Jamaica
