= Orthaulax gabbi =

Scientific classification
- Kingdom: Animalia
- Phylum: Mollusca
- Class: Gastropoda
- Subclass: Caenogastropoda
- Order: Littorinimorpha
- Family: Strombidae
- Genus: Orthaulax
- Species: O. gabbi

Binomial name
- Orthaulax gabbi (Dall, 1890)

Extinct species of sea snail

Orthaulax gabbi is an extinct sea snail of the family Orthaulax first described by William Healey Dall in 1890. O. gabbi was around 70mm long and is thought to have gone extinct in the Miocene period.

Fossils of O. gabbi have been found most prolifically in Florida and Panama.
