= Hope Gate Formation =

Geological Formations

August Town Formation
- Stratigraphic range: Neogene
- Type: Formation

Location
- Country: Jamaica

The August Town Formation is a geologic formation in Jamaica. It preserves fossils dating back to the Neogene period.

== See also ==
- List of fossiliferous stratigraphic units in Jamaica
