= Cerros de Sal Formation =

Geologic formation in the Dominican Republic

- Stratigraphic range: Late Miocene
- Type: Formation

Lithology
- Primary: Claystone

Location
- Coordinates: 18.3°N 71.4°W
- Approximate paleocoordinates: 18.2°N 70.6°W
- Country: Dominican Republic
- Cerros de Sal Formation (the Dominican Republic)

The Cerros de Sal Formation is a geologic formation in the southern Dominican Republic. The coastal claystone preserves coral fossils dating back to the Late Miocene period.

== See also ==
- List of fossiliferous stratigraphic units in the Dominican Republic
