= Tamana Caves =

Cave in Trinidad and Tobago

Tamana Caves (or Tamana Cave) is a cave system located on the northern slope of Mount Tamana in eastern Trinidad. Mount Tamana is a 307-metre flat topped hill of Miocene Guaracara Limestone of the Tamana Formation in the eastern Central Range.

Julian Kenny described the main cave as consisting of 18 separate sections. He documented two chimneys and a "walk-in chamber". The walk-in chamber connected to a "boulder chamber" that was heavily used by bats, and to a crawl hole which connected to the remainder of the cave system. Beyond the crawl hole was a subterranean stream and a passage which connected to the chimney area. Beyond that the passages descended further, ending in what Kenny called the "New Deep" and the "Far Deep", areas which had not been explored at the time of his publication.

Kenny reported that eleven bat species permanently roosted in the cave, while a twelfth species roosted occasionally in an adjacent dry cave. Certain species were restricted to specific areas of the cave, while others were scattered throughout.
