= Grotto Beach Formation =

Geologic formation in the Bahamas

- Stratigraphic range: Mid-Late Pleistocene
- Type: Formation
- Sub-units: Cockburn Town Member

Lithology
- Primary: Limestone
- Other: Grainstone

Location
- Coordinates: 24.0°N 74.5°W
- Region: San Salvador Island
- Country: Bahamas
- Grotto Beach Formation (Bahamas)

The Grotto Beach Formation is a geologic formation in the Bahamas. It preserves fossils dating back to the Middle to Late Pleistocene period.

== See also ==
- List of fossiliferous stratigraphic units in the Bahamas
