= Consuelo Formation =

Geologic formation in Cuba

- Stratigraphic range: Priabonian
- Type: Formation
- Underlies: Tinguaro Formation
- Overlies: Príncipe & Capdevila Formations

Lithology
- Primary: Marl
- Other: Micritic limestone

Location
- Coordinates: 21.4°N 78.3°W
- Approximate paleocoordinates: 21.2°N 71.3°W
- Region: La Habana Province
- Country: Cuba

Type section
- Named for: Consuelo Tejar quarry
- Named by: Bermúdez
- Year defined: 1950
- Consuelo Formation (Cuba)

The Consuelo Formation is a geologic formation in Cuba. It preserves fossils dating back to the Priabonian period. The formation is correlated with the Chapapote Formation of Mexico and the Jackson Formation of the United States.

== Description ==
The Consuelo Formation was described by Bermúdez in 1950 based on a section of marls in the Consuelo El Tejar quarry in La Habana Province. The formation overlies the Príncipe and Capdevila Formations with an unconformity, and is overlain by the Tinguaro Formation. The Consuelo Formation consists of yellow to creamy-white calcareous marls and white micritic limestones.

== Fossil content ==
- Cidaris cubensis
- Histocidaris sanchezi

== See also ==
- List of fossiliferous stratigraphic units in Cuba
