= Ponce Limestone =

- Stratigraphic range: Neogene; ~23.03–2.5 Ma
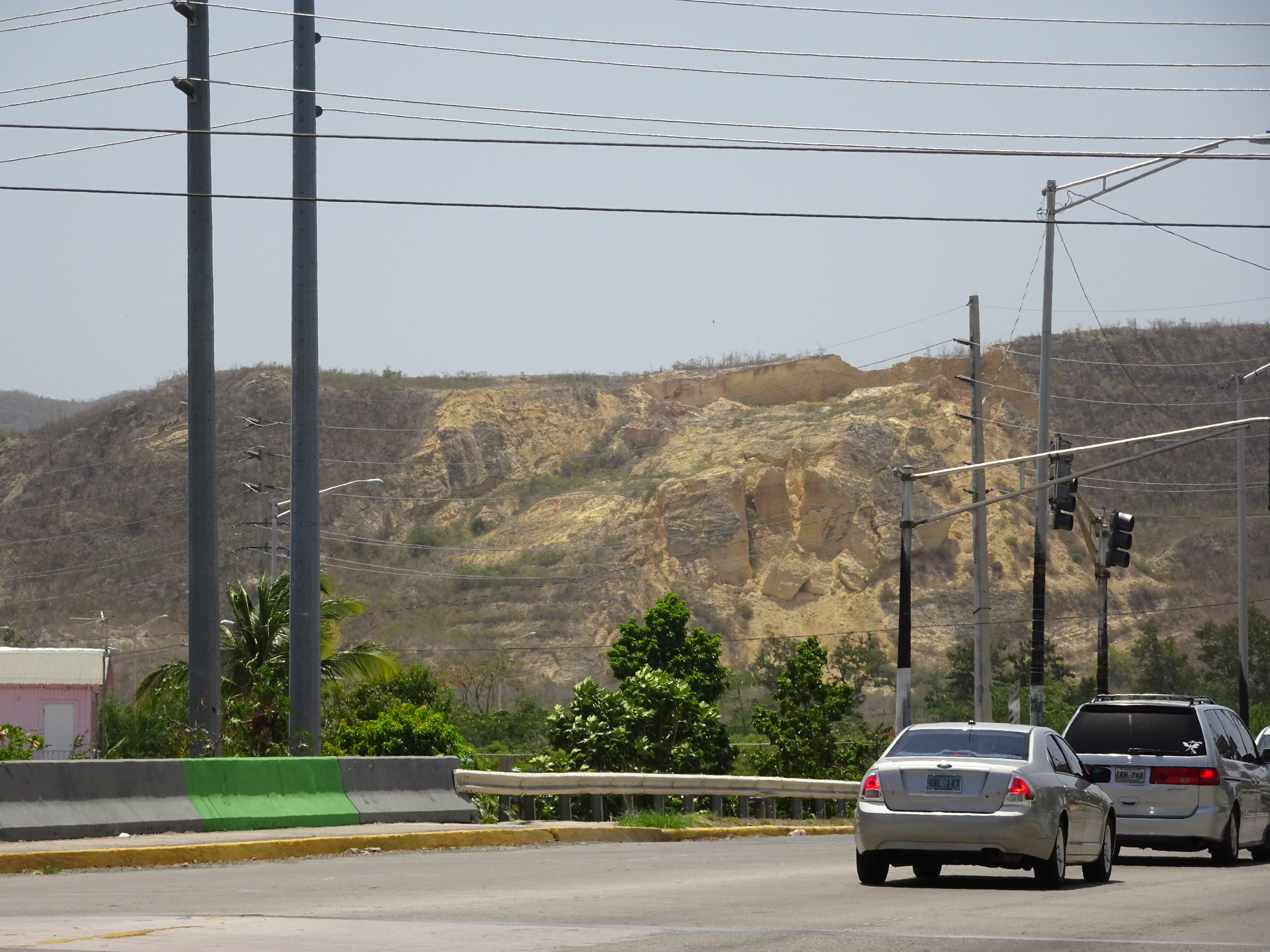
- Ponce Limestone, near Río Pastillo, Bo. Canas, Ponce, Puerto Rico, looking southwest from INT PR-163 and PR-500
- Type: Formation

Lithology
- Primary: Limestone
- Other: Carbonate, Clastic facies, Chalk, Marl, Shale Phosphate

Location
- Coordinates: 18.007°N 66.661°W
- Approximate paleocoordinates: 18.0°N 66.6°W
- Region: Caribbean
- Country: Puerto Rico

Type section
- Named for: Ponce, Puerto Rico
- Named by: Watson H. Monroe
- Ponce Limestone (Puerto Rico)

The Ponce Limestone is a geologic formation in Puerto Rico. It preserves fossils dating back to the Neogene period (20.45 million years ago (Mya).

== Description ==
Ponce Limestone includes beds of brown clay and has a maximum estimated thickness of 850 meters. It consists mostly of yellowish-orange, soft to moderately hard, fossiliferous limestone and appears almost continuously as a narrow band extending from Bahía Montalva in Patillas to Río Pastillo, in Barrio Canas.

== Deposits ==
Exposed in the Ponce, Río Descalabrado, Punta Cucharas, Yauco, Punta Verraco, Guanica, La Parguera, San German, and Cabo Rojo quadrangles of the United States Geological Survey maps.

== Fossil content ==
Various fossils have been found in the Ponce Limestone: molds of gastropods, pelecypods, coral heads, and large foraminifera are indicative of deposition in shallow-water lagoon and back-reef environments. The large foraminifera, Lepidocyclina undosa and the ahermatypic “deep sea” coral Flabellum are reported within the Ponce Limestone.

== See also ==
- List of fossiliferous stratigraphic units in Puerto Rico
- Caliche
