= Artemisa Formation =

Geologic formation in western Cuba

- Stratigraphic range: Late Oxfordian-Tithonian
- Type: Formation
- Sub-units: La Zarza & Sumidero Members

Lithology
- Primary: Shale, limestone

Location
- Coordinates: 22.7°N 83.1°W
- Approximate paleocoordinates: 4.7°N 51.6°W
- Region: Artemisa & Pinar del Río Provinces
- Country: Cuba
- Extent: Sierra del Rosario

Type section
- Named for: Artemisa
- Artemisa Formation (Cuba)

The Artemisa Formation is a geologic formation in western Cuba. It preserves mainly ammonite fossils dating back to the Late Oxfordian to Tithonian period. The formation is divided into two members; La Zarza and Sumidero Members. Most of the formation was deposited in deeper marine conditions.

== See also ==
- List of fossiliferous stratigraphic units in Cuba
