= Lizard Springs Formation =

- Stratigraphic range: Paleocene-Early Eocene
- Type: Formation

Location
- Coordinates: 10.2°N 61.6°W
- Approximate paleocoordinates: 7.6°N 50.4°W
- Country: Trinidad and Tobago
- Lizard Springs Formation (Trinidad and Tobago)

The Lizard Springs Formation is a geologic formation in Trinidad and Tobago. It preserves fossils dating back to the Paleocene to Early Eocene period.

== Fossil content ==
- Alicantina

== See also ==
- List of fossiliferous stratigraphic units in Trinidad and Tobago
