= White Limestone Group =

Geologic group in Jamaica

- Stratigraphic range: Paleogene
- Type: Group

Location
- Country: Jamaica

The White Limestone Group is a geologic group in Jamaica. It preserves fossils dating back to the Paleogene period.

== See also ==
- List of fossiliferous stratigraphic units in Jamaica
