= Yaque Group =

Geology group in the Dominican Republic

- Stratigraphic range: Late Miocene-Early Pliocene
- Type: Group

Lithology
- Primary: Limestone

Location
- Coordinates: 18.5°N 70.7°W
- Approximate paleocoordinates: 18.4°N 69.9°W
- Country: Dominican Republic
- Yaque Group (the Dominican Republic)

The Yaque Group is a geologic group in the southern Dominican Republic. The shallow marine limestone preserves coral fossils dating back to the Late Miocene to Early Pliocene period.

== See also ==
- List of fossiliferous stratigraphic units in the Dominican Republic
