= Lares Limestone =

Geologic formation in Puerto Rico

- Stratigraphic range: Late Oligocene-Early Miocene
- Type: Formation

Lithology
- Primary: Limestone
- Other: Marl, shale phosphate

Location
- Coordinates: 18.4°N 67.0°W
- Approximate paleocoordinates: 17.6°N 66.0°W
- Region: Caribbean
- Country: Puerto Rico

Type section
- Named for: Lares
- Lares Limestone (Puerto Rico)

The Lares Limestone is a geologic formation in Puerto Rico. It preserves fossils dating back to the Late Oligocene to Early Miocene period.

== Fossil content ==
- Callistosiren

== See also ==
- List of fossiliferous stratigraphic units in Puerto Rico
