= Rivière Gauche Formation =

- Stratigraphic range: Pliocene
- Type: Formation
- Overlies: Thomonde Formation

Location
- Coordinates: 19.0°N 72.4°W
- Country: Haiti
- Rivière Gauche Formation (Haiti)

The Rivière Gauche Formation is a geologic formation in Haiti. It preserves fossils dating back to the Pliocene period.

== See also ==
- List of fossiliferous stratigraphic units in Haiti
