= Older Parian Group =

- Stratigraphic range: Aptian
- Type: Group

Lithology
- Primary: Bituminous limestone

Location
- Coordinates: 10.5°N 61.3°W
- Approximate paleocoordinates: 9.3°N 29.4°W
- Country: Trinidad and Tobago
- Older Parian Group (Trinidad and Tobago)

The Older Parian Group is a geologic group in Trinidad and Tobago. The bituminous limestone preserves fossils of Didymotis trinidadensis dating back to the Aptian period.

== See also ==
- List of fossiliferous stratigraphic units in Trinidad and Tobago
