= Peters Hill Limestone =

Geologic formation in Jamaica

- Stratigraphic range: Santonian; ~85 Ma
- Type: Formation
- Underlies: Back River Formation
- Overlies: unconformably on the Arthurs Seat Formation (andesite, basalt and conglomerate)
- Thickness: up to 26 m (85 ft)

Lithology
- Primary: Limestone
- Other: Conglomerate

Location
- Coordinates: 18.1°N 77.2°W
- Approximate paleocoordinates: 16.6°N 63.0°W
- Region: Clarendon Parish
- Country: Jamaica

Type section
- Named for: Peters' Hill
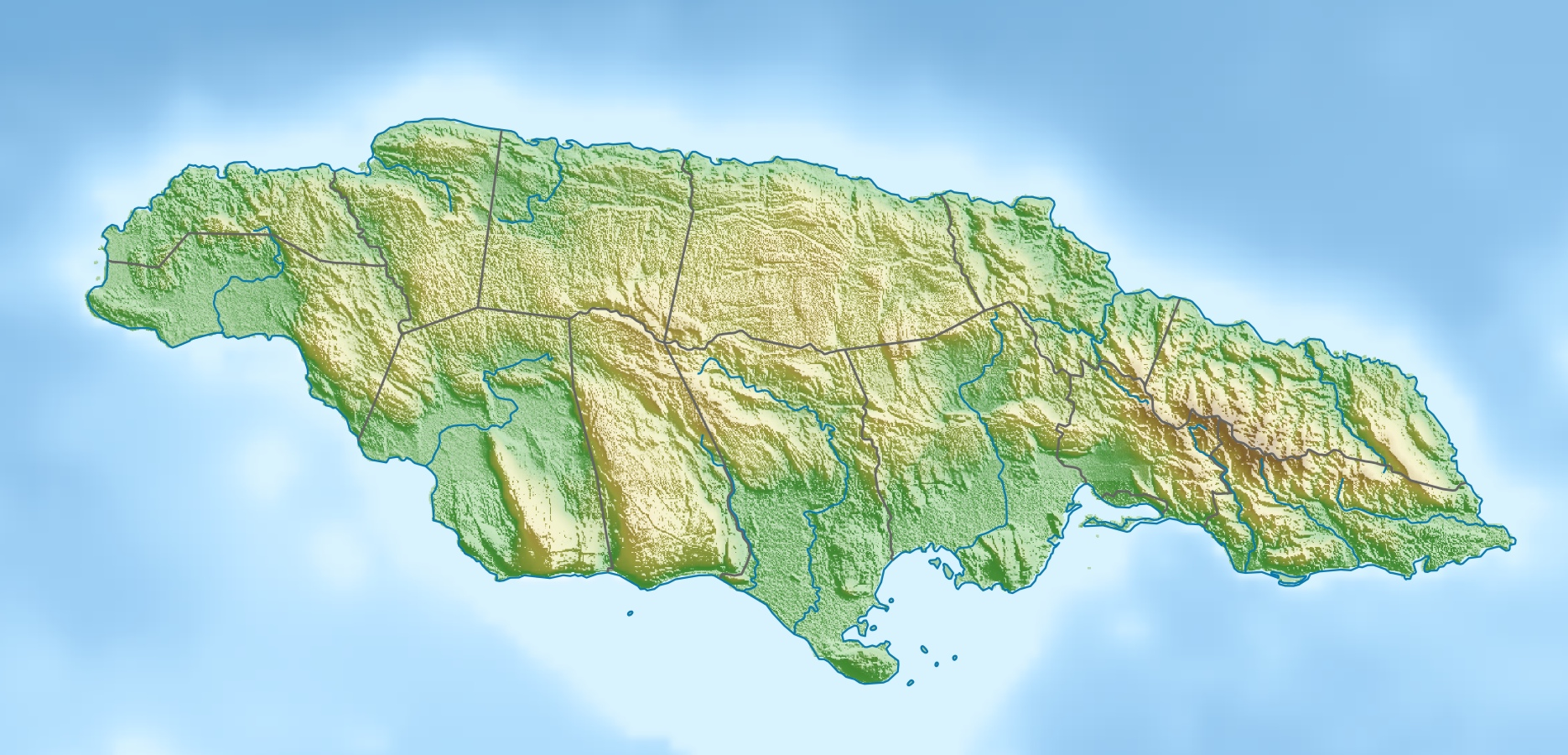
- Peters Hill Limestone (Jamaica)

The Peters Hill Limestone or Peters Hill Formation is a geologic formation in Jamaica. It preserves fossils such as rudists, echinoids and corals from the Santonian stage of the Cretaceous Period.

== See also ==
- List of fossiliferous stratigraphic units in Jamaica
