= Carriacou Formation =

Geologic formation in Grenada

- Stratigraphic range: Early Miocene
- Type: Formation

Lithology
- Primary: Limestone

Location
- Coordinates: 12.5°N 61.5°W
- Approximate paleocoordinates: 12.2°N 60.3°W
- Region: Carriacou
- Country: Grenada

Type section
- Named for: Carriacou
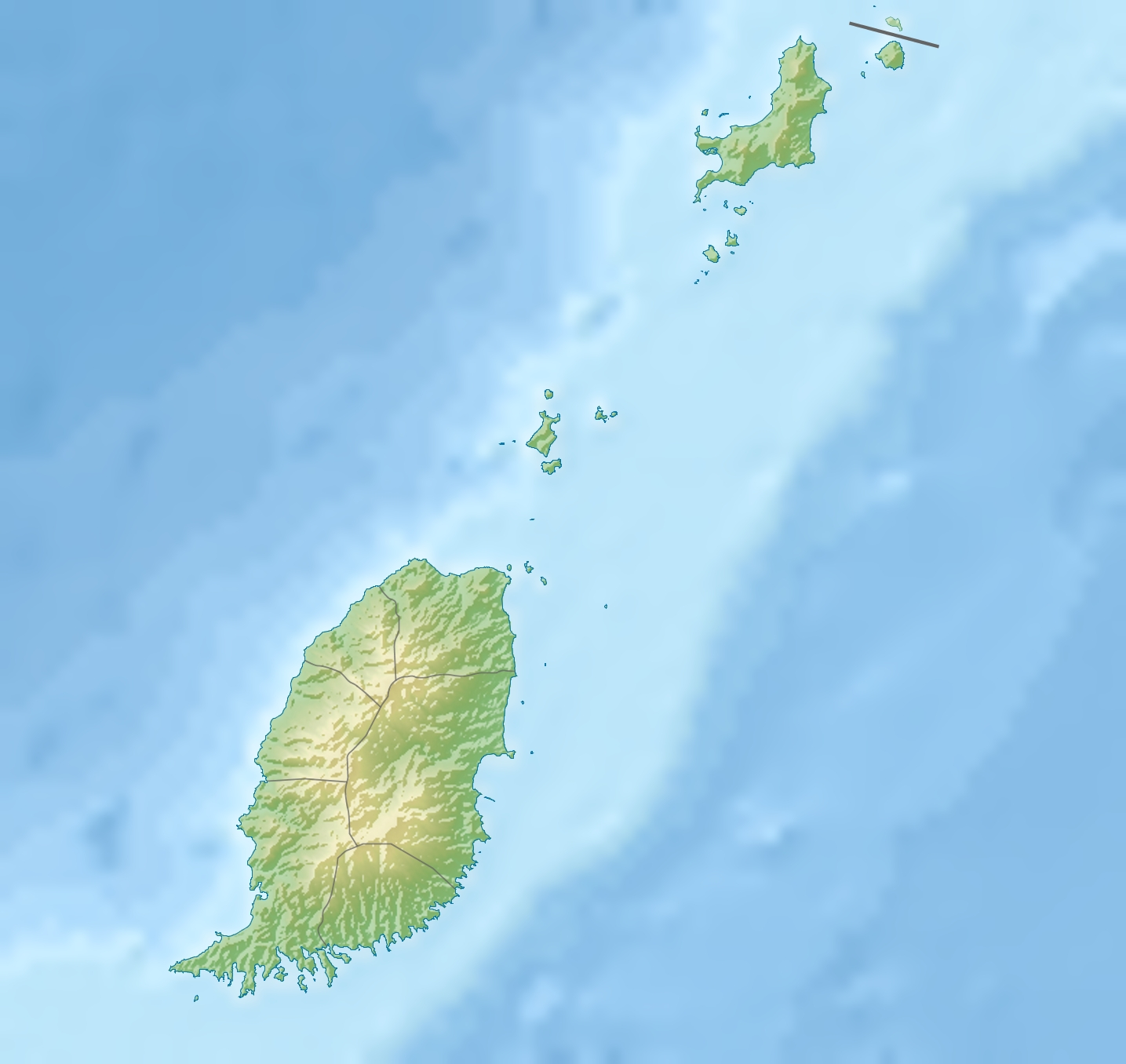
- Carriacou Formation (Grenada)

The Carriacou Formation is a geologic formation in Grenada. It preserves fossils dating back to the Early Miocene period.

== See also ==
- List of fossiliferous stratigraphic units in Grenada
