= Morne l'Enfer Formation =

Geologic formation in Trinidad and Tobago

- Stratigraphic range: Miocene-Early Pliocene
- Type: Formation
- Sub-units: Courbaril Member

Lithology
- Primary: Claystone, sandstone

Location
- Coordinates: 10.2°N 61.6°W
- Approximate paleocoordinates: 10.2°N 60.9°W
- Country: Trinidad and Tobago
- Morne l'Enfer Formation (Trinidad and Tobago)

The Morne l'Enfer Formation is a geologic formation in Trinidad and Tobago. It preserves fossils dating back to the Miocene to Early Pliocene period.

== See also ==
- List of fossiliferous stratigraphic units in Trinidad and Tobago
