= Arimao Formation =

Geologic formation in Cuba

- Stratigraphic range: Santonian; ~85.8–84.9 Ma
- Type: Formation
- Sub-units: Las Moscas Member

Lithology
- Primary: Limestone
- Other: Volcaniclastics

Location
- Coordinates: 22.2°N 80.5°W
- Approximate paleocoordinates: 14.1°N 59.1°W
- Region: Cienfuegos Province
- Country: Cuba
- Extent: Escambray Mountains

Type section
- Named for: Arimao
- Arimao Formation (Cuba)

The Arimao Formation is a geologic formation in Cuba. It preserves mainly ammonite and rudist fossils dating back to the Santonian period.

== See also ==
- List of fossiliferous stratigraphic units in Cuba
