= Saramaguacán Formation =

Geologic formation in Cuba

- Stratigraphic range: Middle Eocene
- Type: Formation

Lithology
- Primary: Siliciclastic

Location
- Coordinates: 21.0°N 77.0°W
- Approximate paleocoordinates: 20.9°N 68.0°W
- Region: Camagüey Province
- Country: Cuba

Type section
- Named for: Saramaguacán River
- Saramaguacán Formation (Cuba)

The Saramaguacán Formation is a geologic formation in Cuba. It preserves mainly plant fossils, dating back to the Middle Eocene period.

== See also ==
- List of fossiliferous stratigraphic units in Cuba
