= Oropouche Formation =

- Stratigraphic range: Early-Late Pleistocene
- Type: Formation

Lithology
- Primary: Lignite

Location
- Coordinates: 10.1°N 61.0°W
- Approximate paleocoordinates: 10.0°N 60.8°W
- Country: Trinidad and Tobago
- Oropouche Formation (Trinidad and Tobago)

The Oropouche Formation is a geologic formation in Trinidad and Tobago dating to the Pleistocene. It preserves plant fossils.

== See also ==
- List of fossiliferous stratigraphic units in Trinidad and Tobago
