= Río Hatillo Formation =

Geologic formation in the Dominican Republic

Rio Hatillo Formation
- Stratigraphic range: Early Albian
- Type: Formation

Lithology
- Primary: Sandstone
- Other: Conglomerate, limestone

Location
- Coordinates: 19.2°N 70.7°W
- Country: Dominican Republic
- Río Hatillo Formation (the Dominican Republic)

The Río Hatillo Formation is a geologic formation in Dominican Republic. It preserves bivalve, echinoid, gastropod and ammonite fossils dating back to the Early Albian period.

== Description ==
Río Hatillo Formation comprises a basal conglomerate, sandstones and calcareous sandstones, covered by a massive biogenic limestone. The formation was probably deposited in a shallow, near-shore environment as part of the Cretaceous Volcanic Arc sections.

== See also ==
- List of fossiliferous stratigraphic units in the Dominican Republic
