= Rio Guatemala Group =

Geologic formation in Puerto Rico

- Stratigraphic range: Paleogene
- Type: Group

Location
- Country: Puerto Rico

The Rio Guatemala Group is a geologic group in Puerto Rico. It preserves fossils dating back to the Paleogene period.

== See also ==
- List of fossiliferous stratigraphic units in Puerto Rico
