= Port Morant Formation =

- Type: Formation

Location
- Country: Jamaica

The Port Morant Formation is a geologic formation in Jamaica. It preserves fossils.

== See also ==
- List of fossiliferous stratigraphic units in Jamaica
