= Lucayan Formation =

Geologic formation in the Bahamas

- Stratigraphic range: Early Pleistocene
- Type: Formation

Lithology
- Primary: Packstone
- Other: Wackestone, grainstone, floatstone

Location
- Coordinates: 24.6°N 79.1°W
- Region: Great Bahama Bank
- Country: Bahamas
- Lucayan Formation (Bahamas)

The Lucayan Formation is a geologic formation in the Bahamas. It preserves fossils dating back to the Early Pleistocene period.

== See also ==
- List of fossiliferous stratigraphic units in the Bahamas
