= Matura Formation =

- Stratigraphic range: Pliocene
- Type: Formation

Location
- Coordinates: 10.7°N 61.1°W
- Approximate paleocoordinates: 10.6°N 60.3°W
- Country: Trinidad and Tobago
- Matura Formation (Trinidad and Tobago)

The Matura Formation is a geologic formation in Trinidad and Tobago. It preserves bivalve and gastropod fossils dating back to the Pliocene period.

== See also ==
- List of fossiliferous stratigraphic units in Trinidad and Tobago
