= Hato Formation =

Geologic formation in Curaçao

- Stratigraphic range: Late Pleistocene; ~0.1–0.01 Ma
- Type: Formation

Lithology
- Primary: Limestone

Location
- Coordinates: 12.3°N 69.1°W
- Country: Curaçao
- Hato Formation (Curaçao)

The Hato Formation is a geologic formation dating to the Late Pleistocene in Curaçao. It preserves fossils.

== See also ==
- List of fossiliferous stratigraphic units in Curaçao
