= Boca de Serpiente Formation =

- Stratigraphic range: Priabonian
- Type: Formation

Lithology
- Primary: Limestone
- Other: Hematite

Location
- Coordinates: 10.2°N 62.0°W
- Approximate paleocoordinates: 8.3°N 55.4°W
- Region: Gulf of Paria
- Country: Trinidad and Tobago

Type section
- Named for: Boca de la Serpiente
- Boca de Serpiente Formation (Trinidad and Tobago)

The Boca de Serpiente Formation is a geologic formation in Trinidad and Tobago. The limestones stained red with hematite, preserve fossils dating back to the Priabonian period.

== See also ==
- List of fossiliferous stratigraphic units in Trinidad and Tobago
