= Mao Adentro Formation =

Geologic formation in the Dominican Republic

- Stratigraphic range: Neogene
- Type: Group

Location
- Country: Dominican Republic

The Mao Adentro Formation is a geologic group in Dominican Republic. It preserves fossils dating back to the Neogene period.

== See also ==
- List of fossiliferous stratigraphic units in Dominican Republic
