= Nivaje Shale =

- Stratigraphic range: Miocene
- Type: Formation

Lithology
- Primary: Shale

Location
- Coordinates: 19.5°N 70.7°W
- Approximate paleocoordinates: 19.4°N 69.6°W
- Country: Dominican Republic
- Nivaje Shale (the Dominican Republic)

The Nivaje Shale is a geologic group in Dominican Republic. It preserves coral fossils dating back to the Miocene period.

== See also ==
- List of fossiliferous stratigraphic units in the Dominican Republic
