= List of fossiliferous stratigraphic units in the Caribbean =

The Paleobiology Database lists no known fossiliferous stratigraphic units in Dominica, Saint Kitts and Nevis, Saint Lucia, Saint Vincent and the Grenadines. The database also records no fossiliferous stratigraphic units within several regions of the Caribbean like the Archipelago of San Andrés, Providencia and Santa Catalina, Guadeloupe, Martinique, Bonaire, Saba, Sint Eustatius, and Nueva Esparta.

== Antigua and Barbuda ==
Fossiliferous stratigraphic units in Antigua and Barbuda
Highlands Formation
Antigua Formation
Central Plain Group

Group	Formation	Period	Notes
	Highlands Formation	Pliocene	
	Antigua Formation	Late Oligocene	
Central Plain Group		Oligocene	

== The Bahamas ==
Fossiliferous stratigraphic units in The Bahamas
Grotto Beach Formation
Lucayan Formation

Group	Formation	Period	Notes
	Grotto Beach Formation	Mid-Late Pleistocene	
	Lucayan Formation	Early Pleistocene	

== Barbados ==
Fossiliferous stratigraphic units in Barbados
Coral Rock Formation
Scotland Beds

Group	Formation	Period	Notes
	Coral Rock Formation	Mid-Late Pleistocene	
	Scotland Beds	Early Eocene	

== Cuba ==
Fossiliferous stratigraphic units in Cuba
Late Pliocene
Canímar Formation
Early-Middle Miocene
Eocene
Habana Formation
Late Cretaceous
Guasasa Formation
Jurassic

Group	Formation	Period	Notes
	La Cruz Formation	Late Pliocene	
	Matanzas Formation	Late Pliocene	
	Canímar Formation	Late Miocene-Pliocene	
	Güines Formation	Early-Mid Miocene	
	Cojímar Formation	Burdigalian-Langhian	
	Bitiri Formation	Early Miocene	
	Lagunitas Formation	Burdigalian	
	Paso Real Formation	Early Miocene	
	Yumurí Formation	Early Miocene	
	Imías Formation	Miocene	
	Consuelo Formation	Priabonian	
	Jabaco Formation	Priabonian	
	Saramaguacán Formation	Middle Eocene	
	Loma Candela Formation	Lutetian-Bartonian	
	Taguasco Formation	Eocene	
	Habana Formation	Early Maastrichtian	
	Habana Formation	Late Campanian	
	Arimao Formation	Santonian	
	Jarao Formation	Santonian	
	Piragua Formation	Santonian	
	Provincial Formation	Cenomanian	
	Guasasa Formation	Early Valanginian	
	Guasasa Formation	Late Tithonian	
	Artemisa Formation	Late Oxfordian-Tithonian	
	Jagua Formation	Mid-Late Oxfordian	
	San Cayetano Formation	Middle Jurassic-Oxfordian	

== Dominican Republic ==
Fossiliferous stratigraphic units in the Dominican Republic
La Isabella Formation
Pliocene
Late Miocene
Burdigalian-Langhian
Miocene
Late Oligocene
Río Hatillo Formation

Group	Formation	Period	Notes
	La Isabella Formation	Pleistocene	
	Mao Formation	Pliocene	
	Mao Adentro Formation	Middle Miocene-Zanclean	
Yaque Group		Late Miocene-Early Pliocene	
	Río Gurabo Formation	Messinian-Zanclean	
	Cercado Formation	Early Miocene-Early Pliocene	
	Cerros de Sal Formation	Late Miocene	
	Baitoa Formation	Burdigalian-Langhian	
	El Mamey Formation	Burdigalian-Langhian	
	La Toca Formation	Burdigalian-Langhian	
	Nivaje Shale	Miocene	
	Yanigua Formation	Miocene	
Tabera Group	Tabera Formation	Late Oligocene	
	Cervicos Limestone	Late Oligocene	
	Río Hatillo Formation	Early Albian	

== Grenada ==
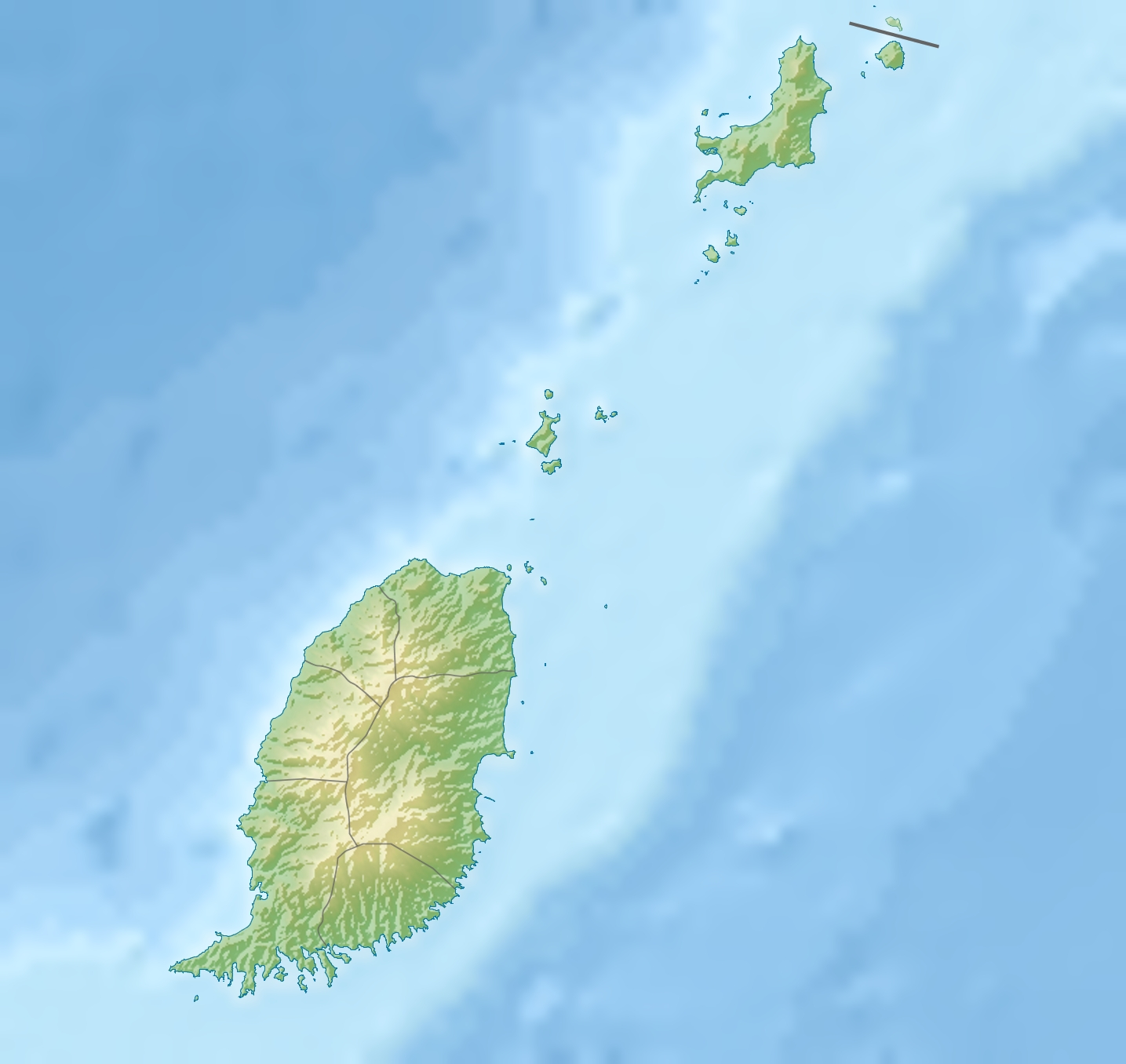
Fossiliferous stratigraphic units in Grenada
Belmont, Grand Bay and Kendance Formations
Carriacou Formation

Group	Formation	Period	Notes
	Grand Bay Formation	Middle Miocene	
	Kendance Formation	Early-Mid Miocene	
	Carriacou Formation	Early Miocene	
	Belmont Formation	Early Miocene	

== Haiti ==
Fossiliferous stratigraphic units in Haiti
Rivière Gauche Formation
Las Cahobas Formation
Thomonde Formation
Maissade Formation
Plaisance Formation

Group	Formation	Period	Notes
	Rivière Gauche Formation	Pliocene	
Artibonite Group	Las Cahobas Formation	Mid-Late Miocene	
	Thomonde Formation	Early-Mid Miocene	
	Maissade Formation	Early Oligocene	
	Plaisance Formation	Middle Eocene	

== Jamaica ==
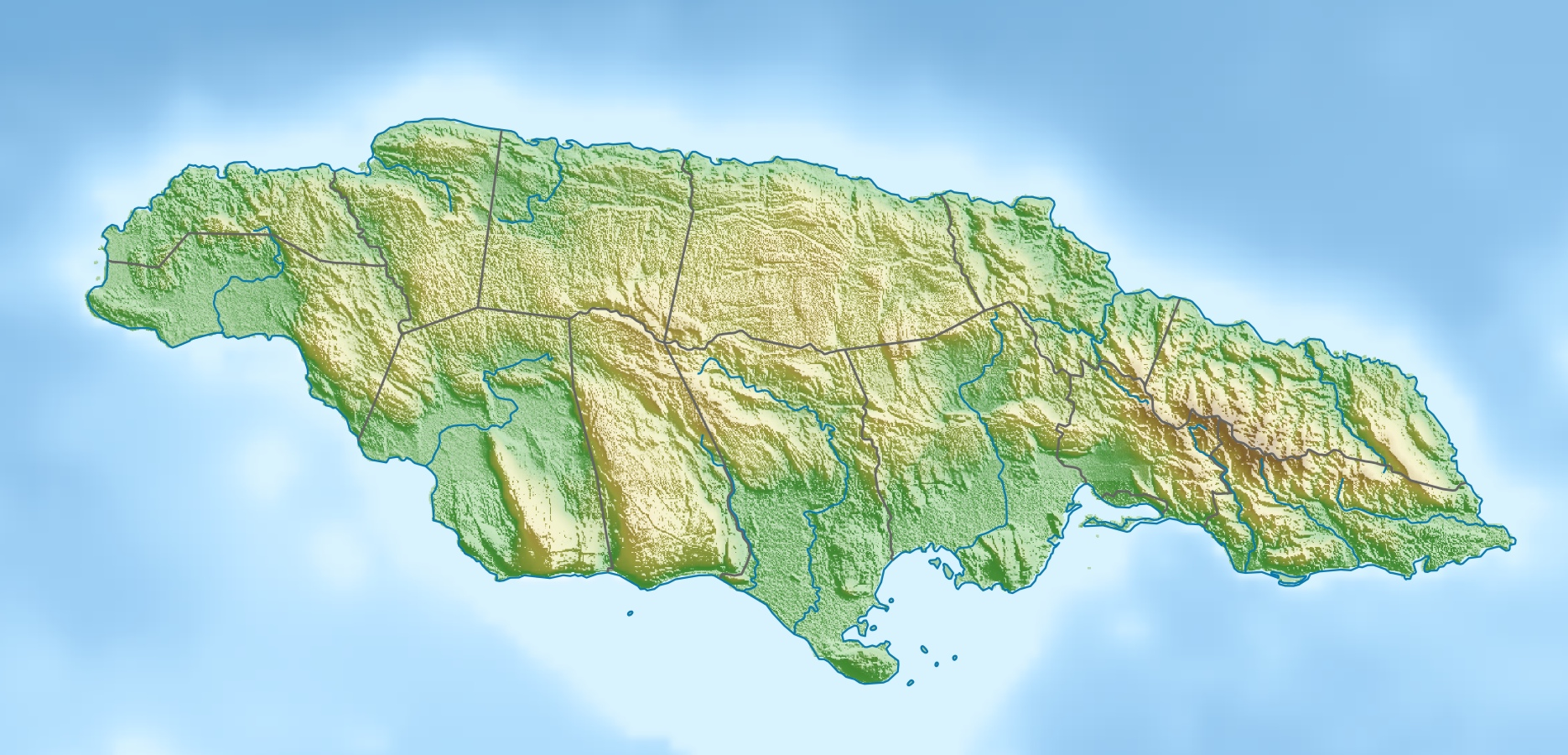
Fossiliferous stratigraphic units in Jamaica
Coastal Group
Pliocene
White Limestone Group
Yellow Limestone Group
Richmond Formation
Campanian-Maastrichtian
Santonian
Devils Racecourse Formation

Group	Formation	Period	Notes
Coastal Group	Port Morant Formation	Late Pleistocene	
Coastal Group	Falmouth Formation	Late Pleistocene	
Coastal Group	Manchioneal Formation	Gelasian-Calabrian	
Coastal Group	Bowden Formation	Pliocene	
	Hope Gate Formation	Pliocene-Pleistocene	
	Old Pera Formation	Pliocene-Pleistocene	
	August Town Formation	Late Miocene-Late Pliocene	
White Limestone Group	Sign Formation	Early Miocene	
White Limestone Group	Moneague Formation	Early Oligocene-Early Miocene	
White Limestone Group	Troy Limestone	Late Eocene	
White Limestone Group	Swanswick Formation	Bartonian-Late Eocene	
White Limestone Group	Gibraltar Limestone	Bartonian	
Yellow Limestone Group	Somerset Formation	Late Eocene	
Yellow Limestone Group	Cambridge Formation	Lutetian	
Yellow Limestone Group	Chapelton Formation	Ypresian-Lutetian	
	Los Hidalgos Formation	Late Eocene	
	Richmond Formation	Early-Mid Eocene	
	Maldon Limestone	Late Maastrichtian	
	Cross Pass Formation	Maastrichtian	
	Jerusalem Mountain Formation	Maastrichtian	
	Providence Shales	Maastrichtian	
	Titanosarcolites Limestone	Maastrichtian	
	Veniella Shale	Maastrichtian	
	Woodland Shale	Early Maastrichtian	
	Slippery Rock Formation	Late Campanian-Early Maastrichtian	
	Stapleton Limestone	Late Campanian-Maastrichtian	
	Catadupa Beds	Campanian-Maastrichtian	
	Rio Grande Formation	Campanian-Maastrichtian	
	Guinea Corn Formation	Late Campanian-Late Maastrichtian	
	Barrettia Limestone	Late Campanian	
Blue Mountain Series Group		Campanian	
	Harvey River Formation	Late Santonian	
	Inoceramus Shales	Late Santonian	
	Mount Peace Formation	Late Santonian	
	Peters Hill Limestone	Santonian	
	Devils Racecourse Formation	Hauterivian	

== Trinidad and Tobago ==
Fossiliferous stratigraphic units in Trinidad and Tobago
Oropouche Formation
Pliocene
Miocene
Paleogene-Miocene
Paleogene
San Fernando Formation
Tobago Volcanic Group
Older Parian Group

Group	Formation	Period	Notes
	Oropouche Formation	Early-Late Pleistocene	
	Matura Formation	Pliocene	
	Talparo Formation	Early Pliocene	
	Morne l'Enfer Formation	Miocene-Early Pliocene	
	Springvale Formation	Late Miocene	
	Manzanilla Formation	Middle Miocene	
	Moruga Formation	Middle Miocene	
	Tamana Formation	Burdigalian-Serravallian	
	Brasso Formation	Early Eocene-Serravallian	
	Cipero Marl	Early Oligocene-Burdigalian	
	Morne Diablo Limestone	Oligocene	
	Boca de Serpiente Formation	Priabonian	
	Soldado Formation	Thanetian-Bartonian	
	Lizard Springs Formation	Paleocene-Early Eocene	
	Nariva Formation	Paleocene	
	San Fernando Formation	Oligocene	
	San Fernando Formation	Early Turonian	
Tobago Volcanic	Bacolet Formation	Albian	
Older Parian		Aptian	

== Dependencies of France ==
The Paleobiology Database lists no known fossiliferous stratigraphic units in the French dependencies of St. Barthélemy or St. Martin.

== Dependencies of the Netherlands ==
The Paleobiology Database lists no known fossiliferous stratigraphic units in the Dutch dependencies of Aruba, Bonaire, Saba, Sint Eustatius and Sint Maarten.

=== Curaçao ===
Fossiliferous stratigraphic units in Curaçao
Hato Formation
Ceru di Cueba and Ceru Mainsjie Formations

Group	Formation	Period	Notes
	Hato Formation	Late Pleistocene	
	Ceru di Cueba Formation	Bartonian	
	Ceru Mainsjie Formation	Bartonian	

== Dependencies of the United Kingdom ==
The Paleobiology Database lists no known fossiliferous stratigraphic units in the British dependencies of the British Virgin Islands, the Cayman Islands, Montserrat, or the Turks and Caicos Islands.

=== Anguilla ===
Fossiliferous stratigraphic units in Anguilla
Anguilla Formation

Group	Formation	Period	Notes
	Anguilla Formation	Burdigalian-Serravallian	

=== Bermuda ===
Fossiliferous stratigraphic units in Bermuda
Devonshire Formation
Rocky Bay Formation
Belmont Formation
Spencer's Point Formation

Group	Formation	Period	Notes
	Devonshire Formation	Late Pleistocene	
	Rocky Bay Formation	Late Pleistocene	
	Belmont Formation	Middle Pleistocene	
	Spencer's Point Formation	Middle Pleistocene	

== Dependencies of the United States ==
The Paleobiology Database lists no known fossiliferous stratigraphic units in the American dependencies of Navassa Island or the United States Virgin Islands.

=== Puerto Rico ===
Fossiliferous stratigraphic units in Puerto Rico
Ponce Limestone
Miocene
Lares Limestone
Oligocene
Coamo Formation
Campanian-Maastrichtian
Barranquitas-Cayey Formation

Group	Formation	Period	Notes
	Ponce Limestone	Early Miocene-Early Pliocene	
	Aymamón Limestone	Mid-Late Miocene	
	Aguada Limestone	Early-Late Miocene	
	Quebradillas Limestone	Middle Miocene	
	Cibao Formation	Aquitanian-Burdigalian	
	Lares Limestone	Late Oligocene-Early Miocene	
	Guayanilla Formation	Late Oligocene	
Guatemala Group	Cibao Marl	Late Oligocene	
Guatemala Group		Oligocene	
Río Guatemala Group	San Sebastián Limestone	Early-Late Oligocene	
	Collazo Shale	Early Oligocene	
	Pepino Formation	Chattian	
	Coamo Formation	Danian	
	Coamo Formation	Maastrichtian	
	Melones Formation	Early Maastrichtian	
	El Rayo Formation	Late Campanian-Early Maastrichtian	
	Pozas Formation	Early Campanian-Early Maastrichtian	
	Cotui Limestone	Late Campanian	
	Sabana Grande Formation	Late Campanian	
	Maravillas Formation	Campanian	
	Barranquitas-Cayey Formation	Coniacian	

== See also ==
- Lists of fossiliferous stratigraphic units in the United States
  - List of fossiliferous stratigraphic units in Florida
  - List of fossiliferous stratigraphic units in Alabama
  - List of fossiliferous stratigraphic units in Mississippi
  - List of fossiliferous stratigraphic units in Louisiana
  - List of fossiliferous stratigraphic units in Texas
- List of fossiliferous stratigraphic units in Mexico
- List of fossiliferous stratigraphic units in Central America
- List of fossiliferous stratigraphic units in Colombia
- List of fossiliferous stratigraphic units in Guyana
- List of fossiliferous stratigraphic units in Venezuela
