= Cercado Formation =

- Stratigraphic range: Late Miocene-Early Pliocene
- Type: Group
- Overlies: Baitoa Formation

Lithology
- Primary: Siltstone, limestone, claystone
- Other: Sandstone, conglomerate

Location
- Coordinates: 19.5°N 71.3°W
- Approximate paleocoordinates: 19.3°N 70.7°W
- Country: Dominican Republic
- Cercado Formation (the Dominican Republic)

The Cercado Formation is a geologic group in Dominican Republic. The formation comprises siltstones, limestones, claystones, sandstones and conglomerates deposited in a shallow marine to reef environment. The Cercado Formation, unconformably overlying the Baitoa Formation, preserves bivalve, gastropod, decapod and coral fossils dating back to the Late Miocene to Early Pliocene period.

== See also ==
- List of fossiliferous stratigraphic units in the Dominican Republic
