= Tobago Volcanic Group =

Geologic group in Trinidad and Tobago

- Stratigraphic range: Albian
- Type: Group
- Sub-units: Bacolet Formation

Lithology
- Primary: Volcaniclastics
- Other: Shale, sandstone, siltstone

Location
- Coordinates: 11.2°N 60.8°W
- Approximate paleocoordinates: 5.6°N 32.6°W
- Region: Tobago
- Country: Trinidad and Tobago

Type section
- Named for: Tobago
- Tobago Volcanic Group (Trinidad and Tobago)

The Tobago Volcanic Group is a geologic group in Trinidad and Tobago. It preserves radiolaria and ammonite fossils dating back to the Albian period. The formation contains the Bacolet Formation and comprises organic-rich, black pyritic siliceous mudstones and fine-grained volcaniclastic sandstones and siltstones.

== See also ==
- List of fossiliferous stratigraphic units in Trinidad and Tobago
