= Harvey River Formation =

Geologic formation in Jamaica

- Stratigraphic range: Late Santonian; ~85 Ma
- Type: Formation

Lithology
- Primary: Sandstone
- Other: Shale

Location
- Coordinates: 18.4°N 78.1°W
- Approximate paleocoordinates: 17.0°N 63.9°W
- Region: Hanover Parish
- Country: Jamaica

Type section
- Named for: Harvey River
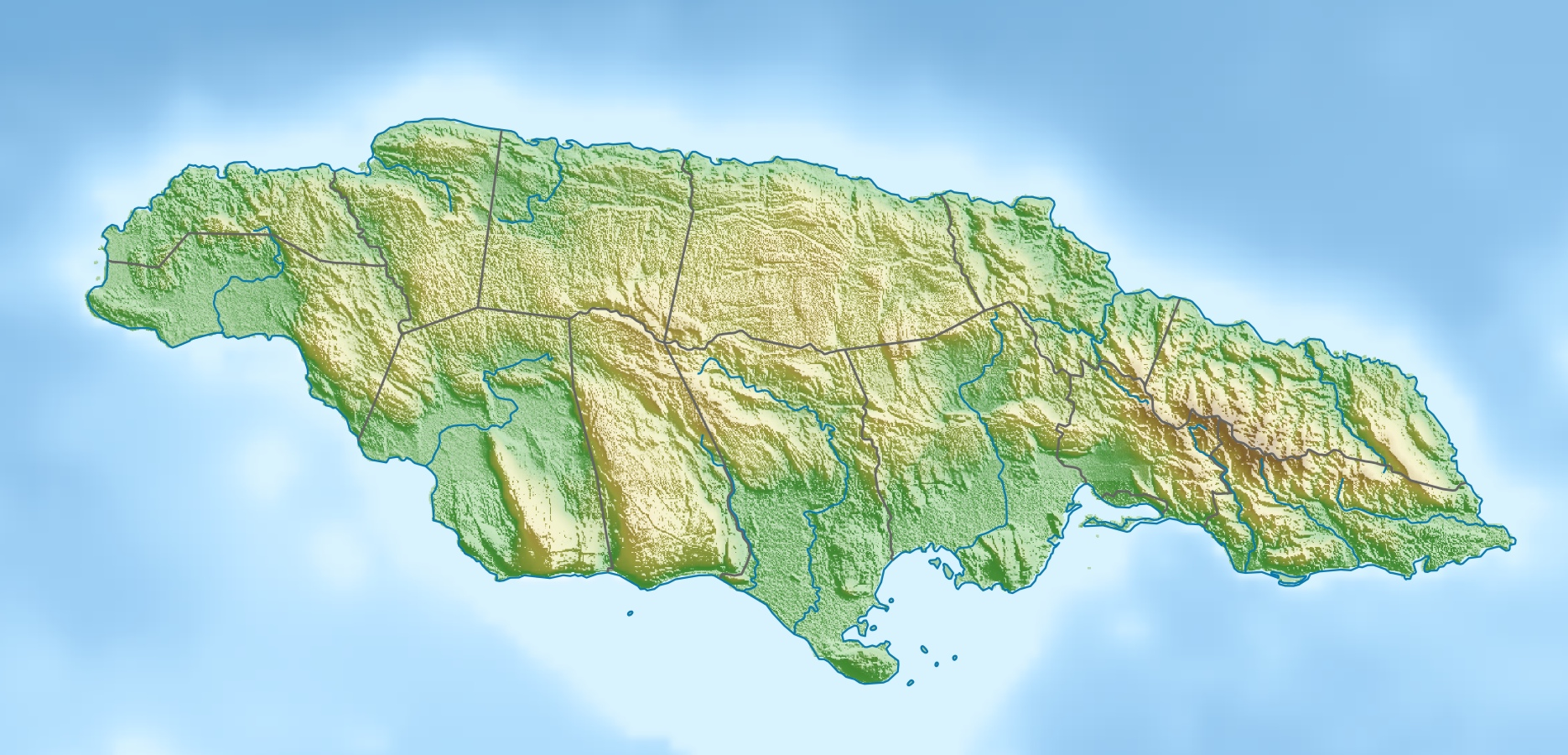
- Harvey River Formation (Jamaica)

The Harvey River Formation is a geologic formation in Jamaica. It preserves bivalve fossils dating back to the Cretaceous period.

== See also ==
- List of fossiliferous stratigraphic units in Jamaica
