= Manchioneal Formation =

- Type: Formation
- Unit of: Coastal Group
- Overlies: white limestone of Jamaica. Type locality is in Port Maria and Port Antonio

Location
- Country: Jamaica

The Manchioneal Formation is a geologic formation in Jamaica. It preserves fossils. If can be found outcropping at the Titchfield High School along the bay head in Port Antonio. The fossils present in the formation are modern, massive corals which have been extensively case hardened by re-precipitation of calcite.

== See also ==
- List of fossiliferous stratigraphic units in Jamaica
