= Talparo Formation =

- Stratigraphic range: Early Pliocene
- Type: Formation
- Sub-units: Caparo Clay

Location
- Coordinates: 10.6°N 61.3°W
- Approximate paleocoordinates: 10.6°N 60.5°W
- Country: Trinidad and Tobago
- Talparo Formation (Trinidad and Tobago)

The Talparo Formation is a geologic formation in Trinidad and Tobago. It preserves fossils dating back to the Early Pliocene period.

== See also ==
- List of fossiliferous stratigraphic units in Trinidad and Tobago
