= Imías Formation =

Cuban geologic formation

- Stratigraphic range: Miocene
- Type: Formation

Lithology
- Primary: Marl, limestone
- Other: Gypsum

Location
- Coordinates: 20.0°N 74.8°W
- Approximate paleocoordinates: 20.2°N 72.1°W
- Region: Guantánamo Province
- Country: Cuba

Type section
- Named for: Imías
- Imías Formation (Cuba)

The Imías Formation is a geologic formation in Cuba. It preserves fossils dating back to the Miocene period.

== Fossil content ==
- Decapoda indet.

== See also ==
- List of fossiliferous stratigraphic units in Cuba
