= Blue Mountain Series =

Geologic formation in Jamaica

- Stratigraphic range: Cretaceous
- Type: Formation

Location
- Country: Jamaica

The Blue Mountain Series is a geologic formation in Jamaica. It preserves fossils that date back to the Cretaceous period.

== See also ==
- List of fossiliferous stratigraphic units in Jamaica
