= Provincial Formation =

Geologic formation in Cuba

- Stratigraphic range: Cenomanian; ~100–94 Ma
- Type: Formation
- Sub-units: Tepeyacia Beds

Lithology
- Primary: Limestone

Location
- Coordinates: 22.0°N 80.0°W
- Approximate paleocoordinates: 5.8°N 58.6°W
- Region: Cienfuegos Province
- Country: Cuba
- Provincial Formation (Cuba)

The Provincial Formation is a geologic formation in Cuba. It preserves rudist fossils dating back to the Cenomanian period.

== Fossil content ==
- Caprinuloidea perfecta
- Coalcomana ramosa
- Tepeyacia corrugata
- Icthyosarcolites sp.
- Sabinia sp.

== See also ==
- List of fossiliferous stratigraphic units in Cuba
