= Matanzas Formation =

Geologic formation in Cuba

- Stratigraphic range: Late Pliocene
- Type: Formation

Lithology
- Primary: Marl

Location
- Coordinates: 23.1°N 81.6°W
- Approximate paleocoordinates: 23.1°N 81.0°W
- Region: Matanzas Province
- Country: Cuba

Type section
- Named for: Matanzas
- Matanzas Formation (Cuba)

The Matanzas Formation is a geologic formation in Cuba. It preserves fossils dating back to the Late Pliocene period.

== Fossil content ==
- Porites baracoaensis
- Agaricia dominicensis
- Madracis mirabilis
- Stylophora granulata
- Thysanus excentricus

== See also ==
- List of fossiliferous stratigraphic units in Cuba
