= Cibao Marl =

Geologic formation in Puerto Rico

- Stratigraphic range: Neogene
- Type: Geologic formation

Lithology
- Primary: Limestone

Location
- Region: Caribbean
- Country: Puerto Rico

The Cibao Marl is a geologic formation in Puerto Rico.

It preserves fossils dating back to the Neogene period.

== See also ==
- List of fossiliferous stratigraphic units in Puerto Rico
