= Thomonde Formation =

Geologic formation in Haiti

- Stratigraphic range: Early-Mid Miocene
- Type: Formation
- Underlies: Rivière Gauche Formation

Location
- Coordinates: 18.7°N 71.8°W
- Approximate paleocoordinates: 18.5°N 70.5°W
- Country: Haiti
- Thomonde Formation (Haiti)

The Thomonde Formation is a geologic formation in Haiti. It preserves fossils dating back to the Early to Middle Miocene period.

== See also ==
- List of fossiliferous stratigraphic units in Haiti
