= Devils Racecourse Formation =

Geologic formation in Jamaica

- Stratigraphic range: Hauterivian; ~136–130 Ma
- Type: Formation
- Sub-units: Copper Limestone Member

Lithology
- Primary: Limestone

Location
- Coordinates: 18.2°N 77.0°W
- Region: Saint Catherine Parish
- Country: Jamaica
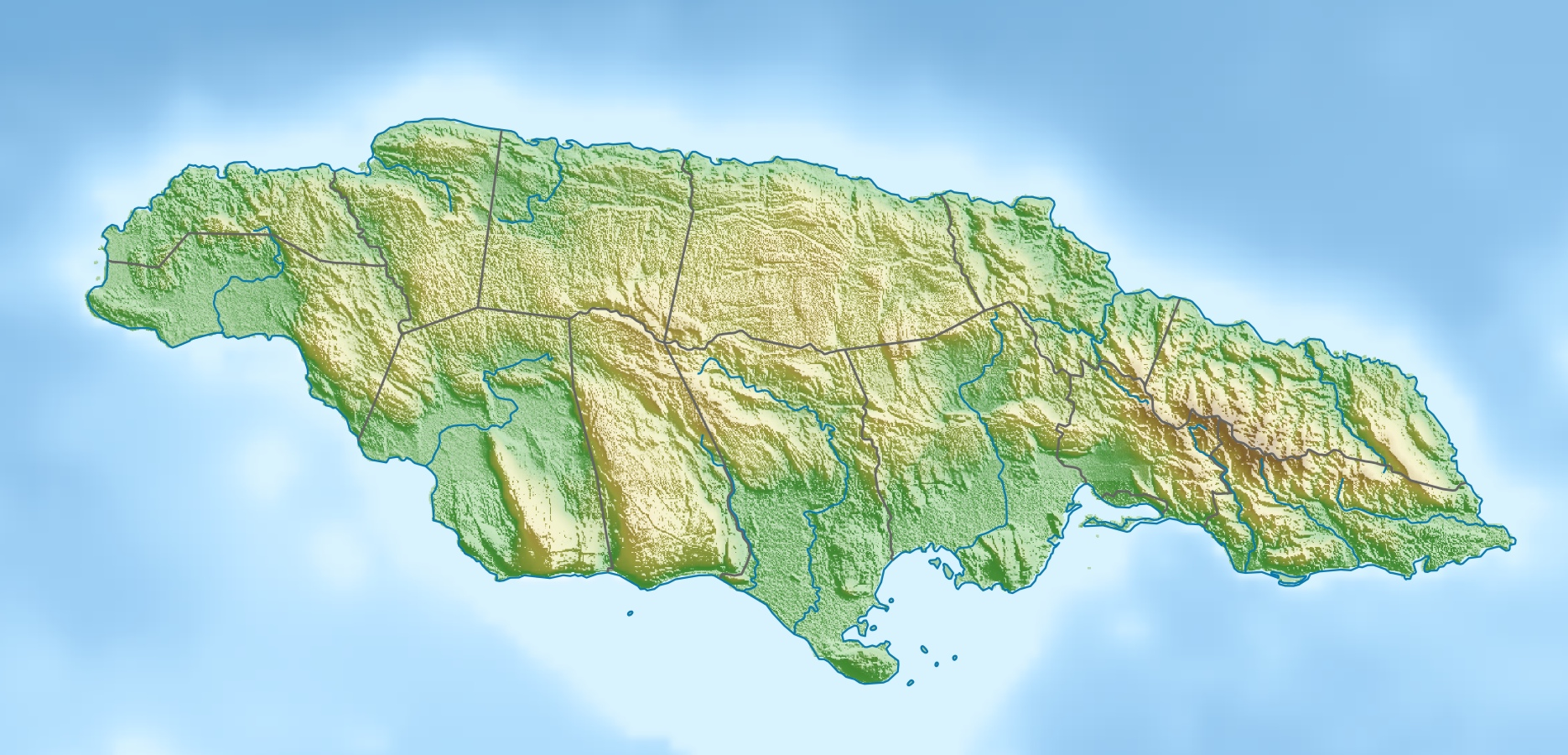
- Devils Racecourse Formation (Jamaica)

The Devils Racecourse Formation is a geologic formation in Jamaica. The limestones of the formation preserve rudist, bivalve, coral, foraminifera and algae fossils dating back to the Hauterivian stage of the Cretaceous period.

== See also ==
- List of fossiliferous stratigraphic units in Jamaica
