= Jarao Formation =

Geologic formation in Cuba

- Stratigraphic range: Santonian; ~85.8–84.9 Ma
- Type: Formation

Lithology
- Primary: Limestone
- Other: Tuff

Location
- Coordinates: 22.1°N 79.7°W
- Approximate paleocoordinates: 13.8°N 58.5°W
- Region: Sancti Spíritus Province
- Country: Cuba

Type section
- Named for: El Jarao
- Jarao Formation (Cuba)

The Jarao Formation is a geologic formation in Cuba. The dark-colored limestone intercalated with volcanic and tuffaceous formation preserves rudist fossils of Vaccinites inaequicostatus and dates back to the Santonian period.

== See also ==
- List of fossiliferous stratigraphic units in Cuba
