= Falmouth Formation =

Geologic formation in Jamaica

- Type: Formation

Location
- Country: Jamaica

The Falmouth Formation is a geologic formation in Jamaica. It preserves fossils.

== See also ==
- List of fossiliferous stratigraphic units in Jamaica
