= Tabera Formation =

Geologic formation in the Dominican Republic

- Stratigraphic range: Late Oligocene
- Type: Formation
- Unit of: Tabera Group
- Underlies: Baitoa Formation

Lithology
- Primary: Limestone

Location
- Coordinates: 19.3°N 70.7°W
- Approximate paleocoordinates: 18.5°N 69.7°W
- Country: Dominican Republic
- Tabera Formation (the Dominican Republic)

The Tabera Formation is a geologic formation in the Dominican Republic. The shallow marine limestone preserves gastropod and coral fossils dating back to the Late Oligocene period.

== See also ==
- List of fossiliferous stratigraphic units in the Dominican Republic
