= Jabaco Formation =

Geologic formation in Cuba

- Stratigraphic range: Priabonian
- Type: Formation
- Sub-units: Jicotea Member

Lithology
- Primary: Marl, sandstone
- Other: Limestone

Location
- Coordinates: 22.3°N 79.7°W
- Approximate paleocoordinates: 22.3°N 72.6°W
- Region: Pinar del Río Province
- Country: Cuba

Type section
- Named for: Jabaco
- Jabaco Formation (Cuba)

The Jabaco Formation is a geologic formation in Cuba. It preserves fossils dating back to the Paleogene period.

== Description ==
The Jabaco Formation consists of yellowish calcareous marls with abundant calcareous sandstone, in places compacted into marly limestone. The Jicotea Member is correlated with the Avon Park Formation of Florida.

== Fossil content ==
- Tylocidaris bermudez
- Prionocidaris loveni
- Palmerius roberti
- Prophyllacanthus eocenicus

== See also ==
- List of fossiliferous stratigraphic units in Cuba
