= Ceru di Cueba Formation =

Geologic formation in Curaçao

- Stratigraphic range: Bartonian
- Type: Formation

Lithology
- Primary: Limestone
- Other: Claystone

Location
- Coordinates: 12.1°N 68.8°W
- Approximate paleocoordinates: 10.8°N 68.7°W
- Region: Caribbean
- Country: Curaçao
- Ceru di Cueba Formation (Curaçao)

The Ceru di Cueba Formation is a geologic formation in Curaçao. It preserves fossils dating back to the Bartonian period.

== See also ==
- List of fossiliferous stratigraphic units in Curaçao
