= Bacolet Formation =

Geologic formation in Trinidad and Tobago

- Stratigraphic range: Albian
- Type: Formation
- Unit of: Tobago Volcanic Group

Lithology
- Primary: Mudstone
- Other: Volcaniclastic sandstone & siltstone

Location
- Coordinates: 11.2°N 60.8°W
- Approximate paleocoordinates: 5.6°N 32.6°W
- Region: Tobago
- Country: Trinidad and Tobago

Type section
- Named for: Bacolet
- Bacolet Formation (Trinidad and Tobago)

The Bacolet Formation is a geologic formation in Trinidad and Tobago. It preserves radiolaria and ammonite fossils dating back to the Albian period. The formation is part of the Tobago Volcanic Group and comprises organic-rich, black pyritic siliceous mudstones and fine-grained volcaniclastic sandstones and siltstones.

== See also ==
- List of fossiliferous stratigraphic units in Trinidad and Tobago
