= Las Cahobas Formation =

Geologic formation in Haiti

- Stratigraphic range: Mid-Late Miocene
- Type: Formation
- Unit of: Artibonite Group

Location
- Coordinates: 19.0°N 72.4°W
- Approximate paleocoordinates: 18.9°N 71.3°W
- Country: Haiti
- Las Cahobas Formation (Haiti)

The Las Cahobas Formation is a geologic formation in Haiti. It preserves fossils dating back to the Middle to Late Miocene period.

== See also ==
- List of fossiliferous stratigraphic units in Haiti
