= Soldado Formation =

- Stratigraphic range: Thanetian-Bartonian
- Type: Formation

Lithology
- Primary: Limestone

Location
- Coordinates: 10.3°N 61.5°W
- Approximate paleocoordinates: 7.4°N 48.7°W
- Country: Trinidad and Tobago
- Soldado Formation (Trinidad and Tobago)

The Soldado Formation is a geologic formation in Trinidad and Tobago. It preserves fossils dating back to the Thanetian to Bartonian period.

== Fossil content ==
- Cimomia kugleri, C. subrecta
- Hercoglossa harrisi

== See also ==
- List of fossiliferous stratigraphic units in Trinidad and Tobago
