= Loma Candela Formation =

Geologic formation in Cuba

- Stratigraphic range: Lutetian
- Type: Formation

Lithology
- Primary: Limestone, marl
- Other: Conglomerate, sandstone

Location
- Coordinates: 22.1°N 80.5°W
- Approximate paleocoordinates: 22.3°N 71.4°W
- Country: Cuba
- Loma Candela Formation (Cuba)

The Loma Candela Formation is a geologic formation in Cuba. It preserves fossils dating back to the Paleogene period.

== Description ==
The formation consists of limestones, yellowish calcareous marls and coastal conglomerates and fine calcareous sandstones. The Loma Candela Formation was deposited in a marine environment. It overlies the Universidad Formation and is correlated with the Tallahassee and Lake City Formations of Florida.

== Fossil content ==
- Histocidaris sanchezi
- Prionocidaris loveni
- Tylocidaris bermudezi

== See also ==
- List of fossiliferous stratigraphic units in Cuba
