= Rocky Bay Formation =

Geological formation in Bermuda

- Type: Formation

Location
- Country: Bermuda

The Rocky Bay Formation is a geologic formation in Bermuda. It preserves fossils.

== See also ==
- List of fossiliferous stratigraphic units in Bermuda
