= Pepino Formation, Puerto Rico =

Geologic formation in Puerto Rico

Pepino Formation
- Stratigraphic range: Paleogene
- Type: Formation

Location
- Region: Caribbean
- Country: Puerto Rico

The Pepino Formation is a geologic formation in Puerto Rico. It preserves fossils dating back to the Paleogene period. It is located 4 miles west of the municipality of Lares.

== See also ==
- List of fossiliferous stratigraphic units in Puerto Rico
