= Scotland Beds =

Geologic formation in Barbados

- Stratigraphic range: Early Eocene
- Type: Formation

Lithology
- Primary: Conglomerate

Location
- Coordinates: 13.2°N 59.5°W
- Approximate paleocoordinates: 11.1°N 59.1°W
- Region: Bissex Hill
- Country: Barbados
- Scotland Beds (Barbados)

The Scotland Beds is a geologic formation in Barbados. It preserves fossils of Falconoplax bicarinella and Palaeopinnixa perornata, dating back to the Early Eocene period.

== See also ==
- Geography of Barbados
- List of fossiliferous stratigraphic units in Barbados
