= Artibonite Group =

- Stratigraphic range: Mid-Late Miocene
- Type: Group
- Sub-units: Las Cahobas Formation

Location
- Coordinates: 19.0°N 72.4°W
- Approximate paleocoordinates: 18.9°N 71.3°W
- Country: Haiti
- Artibonite Group (Haiti)

The Artibonite Group is a geologic group in Haiti. It preserves fossils dating back to the Middle to Late Miocene period.

== See also ==
- List of fossiliferous stratigraphic units in Haiti
