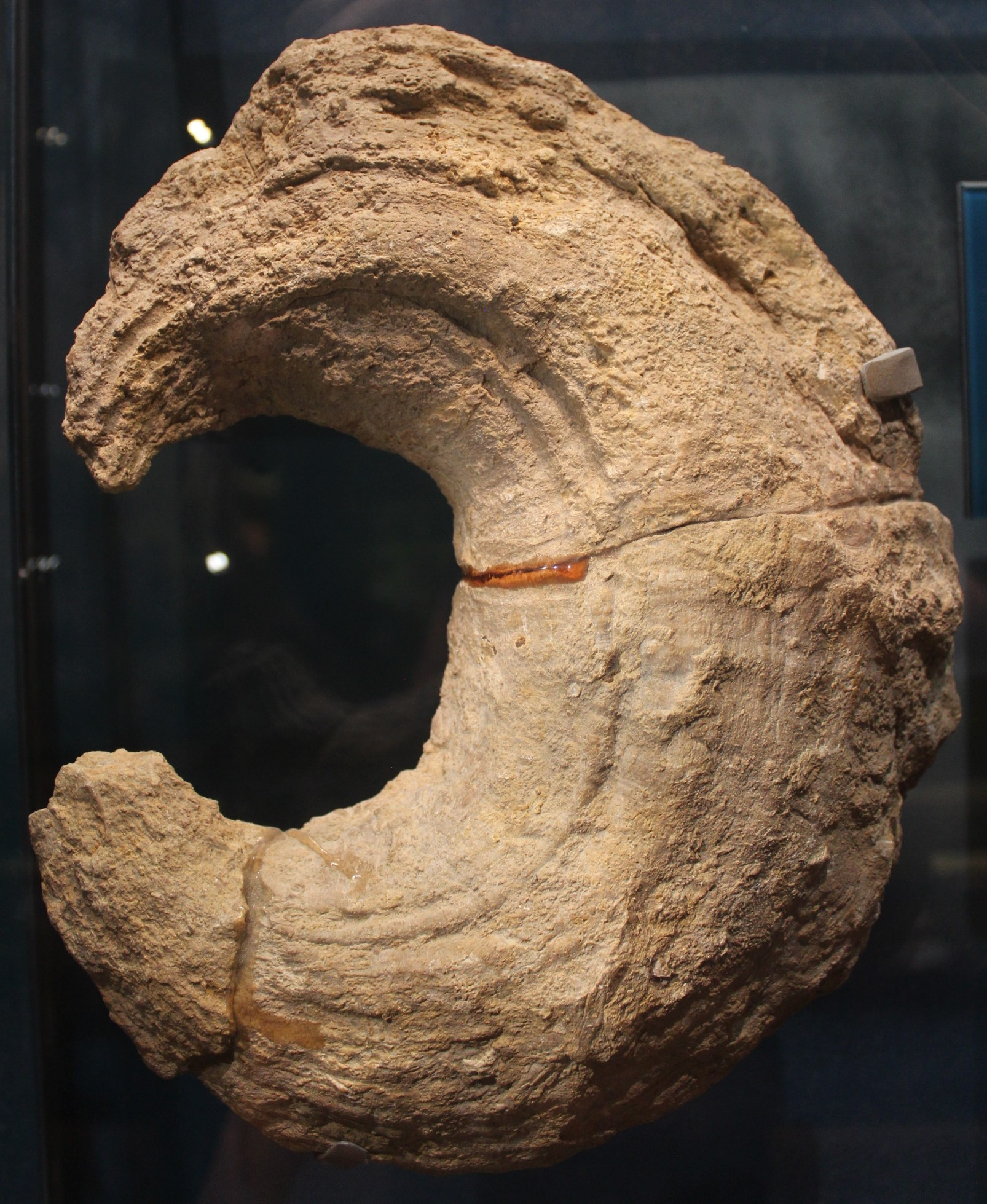
- Titanosarcolites fossil, National Museum of Natural History

Scientific classification
- Kingdom: Animalia
- Phylum: Mollusca
- Class: Bivalvia
- Order: †Hippuritida
- Family: †Antillocaprinidae
- Genus: †Titanosarcolites; Trechmann, 1924

= Titanosarcolites =

Titanosarcolites Temporal range: Campanian-Maastrichtian ~83–66 Ma

Extinct genus of bivalves

Titanosarcolites is a genus of giant rudist bivalve from the Cretaceous. Its fossils have been found in Jamaica, Southeastern Mexico and the Southern US. It belonged to the now extinct family known as Caprinidae, a group that went extinct during the KT extinction event, 66 MYA. Titanosarcolites was one of the last members of this group. There were several species, including T. alatus, T. giganteus, T. macgillavryi, and T. oddsensis.

== Description ==
Titanosarcolites was rather large, perhaps being 2 meters in overall size at its largest.
