= Belmont Formation, Grenada =

Geologic formation in Grenada

Belmont Formation
- Stratigraphic range: Burdigalian
- Type: Formation
- Sub-units: Kendace Calcareous Silt Member

Lithology
- Primary: Siltstone
- Other: Sandstone

Location
- Coordinates: 12.5°N 61.4°W
- Approximate paleocoordinates: 12.2°N 60.2°W
- Region: Carriacou
- Country: Grenada

Type section
- Named for: Belmont
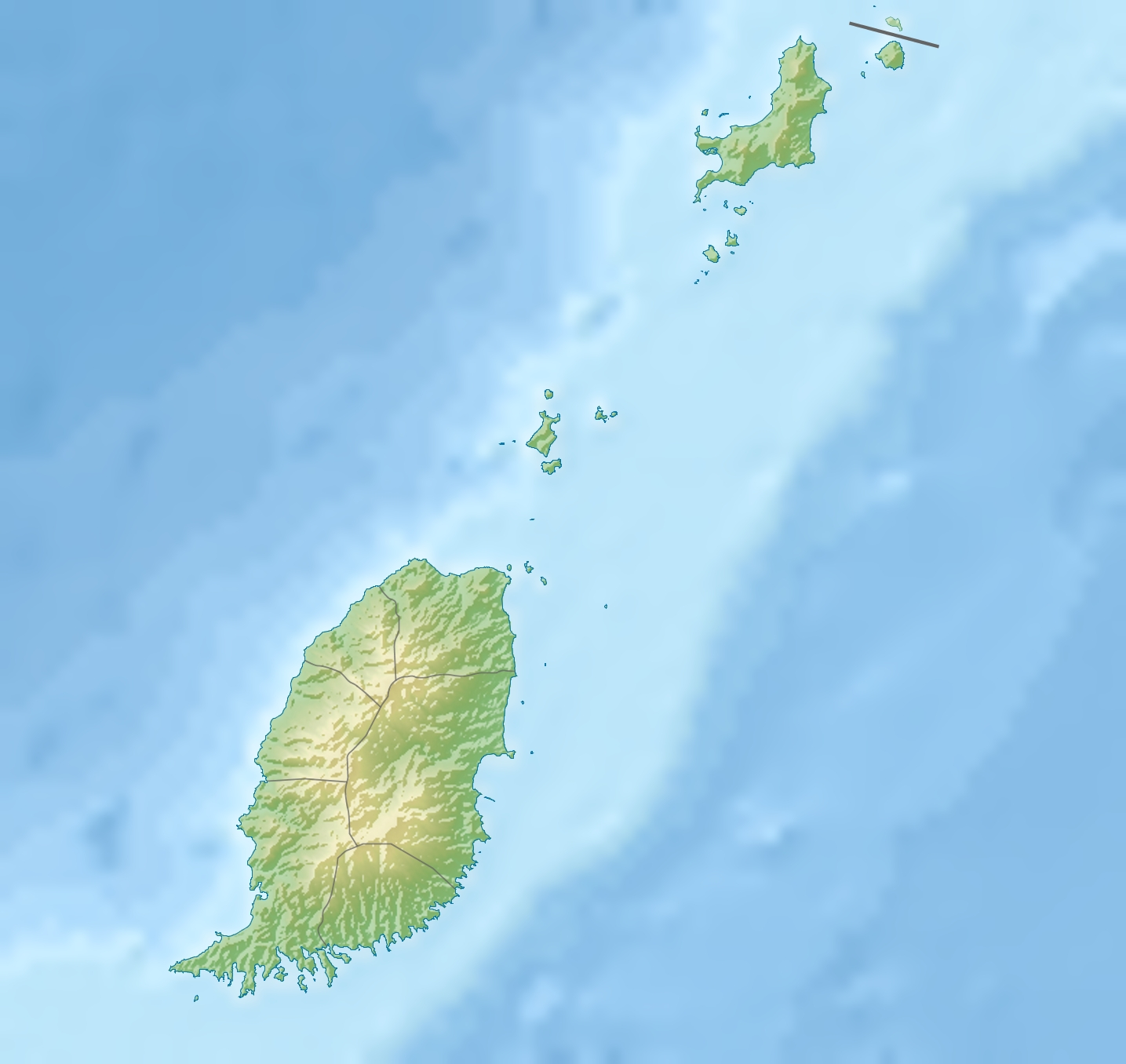
- Belmont Formation, Grenada (Grenada)

The Belmont Formation is a geologic formation in Grenada, named for the town in the southeast of Carriacou, where it occurs. It preserves fossils dating back to the Burdigalian period.

== See also ==
- List of fossiliferous stratigraphic units in Grenada
