= Bindstone =

Type of carbonate rock

Bindstone is a special type of carbonate rock in the Dunham classification. The term did not appear in the original Dunham classification from 1962 and was introduced by Embry and Klovan 1971 in the modified Dunham classification.

== Description ==
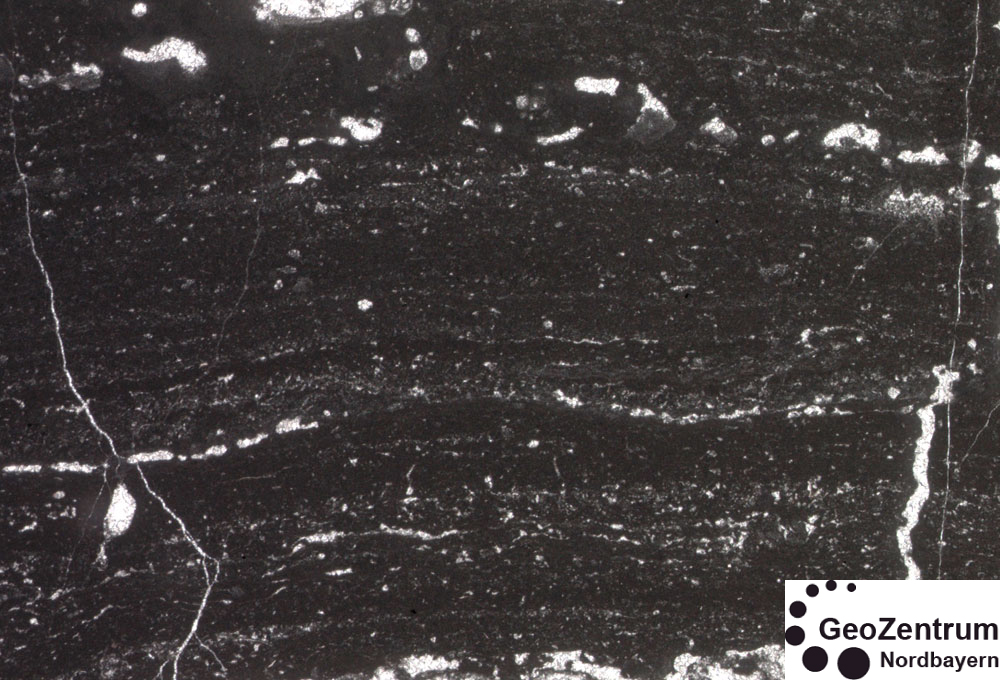
A thin section of a bindstone in the modified Dunham classification by Embry and Klovan (width of image is 9 mm)

Embry and Klovan (1971) define bindstones as rocks that "[...] contain in situ, tabular or lamellar fossils which encrusted and bound sediment during deposition. [...] The matrix, not the in situ fossils, forms the supporting framework of the rock, and the fossils may form as little as 15 percent of the constituents of the rock."

Wright (1991) uses bindstone as a synonym for boundstone, which is defined as a rock "[...] where the structure reflects the encrusting and binding action of plants or animals"

Lokier and Al Nunaibi (2016) define bindstones as "autochthonous carbonate-dominated rock in which the original components of the supporting matrix were organically bound through stabilization of the sediment at the time of deposition."

== Problems ==
One problem in the classification is that the term bindstone is easy to confuse with the term boundstone. Additionally the exact relation of the two terms changes depending on the classification used. For Embry and Klovan (1971), a boundstone is used for autochthonous carbonates if there is a lack of evidence for the more precise classifications as bafflestone, bindstone or framestone. In contrast to that, Wright (1991) uses boundstone and bindstone synonymously, which is not consistent with other authors.
