= Cotui Limestone =

Geological formation in Puerto Rico

- Stratigraphic range: Cretaceous
- Type: Formation

Lithology
- Primary: Limestone

Location
- Region: Caribbean
- Country: Puerto Rico

The Cotui Limestone is a geological formation in Puerto Rico. It preserves fossils dating back to the Cretaceous period.

== See also ==
- List of fossiliferous stratigraphic units in Puerto Rico
