= Bafflestone =

Type of carbonate rock

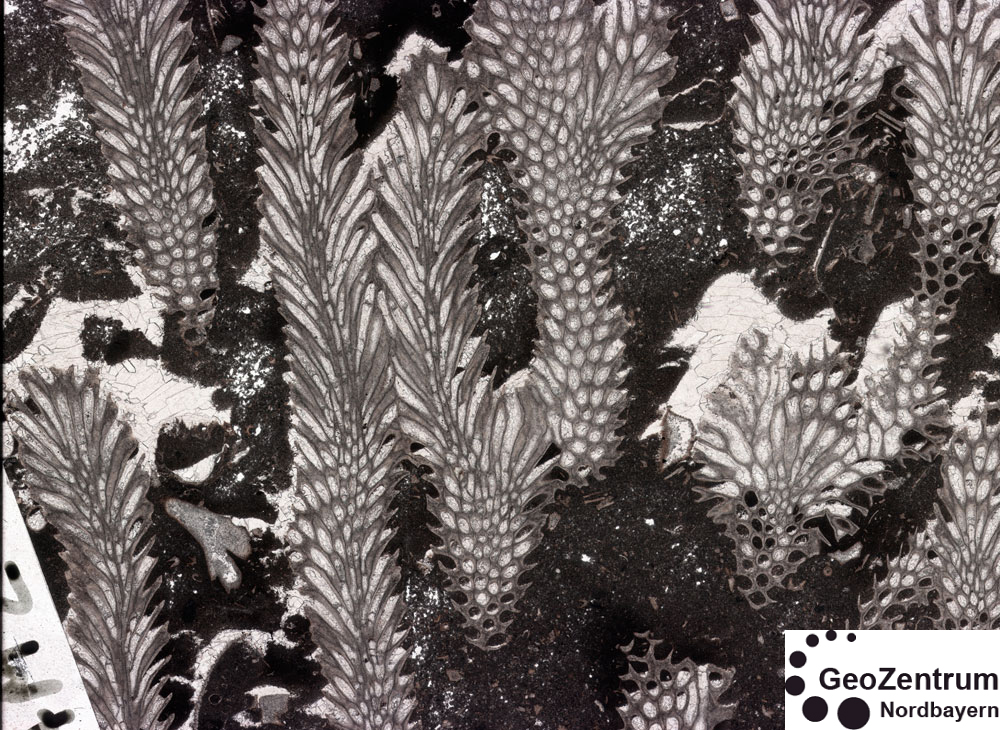
A bafflestone in thin section (width of image is 34 mm)

Bafflestone is a type of carbonate rock.

The Dunham Classification (Dunham, 1962) of limestones employed the term boundstone to encompass all carbonate rocks that exhibited any evidence of the original components being organically-bound together at the time of deposition. Embry & Klovan (1971) proposed the sub-division of the boundstone classification in order to reflect the different mechanisms of binding within these autochthonous carbonate sediments. The classification bafflestone was proposed to describe sediments that formed where organic baffling resulted in a reduction in flow and a consequent deposition of suspended material. However, even at the time of introducing the new classification, Embry & Klovan (1971), noted that the class bafflestone was highly-interpretive and, the mechanism of formation was difficult to prove requiring "...a good imagination on the part of the geologist”.

Following a survey of the usage of different carbonate classification systems, Lokier and Al Junaibi (2016) proposed that the interpretive term bafflestone be removed from the modified Dunham Classification system as these autochthonous organic growth fabrics are more appropriately described as framestone.
