= Canímar River =

River in northern Cuba

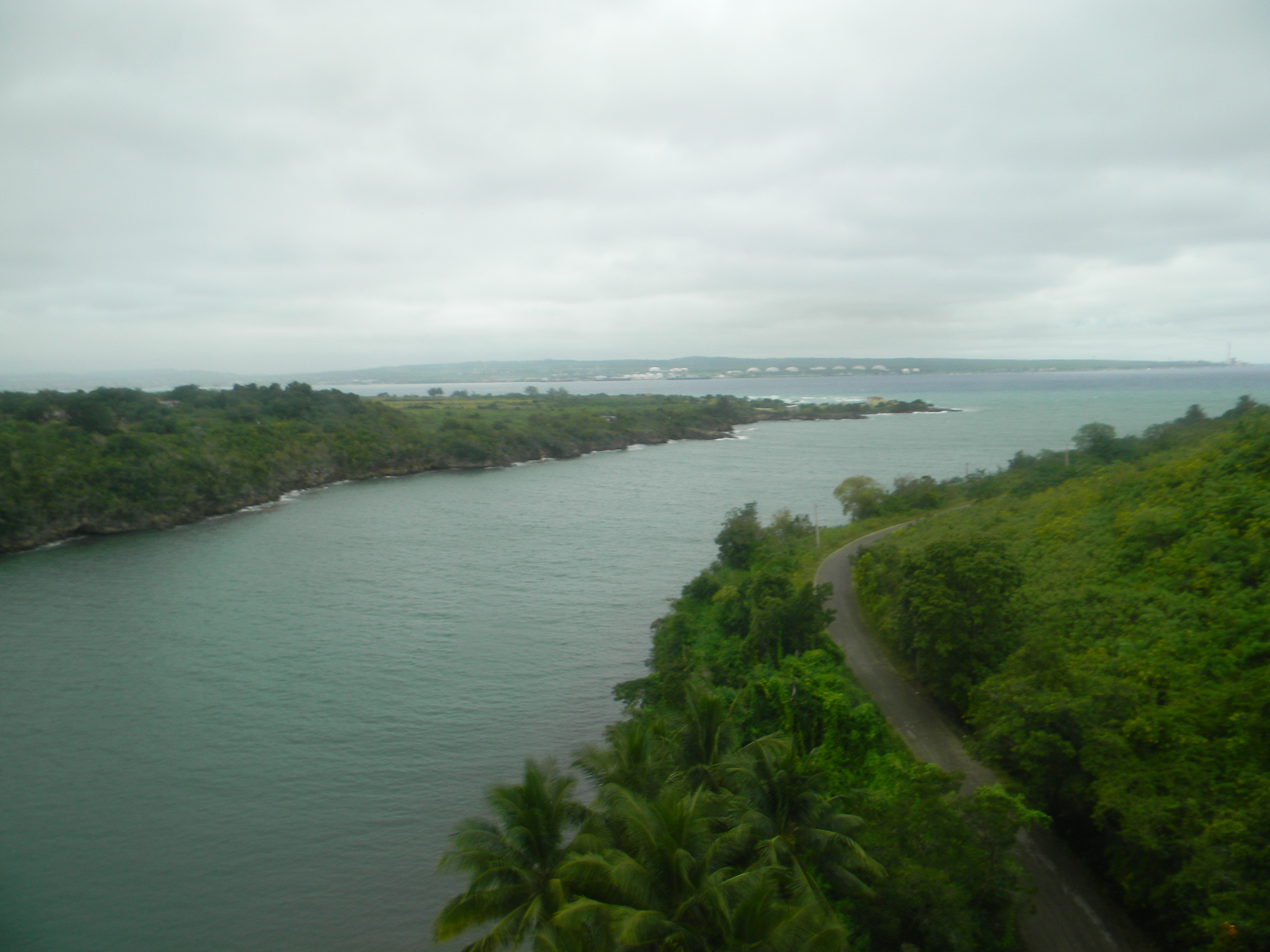
Canímar River

Canímar River is a river of northern Cuba. It reaches the sea at Matanzas, south-est side of the Matanzas Bay.

== See also ==
- List of rivers of Cuba
