= Sabana Grande Formation =

- Stratigraphic range: Late Campanian
- Type: Formation

Lithology
- Primary: Conglomerate
- Other: Limestone

Location
- Coordinates: 18.1°N 67.1°W
- Approximate paleocoordinates: 15.8°N 58.4°W
- Region: Caribbean
- Country: Puerto Rico
- Sabana Grande Formation (Puerto Rico)

The Sabana Grande Formation is a geologic formation in western Puerto Rico. The conglomerates and limestones of the formation preserve gastropod fossils of Trochactaeon woodsi dating back to the Late Campanian period.

== See also ==
- List of fossiliferous stratigraphic units in Puerto Rico
