= Rocky Boy =

Rocky Boy or Rocky Boys may refer to:

- Rocky Boy Indian Reservation, in Montana, United States, home to the Chippewa-Cree people
  - Rocky Boy (Chippewa leader), leader of his people who advocated for the eponymous reservation
