= Buyé Beach =

Beach in Cabo Rojo, Puerto Rico

Coordinates: 18°2′55″N 67°11′55″W

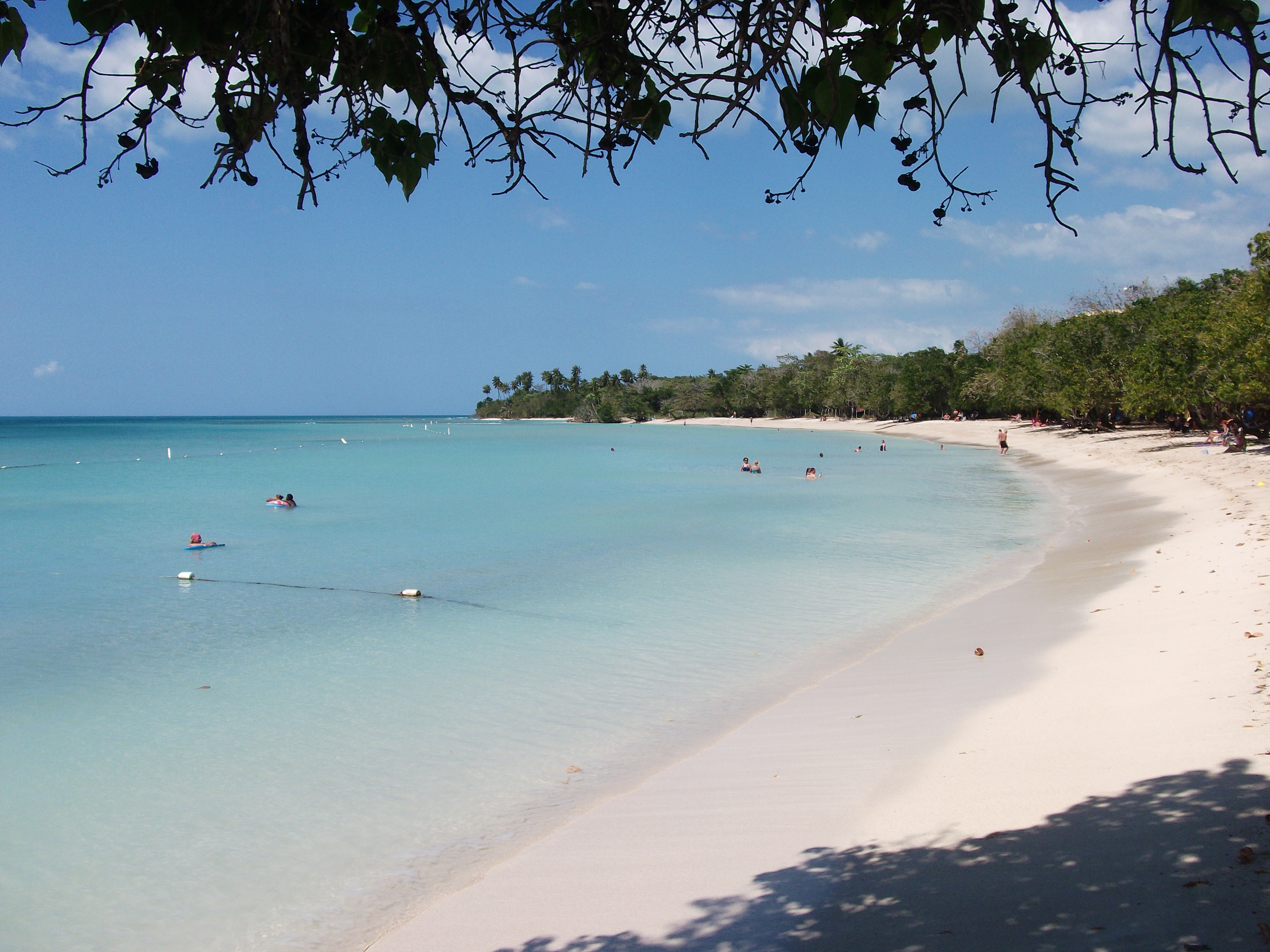
Buyé Beach in Cabo Rojo, Puerto Rico

Buyé Beach (Spanish: Playa Buyé) is a Caribbean beach that is located in Cabo Rojo, on the south-western coast of Puerto Rico.

== Gallery ==
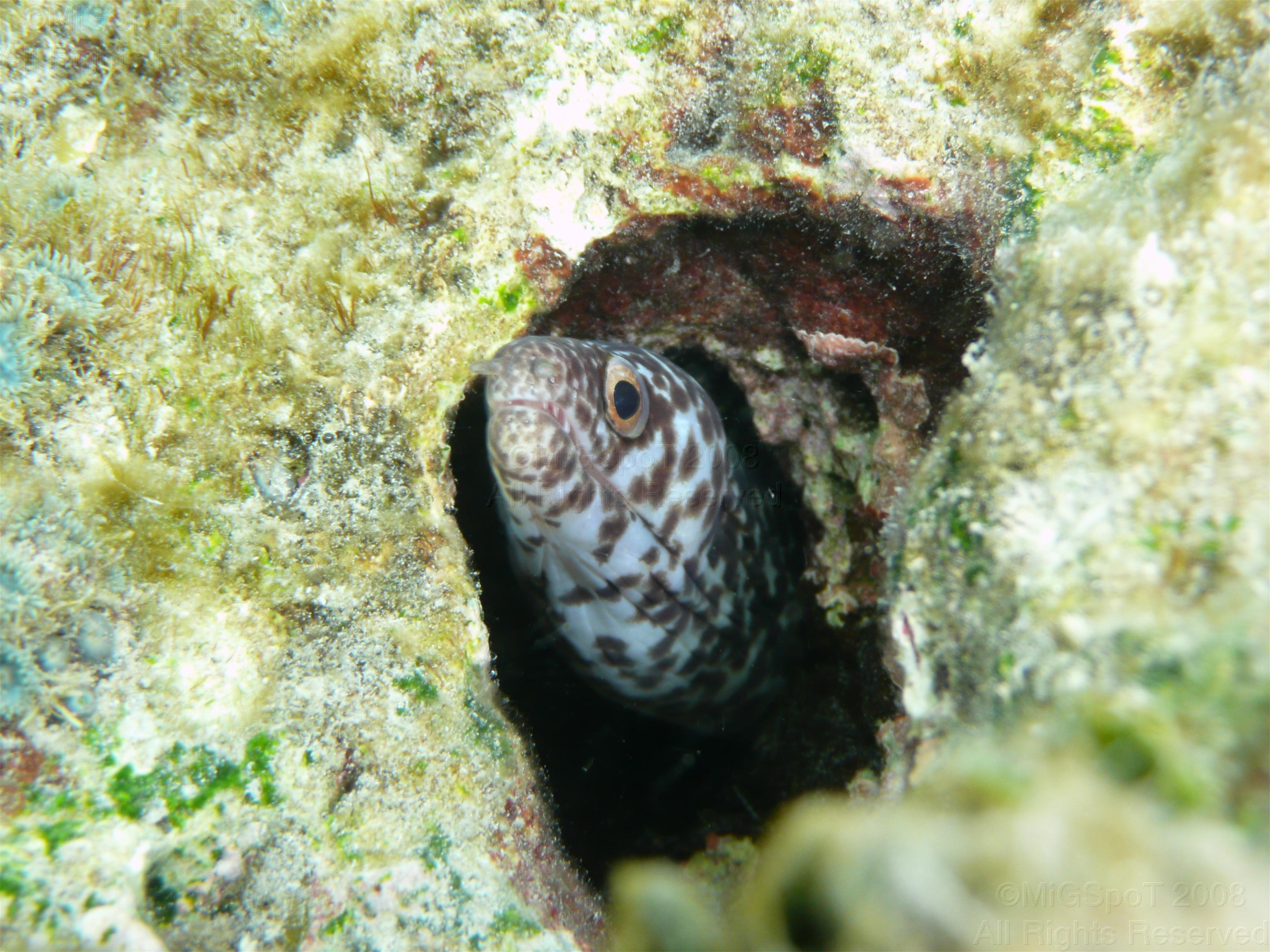
Spotted moray (Gymnothorax moringa) in Playa Buyé. The beach area offers opportunities to see marine wildlife.

== See also ==
- List of beaches in Puerto Rico
- Tourism in Puerto Rico
