= Cipero Marl =

Geologic formation in Trinidad and Tobago

- Stratigraphic range: Early Oligocene-Burdigalian
- Type: Formation
- Sub-units: St. Croix Limestone

Lithology
- Primary: Marl
- Other: Limestone

Location
- Coordinates: 10.2°N 61.5°W
- Approximate paleocoordinates: 9.2°N 56.7°W
- Country: Trinidad and Tobago
- Cipero Marl (Trinidad and Tobago)

The Cipero Marl is a geologic formation in Trinidad and Tobago. It preserves fossils dating back to the Early Oligocene to Burdigalian period.

== See also ==
- List of fossiliferous stratigraphic units in Trinidad and Tobago
