= San Fernando Formation, Trinidad and Tobago =

San Fernando Formation
- Stratigraphic range: Oligocene
- Type: Formation
- Sub-units: Flat Rock Member

Lithology
- Primary: Claystone

Location
- Coordinates: 10.3°N 61.5°W
- Approximate paleocoordinates: 9.0°N 56.3°W
- Country: Trinidad and Tobago

Type section
- Named for: San Fernando

The San Fernando Formation is a geologic formation in Trinidad and Tobago. The open marine claystones preserve fossils dating back to the Oligocene period.

== See also ==
- List of fossiliferous stratigraphic units in Trinidad and Tobago
