= Orthaulax =

Scientific classification
- Kingdom: Animalia
- Phylum: Mollusca
- Class: Gastropoda
- Subclass: Caenogastropoda
- Order: Littorinimorpha
- Family: Strombidae
- Genus: Orthaulax; Gabb, 1872

Genus of extinct gastropod

Orthaulax is an extinct genus of sea snails in the family Strombidae.

== Description ==
Orthaulax have spires and spiral lines, which vary based on species and age of the specimen. Initially, Orthaulax was thought to not show signs of variation in color, but it has later been discovered that colored patterns can be seen on non-eroded specimens of Orthaulax when they are shined with an ultraviolet light.

== Geology ==
Its fossils are most often found in areas with high lime content. Examples of Orthaulax have been dated to the Oligocene and Miocene.

== Species ==
- O. aguadillensis (Maury, 1920)
- O. altilis (Pilsbry, 1922)
- O. bermudezi (Clench and Aguayo, 1939)
- O. brasiliensis (Maury, 1925)
- O. caepa (Cooke, 1921)
- O. conoides (Woodring, 1923)
- O. dainellii (Savazzi, 1989)
- O. gabbi (Dall, 1890)
- O. hernandoensis (Mansfield, 1937)
- O. inornatus (Gabb, 1872)
- O. japonicus (Nagao, 1924)
- O. portoricoensis (Hubbard, 1921)
- O. pugnax (Heilprin, 1887)
- O. seaforthensis (Trechmann, 1941)
