= Framestone =

Type of carbonate rock

A framestone is a special type of carbonate rock in the Dunham classification.

== Description ==
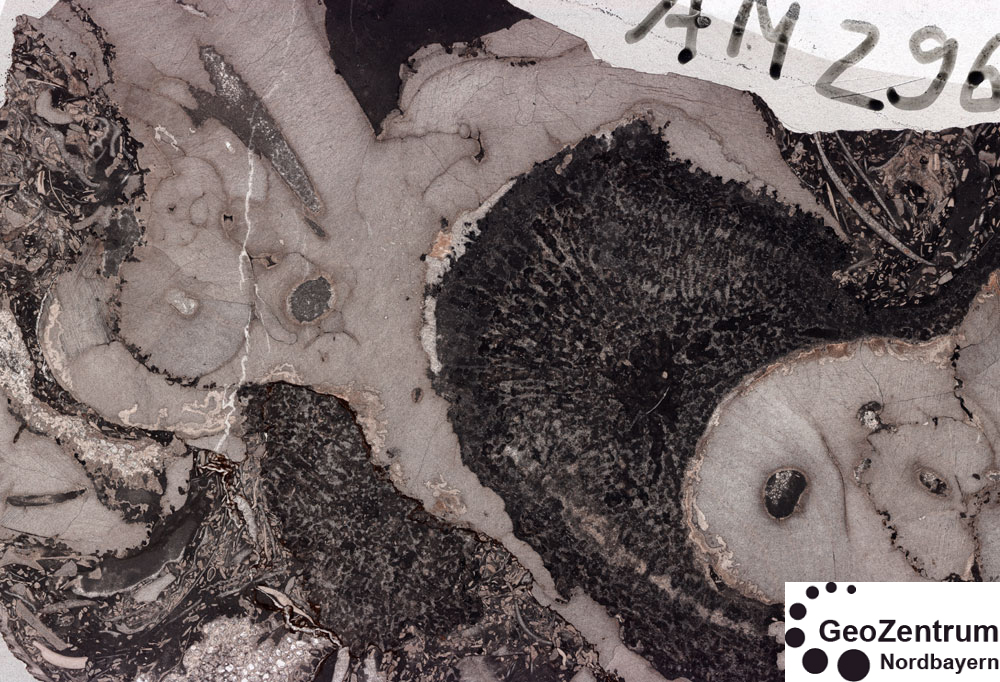
A thin section of a Framestone (width of picture is 36 mm). The rigid framework is built by sponges and crinoids.

The term "framestone" was not used in the original Dunham classification by Dunham (1962).

It first appeared in the modified Dunham classification by Embry and Klovan (1971) where it is described as an autochthonous limestone having "in situ massive fossils which constructed a rigid three-dimensional framework during deposition. The in situ fossils therefore form the supporting framework of the rock, with matrix material occurring in the interstices between the fossils."

Lokier and Al Junaibi(2016) define a framestone as "an autochthonous carbonate-dominated rock supported by a rigid organic framework developed at the time of deposition."

== Interpretive problems ==
One possible problem in the interpretation of framestones is that the framework can be of different sizes from millimeters to meters, so they might not be present on the thin section. Some organisms can also be binding and build frames, so they might produce bindstones/boundstones and framestones. In some cases it might also be hard to decide whether a fossil was rigid or not during deposition.
