= Canoa (disambiguation) =

Canoa can refer to:

- Canoa a town in San Vicente, Ecuador
- Canoa: A Shameful Memory is a 1976 Mexican drama film
- Canoa Formation is an Ecuador mountain range
- Canoa, Cuba is a hamlet in Villa Clara, Cuba
- Arroyo La Canoa a creek in Villa Clara, Cuba
- Cana, a Coahuiltecan tribe sometimes spelled Canoa
