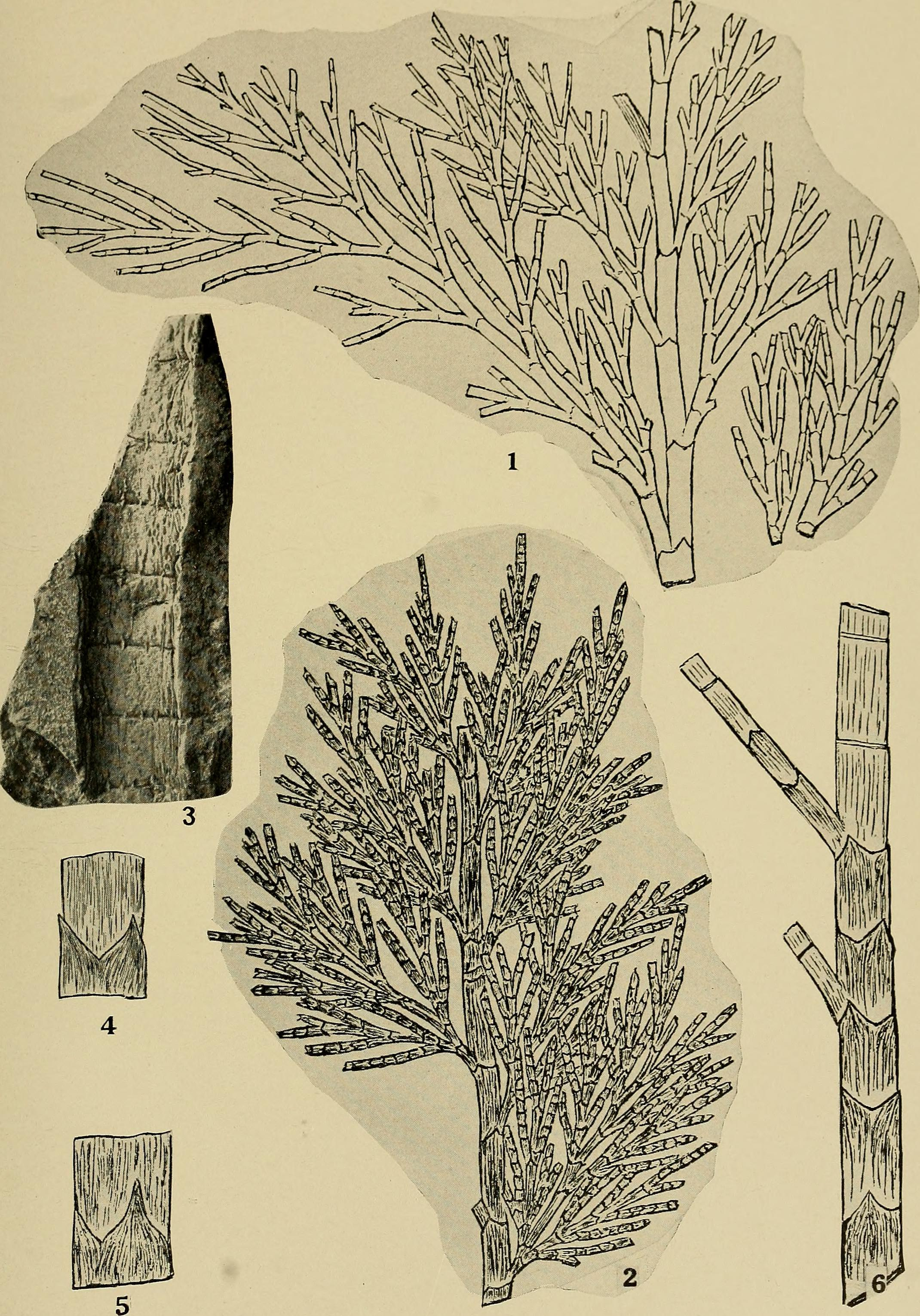
- Frenelopsis cf. Ramosissima from Paja Formation, Colombia

Scientific classification
- Kingdom: Plantae
- Clade: Embryophytes
- Clade: Tracheophytes
- Clade: Spermatophytes
- Clade: Gymnosperms
- Division: Pinophyta
- Class: Pinopsida
- Order: Pinales
- Family: †Cheirolepidiaceae
- Genus: †Frenelopsis; Schenk

Species
- F. alata; F. antunesii; F. atlantica; F. callapezii; F. choschiensis; F. harrisii; F. hoheneggeri; F. justae; F. malaiana; F. occidentalis; F. oligostomata; F. profetiensis; F. ramosissima; F. rubiesensis; F. sifloana; F. teixeirae; F. turolensis; F. ugnaensis; F. veneta

Diversity
- 18 species

= Frenelopsis =

Frenelopsis Temporal range: Berriasian–Maastrichtian

Prehistoric genus of plants

Frenelopsis is a genus of extinct conifers belonging to the family Cheirolepidiaceae that lived throughout the Cretaceous period ranging from the Berriasian to the Maastrichtian stages, containing a total of 18 species. It is a form classification describing the shoots of the plant, and is accompanied by the genera Classopollis, Classostrobus, and Alvinia. These represent the pollen, male cones, and female cones respectively. They are likely to have been a major source of lignite in Cretaceous deposits.

== Description and biology ==
The shoots of Frenelopsis consist of a round, jointed stem with small, sheathing leaves at the nodes. The leaves are arranged oppositely or in whorls of three. The latter of the two is the most common in the genus. The leaves' margins are lined with hairs. It is speculated that these hairs are used to capture atmospheric moisture at night. The stems are coated in a thick cuticle and the stomata are recessed in sunken pits. The guard cells of the stomata are sunken and surrounded by a ring of four to six subsidiary cells bearing an outer and sometimes an inner papilla. These papillae overhang and enclose the stomatal pit. The stems and leaves are photosynthetic and succulent. They are speculated to have a growth form similar to a salt marsh shrub or mangrove. However, it is more probable that they resemble the former. It is speculated that the growth form of the entire plant ranged from being a shrub to trees growing up to 20 meters in height

The Classostrobus cones of Frenelopsis often are found near the shoots. However, there are some rare cases where they are still attached to the shoot. The male cones can range from being rounded to elliptically shaped. Some species had particularly elongated male cones. They are 3.5–15 mm (0.1–0.6 in) long and 2.5–11 mm (0.1–0.4 in) wide. The cone scales are rhombus-shaped with acute to acuminate tips. These cone scales are helically arranged around the cone and grow smaller near the base of the cone. The scales continue past the base of the cone and onto the sterile shoot, growing smaller still. The distal margins share the same marginal hairs as the vegetative leaves.

The Classopollis pollen associated with Frenelopsis is oval shaped when viewed from above. A sub-equatorial, circular furrow can also be viewed from this perspective. This furrow bisects the pollen grain into two unequal sections. While the pollen can exist singly, it is more often found in tetrads.

The large Alvinia cones associated with Frenelopsis consist of helically arranged scales. The female cones are larger at 4.5 cm (1.8 in) wide. These scales in turn consist of a covering flap and three appendages that together form a funnel-like structure. Inside the funnel is an array of short hairs. Classopollis has been found caught in the hairs, indicating that it may be a proto stigmatic region. Combined with the funnel shape of the scale, it may provide evidence of insect pollination. However, wind pollination is also likely. Each scale contains one to two seeds, which remain within the scale. This is speculated to provide the seeds protection from the elements. It is also speculated that these enclosed seeds were dispersed by the wind. The cones' flattened shape in fossils provides evidence that they consist of soft tissues and are herbaceous in nature. The rarity of complete cones provides also provides evidence that these cones disintegrate shortly after the seeds form. Alvinia is associated to Frenelopsis by the presence of Classopollis spores, which in turn are associated with Classostrobus cones that are at times directly connected to Frenelopsis itself.

== Habitat and ecology ==
Frenelopsis fossils have been found in association with coastal marine deposits. When combined with the genus' morphological similarity to other halophiles like the former family Chenopodiaceae, it can be assumed that they too are adapted to halophilic conditions. They are believed to have lived in salt marsh and mangrove habitats. It is also implied that they are adapted to aridity given signs of water stress in fossil remains. However, this could also be implicative of the presence of salt, as it too can cause water stress. They are also associated with eutrophic conditions and regions with high groundwater levels. Despite these affinities to halophilic environments, they are not obligately halophilic. In addition to this, they have also been found in association with freshwater environments, like lakesides and freshwater floodplains. The high ecological plasticity of Frenelopsis likely allowed them to compete with angiosperm plants, which outcompeted many other non-flowering clades.

== Distribution, history, and extinction ==
The fossils have been found in low to middle latitudes across the northern hemisphere during the Cretaceous. They were most common in the Tethyan Archipelago, which spanned across what is now Europe. However, a few other species have been found in Asia, North America, South America, and Africa.

Frenelopsis initially had a wide range between the Berriasian and Hauterivian stages of the Cretaceous spanning from the Tethyan Archipelago in Europe to eastern Asia. Between the Barremian and the Aptian stages, the genus underwent a specific radiation across the Tethyan Archipelago while disappearing from Africa. In Asia, the genus becomes restricted to Japan in the form of F. choschiensis. Meanwhile, a F. ramosissima colonized America. Between the Albian and Cenomanian stages, Frenelopsis species diversity decreased, but was still prominent. Many short-lived species cropped up across the Tethyan Archipelago that were endemic to their respective islands. There, however, were also long-lived species. One of which, F. alata, spread across and dominated the archipelago. F. ramosissima still persisted through this time, while F. harrisii appeared in what is now Tajikistan while F. choschiensis has long since gone extinct. Between the Turonian and Santonian stages, the genus was extirpated outside of the Tethyan Archipelago. A few species periodically appeared and continued to play a major role in the archipelago. Finally, towards the end of the Cretaceous period in the Campanian and Maastrichtian stages, only F. oligostomata of Frenelopsis remained on the Iberoamorican domain, a large island consisting of what is now the Iberian Peninsula and western France. While the species was the last, it still dominated the areas it grew in, existing in large numbers in what would become Portugal and the Pyrenees. The most probable cause of extinction for the genus was the mass sterilization of pollen.
