= Santa Rosa Formation =

Santa Rosa Formation may refer to:

- Santa Rosa Formation, New Mexico, Triassic geologic formation of New Mexico
- Santa Rosa Formation, Colombia, Lower Cretaceous geologic formation of Colombia

== See also ==
- Santa Rosa Group, a geologic group in Belize and Guatemala
