= Terraba Basin Group =

Geologic formation group in Costa Rica

- Stratigraphic range: Neogene
- Type: Group

Location
- Country: Costa Rica

The Terraba Basin Group is a geologic group in Costa Rica. It preserves fossils dating back to the Neogene period.

== See also ==
- List of fossiliferous stratigraphic units in Costa Rica
