= Penita Formation =

Geologic formation in Costa Rica

- Stratigraphic range: Early Pliocene
- Type: Formation
- Unit of: Charco Azul Group
- Underlies: Armuelles Formation
- Overlies: Charco Azul Formation

Location
- Country: Costa Rica

The Penita Formation is a geologic formation in Costa Rica. It preserves fossils dating back to the Neogene period.

== See also ==
- List of fossiliferous stratigraphic units in Costa Rica
