= Geology of Nicaragua =

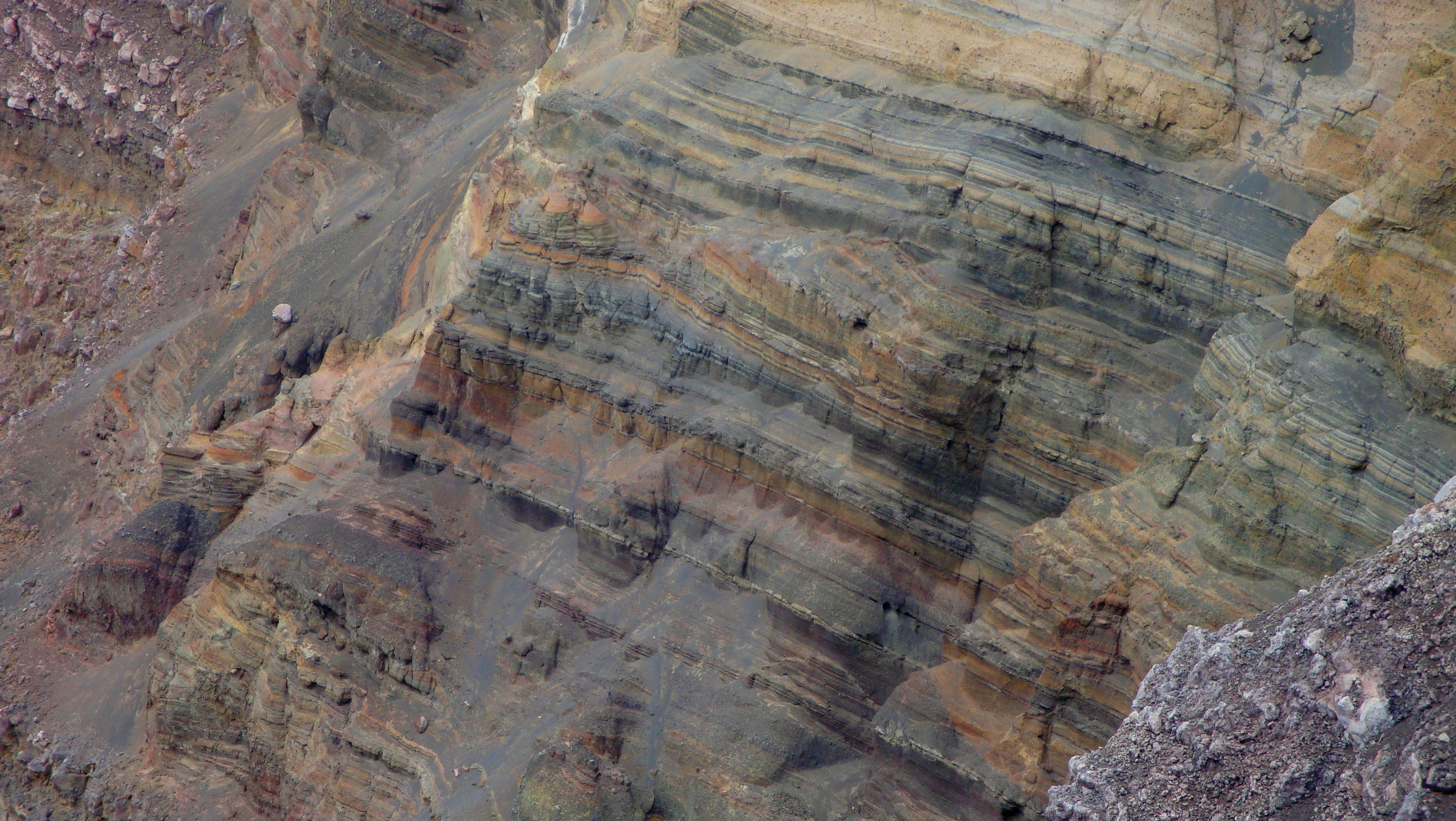
Nicaragua - Masaya Volcano National Park

The geology of Nicaragua includes Paleozoic crystalline basement rocks, Mesozoic intrusive igneous rocks and sedimentary rocks spanning the Cretaceous to the Pleistocene. Volcanoes erupted in the Paleogene and within the last 2.5 million years of the Quaternary, due to the subduction of the Cocos Plate, which drives melting and magma creation. Many of these volcanoes are in the Nicaraguan Depression paralleled by the northwest-trending Middle America Trench which marks the Caribbean-Cocos plate boundary. Almost all the rocks in Nicaragua originated as dominantly felsic continental crust, unlike other areas in the region which include stranded sections of mafic oceanic crust. Structural geologists have grouped all the rock units as the Chortis Block.

== Volcanology ==
Sitting on the Central America Volcanic Arc volcanism remains active in Nicaragua. The Masaya Caldera Complex erupted 460,000 and 50,000 years ago with the Las Sierras Formation as a Pliocene-Pleistocene basement rock. Massive pyroclastic and ignimbrite eruptions caused the caldera to collapse although most of the material it erupted has been basalt. Analysis of an eruption of the caldera in 1772 indicates perhaps the highest rate of lava effusion in Central America. Another active volcano is the San Cristobal Volcanic Complex in the northwest, which erupted in the 1500s and 1600s and again at a reduced level in 1971, with tholeiitic, calc-alkaline and andesite material.

== Natural resource geology ==
Nicaragua has 94 metal deposits and 46 non-metallic deposits. It is the leading gold producer in Central America from deposits in Bonanza, La Libertad and Limon, in epithermal and mesothermal vein deposits, as well as skarn and placer deposits. Eight million ounces of gold have been extracted since 1930. Copper, zinc, silver, limestone, aggregate, clay and gypsum are also important resources.

Between 1943 and 1977, seismic and drilling surveys were done on the Miskito Basin off the eastern shore in search of oil.

The Momotombo geothermal field was discovered in 1970, 50 kilometers northeast of Managua adjacent to Momotombo Volcano. Thirty three wells were drilled by 1981 with more than 100 megawatts of power potential.
