= Río Banano Formation =

Geologic formation in Costa Rica

- Stratigraphic range: Middle Miocene-Piacenzian
- Type: Formation
- Unit of: Limón Group
- Underlies: Moin Formation
- Overlies: Uscari Formation

Lithology
- Primary: Sandstone, siltstone
- Other: Claystone

Location
- Coordinates: 9.9°N 83.1°W
- Approximate paleocoordinates: 9.8°N 83.3°W
- Region: Limón Province
- Country: Costa Rica

Type section
- Named for: Banano River
- Río Banano Formation (Costa Rica)

The Río Banano Formation is a geologic formation in Costa Rica of the Limón Group. It preserves fossils dating back to the Middle Miocene to Piacenzian period.

== Fossil content ==
- Aphera bananensis
- Isopisthus acer
- Pacuarescarus

== See also ==
- List of fossiliferous stratigraphic units in Costa Rica
