= Bohio =

Bohio may refer to:

- The Bohio Formation, a geologic formation in Panama
- USS Bohio (1856), an armed brig in commission in the United States Navy from 1861 to 1865 that saw service in the American Civil War
- Bohio, perceived Indigenous name on Cuba for Hispaniola at the time of Columbus' first visit in the Santa María (ship)
