= Valle de Ángeles Group =

- Stratigraphic range: Late Albian-Early Turonian
- Type: Group
- Sub-units: Esquias Formation, Valle de Angeles Redbeds

Lithology
- Primary: Sandstone, claystone
- Other: Conglomerate

Location
- Coordinates: 14.7°N 87.5°W
- Approximate paleocoordinates: 14.7°N 69.3°W
- Region: Ocotepeque & Comayagua Departments
- Country: Honduras

Type section
- Named for: Valle de Ángeles
- Valle de Ángeles Group (Honduras)

The Valle de Ángeles Group is a geologic group in Honduras. It preserves fossils such as ornithopod and iguanodontid dinosaurs dating back to the Late Albian to Early Turonian stages of the Cretaceous period.

== See also ==
- List of fossiliferous stratigraphic units in Honduras
