= Urraca Formation =

Geologic formation in Panama

- Stratigraphic range: Early Pleistocene
- Type: Formation
- Sub-units: Hill Point & Mimitimbi Members

Lithology
- Primary: Limestone

Location
- Coordinates: 9.4°N 82.3°W
- Approximate paleocoordinates: 9.4°N 82.0°W
- Region: Bocas del Toro
- Country: Panama

Type section
- Named for: Urraca private island
- Urraca Formation (Panama)

The Urraca Formation is a geologic formation in Panama. The reefal limestone formation preserves coral fossils dating to the Early Pleistocene.

== See also ==
- List of fossiliferous stratigraphic units in Panama
