= Herreria Formation =

Geologic formation in Guatemala

- Stratigraphic range: Miocene
- Type: Formation

Location
- Coordinates: 15.6°N 88.9°W
- Approximate paleocoordinates: 15.9°N 87.7°W
- Region: Izabal Department
- Country: Guatemala
- Herreria Formation (Guatemala)

The Herreria Formation is a geologic formation in northeastern Guatemala. It preserves fossils dating back to the Miocene period.

== Fossil content ==
- Rhynchotherium blicki

== See also ==
- List of fossiliferous stratigraphic units in Guatemala
