= Tuira Formation =

Geologic formation in Panama

- Stratigraphic range: Tortonian (Clarendonian-Hemphillian); 11–9.5 Ma
- Type: Formation

Location
- Coordinates: 8.5°N 77.7°W
- Approximate paleocoordinates: 8.2°N 76.3°W
- Region: Darién Province
- Country: Panama

Type section
- Named for: Tuira River
- Tuira Formation (Panama)

The Tuira Formation is a geologic formation in Panama. It preserves bivalve, gastropod and sponge fossils dating back to the Tortonian period (Clarendonian to Hemphillian in the NALMA classification), from 11 to 9.5 Ma.

== Fossil content ==
Among others, the following fossils have been reported from the formation:

- Monoplex panamensis
- Umbrina opima
- Ogilbichthys dariensis

== See also ==
- List of fossiliferous stratigraphic units in Panama
