= Alajuela Formation =

Geologic formation in Panama

- Stratigraphic range: Tortonian (Earliest Hemphillian or Latest Clarendonian); 9.99–9.55 Ma
- Type: Formation
- Sub-units: See text
- Underlies: alluvium
- Overlies: Caimito Formation
- Area: 25 km^{2} (9.7 sq mi)
- Thickness: >110 m (360 ft) (total); 82 m (269 ft) (composite)

Lithology
- Primary: Sandstone
- Other: Limestone, conglomerate

Location
- Coordinates: 9.2124°N 79.5936°W
- Approximate paleocoordinates: 9.0°N 78.2°W
- Region: Panamá Province
- Country: Panama
- Extent: Panama Basin

Type section
- Named for: Lake Alajuela
- Named by: Woodring
- Year defined: 1957
- Alajuela Formation (Panama)

The Alajuela Formation, originally Alhajuela Formation (Tau), is a Late Miocene (Tortonian, Early Hemphillian or Latest Clarendonian in the NALMA classification) geologic formation in the Panama Canal Zone of central Panama.

The formation overlies the Caimito Formation and comprises sandstones, limestones and conglomerates deposited in a tidal-dominated estuarine to shallow marine environment.

The formation crops out in a small area along the southern and western shores of Lake Alajuela, of which it derives its name, and preserves a rich fossil faunal assemblage of mammals, fish (among which fossil teeth of megalodon), invertebrates and flora. The fauna is of paleontological significance as an insight into the ecosystem of Central America preceding the Great American Biotic Interchange (GABI).

== Description ==
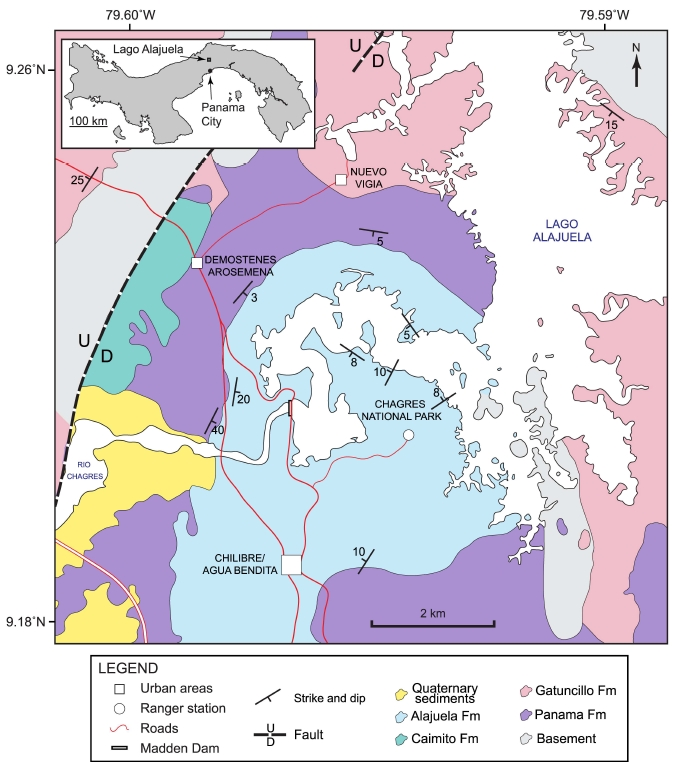
Map of the Panama Basin with the Alajuela Formation in light blue

The Alajuela Formation, in older literature also referred to as Alhajuela Formation, was first described as a member of the Caimito Formation by USGS geologist W.P. Woodring in 1957. The member was named after Lake Alajuela, where the type section was described. In 1970, Woodring elevated the member to a formation. The Alajuela formation crops out in the Panama Basin along the southwestern shores of and on islands in Lake Alajuela.

Woodring (1970) divided the elevated Alhajuela Formation into two members; a lower member consisting of the former calcareous sandstone member of the Caimito Formation and a lens of sandy limestone formerly designated the Chilibrillo limestone member of the Caimito Formation. The upper member was described as the former Alhajuela sandstone member of the Caimito Formation. The author estimated the thickness of the formation to be 115 to 145 metres (377 to 476 ft).

=== Stratigraphy ===
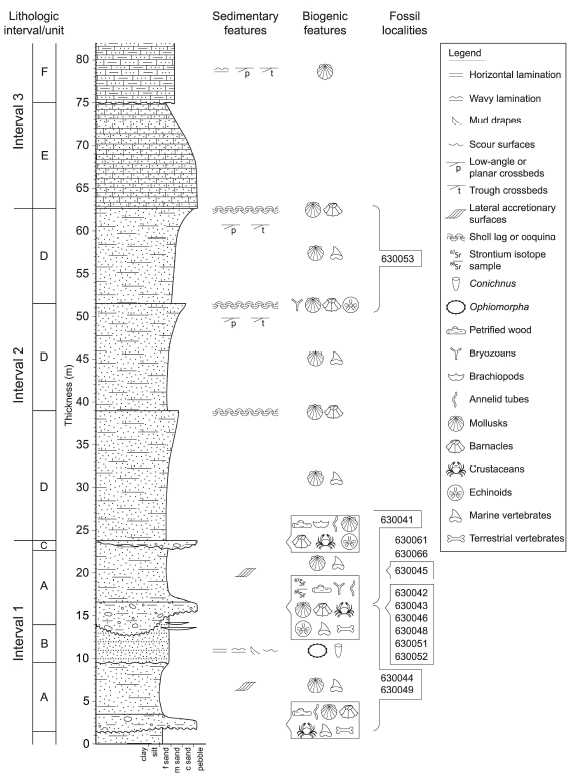
Composite stratigraphic section of 82 m (269 ft) of the Alajuela Formation. Fossil localities are indicated.

While Woodring originally described the formation in two members, MacFadden et al. (2017) define three distinct lithological intervals in the composite section, measured in proximity to the fossil localities on the southern extent of Lago Alajuela, of the formation. The succession starts with a more than 25 metres (82 ft) thick basal package of interbedded, clast-supported conglomerates and litharenite sandstones, grading into an approximately 85 metres (279 ft) thick package of calcareous sandstones and calcarenites, representing a transition from tide-dominated, potentially estuarine, coastal environment to a wave-dominated, shallow water carbonate environment.

==== Interval I ====
Within the basal-most Interval 1, laterally-extensive horizons of amalgamated conglomerate lenses fine upwards into fine-to-medium grained sandstones, truncated by erosional contacts with overlying units. The best exposed amalgamated conglomerate exhibits substantial variability in thickness (1 to 6 metres (3.3 to 19.7 ft)), with an average thickness of about 3 metres (9.8 ft). The amalgamated conglomerates are generally clast-supported, but locally matrix-supported, with the coarse grain fraction rarely exceeding 5 centimetres (2.0 in) in diameter. Weathered exposures of the conglomeratic horizons erroneously appear matrix-supported due to diagenetic dissolution of aragonitic shell material. Prior to such dissolution, the coarse fraction would likely have been dominated by mollusk shells, whereas well-rounded, pebble- to cobble-sized volcanic fragments (welded tuff and andesite) and silicified woods comprise the minor component of the coarse fraction. Fossil invertebrate remains primarily consist of internal and external molds of mollusk shells preserved in fine-grained sand matrix as well as some original calcitic shell material of scallops and oysters.

The amalgamated conglomerates contain the most abundant vertebrate fossils, both well-preserved remains of marine vertebrates (e.g., sharks) and highly weathered remains of terrestrial vertebrates. The conglomerate exhibits a dm-scale gradational contact with a poorly sorted, fine-to-medium-grained sandstone with abundant lithic and feldspar grains. The sandstone is locally tuffaceous and exhibits, in some exposures, low-angle, dm-thick bedforms that are internally massive and dip perpendicularly to the overall attitude of the Alajuela Formation. Otherwise, the sandstone appears massive and highly bioturbated, containing a lower density of molluscan molds than the underlying conglomerate. Original molluscan shell material and marine vertebrate fossils are present but rare. No terrestrial vertebrate remains have been found within the sandstone horizons of Unit A.

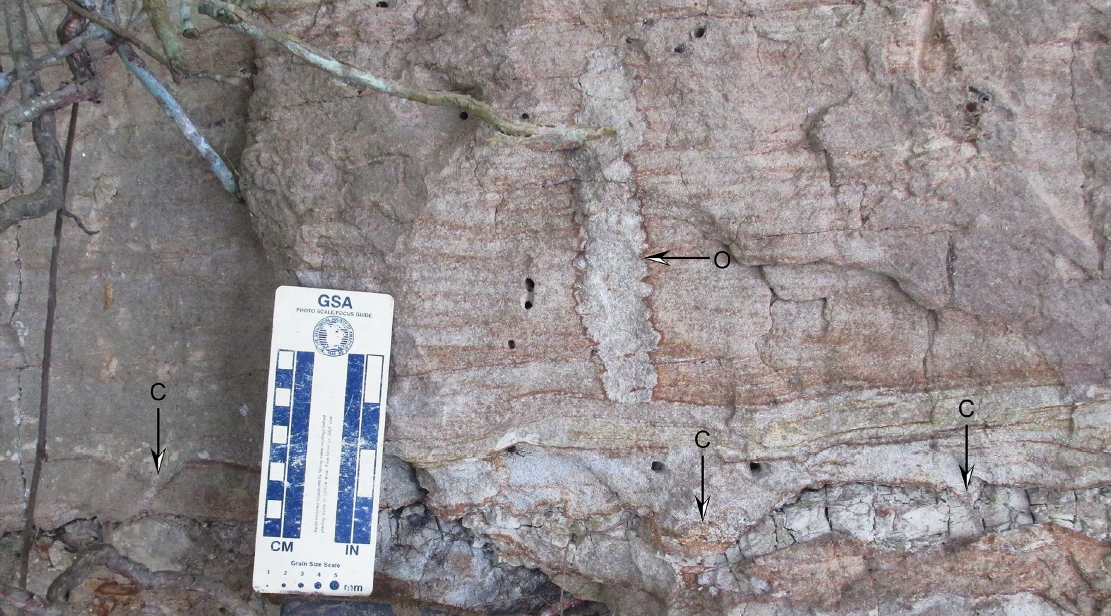
Ichnofossils of the Alajuela Formation: Conichnus (C) and Ophiomorpha (O)

One exposure of Interval 1, within the 9–14 m levels of the composite section, includes a moderately sorted, fine-medium grained tuffaceous sandstone with distinctive mm- to cm thick horizontal bedding and wavy laminations (Unit B). Scour and fill structures with dm-scale widths and occasional mud drapes are present near the erosional contact with the underlying Unit A lithologies. No body fossils are present in this unit, but rare and well-preserved ichnofossils, primarily Conichnus and vertically oriented Ophiomorpha, are preserved that cut across and deform bedding horizons. The infilling of these burrows consists of the same fine tuffaceous sand of overlying horizons.

==== Interval II ====
The base of Interval 2 exhibits a highly irregular, erosional contact with either a poorly sorted, bioturbated sandstone of Unit A lithologies or a laterally discontinuous unit of clast-supported conglomerate (Unit C). This interval typically occurs well above lake levels in the study area and is covered by vegetation. Consequently, continuous fresh exposures exhibiting diagnostic sedimentary structures are relatively rare. The dominant lithology in Interval 2 appears to be a well-cemented, fine-grained litharenite that coarsens upwards into a medium-grained sand, capped by a shell lag horizon of fragmented bivalves and gastropods (Unit D). The density of shell fragments at the top of the coarsening-upwards sequences locally approaches that of a coquina. A minimum of three coarsening-upward sequences is preserved in Interval 2, and although the litharenite appears massive in most exposures, trough cross-bedding and low-angle planar cross-bedding are evident locally.

==== Interval III ====
The base of Interval 3 is marked by a cm-scale gradational contact between an underlying shell lag in Interval 2 and an overlying fine-grained calcareous sandstone with lithics and occasional trough cross-bedding and ripple marks (Unit E). A calcarenite occasionally interbedded with sandy limestone (Unit F) occurs stratigraphically above, separated from the underlying calcareous sandstone by an irregular, erosional contact. Sedimentary structures vary within the calcarenite from trough cross-bedding to wavy bedding to low-angle planar cross-bedding, suggesting substantial changes in flow velocities at the time of deposition. The lithologies in Unit F were originally described by Woodring in 1957 as the Alhajuela Sandstone Member of the Caimito Formation. However, based on the age constraints presented below for the Alajuela Formation, this attribution to the late Oligocene—early Miocene Caimito Formation is no longer supported. The stratigraphic thickness of Interval 3 was not measured in the study by MacFadden et al. (2017), but was reported by Woodring (1957) as being approximately 85 metres (279 ft).

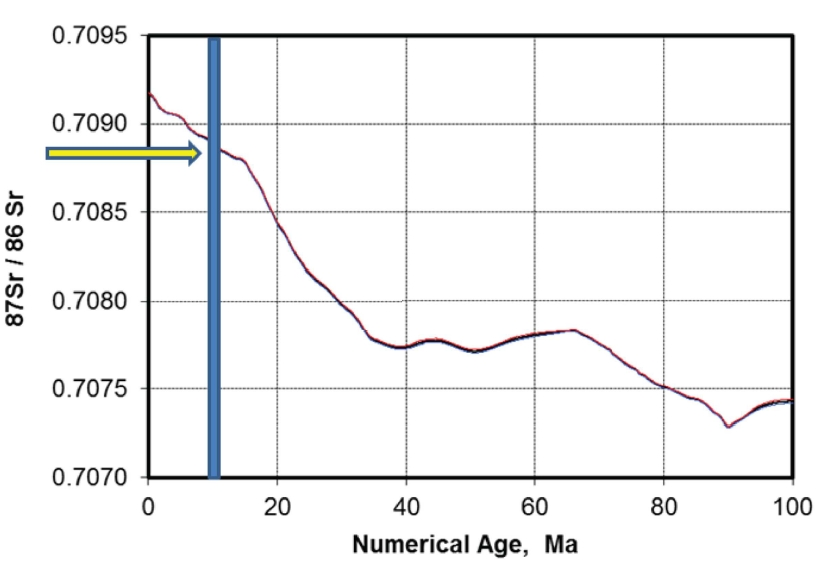
^{87}Sr/^{86}Sr ratios provided an age of 9.77 ± 0.22 Ma for the formation

=== Age ===
Analysis of ^{87}Sr/^{86}Sr ratios, obtained from original shell material from marine fossils, provided an age of 9.77 ± 0.22 Ma for the formation, placing it in the Tortonian. In the commonly used North American land mammal age classification, this corresponds to the earliest Hemphillian, typically starting at 10.3 Ma, although MacFadden et al. correlate this age with the latest Clarendonian. The equivalent South American land mammal age for the estimated age of the Arajuela Formation is Chasicoan.

== Paleontological significance ==
The Alajuela Formation is an important Late Miocene unit, as it represents a faunal and floral assemblage before the Great American Biotic Interchange (GABI), the mainly southward migration of North American biota to South America. The timing of the GABI has been a matter of debate between paleontologists and while some researchers define the GABI in the Early Pliocene (4 to 5 Ma), others observe earlier phases of migration in the Middle Miocene, around 15 to 13 Ma.

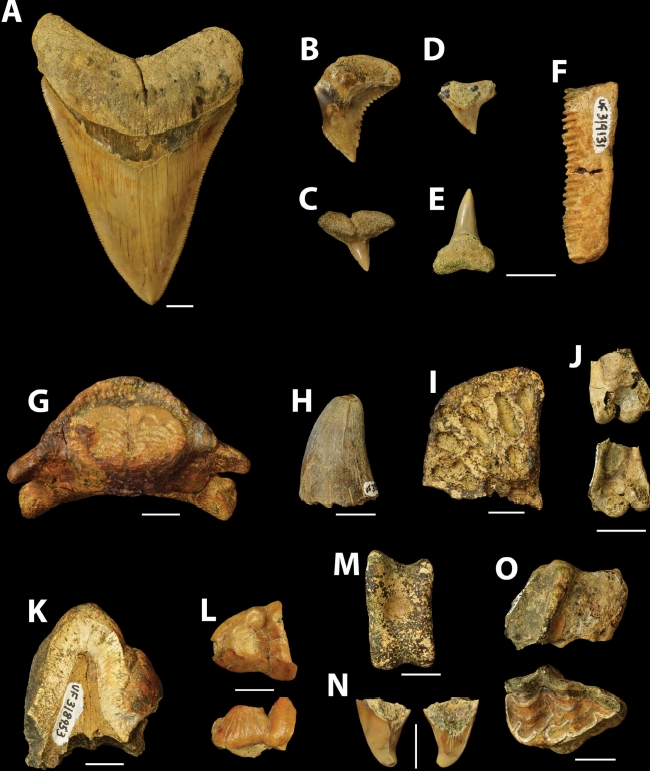
Vertebrate fossils of the Alajuela Formation

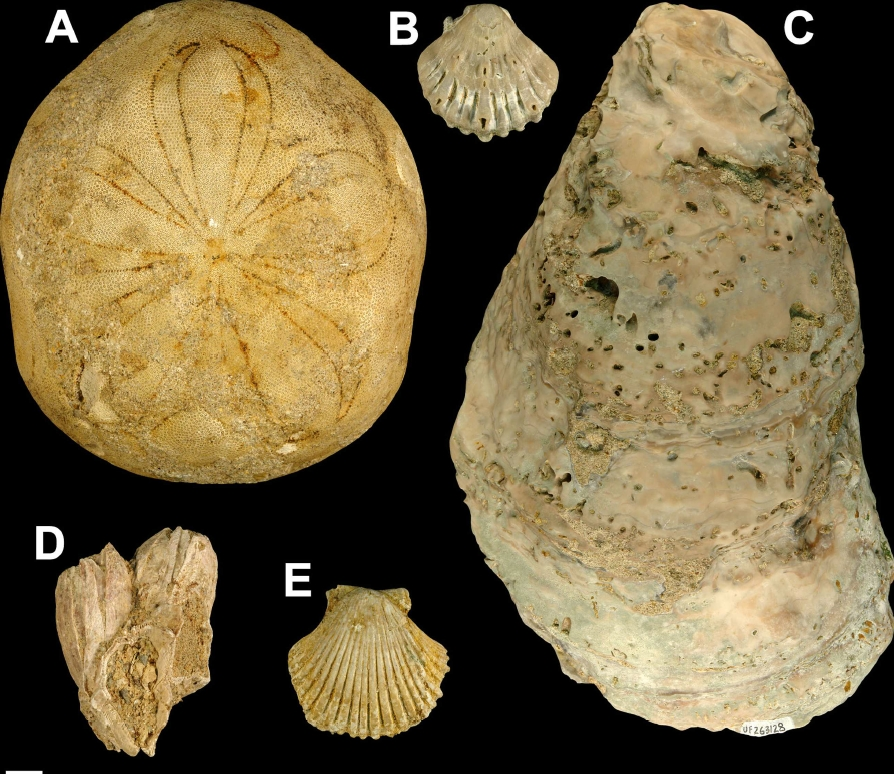
Calcitic fossils of the Alajuela Formation

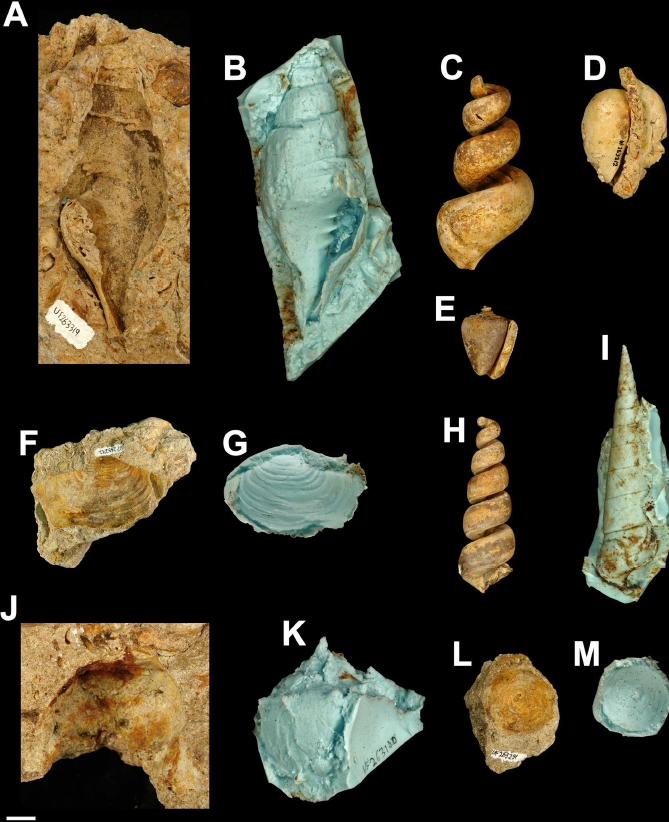
Mollusk mold fossils of the Alajuela Formation

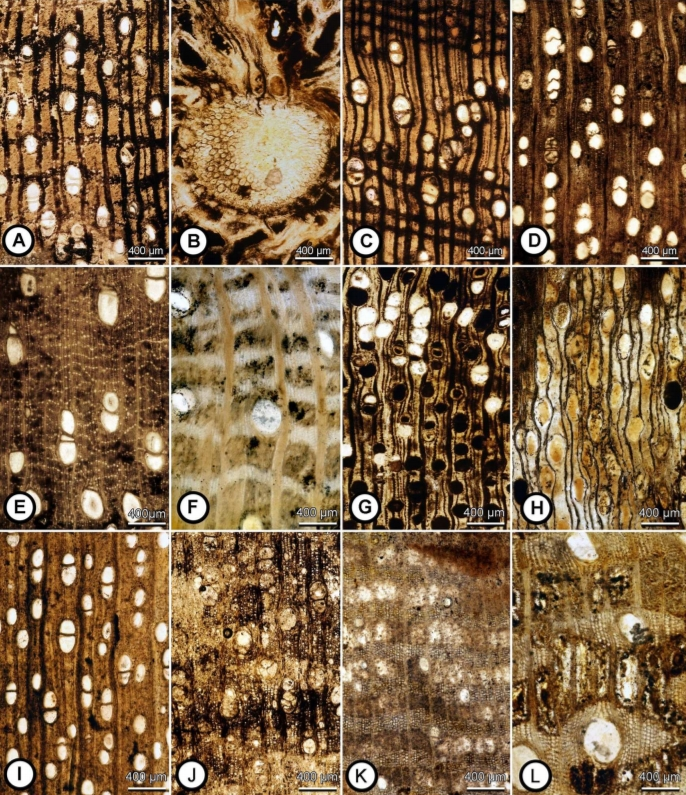
Fossil wood of the Alajuela Formation

The abundance of marine fossils from the Alajuela and Gatún Formations, and the Chucunaque Formation, demonstrates seaway connections existed through central Panama during the Late Miocene. Strontium ratios also suggest the Alajuela Formation overlaps in time with the richly fossiliferous Late Miocene Gatún Formation to the north, with which the Alajuela Formation shares many invertebrate faunal elements.

=== Fossil content ===
The formation has provided a diverse faunal and floral assemblage, with invertebrates as bivalves, gastropods, and echinoids and vertebrate fauna including fish, reptiles and mammals. Fossilized wood fragments occur also in the Alajuela Formation.

Group	Fossils	Notes	Images
Mammals	Gomphotherium sp.		
Mammals	Cormohipparion sp.		
Mammals	Dinohippus sp., cf. Carnivora indet., cf. Dugongidae indet., Tayassuidae indet.		
Birds	Aves indet.		
Reptiles	Bairdemys sp., Cheloniidae indet., Testudinidae indet., Tomistominae indet.		
Fish	megalodon		
Fish	Hemipristis serra		
Fish	Negaprion brevirostris, Sphyrna mokarran, Carcharhinus sp., Myliobatis sp., Pristis sp., Rhinoptera sp.		
Bivalves	Anadara (Tosarca) cf. tectumcolumbae, Argopecten venezuelanus, Dinocardium robustum, Leopecten gatunensis, Macrocallista maculata, Anadara (Rasia) dariensis, Corbula (Varicorbula), Dosinia (Dosinia) aff. ponderosa, Pholadomya falconensis, Atrina sp., Chione (Chionopsis) tegulum, Mytilus canoasensis, Tivela (Tivela) mactroides, Trachycardium (Dallocardia) phlyctaena, Trigoniocardia (Apiocardia) cf. simrothi, ?Diplodonta sp., Panopea sp., Pitar sp., Lindapecten buchivacoanus, Amusium toulae, Arca (Arca) imbricata, Hyotissa haitensis, Nodipecten colinensis, Tucetona pectinata, Lirophora (Lirophora) falconensis, Pecten (Oppenheimopecten) colpotus, Florimetis trinitaria, Lamelliconcha cf. aequicincta, Ventricolaria harrisiana, Anadara (Rasia) cf. fissicosta, Trachycardium (Dallocardia) dominicense, Cyathodonta gatunensis, Dosinia (Dosinia) aff. ponderosa, Dosinia (Dosinia) delicatissima, Panopea parawhitfieldi, Periglypta cf. caribbeana, Semele chipolana, Caryocorbula sp., Hexacorbula sp., Psammacoma sp., Mactridae indet., Solenidae indet.		
Gastropods	Ficus carbesea carbesea, Turritella (Bactrospira) altilira, Crucibulum sp., Malea sp.		
Flora	Panascleroticoxylon, Fabaceae indet., Malvaceae indet., ?Phyllanthaceae indet., Sapindaceae indet.		

== See also ==
- List of fossiliferous stratigraphic units in Panama
- Curré Formation of Costa Rica
- Pebas Formation of northern South America
