= Isla Colón Formation =

Geologic formation in Panama

- Stratigraphic range: Early Pleistocene
- Type: Formation
- Unit of: Bocas del Toro Group
- Sub-units: Ground Creek & La Gruta Members

Lithology
- Primary: Limestone
- Other: Sandstone

Location
- Coordinates: 9.3°N 82.1°W
- Approximate paleocoordinates: 9.2°N 81.8°W
- Region: Bocas del Toro
- Country: Panama

Type section
- Named for: Colón Island
- Isla Colón Formation (Panama)

The Isla Colón Formation is an Early Pleistocene geologic formation in the Bocas del Toro Province of northwestern Panama. It preserves coral fossils. The formation, part of the Bocas del Toro Group, comprises limestones and sandstones deposited in a reefal environment.

== Fossil content ==
- Isophyllia maoensis

== See also ==
- List of fossiliferous stratigraphic units in Panama
