= Caimito Formation =

Geologic formation in Panama

- Stratigraphic range: Late Oligocene-Early Miocene
- Type: Formation
- Underlies: Alajuela & Gatún Formations
- Overlies: Bohío, Caraba & Gatuncillo Formations, Cretaceous basement

Lithology
- Primary: Marl
- Other: Siltstone, sandstone, conglomerate

Location
- Coordinates: 9.2°N 79.8°W
- Approximate paleocoordinates: 7.7°N 77.5°W
- Region: Panamá Province
- Country: Panama
- Extent: Panama Basin

Type section
- Named for: Caimito Junction of Panama Railroad
- Named by: MacDonald
- Year defined: 1913
- Caimito Formation (Panama)

The Caimito Formation (Tcm) is a geologic formation in Panama. The marls, sandstones and conglomerates preserve bivalve and gastropod fossils dating back to the Late Oligocene to Early Miocene period. The name Caimito was proposed by MacDonald in 1913, named after the Caimito junction in the Panama Railroad during the construction of the Panama Canal.

== See also ==
- List of fossiliferous stratigraphic units in Panama
