= Moin Formation =

Costa Rican geologic formation

- Stratigraphic range: Late Pliocene-Early Pleistocene
- Type: Formation
- Unit of: Limón Group
- Sub-units: Empalme, Lomas del Mar, Middle & Santa Rosa Members
- Overlies: Río Banano Formation

Lithology
- Primary: Siltstone, limestone, sandstone, claystone
- Other: Mudstone, grainstone

Location
- Region: Limón Province
- Country: Costa Rica

Type section
- Named for: Moin
- india assam Moin Formation (Costa Rica)

The Moin Formation is a geologic formation in Costa Rica. It preserves fossils dating back to the Late Pliocene to Early Pleistocene period.

== Fossil content ==
- Cataetyx stringeri
- Engina moinensis

== See also ==
- List of fossiliferous stratigraphic units in Costa Rica
