= Punta Judas Formation =

Geologic formation in Costa Rica

- Stratigraphic range: Middle Miocene
- Type: Formation

Location
- Country: Costa Rica

The Punta Judas Formation is a geologic formation in Costa Rica. It preserves fossils dating back to the Middle Miocene period.

== Fossil content ==
- Negaprion eurybathrodon

== See also ==
- List of fossiliferous stratigraphic units in Costa Rica
