= Gracias Formation =

- Stratigraphic range: Miocene
- Type: Formation
- Underlies: Pleistocene basalt
- Overlies: Padre Miguel Group
- Thickness: 200–300 m (660–980 ft)

Lithology
- Primary: Sandstone, siltstone, claystone
- Other: Conglomerate

Location
- Coordinates: 21.2°N 100.7°W
- Approximate paleocoordinates: 21.7°N 98.0°W
- Region: Lempira Department
- Country: Honduras

Type section
- Named for: Gracias
- Named by: Williams & McBirney
- Year defined: 1969
- Gracias Formation (Honduras)

The Gracias Formation is a geologic formation in Honduras. The mainly sandstones, siltstones and claystones preserve vertebrate fossils dating back to the Neogene period.

== Description ==
The Gracias Formation is a sedimentary unit, consisting of sandstone, siltstone, claystone and a few conglomeratic beds. The formation crops out in western Honduras and ranges from 200 to 300 metres (660 to 980 ft) in thickness. The formation overlies the Padre Miguel Group, while it is overlain by Pleistocene basalts. The Padre Miguel Group provided the provenance for the sedimentary material for the Gracias Formation. The clasts in the formation are largely composed of rhyolite, rhyodacite, pumice, vitric ash, quartz, feldspar, and minor biotite fragments.

== Fossil content ==
- Borophagus secundus
- Calippus hondurensis
- Cormohipparion ingenuum
- Procamelus cf. grandis
- Prosthennops cf. serus
- Protolabis cf. heterodontus
- Pseudoceras skinneri
- Rhynchotherium cf. blicki
- Teleoceras sp.
- Rhinocerotidae indet.

== See also ==
- List of fossiliferous stratigraphic units in Honduras
