= Cuscatlán Formation =

- Stratigraphic range: Pliocene-Mid Pleistocene (Blancan-Irvingtonian)
- Type: Formation

Location
- Coordinates: 13.8°N 89.2°W
- Approximate paleocoordinates: 13.9°N 88.9°W
- Region: Cuscatlán
- Country: El Salvador

Type section
- Named for: Cuscatlán Department
- Cuscatlán Formation (El Salvador)

The Cuscatlán Formation is a geologic formation in El Salvador. It preserves fossils dating back to the Pliocene to Middle Pleistocene (Blancan to Irvingtonian) period.

== Fossil content ==
- Borophagus hilli
- Meizonyx salvadorensis
- Megalonyx obtusidens
- cf. Arctotherium sp.
- Cuvieronius sp.
- Eremotherium sp.
- Geochelone sp.
- Mixotoxodon sp.
- Cervidae indet.

== See also ==
- List of fossiliferous stratigraphic units in El Salvador
