= Swan Cay Formation =

Geologic formation in Panama

- Stratigraphic range: Early Pleistocene
- Type: Formation
- Unit of: Bocas del Toro Group

Lithology
- Primary: Sandstone
- Other: Grainstone

Location
- Region: Bocas del Toro
- Country: Panama

Type section
- Named for: Swan Cay

The Swan Cay Formation is a geologic formation in Panama. It preserves fossils.

== Fossil content ==
- Engina moinensis
- Ophidion pauxillicauda

== See also ==
- List of fossiliferous stratigraphic units in Panama
