= Quebrada Chocolate Formation =

Geologic formation in Costa Rica

- Stratigraphic range: Miocene
- Type: Formation
- Unit of: Limón Group

Location
- Country: Costa Rica

The Quebrada Chocolate Formation is a geologic formation in Costa Rica. It preserves fossils dating back to the Neogene period.

== See also ==
- List of fossiliferous stratigraphic units in Costa Rica
