= Chocal Formation =

Geologic formation in Guatemala

- Stratigraphic range: Artinskian-Kungurian
- Type: Formation
- Unit of: Santa Rosa Group

Lithology
- Primary: Limestone

Location
- Coordinates: 15.4°N 91.5°W
- Region: Huehuetenango
- Country: Guatemala
- Extent: Sierra de los Cuchumatanes
- Chocal Formation (Guatemala)

The Chocal Formation is a geologic formation in Guatemala. The limestone formation preserves fossils dating back to the Permian period.

== See also ==
- List of fossiliferous stratigraphic units in Guatemala
