= Esquias Formation =

- Stratigraphic range: Late Albian-Early Turonian
- Type: Formation
- Unit of: Valle de Ángeles Group

Lithology
- Primary: Claystone
- Other: Sandstone

Location
- Coordinates: 14.7°N 87.5°W
- Approximate paleocoordinates: 14.7°N 69.3°W
- Region: Comayagua Department
- Country: Honduras

Type section
- Named for: Esquías
- Esquias Formation (Honduras)

The Esquias Formation is a geologic formation in Honduras. It preserves fossils dating back to the Cretaceous period.

== Fossil content ==
- Iguanodontidae indet.

== See also ==
- List of fossiliferous stratigraphic units in Honduras
