= El Plan Formation =

Geologic formation in Honduras

- Stratigraphic range: Middle Jurassic Bajocian
- Type: Formation

Lithology
- Primary: Sandstone
- Other: Shale

Location
- Coordinates: 14.5°N 87.1°W
- Approximate paleocoordinates: 5.2°S 50.9°W
- Region: Francisco Morazán Department
- Country: Honduras
- El Plan Formation (Honduras)

The El Plan Formation is a geologic formation in Honduras. It preserves fossils probably dating back to the Middle Jurassic period.

== Fossil content ==
- Brachyphyllum hondurense
- Phlebopteris branneri
- Piazopteris branneri
- Equisetum sp.
- Zamites sp.

== See also ==
- List of fossiliferous stratigraphic units in Honduras
