= Limón Group =

- Stratigraphic range: Late Miocene-Early Pleistocene
- Type: Group
- Sub-units: Moin, Río Banano, Uscari & Quebrada Chocolate Formations

Lithology
- Primary: Siltstone, sandstone, claystone
- Other: Mudstone, limestone

Location
- Coordinates: 9.9°N 83.1°W
- Approximate paleocoordinates: 9.8°N 83.2°W
- Region: Limón Province
- Country: Costa Rica

Type section
- Named for: Limón Province
- Limón Group (Costa Rica)

The Limón Group is a geologic group in Costa Rica. It preserves fossils dating back to the Late Miocene to Early Pleistocene period.

== Stratigraphy ==
The Limón Group is subdivided into:

- Moin Formation
- Río Banano Formation
- Uscari Formation
- Quebrada Chocolate Formation

== See also ==
- List of fossiliferous stratigraphic units in Costa Rica
