= Panama Formation =

Geologic formation in Panama

- Stratigraphic range: Late Oligocene
- Type: Formation
- Underlies: Caraba Formation
- Overlies: Gatuncillo Formation, Cretaceous basement

Lithology
- Primary: Sandstone, shale, conglomerate
- Other: Tuff, limestone

Location
- Coordinates: 9.1°N 79.7°W
- Approximate paleocoordinates: 7.6°N 77.3°W
- Region: Panamá Province
- Country: Panama
- Extent: Panama Basin

Type section
- Named for: Panama
- Panama Formation (Panama)

The Panama Formation (Tp) is a geologic formation in Panama. The formation consists of tuffaceous sandstones, conglomerates, tuffaceous shales and algal and foraminifera-rich limestones, and preserves bivalve fossils of Leopecten gatunensis and Nodipecten sp. and dates back to the Late Oligocene period.

== See also ==
- List of fossiliferous stratigraphic units in Panama
