= Bocas del Toro Group =

- Stratigraphic range: Serravallian-Early Pleistocene
- Type: Group
- Sub-units: Swan Cay, Isla Colón, Escudo de Veraguas, Cayo Agua, Shark Hole Point, Nancy Point & Valiente Formations

Lithology
- Primary: Sandstone, siltstone, limestone

Location
- Coordinates: 9.1°N 82.0°W
- Approximate paleocoordinates: 9.1°N 81.7°W
- Region: Bocas del Toro Province
- Country: Panama

Type section
- Named for: Bocas del Toro
- Bocas del Toro Group (Panama)

The Bocas del Toro Group is a geologic group in Panama. It preserves fossils dating back to the Serravallian to Early Pleistocene period. The group comprises the Swan Cay, Isla Colón, Escudo de Veraguas, Cayo Agua, Shark Hole Point, Nancy Point and Valiente Formations.

== See also ==
- List of fossiliferous stratigraphic units in Panama
