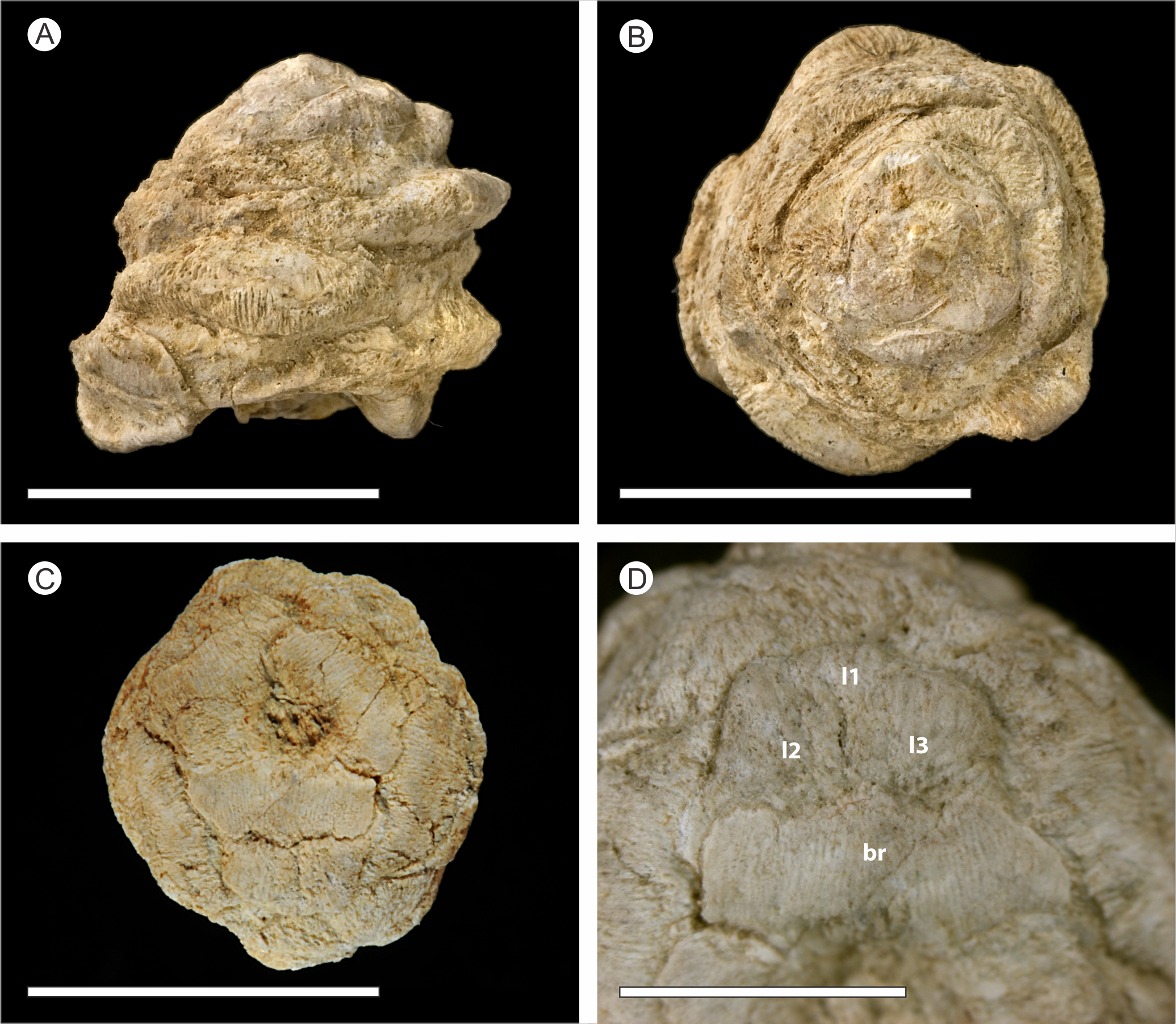
- Fossil of Pararaucaria collinsonae

Scientific classification
- Kingdom: Plantae
- Clade: Tracheophytes
- Clade: Gymnospermae
- Division: Pinophyta
- Class: Pinopsida
- Order: Pinales
- Family: †Cheirolepidiaceae
- Genus: †Pararaucaria; Wieland emend. Escapa, Rothwell, Stockey et Cuneo, 2012

Species
- See text

= Pararaucaria =

Pararaucaria Temporal range: Early Jurassic–Early Cretaceous

Extinct genus of conifer cones

Pararaucaria is a genus of conifer cone belonging to the extinct family Cheirolepidiaceae. Fossils are known from the Lower Jurassic to Early Cretaceous of North America, Europe, South America and Asia. It is associated with Brachyphyllum-type foliage.

== Description ==
The form of the cone varies from cylindrical to spherical, reaching up to 80 millimetres (3.1 in) in length in the largest species. The bract-scale complexes are helically arranged around the core. There is one central undivided and two lateral ovuliferous scale lobes, with each ovuliferous scale bearing one or two seeds, which are up to 11 by 5 millimetres (0.43 in × 0.20 in) in dimension. The seeds are enclosed within pocket forming tissue.

== Taxonomy ==
The genus was originally described by Wieland in 1929 and 1935 for the species Pararaucaria patagonica. The affinity of the genus was originally uncertain, but was confidently referred to the Cheirolepidiaceae by a study conducted in 2012, which emended the diagnosis of the genus.

=== Species ===
- Pararaucaria laiyangensis Jin et al. 2023 Laiyang Formation, Shangdong, China, Early Cretaceous (Hauterivian–Barremian)
- Pararaucaria patagonica Wieland emend. Escapa, Rothwell, Stockey et Cuneo, 2012 (type) La Matilde Formation, Argentina, Middle Jurassic
- Pararaucaria delfueyoi Escapa et al. 2012 Cañadón Calcáreo Formation, Argentina, Late Jurassic
- Pararaucaria carrii Stockey and Rothwell, 2014 Trowbridge Formation, Oregon, United States, Middle Jurassic (Callovian)
- Pararaucaria collinsonae Steart et al., 2014 Purbeck Group, England, Late Jurassic (Tithonian)
- Pararaucaria taquetrensis Escapa et Leslie, 2017 Lonco Trapial Group, Argentina, Early Jurassic

An indeterminate species is also known from the Late Jurassic Morrison Formation, of Utah, USA.

=== Associations ===
Pararaucaria is associated with foliage of Brachyphyllum type,
