= Charco Azul Group =

Geologic formation group in Costa Rica and Panama

- Stratigraphic range: Early Pliocene-Early Pleistocene
- Type: Group
- Sub-units: Armuelles, Penita & Charco Azul Formations

Lithology
- Primary: Shale, conglomerate
- Other: Siltstone, sandstone

Location
- Coordinates: 8.2°N 83.0°W
- Approximate paleocoordinates: 8.1°N 82.5°W
- Region: Puntarenas Province, Chiriquí Province
- Country: Costa Rica, Panama
- Extent: Burica Peninsula

Type section
- Named for: Charco Azul

The Charco Azul Group is a geologic group in southeastern Costa Rica and western Panama. The group comprises the Armuelles, Penita and Charco Azul Formations and preserves fossils.

== See also ==
- List of fossiliferous stratigraphic units in Costa Rica
- List of fossiliferous stratigraphic units in Panama
