= Ixcoy Formation =

Geologic formation in Guatemala

- Stratigraphic range: Aptian-Maastrichtian
- Type: Formation

Lithology
- Primary: Limestone

Location
- Coordinates: 15.8°N 91.3°W
- Approximate paleocoordinates: 24.6°N 80.8°W
- Region: Huehuetenango Department
- Country: Guatemala
- Extent: Guatemalan Highlands

Type section
- Named for: San Juan Ixcoy
- Ixcoy Formation (Guatemala)

The Ixcoy Formation is a geologic formation in Guatemala. It preserves fossils dating back to the Cretaceous period. The upper part of the Ixcoy Formation is laterally equivalent with the Campur Formation of the Petén Basin in northern Guatemala.

== Fossil content ==
The following fossils have been uncovered from the formation:

- Biradiolites jamaicensis
- Chubbina jamaicensis
- Praeradiolites cf. verseyi
- Senalveolina aubouini
- Thyrastylon adhaerens
- Texicaprina cf. orbiculata
- Chondrodonta sp.
- ?Planocaprina sp.

== See also ==
- List of fossiliferous stratigraphic units in Guatemala
