= Valle de Ángeles Redbeds =

- Stratigraphic range: Late Albian-Early Cenomanian; ~102–98 Ma
- Type: Geological formation
- Unit of: Valle de Ángeles Group
- Underlies: Guanaco Formation
- Thickness: 450 m (1,480 ft)

Lithology
- Primary: Sandstone, claystone
- Other: Conglomerate

Location
- Coordinates: 14.43°N 88.95°W
- Region: Ocotepeque Department
- Country: Honduras

Type section
- Named for: Valle de Ángeles
- Valle de Ángeles Redbeds (Honduras)

The Valle de Ángeles Redbeds (Kva) is a Late Albian to Early Cenomanian geologic formation of the in western Honduras. Dinosaur remains are among the fossils that have been recovered from the formation, although none have yet been referred to a specific genus.

== Description ==
The Valle de Angeles Formation comprises claystones, sandstones and quartz- and shale-rich conglomerates. The formation has a thickness of 450 metres (1,480 ft) and dates to the Late Albian to Early Cenomanian. The formation is overlain by the Guanaco Formation.

== Fossil content ==
Color key: Taxon / Reclassified taxon / Taxon falsely reported as present / Dubious taxon or junior synonym / Ichnotaxon / Ootaxon / Morphotaxon	Notes; Uncertain or tentative taxa are in small text; ~~crossed out~~ taxa are discredited.

=== Dinosaurs ===
==== Ornithischians ====
Ornithischians of the Valle de Ángeles Redbeds
Genus	Species	Location	Stratigraphic position	Material	Notes	Images
Ornithopoda indet.	Indeterminate	Ocotepeque Department, Honduras	Albian to Cenomanian	Femur	An indeterminate ornithopod	

== See also ==
- List of dinosaur-bearing rock formations
  - List of stratigraphic units with indeterminate dinosaur fossils
- List of fossiliferous stratigraphic units in Honduras
