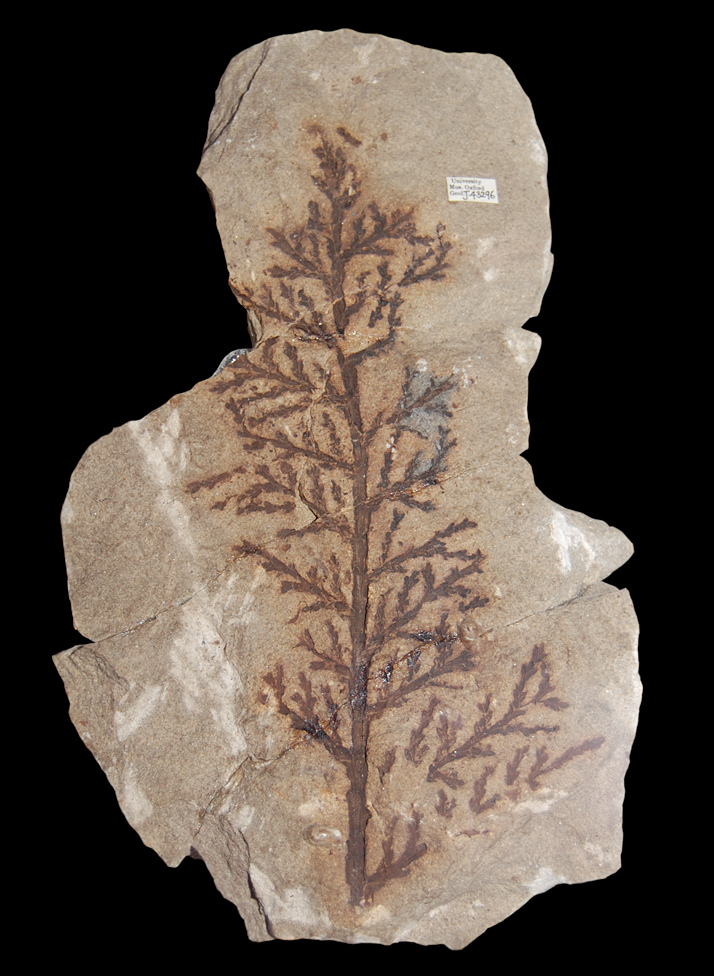

Scientific classification
- Kingdom: Plantae
- Clade: Tracheophytes
- Clade: Gymnospermae
- Division: Pinophyta
- Class: Pinopsida
- Order: Pinales
- Family: †Cheirolepidiaceae
- Genus: †Brachyphyllum; A. T. Brongniart 1828

Species
- See text

= Brachyphyllum =

Brachyphyllum Temporal range: Carboniferous-Late Cretaceous ~300–66 Ma

Extinct genus of conifers

Brachyphyllum (meaning "short leaf") is a form genus of fossil coniferous plant foliage. Plants of the genus have been variously assigned to several different conifer groups including Araucariaceae and Cheirolepidiaceae. They are known from around the globe from the Late Carboniferous to the Late Cretaceous periods.

== List of species ==
- †B. yorkense
- †B. castatum
- †B. castilhoi
- †B. hondurense
- †B. mamillare
- †B. punctatum
- †B. sattlerae named after the fictional palaebotanist Ellie Sattler from the Jurassic Park franchise.
- †B. japonicum
- †B. dimorpha

== Location of palaeontological sites ==
- In Paleorrota geopark in Brazil; Upper Triassic period, the Caturrita Formation
- The Caballos Formation of Tolima, Colombia
- The El Plan Formation of the Department of Francisco Morazan, Honduras
- The Crato Formation of Brazil
- The Hasandong Formation and Jinju Formation of South Korea
- The Otlaltepec Formation in Mexico

== Correspondence with other plant elements ==
Amongst Cheirolepidiaceae, Brachyphyllum is known to be associated with the conifer cones Pararaucaria and Kachaikestrobus. Whilst amongst the Araucariaceae, it has been associated with the pollen cone Rabagostrobus, and the confier cone Arauacarites.
