= Campur Formation =

Geologic formation in Guatemala

- Stratigraphic range: Turonian-Maastrichtian
- Type: Formation
- Underlies: Petén Group: Sepur Formation
- Overlies: Cobán Formation

Lithology
- Primary: Limestone
- Other: Dolomite, conglomerate, siltstone

Location
- Coordinates: 16.0°N 90.5°W
- Approximate paleocoordinates: 24.2°N 80.1°W
- Region: Alta Verapaz, Petén
- Country: Guatemala
- Extent: Petén Basin

Type section
- Named for: Campur
- Named by: Vinson
- Year defined: 1962
- Campur Formation (Guatemala)

The Campur Formation (Kca) is a geologic formation of the Petén Basin of northern Guatemala. The subtidal limestone preserves fossils dating back to the Late Cretaceous period.

== Description ==
The formation consists of fossiliferous limestones with minor levels of dolomites. The formation is rich in rudists and miliolids. Breccias and clayey conglomerates, siltstones and limestones occur in the formation. The formation was probably deposited in a fore-reef environment in an open shelf system. The lower boundary of the Campur Formation is transitional into the underlying Cobán Formation. The formation is overlain by the Sepur Formation of the Petén Group. The Campur Formation is laterally equivalent with the upper part of the Ixcoy Formation of western Guatemala.

== Fossil content ==
The following fossils have been uncovered from the formation:

- Accordiella cf. conica
- Bournonia cardenasensis, B. excavata
- Distefanella lombricalis
- Senalveolina aubouini
- Sulcoperculina sp.

== See also ==
- List of fossiliferous stratigraphic units in Guatemala
