= Armuelles Formation =

Costa Rican geological formation

- Stratigraphic range: Early Pleistocene
- Type: Formation
- Unit of: Charco Azul Group
- Overlies: Penita & Charco Azul Formations

Lithology
- Primary: Siltstone
- Other: Sandstone, conglomerate

Location
- Region: Limón Province, Chiriquí Province
- Country: Costa Rica, Panama

Type section
- Named for: Puerto Armuelles

The Armuelles Formation is a geologic formation in Costa Rica and Panama. It preserves fossils.

== Fossil content ==
- Axelella nutrita - Panama

== See also ==
- List of fossiliferous stratigraphic units in Costa Rica
- List of fossiliferous stratigraphic units in Panama
