= Tobabe Formation =

Geologic formation in Panama

- Stratigraphic range: Messinian
- Type: Formation

Lithology
- Primary: Conglomerate
- Other: Sandstone

Location
- Coordinates: 9.1°N 81.8°W
- Approximate paleocoordinates: 8.9°N 80.9°W
- Region: Bocas del Toro
- Country: Panama

Type section
- Named for: Tobabe
- Tobabe Formation (Panama)

The Tobabe Formation is a geologic formation in Panama. The conglomerates and sandstones preserve fossils dating back to the Messinian period.

== Fossil content ==
The formation has provided the following fossils:

- Hepatus biformis
- Iliacantha panamanica
- Leucosilia bananensis
- Portunus gabbi
- Raninoides cf. benedicti
- Thoe asperoides
- ?Balaenopteroidea indet.

== See also ==
- List of fossiliferous stratigraphic units in Panama
