= Gatuncillo Formation =

- Stratigraphic range: Middle-Late Eocene
- Type: Formation
- Underlies: Caimito, Bohío & Panama Formations
- Overlies: Cretaceous basement
- Thickness: 150–800 m (490–2,620 ft)

Lithology
- Primary: Mudstone, siltstone
- Other: Limestone, sandstone, conglomerate

Location
- Coordinates: 9.3°N 79.7°W
- Approximate paleocoordinates: 6.8°N 77.3°W
- Region: Panamá Province
- Country: Panama
- Extent: Panama Basin

Type section
- Named for: Gatuncillo River
- Named by: Thompson
- Year defined: 1944
- Gatuncillo Formation (Panama)

The Gatuncillo Formation (Tgo) is a geologic formation in central Panama. The formation is exposed in the Panama Canal Zone and surrounding areas. It preserves fossils dating back to the Middle to Late Eocene period.

== Description ==
The Gatuncillo Formation is the oldest sedimentary unit of the Panama Canal Zone, unconformably resting on Cretaceous basement. The formation was defined as Gatuncillo Shale by Thompson in 1944, who named it after the Gatuncillo River. The estimated thickness ranges from 150 to 800 metres (490 to 2,620 ft).

Though the Gatuncillo consists chiefly of mudstone and siltstone, it includes bentonitic mudstone, sandstone, and limestone, and at the base a conglomerate of variable thickness.

== Fossil content ==
- Zamia nelliae
- Podocnemididae indet.

== See also ==
- List of fossiliferous stratigraphic units in Panama
