= Nancy Point Formation =

Geologic formation in Panama

- Stratigraphic range: Messinian
- Type: Formation
- Unit of: Bocas del Toro Group
- Underlies: Shark Hole Point Formation
- Overlies: Valiente Formation

Lithology
- Primary: Siltstone
- Other: Sandstone

Location
- Coordinates: 9.1°N 82.0°W
- Approximate paleocoordinates: 9.0°N 81.0°W
- Region: Bocas del Toro
- Country: Panama

Type section
- Named for: Nancy Point
- Nancy Point Formation (Panama)

The Nancy Point Formation is a geologic formation in Panama. It preserves fossils dating back to the Miocene period.

== Fossil content ==
- Admetula valientensis
- Cancellaria pilula
- Diaphus apalus, D. depressifrons, D. multiserratus
- Lobianchia johnfitchi
- Massyla corpulenta

== See also ==
- List of fossiliferous stratigraphic units in Panama
