= Ambergris Caye Limestone =

Geologic formation in Belize

- Stratigraphic range: Late Pleistocene
- Type: Formation

Lithology
- Primary: Limestone

Location
- Coordinates: 18.1°N 87.8°W
- Country: Belize

Type section
- Named for: Ambergris Caye
- Ambergris Caye Limestone (Belize)

The Ambergris Caye Limestone is a geologic formation in Belize. It preserves fossils dated to the Late Pleistocene age.

== See also ==
- List of fossiliferous stratigraphic units in Belize
