= Barra Honda Formation =

Geologic formation in Costa Rica

- Stratigraphic range: Late Paleocene
- Type: Formation

Location
- Country: Costa Rica

The Barra Honda Formation is a geologic formation in Costa Rica. It preserves fossils and microfossils dating back to the Paleogene period.

== See also ==
- List of fossiliferous stratigraphic units in Costa Rica
