= Mount Hope Formation =

Geologic formation in Panama

- Stratigraphic range: Early Pleistocene
- Type: Formation

Lithology
- Primary: Limestone
- Other: Siltstone, mudstone

Location
- Coordinates: 9.3°N 79.9°W
- Approximate paleocoordinates: 9.3°N 79.6°W
- Region: Colón Province
- Country: Panama
- Extent: Panama Basin

Type section
- Named for: Mount Hope Cemetery
- Mount Hope Formation (Panama)

The Mount Hope Formation is a geologic formation of the Caribbean mouth of the Panama Canal Zone in Panama. The limestones, mudstones and siltstones preserve bivalve, gastropod (Monoplex comptus) and crustacean fossils dating to the Early Pleistocene. The formation is named after Mount Hope Cemetery, the burial ground for black West Indian immigrants who died working on the intercontinental Panama Railroad at the Panama Canal for the American Panamanian Railroad Corporation between 1850 and 1855.

== See also ==
- List of fossiliferous stratigraphic units in Panama
