= Paso Real Formation, Costa Rica =

Paso Real Formation
- Stratigraphic range: Late Pliocene-Early Pleistocene
- Type: Formation

Lithology
- Primary: Sandstone, conglomerate

Location
- Coordinates: 8.9°N 83.1°W
- Approximate paleocoordinates: 8.9°N 83.1°W
- Region: Puntarenas Province
- Country: Costa Rica
- Paso Real Formation, Costa Rica (Costa Rica)

The Paso Real Formation is a geologic formation in Puntarenas Province, Costa Rica. The sandstones and conglomerates preserve vertebrate fossils dating back to the Late Pliocene to Early Pleistocene period.

== Fossil content ==
The following fossils have been found in the formation:

- Rhynchotherium blicki
- Crocodylus sp.
- Equus sp.
- Eremotherium sp.
- Holmesina sp.
- Pampatherium sp.
- Camelidae indet.
- Gomphotheriidae indet.
- Testudines indet.

== See also ==
- List of fossiliferous stratigraphic units in Costa Rica
