= Burica Sandstone =

Geologic formation in Costa Rica

- Stratigraphic range: Early Pliocene
- Type: Formation

Location
- Country: Costa Rica

The Burica Sandstone is a geologic formation in Costa Rica. It preserves fossils dating back to the Neogene period.

== See also ==
- List of fossiliferous stratigraphic units in Costa Rica
