= Cayo Agua Formation =

Geologic formation in Panama

- Stratigraphic range: Zanclean-Piacenzian
- Type: Formation
- Unit of: Bocas del Toro Group

Lithology
- Primary: Sandstone
- Other: Siltstone

Location
- Region: Bocas del Toro
- Country: Panama

Type section
- Named for: Cayo Agua

The Cayo Agua Formation is a geologic formation in Panama. It preserves fossils dating back to the Pliocene period.

== Fossil content ==
- Aphera trophis
- Cancellaria axelolssoni, C. isabelae
- Diaphus depressifrons
- Umbrina bananensis, U. sublima

== See also ==
- List of fossiliferous stratigraphic units in Panama
