= Caraba Formation =

Geologic formation in Panama

- Stratigraphic range: Early Oligocene
- Type: Formation
- Underlies: Las Cascadas & Caimito Formations
- Overlies: Bas Obispo, Bohío & Panama Formations

Lithology
- Primary: Sandstone
- Other: Conglomerate

Location
- Coordinates: 9.1°N 79.7°W
- Approximate paleocoordinates: 7.1°N 77.5°W
- Region: Panamá Province
- Country: Panama
- Extent: Panama Basin

Type section
- Named by: Jones
- Year defined: 1950
- Caraba Formation (Panama)

The Caraba Formation (Tcr) is a geologic formation in Panama. The formation was first defined in 1950 by Jones as a facies member of the Caimito Formation. The formation consists of poorly lithified, pebbly, tuffaceous, calcareous sandstones and conglomerates and preserves fossils dating back to the Early Oligocene period.

== Fossil content ==
The following fossils have been reported from the formation:

Bivalves

- Leopecten gatunensis
- ?Argopecten sp.

Gastropods

- Pachycrommium trinitatensis
- Ficus sp.

== See also ==
- List of fossiliferous stratigraphic units in Panama
