= Jama Formation =

Geological feature in Ecuador

- Stratigraphic range: Pliocene-Early Pleistocene (Montehermosan-Ensenadan); ~5.3–0.8 Ma
- Type: Geological formation

Lithology
- Primary: Claystone, sandstone

Location
- Coordinates: 0.2°S 80.3°W
- Approximate paleocoordinates: 0.3°S 79.9°W
- Region: Manabí Province
- Country: Ecuador

Type section
- Named for: Jama
- Jama Formation (Ecuador)

The Jama Formation is a Pliocene to Early Pleistocene (Montehermosan to Ensenadan in the SALMA classification) geological formation in Ecuador. The claystones and sandstones were deposited in a coastal environment. The age of the Jama Formation is constrained by ^{40}Ar/^{39}Ar dating of tephra beds. The formation is correlated to the Charco Azul Formation of western Panama and southeastern Costa Rica.

== Subdivision ==
The formation is subdivided in, from top to base:

- El Matal Member (60 metres (200 ft), fluvial)
- Punta Ballena Member (lower shoreface)
- Punta Pasa Borracho Member (20 metres (66 ft), marine)

== Fossil content ==
The formation has provided bivalve, gastropod and scaphopod fossils.

== See also ==
- List of fossiliferous stratigraphic units in Ecuador
