= Tonosí Formation =

- Stratigraphic range: Priabonian (Chadronian); ~38–34 Ma
- Type: Formation

Lithology
- Primary: Sandstone

Location
- Coordinates: 7.4°N 80.4°W
- Approximate paleocoordinates: 0.8°N 104.2°W
- Region: Los Santos Province
- Country: Panama

Type section
- Named for: Tonosí
- Tonosí Formation (Panama)

The Tonosí Formation is a geologic formation in Panama. It preserves fossils dating back to the Paleogene period (Priabonian).

== Fossil content ==
Among others, the formation has provided fossils of:

- Harrisianella sp.

== See also ==
- List of fossiliferous stratigraphic units in Panama
