= Valiente Formation =

Geologic formation in Panama

- Stratigraphic range: Serravallian
- Type: Formation
- Unit of: Bocas del Toro Group
- Underlies: Nancy Point Formation

Location
- Coordinates: 9.2°N 82.1°W
- Approximate paleocoordinates: 8.8°N 80.3°W
- Region: Bocas del Toro
- Country: Panama

Type section
- Named for: Valiente Peninsula
- Valiente Formation (Panama)

The Valiente Formation is a geologic formation of the Bocas del Toro Group in the Bocas del Toro Province of northwestern Panama. The formation underlies the Nancy Point Formation and preserves bivalve, gastropod and scaphopod fossils dating back to the Serravallian period.

== See also ==
- List of fossiliferous stratigraphic units in Panama
