= El Salto Formation, Nicaragua =

Geologic formation in Nicaragua

El Salto Formation
- Stratigraphic range: Early Pliocene
- Type: Formation

Lithology
- Primary: Shale
- Other: Sandstone

Location
- Coordinates: 11.8°N 86.4°W
- Approximate paleocoordinates: 11.9°N 86.1°W
- Region: Managua Department
- Country: Nicaragua
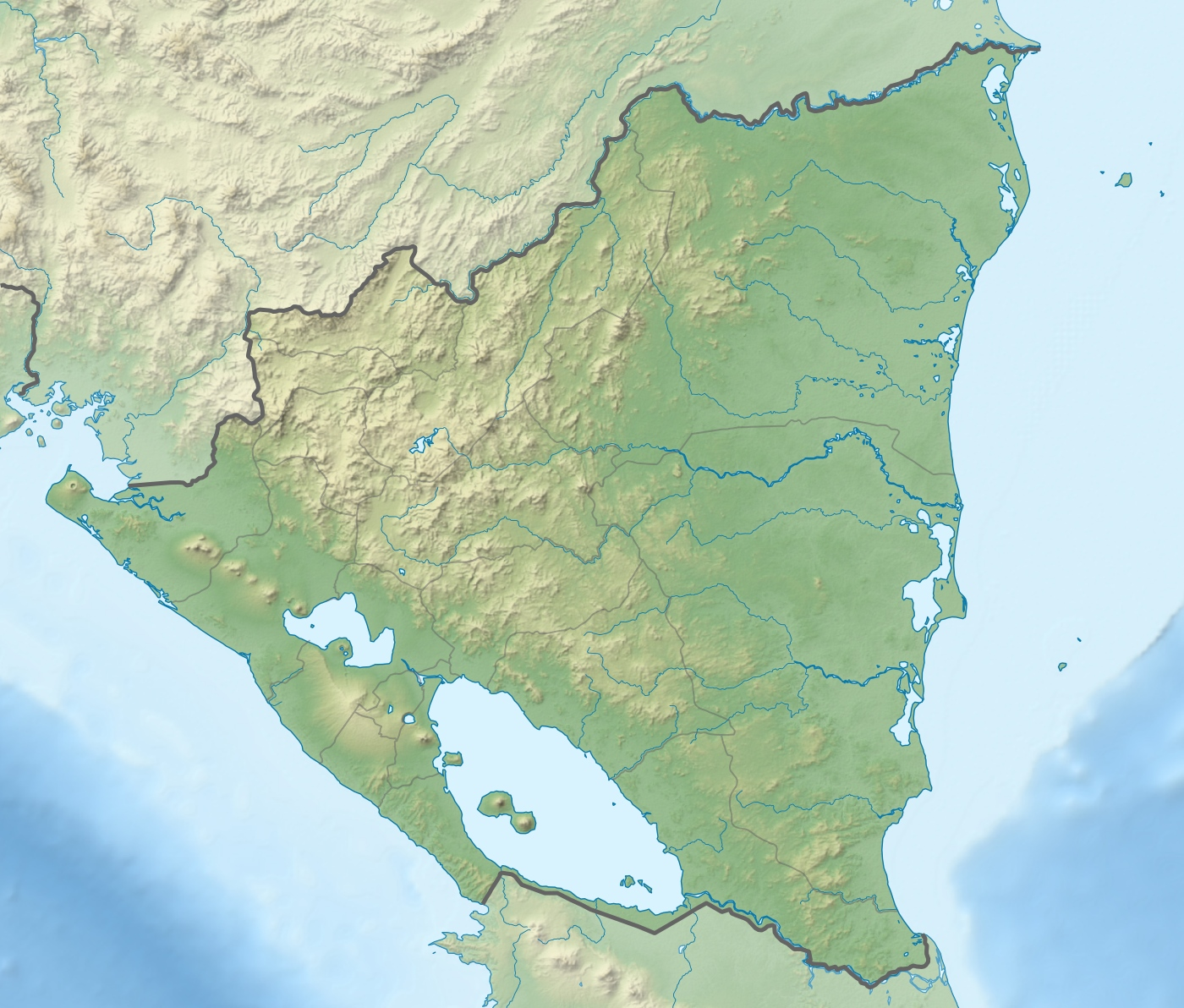
- El Salto Formation, Nicaragua (Nicaragua)

The El Salto Formation is a geologic formation in Nicaragua. It preserves fossils dating back to the Pliocene period.

== Fossil content ==
- Mysticeti indet.

== See also ==
- List of fossiliferous stratigraphic units in Nicaragua
