= Shark Hole Point Formation =

Geologic formation in Panama

- Stratigraphic range: Zanclean-Piacenzian
- Type: Formation
- Unit of: Bocas del Toro Group
- Underlies: Escudo de Veraguas Formation
- Overlies: Nancy Point Formation

Lithology
- Primary: Siltstone

Location
- Coordinates: 9.0°N 81.7°W
- Approximate paleocoordinates: 9.3°N 81.3°W
- Region: Bocas del Toro
- Country: Panama

Type section
- Named for: Shark Hole Point
- Shark Hole Point Formation (Panama)

The Shark Hole Point Formation is a geologic formation in Bocas del Toro Province of northwestern Panama. The siltstones preserve fossils dating back to the Pliocene period.

== Fossil content ==
- Diaphus depressifrons, D. paxtoni

== See also ==
- List of fossiliferous stratigraphic units in Panama
