= Limónes Formation =

Geologic formation in Costa Rica

- Stratigraphic range: Late Miocene
- Type: Formation

Location
- Country: Costa Rica

The Limónes Formation is a geologic formation in Costa Rica. It preserves fossils dating back to the Neogene period.

== See also ==
- List of fossiliferous stratigraphic units in Costa Rica
