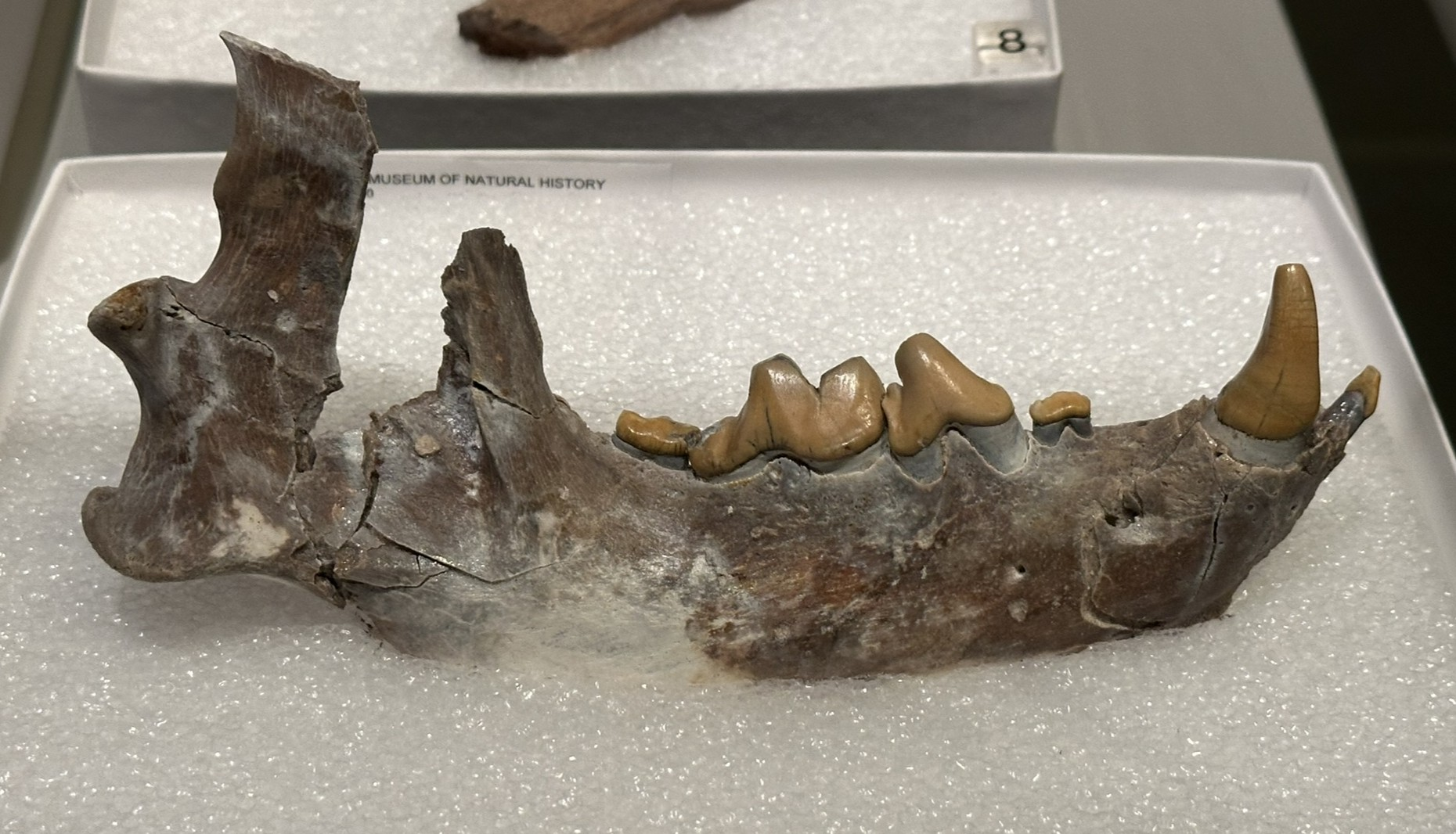
- Fossil jaw, Florida Museum of Natural History

Scientific classification
- Kingdom: Animalia
- Phylum: Chordata
- Class: Mammalia
- Infraclass: Placentalia
- Order: Carnivora
- Suborder: Caniformia
- Family: Canidae
- Genus: †Borophagus
- Species: †B. hilli

Binomial name
- †Borophagus hilli C. S. Johnston 1939

Synonyms
- Borophagus crassapineatus Olsen 1956; Osteoborus crassapineatus Olsen 1956; Osteoborus progressus Hibbard 1944

= Borophagus hilli =

Borophagus hilli Temporal range: ~10.3–1.8 Ma Late Miocene - Early Pleistocene

Extinct species of carnivore

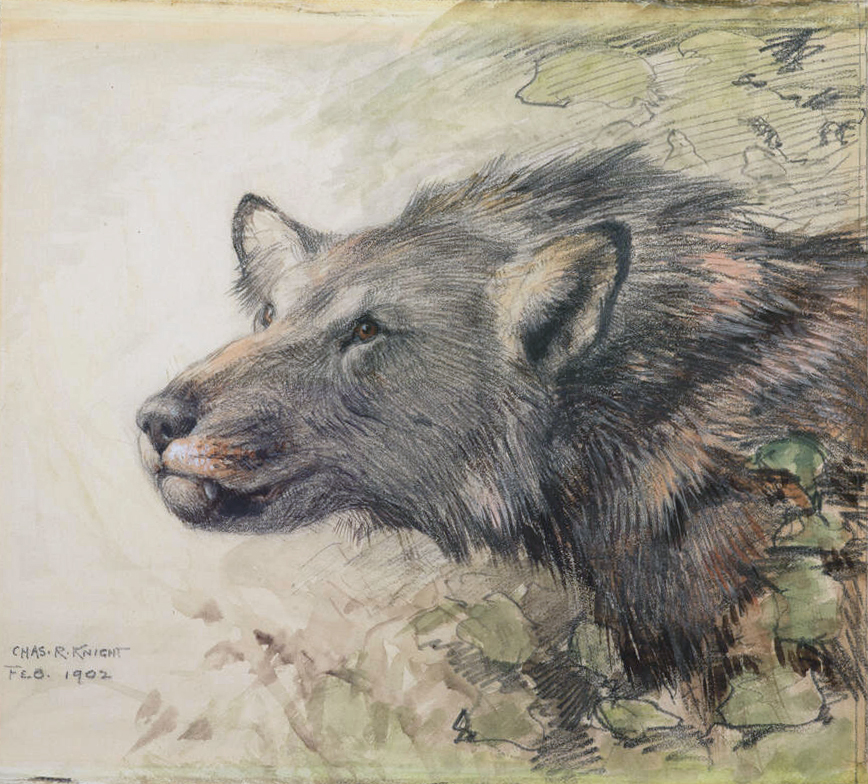
Reconstruction of Borophagus by Charles R. Knight, 1902

Borophagus hilli is an extinct species of the genus Borophagus of the subfamily Borophaginae, a group of canids endemic to North America from the Late Miocene until the Early Pleistocene.

== Overview ==
Borophagus hilli was named by C. S. Johnston in 1939. Though not the most massive borophagine by size or weight, it had a more highly evolved capacity to crunch bone than earlier, larger genera such as Epicyon, which seems to be an evolutionary trend of the group (Turner, 2004). During the Pliocene epoch, Borophagus began being displaced by Canis genera such as Canis edwardii and later by Aenocyon dirus. Early species of Borophagus were placed in the genus Osteoborus until recently, but the genera are now considered synonyms. Borophagus hilli possibly led a hyena-like lifestyle scavenging carcasses of recently dead animals.

== Taxonomy ==
Typical features of this genus are a bulging forehead and powerful jaws; it was probably a scavenger and a predator. Its crushing premolar teeth and strong jaw muscles would have been used to crack open bone, much like the hyena of the Old World. The adult animal is estimated to have been about 80 cm in length, similar to a coyote, although it was much more powerfully built.

== Recombination ==
Borophagus hilli was synonymized subjectively with Borophagus direptor by Kurten and Anderson in 1980 as well as synonymous with Osteoborus crassapineatus, Osteoborus progressus. It was recombined as Borophagus hilli by Xiaoming Wang et al. in 1999.

== Fossil distribution ==
Borophagus hilli fossil specimens are widespread from east central Florida to southeastern Washington, from Idaho to New Mexico to Texas. Specimens were also found as far south as the Cuscatlán Formation of El Salvador, which also serves as the youngest dated specimen of B. hilli (Early Pleistocene, late Blancan faunal stage).
