= Brito Formation =

- Stratigraphic range: Late Eocene
- Type: Formation

Lithology
- Primary: Limestone
- Other: Marl

Location
- Coordinates: 11.3°N 86.0°W
- Approximate paleocoordinates: 11.8°N 85.7°W
- Region: Rivas Department
- Country: Nicaragua

Type section
- Named for: Brito River
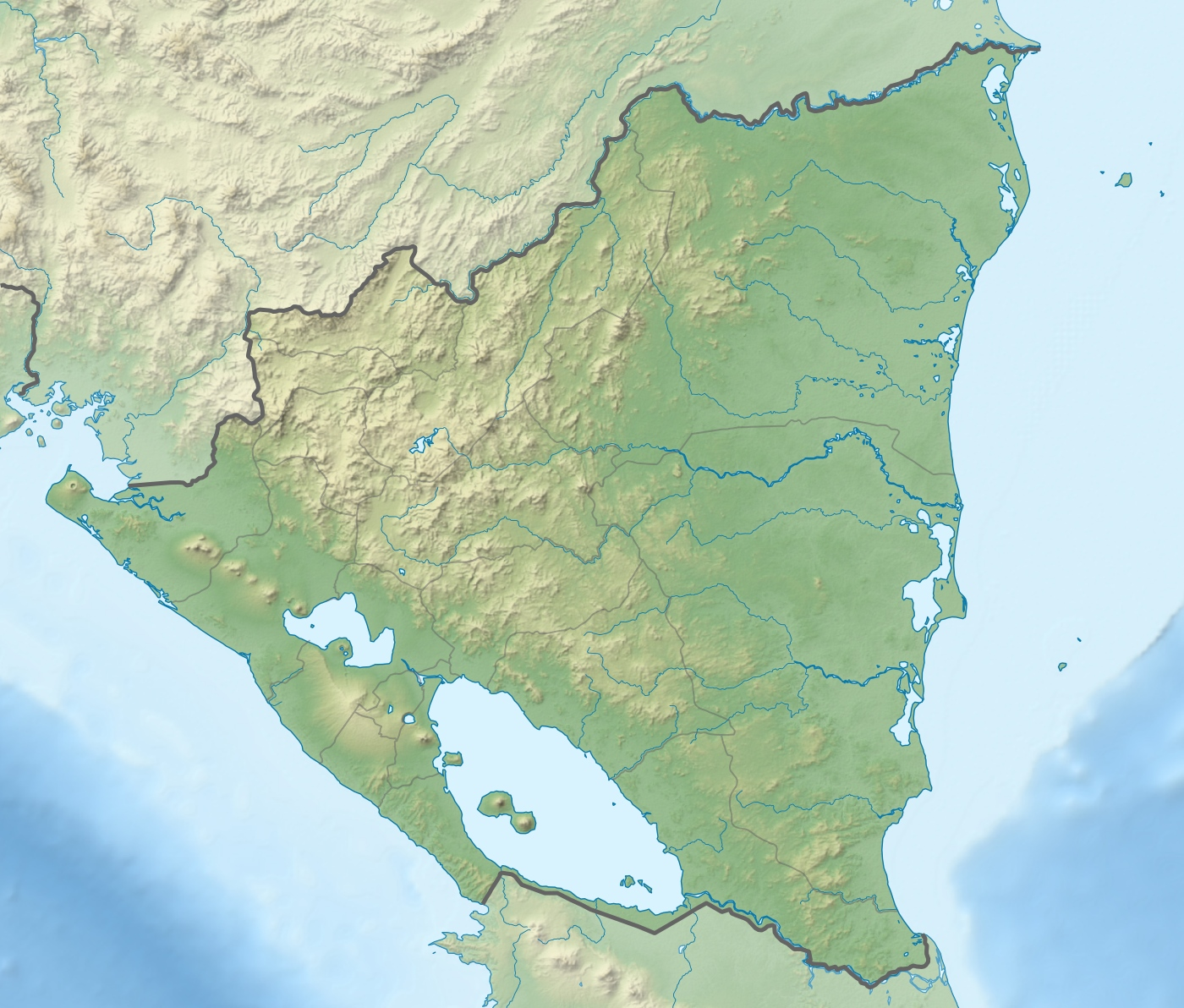
- Brito Formation (Nicaragua)

The Brito Formation is a geologic formation in Nicaragua. It preserves fossils dating back to the Late Eocene period.

== Fossil content ==
- Astrocoenia dachiardii
- Syzygophyllia hayesi

== See also ==
- List of fossiliferous stratigraphic units in Nicaragua
