= Escudo de Veraguas Formation =

Geologic formation in Panama

- Stratigraphic range: Piacenzian-Early Pleistocene
- Type: Formation
- Unit of: Bocas del Toro Group
- Overlies: Shark Hole Point Formation

Lithology
- Primary: Siltstone, sandstone

Location
- Coordinates: 9.1°N 81.6°W
- Approximate paleocoordinates: 9.0°N 81.1°W
- Region: Bocas del Toro
- Country: Panama

Type section
- Named for: Isla Escudo de Veraguas
- Escudo de Veraguas Formation (Panama)

The Escudo de Veraguas Formation is a geologic formation in Panama. It preserves fossils dating back to the Piacenzian to Early Pleistocene period.

== Fossil content ==
Among others, the following fossils have been found in the formations:

- Cancellaria stri
- Diaphus aequalis

== See also ==
- List of fossiliferous stratigraphic units in Panama
