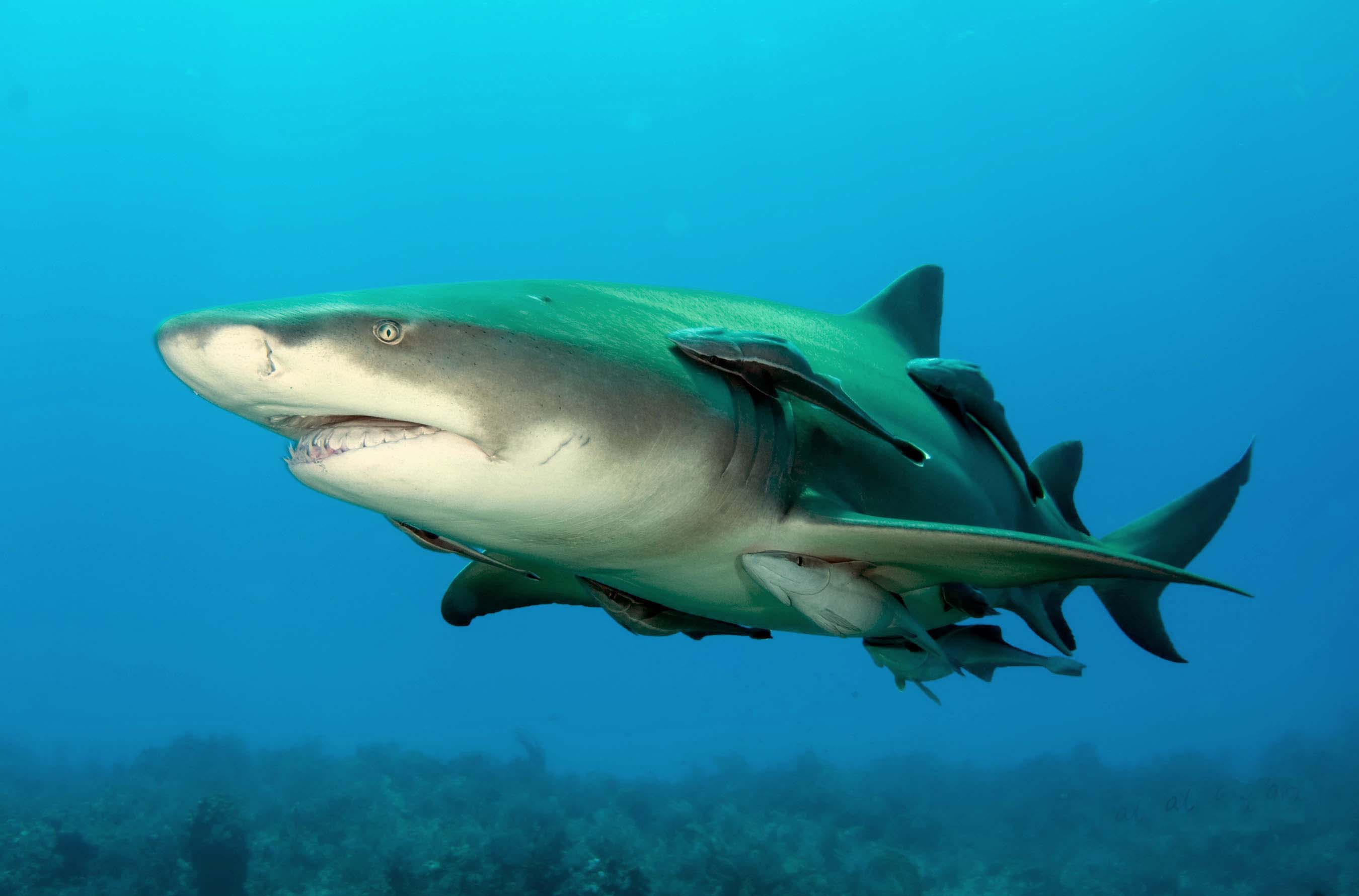
- Lemon shark (N. brevirostris)
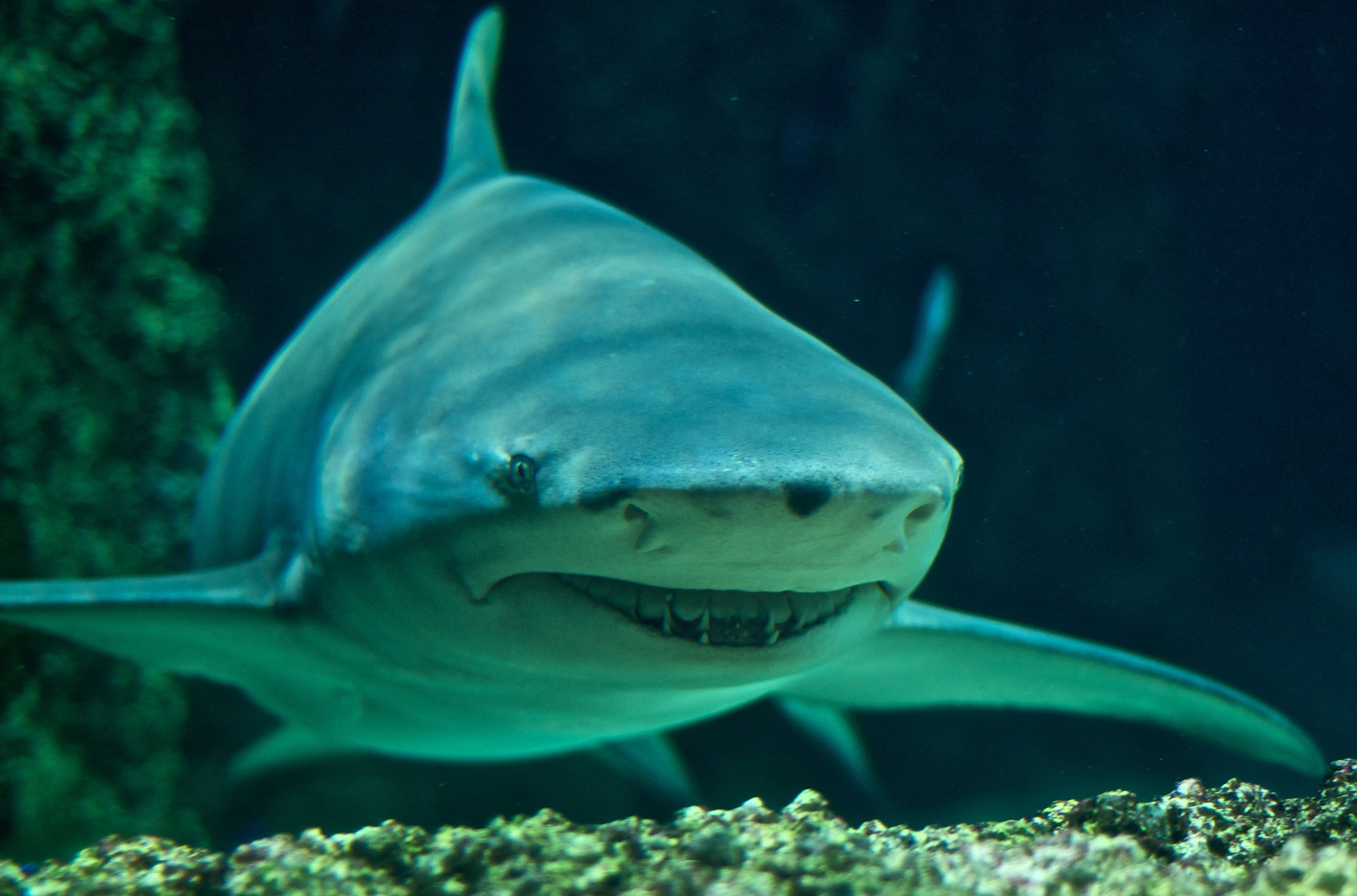
- Sicklefin lemon shark (N. acutidens)

Scientific classification
- Kingdom: Animalia
- Phylum: Chordata
- Class: Chondrichthyes
- Subclass: Elasmobranchii
- Division: Selachii
- Order: Carcharhiniformes
- Family: Carcharhinidae
- Genus: Negaprion; Whitley, 1940

Type species
- Carcharias fronto Jordan & Gilbert, 1882

Synonyms
- Hemigaleops Schultz and Welander in Schultz, L.P., E.S. Herald, E.A. Lachner, A.D. Welander, et al., 1953; Mystidens Whitley, 1944

= Negaprion =

Negaprion Temporal range: Late Eocene-Present

Genus of sharks

Negaprion is a genus of requiem sharks in the family Carcharhinidae. It contains the two extant species of lemon sharks: the lemon shark (N. brevirostris) of the Americas, and the sicklefin lemon shark (N. acutidens) of the Indo-Pacific. Both species are large, slow-moving, bulky sharks inhabiting shallow coastal waters, and can be identified by their short, blunt snouts, two dorsal fins of nearly equal size, and uniform yellowish brown or gray coloration.

== Species ==
- Negaprion acutidens (Rüppell, 1837) (sicklefin lemon shark)
- Negaprion brevirostris (Poey, 1868) (lemon shark)
- †Negaprion eurybathrodon (Blake, 1862)
- †Negaprion gilmorei (Leriche, 1942)

== See also ==
- List of prehistoric cartilaginous fish genera
