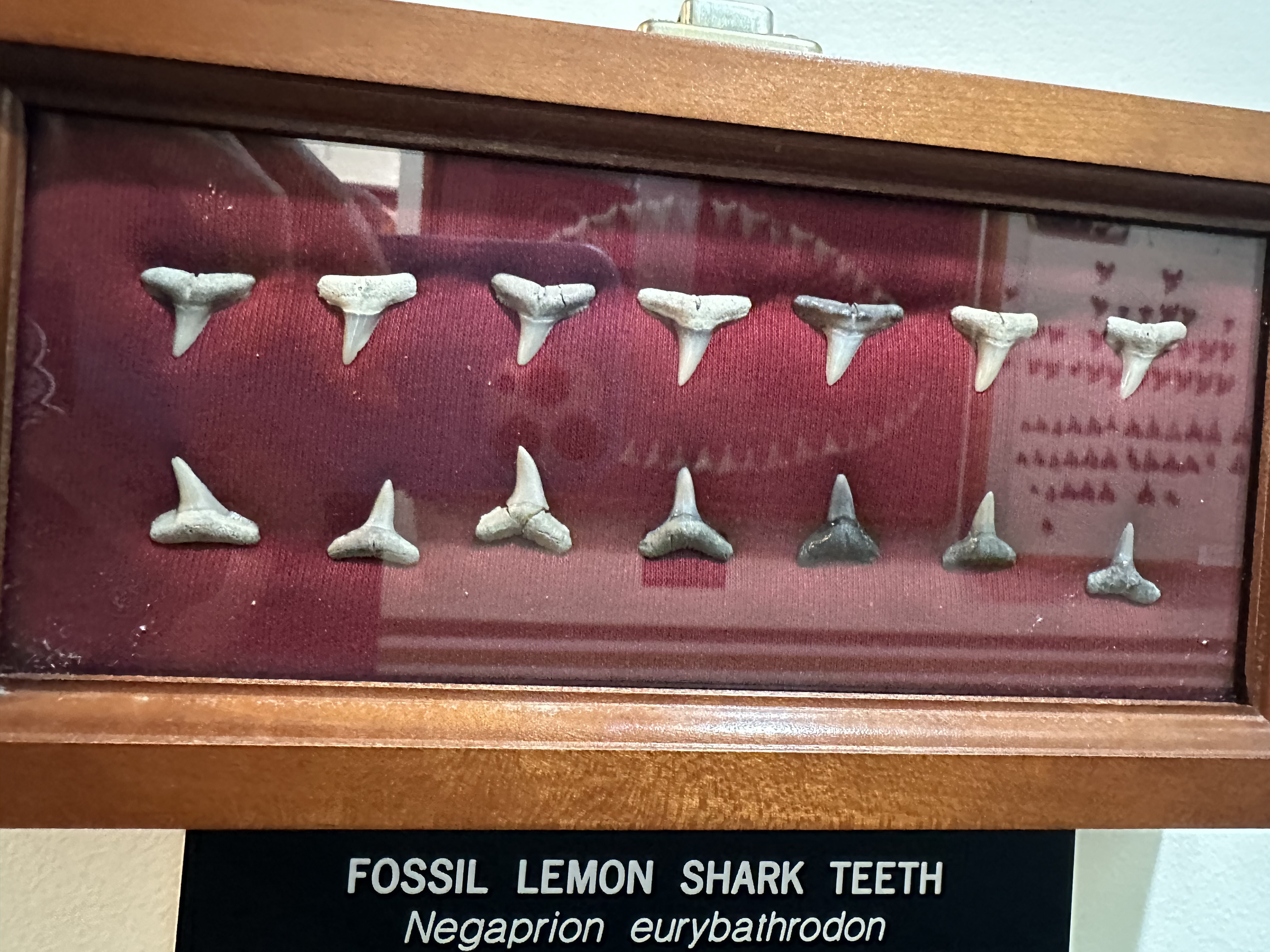
- Fossil dentition, Aurora Fossil Museum

Scientific classification
- Kingdom: Animalia
- Phylum: Chordata
- Class: Chondrichthyes
- Subclass: Elasmobranchii
- Division: Selachii
- Order: Carcharhiniformes
- Family: Carcharhinidae
- Genus: Negaprion
- Species: †N. eurybathrodon

Binomial name
- †Negaprion eurybathrodon Blake, 1862

Synonyms
- Lamna eurybathrodon

= Negaprion eurybathrodon =

Negaprion eurybathrodon Temporal range: Late Eocene-Pliocene ~37.2–2.6 Ma

Extinct species of shark

Negaprion eurybathrodon is an extinct species of lemon shark, which existed globally from the Late Eocene to the Pliocene. It was described by Blake in 1862.

== Distribution ==
Fossils of Negaprion eurybathrodon have been found in:

Eocene

- Kithar Formation, Pakistan
- Jacksonian Formation, Georgia, United States

Miocene

- Punta Judas Formation, Costa Rica
- Bolognano Formation, Italy
- Blue Clay Formation and Globigerina Limestone, Malta
- Portugal
- Dam Formation, Saudi Arabia
- Cantaure Formation, Venezuela

Pliocene

- Onzole Formation, Ecuador
