= Circumpolles =

Circumpolles Temporal range: Triassic–Cretaceous

Scientific classification
- Kingdom: Plantae
- Clade: Tracheophytes
- Clade: Gymnospermae
- Division: Pinophyta
- Class: Pinopsida
- Order: Pinales
- Family: †Cheirolepidiaceae
- Genus: †Circumpolles

Type of pollen

Circumpolles is a gymnosperm pollen type that is important in biostratigraphy and paleoenvironmental reconstruction. It characterizes the time between the middle Triassic to the middle Cretaceous Periods. This pollen has a unique morphology: it has a circular, equatorial colpus, which divides the pollen grain into two hemispheres. Circumpolles is also unique as it is the only gymnosperm with well developed nexinal columellae.

Classopollis were produced by shrubs that tolerated semiarid conditions, and Classopollis is correlated with evaporites and are therefore associated with desert basins, but the shrubs may have also lived in xeric uplands.
