= Canoa Formation =

Geologic formation in Ecuador

- Stratigraphic range: Piacenzian-Calabrian (Chapadmalalan-Uquian); ~3.6–1.8 Ma
- Type: Geological formation

Lithology
- Primary: Sandstone

Location
- Coordinates: 1.1°S 80.9°W
- Approximate paleocoordinates: 1.2°S 80.5°W
- Region: Manabí & Santa Elena Provinces
- Country: Ecuador

Type section
- Named for: Canoa
- Canoa Formation (Ecuador)

The Canoa Formation is a Piacenzian to Calabrian (Chapadmalalan to Uquian in the SALMA classification) geologic formation in Ecuador. The sandstones were deposited in a coastal environment. The formation is correlated to the Charco Azul Formation of western Panama and southeastern Costa Rica.

== Fossil content ==
The formation has provided bivalve, gastropod, crustacean, echinoid and scaphopod fossils and vertebrates of:

- Balaenopteridae indet.
- Cetacea indet.
- Chondrichthyes indet.
- Osteichthyes indet.

== See also ==
- List of fossiliferous stratigraphic units in Ecuador
