= Las Sierras Formation =

Geologic formation in Nicaragua

- Stratigraphic range: Pleistocene
- Type: Formation

Lithology
- Primary: Volcaniclastic

Location
- Coordinates: 12.3°N 86.0°W
- Approximate paleocoordinates: 12.3°N 85.9°W
- Region: Managua Department
- Country: Nicaragua
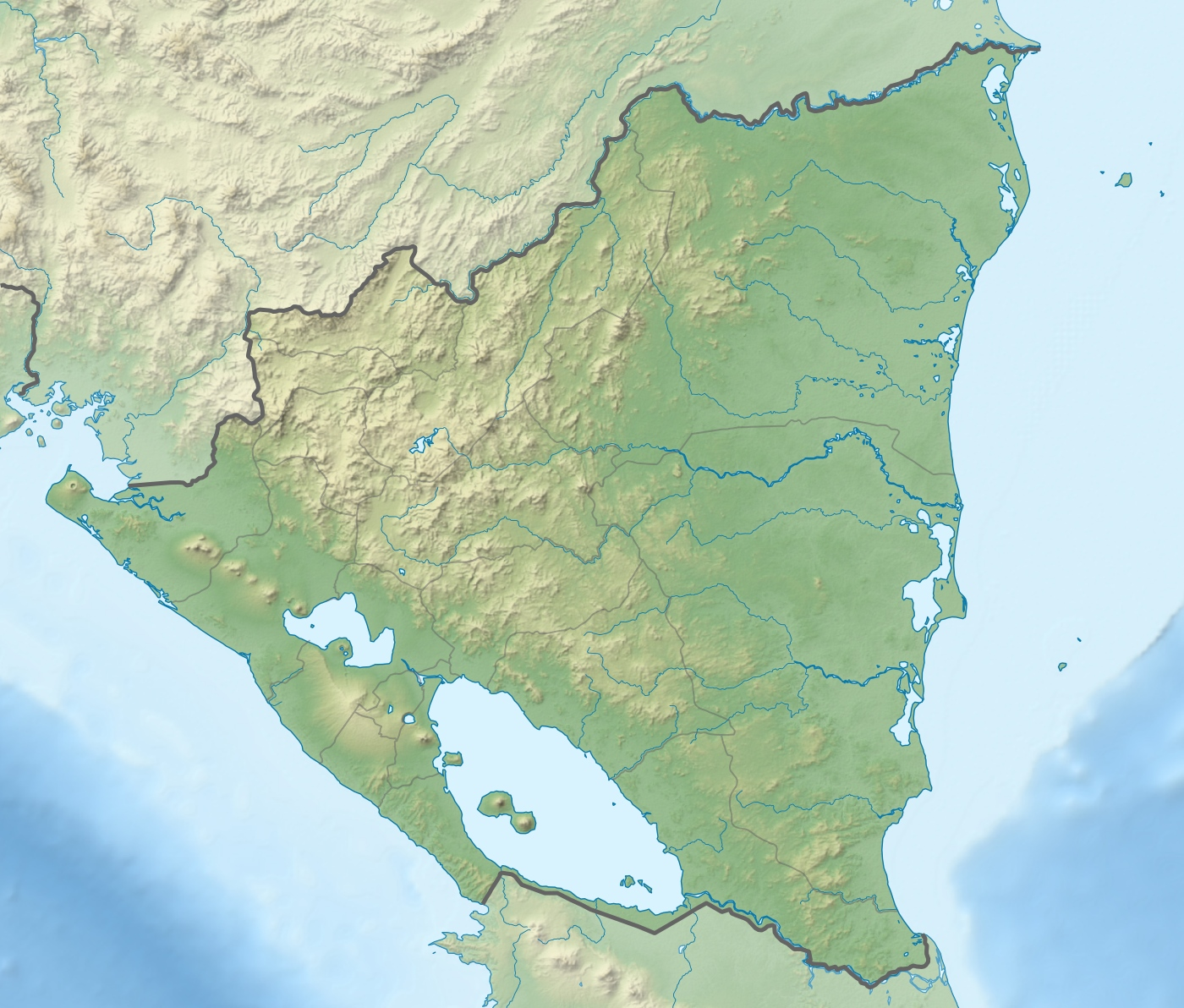
- Las Sierras Formation (Nicaragua)

The Las Sierras Formation is a geologic formation in Nicaragua. It preserves fossils dating back to the Pleistocene period.

== Fossil content ==
- Procyonidae indet.
- Proboscidea indet.

== See also ==
- List of fossiliferous stratigraphic units in Nicaragua
