= Santa Rosa Group =

Paleozoic geologic formation in Belize and Guatemala

- Stratigraphic range: Pennsylvanian-Kungurian; ~323–273 Ma
- Type: Group
- Sub-units: Chochal Formation

Lithology
- Primary: Shale
- Other: Sandstone, limestone

Location
- Coordinates: 15.6°N 92.0°W
- Region: Huehuetenango
- Country: Belize; Guatemala
- Santa Rosa Group (Guatemala)

The Santa Rosa Group is a geologic group in Belize and Guatemala. It contains the Chochal Formation. The marine lithified, black, calcareous shales preserve fossils dating back to the Pennsylvanian to Kungurian stages of the Carboniferous and Permian periods.

== See also ==
- List of fossiliferous stratigraphic units in Belize
- List of fossiliferous stratigraphic units in Guatemala
