= Charco Azul Formation =

Geologic formation in Costa Rica and Panama

- Stratigraphic range: Pliocene
- Type: Formation
- Unit of: Charco Azul Group
- Underlies: Armuelles Formation

Lithology
- Primary: Shale
- Other: Tuff

Location
- Coordinates: 8.5°N 82.8°W
- Approximate paleocoordinates: 8.3°N 82.2°W
- Region: Chiriquí Province
- Country: Costa Rica, Panama

Type section
- Named for: Charco Azul
- Charco Azul Formation (Panama)

Charco Azul Formation is a geologic formation of the Charco Azul Group in western Panama and southeastern Costa Rica. It preserves gastropod fossils dating back to the Pliocene period.

== Description ==
The Charco Azul Formation comprises tuffaceous shales deposited in a deep marine environment The formation unconformably underlies the Armuelles Formation. The formation is correlated to the Jama and Canoa Formations of Ecuador.

== Fossil content ==
These fossils have been reported from the formation:

- Strombina (Recurvina) penita, Strombina (Recurvina) recurva
- Distorsio decussata
- Marsupina bufo, M. nana

== See also ==
- List of fossiliferous stratigraphic units in Costa Rica
- List of fossiliferous stratigraphic units in Panama
