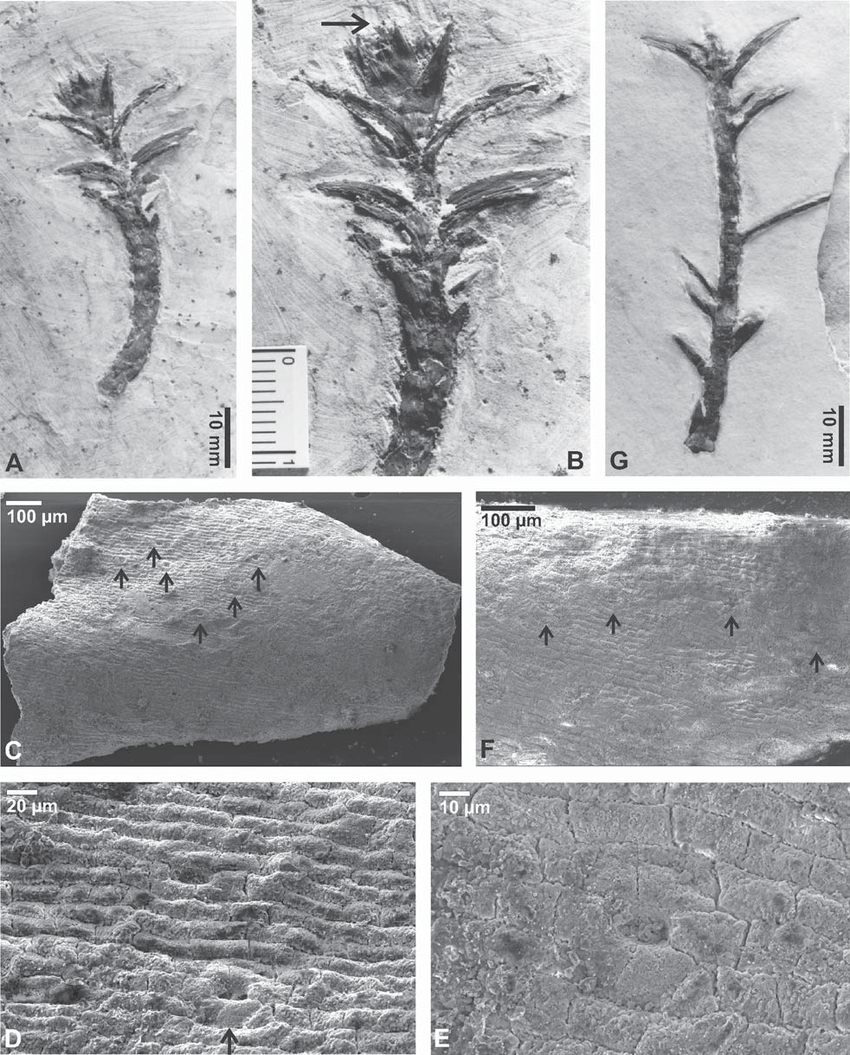
- Leafy shoot of Tomaxellia showing details of epidermis and stomata

Scientific classification
- Kingdom: Plantae
- Clade: Tracheophytes
- Clade: Gymnosperms
- Division: Pinophyta
- Family: †Cheirolepidiaceae; Turutanova-Ketova 1963

Genera
- See text

Synonyms
- Hirmeriellaceae

= Cheirolepidiaceae =

Cheirolepidiaceae Temporal range: Late Triassic–Paleocene

Extinct family of conifers

Cheirolepidiaceae (also spelled Cheirolepidaceae and known as Hirmeriellaceae) is an extinct family of conifers. They first appeared in the Triassic, and were a diverse and common group of conifers during most of the Mesozoic era, primarily at low latitudes, where they often formed a dominant element of the vegetation. They are united by the possession of a distinctive pollen type assigned to the form genus Classopollis (the distinctive characters of which include "distal cryptopore, proximal scar often with filaments, striate equatorial girdle, subequatorial rimula, tegillum (outer tectum of a lesser electron density), and columella-like infratectal elements") The name Frenelopsidaceae (as a separate family) or "frenelopsids" has been used for a group of Cheirolepidiaceae with jointed stems, thick internode cuticles, sheathing leaf bases and reduced free leaf tips. The leaf morphology has been noted as being similar to that of halophyte Salicornia. Several members of the family appear to have been adapted for semi-arid and coastal settings, with a high tolerance of saline conditions. Cheirolepidiaceae disappeared from most regions of the world during the Cenomanian-Turonian stages of the Late Cretaceous, but reappeared in South America during the Maastrichtian, the final stage of the Cretaceous, increasing in abundance after the K-Pg extinction and being a prominent part of the regional flora during the Paleocene, before going extinct. Survival into the Paleocene in North America and China has also been suggested based on pollen. However recent studies suggest those records, or some of them, are in reality reworked specimens from Cretaceous facies.

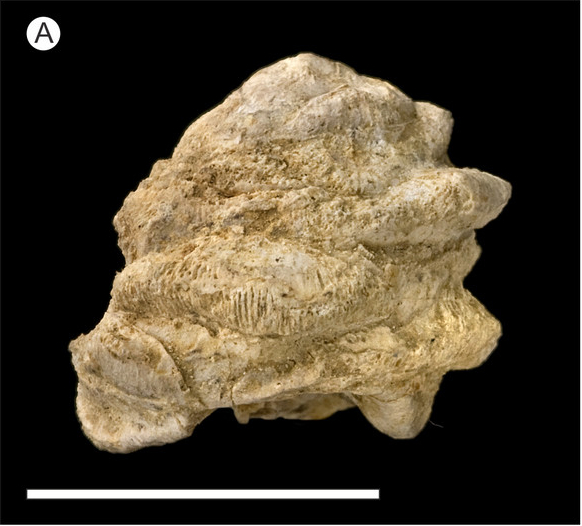
Pararaucaria cone

The habit of cheirolepidaceous confers is likely to have varied widely, from large trees (some with trunks over 3 metres (9.8 ft) thick at their base) to shrubs. Their architecture is poorly known, though some are thought to have had decurrent spreading crowns, while others had conical crowns. Many seem to have plagiotropic lateral branches that developed in whorls.

The relationships of Cheirolepidiaceae to other conifers are uncertain. A close relationship with Araucariaceae and Podocarpaceae has been proposed, based on the similarities of their reproductive structures, though other studies have suggested that they may fall outside the crown group of modern conifers among various voltzialean lineages.

At least some species of Cheirolepidiaceae have been suggested to have been pollinated by insects, due to the construction of the reproductive organs and the fact that insects have been found associated with Classopolis pollen grains.

The family name Hirmeriellaceae is a junior synonym of Cheirolepidiaceae. Some authors have suggested Hirmeriellaceae is the valid name for the family, due to nomenclatural issues with the original Cheirolepis genus, which is a junior homonym of a member of Asteraceae, with Cheirolepidium suggested to be an invalid replacement. Both genera are likely synonyms of Hirmeriella.

== Genera ==
- †Agathoxylon (wood, in part)
- †Arkansia (cone)
- †Brachyoxylon (wood)
- †Circulina (pollen)
- †Conites? (cones)
- †Classopollis (pollen)
- †Classostrobus (pollen cones)
- †Dicheiropollis (pollen)
- †Frenelopsis (foliage)
- †Hirmeriella (whole plant)
- †Pararaucaria (ovulate cones)
- †Pseudofrenelopsis (foliage)
- †Watsoniocladus (foliage)
- †Brachyphyllum (foliage, in part)
- †Tomaxiella (foliage and ovulate cone)
- †Kachaikestrobus (ovulate cones)
- †Alvinia (ovulate cones)
- †Glenrosa (leaves)
- †Pseudohirmeriella (ovulate cones)
