= Bohío Formation =

Geologic formation in Panama

- Stratigraphic range: Late Eocene-Late Oligocene
- Type: Formation
- Underlies: Caraba & Caimito Formations
- Overlies: Gatuncillo Formation
- Thickness: 75–450 m (246–1,476 ft)

Lithology
- Primary: Sandstone
- Other: Siltstone, conglomerate

Location
- Coordinates: 9.2°N 79.9°W
- Approximate paleocoordinates: 7.7°N 77.5°W
- Region: Colón Province
- Country: Panama
- Extent: Panama Basin
- Bohío Formation (Panama)

The Bohío Formation (Tbo, Tbm) is a geologic formation in Panama. It preserves fossils dating back to the Late Eocene to Late Oligocene period.

== Description ==
The Bohío Formation is characterized by the presence of poorly sorted debris, mostly basaltic: very coarse debris in the form of boulders and cobbles, and finer debris forming beds of sandstone, and the matrix of conglomerate. The facies are non-marine, but marine fossils are found in thin units in the upper part of the formation, in algal limestone and in both poorly sorted and fairly well sorted subgraywacke. The Bohío Formation overlies the Gatuncillo Formation conformably in most areas, although may lap onto the Gatuncillo Formation or basement.

The thickness of the formation is about 75 to 450 metres (246 to 1,476 ft). Smaller foraminifera from the basal part of the formation yielded an early Oligocene age. The upper part of the formation, from which the collections are derived yields larger foraminifera of late Oligocene age.

== See also ==
- List of fossiliferous stratigraphic units in Panama
- Postage stamps and postal history of the Canal Zone—Canal Zone Post office was located here
