= List of fossiliferous stratigraphic units in Central America =

Fossiliferous stratigraphic units in Central America

This page lists the fossiliferous stratigraphic units in Central America.

== Belize ==
Fossiliferous stratigraphic units in Belize
Ambergris Caye Limestone

Group	Formation	Period	Notes
	Ambergris Caye Limestone	Late Pleistocene	

== El Salvador ==
Fossiliferous stratigraphic units in El Salvador
Cuscatlán Formation

Group	Formation	Period	Notes
	Cuscatlán Formation	Blancan-Irvingtonian	

== Guatemala ==
Fossiliferous stratigraphic units in Guatemala
Herreria Formation
Campur Formation
Ixcoy Formation
Chocal Formation

Group	Formation	Period	Notes
	Herreria Formation	Miocene	
	Campur Formation	Turonian-Maastrichtian	
	Ixcoy Formation	Aptian-Maastrichtian	
Santa Rosa Group	Chocal Formation	Artinskian-Kungurian	

== Honduras ==
Fossiliferous stratigraphic units in Honduras
Gracias Formation
Esquias Formation
Valle de Ángeles Redbeds
Cantarranas Formation
Agua Fría Formation
El Plan Formation

Group	Formation	Period	Notes
	Gracias Formation	Miocene	
Valle de Ángeles Group	Esquias Formation	Late Albian-Early Turonian	
Valle de Ángeles Group	Valle de Ángeles Redbeds	Late Albian-Early Cenomanian	
	Cantarranas Formation	Valanginian	
	Agua Fría Formation	Bathonian	
	El Plan Formation	Middle Jurassic	

== Nicaragua ==
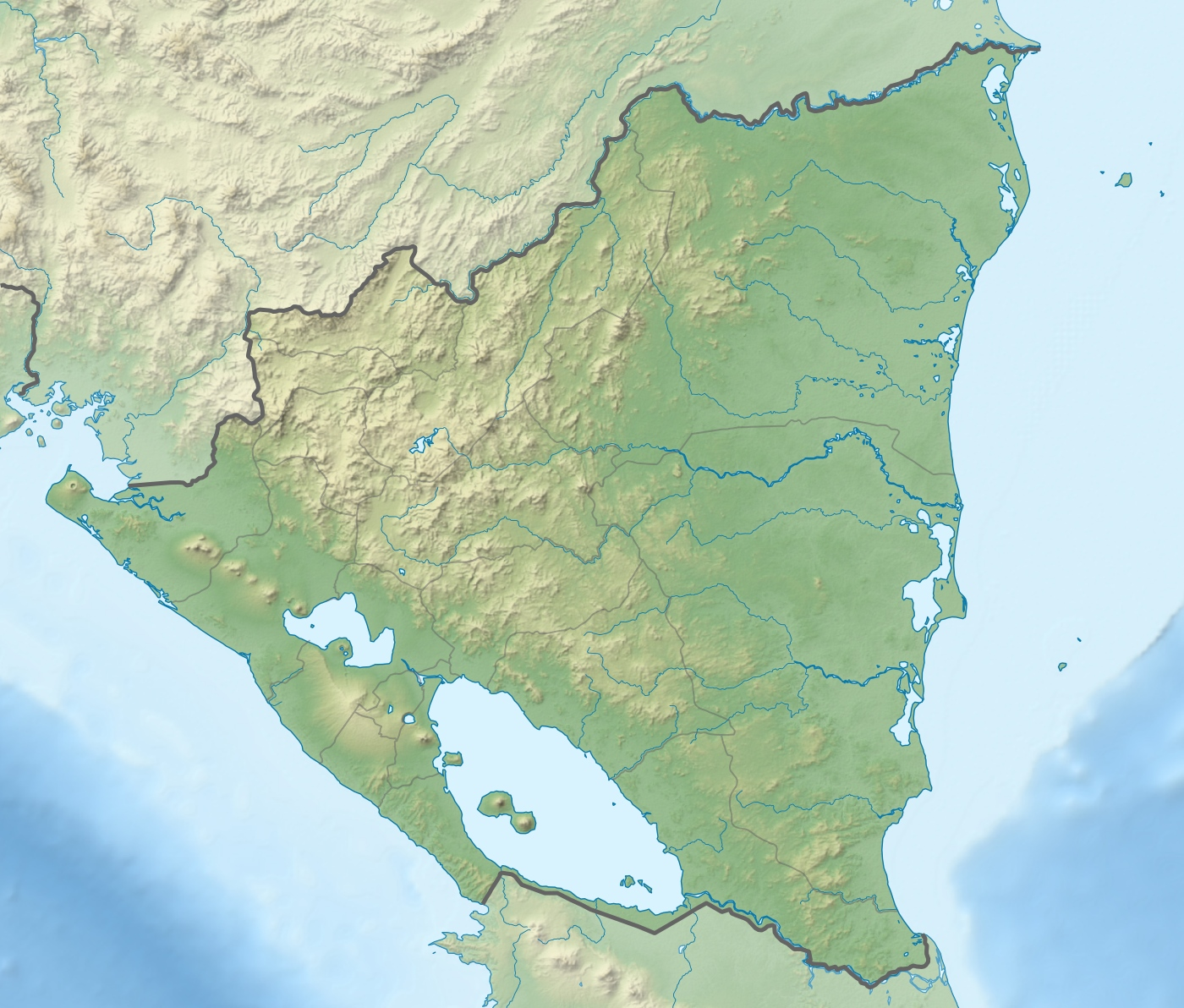
Fossiliferous stratigraphic units in Nicaragua
Las Sierras Formation
El Salto Formation
Brito Formation

Group	Formation	Period	Notes
	Las Sierras Formation	Pleistocene	
	El Salto Formation	Early Pliocene	
	Brito Formation	Late Eocene	

== Costa Rica ==
Fossiliferous stratigraphic units in Costa Rica
Charco Azul Group
Limón Group
Curré Formation
Oligocene
Paleocene-Eocene

Group	Formation	Period	Notes
Charco Azul Group	Armuelles Formation	Early Pleistocene	
Charco Azul Group	Penita Formation	Early Pliocene	
Charco Azul Group	Charco Azul Formation	Pliocene	
Limón Group	Moin Formation	Late Pliocene-Early Pleistocene	
Limón Group	Río Banano Formation	Middle Miocene-Piacenzian	
Limón Group	Uscari Formation	Late Miocene	
Limón Group	Quebrada Chocolate Formation	Miocene	
	Montezuma Formation	Pleistocene	
	Paso Real Formation	Late Pliocene-Early Pleistocene	
	Burica Sandstone	Early Pliocene	
Taraba Basin Group	Curré Formation	Hemphillian	
	Limónes Formation	Late Miocene	
	Punta Judas Formation	Middle Miocene	
	Juanilla Formation	Chattian	
	Conglomerado-Arenisca Formation	Late Oligocene	
	Punta Pelada Formation	Late Oligocene	
	Pacacua Formation	Oligocene	
	Descartes Formation	Ypresian-Priabonian	
	Barra Honda Formation	Late Paleocene	

== Panama ==
Fossiliferous stratigraphic units in Panama
Charco Azul Group
Bocas del Toro Group
Chagres Formation
Culebra Formation
Tuira Formation
Gatún Formation
Gatuncillo Formation
Tonosí Formation

Group	Formation	Period	Notes
	Pacific Muck Formation	Late Pleistocene-Holocene	
	Mount Hope Formation	Early Pleistocene	
	Urraca Formation	Early Pleistocene	
Charco Azul Group	Armuelles Formation	Early Pleistocene	
Charco Azul Group	Charco Azul Formation	Pliocene	
Bocas del Toro Group	Swan Cay Formation	Early Pleistocene	
Bocas del Toro Group	Isla Colón Formation	Early Pleistocene	
Bocas del Toro Group	Escudo de Veraguas Formation	Piacenzian-Early Pleistocene	
Bocas del Toro Group	Cayo Agua Formation	Zanclean-Piacenzian	
Bocas del Toro Group	Shark Hole Point Formation	Zanclean-Piacenzian	
Bocas del Toro Group	Nancy Point Formation	Messinian	
Bocas del Toro Group	Valiente Formation	Serravallian	
	Isla Solarte Formation	Piacenzian	
	Chagres Formation	Tortonian-Messinian	
	Gatún Formation	Serravallian-Tortonian	
	Alajuela Formation	Tortonian	
	Cucaracha Formation	Hemingfordian	
	La Boca Formation	Early Miocene	
	Old Bank Formation	Messinian	
	Tobabe Formation	Messinian	
	Tuira Formation	Tortonian	
	Chucunaque Formation	Tortonian	
	Culebra Formation	Aquitanian-Burdigalian	
	Las Cascadas Formation	Arikareean	
	Caimito Formation	Late Oligocene-Early Miocene	
	Panama Formation	Late Oligocene	
	Santiago Formation	Late Oligocene	
	Bohío Formation	Late Eocene-Late Oligocene	
	Caraba Formation	Early Oligocene	
	Tonosí Formation	Priabonian	
	Gatuncillo Formation	Middle-Late Eocene	

== See also ==
- Lists of fossiliferous stratigraphic units in North America
  - List of fossiliferous stratigraphic units in Mexico
- List of fossiliferous stratigraphic units in Colombia
- List of fossiliferous stratigraphic units in the Caribbean
