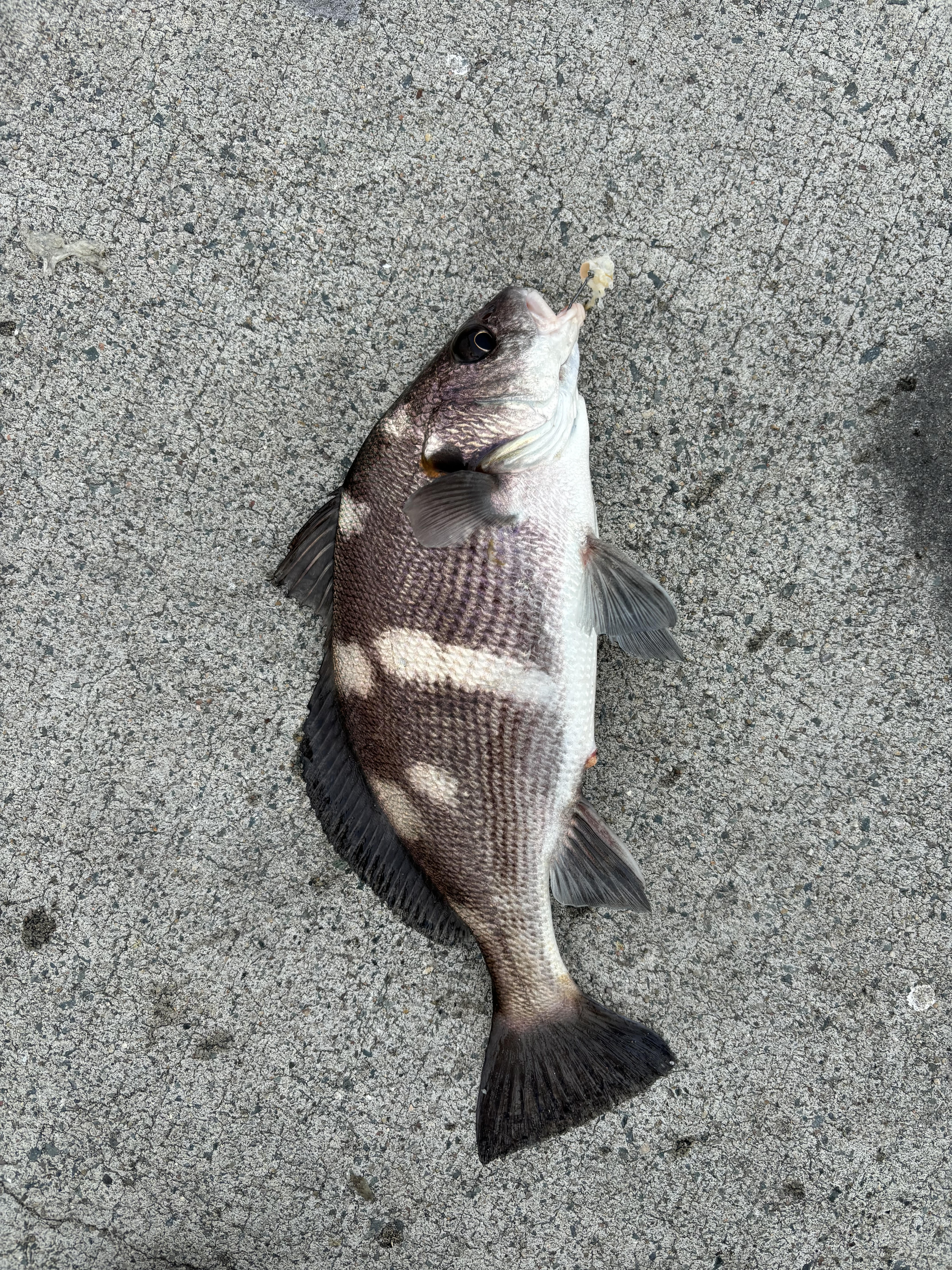

Scientific classification
- Kingdom: Animalia
- Phylum: Chordata
- Class: Actinopterygii
- Division: Teleostei
- Order: Acanthuriformes
- Family: Sciaenidae
- Genus: Cheilotrema
- Species: C. saturnum

Binomial name
- Cheilotrema saturnum (Girard, 1858)

= Cheilotrema saturnum =

Species of fish

Cheilotrema saturnum, the black croaker, China croaker or corvina roncacho, is a demersal species of sciaenid croaker found in the nearshore habitats of the Southern California Bight and Baja California.

== Taxonomy ==
The black croaker is one of two species in the genus Cheilotrema, contained within the family Sciaenidae, the croakers and drums. Cheilotrema is predicted to have diverged from the common ancestor of the genera Equetus and Pareques approximately 19 million years ago.

Cheilotrema saturnum was first described by Charles Frédéric Girard in 1858.

== Distribution ==
Black croakers are found from the northern reaches of the Southern California Bight to the southern stretch of the Baja California Peninsula and the northern portions of the Sea of Cortez. Within the Southern California Bight, they are very abundant in the mainland's nearshore habitats but occur far less frequently at Catalina Island. Populations are concentrated near rocky headlands of the coast, such as Palos Verdes.

== Description ==
Black croakers have compressiform bodies with an inferior mouth and a truncate tail. As adults, fish are mostly black with a silver ventral side. Often, 3-5 blotches are typically present on the dorsal surface of the fish, with a vertical white stripe running down from the margin between the two dorsal fins. In many cases, additional vertical stripes or blotches on the sides may be observed. The fins of adults range from clear to black.

As juveniles, black croakers are slightly more fusiform compared to the adults. They are colored silver with 3-6 horizontal black stripes reaching across the length of their body.

The maximum recorded size in a black croaker is a standard length of 381mm, though adults more typically reach 300mm. Their length-weight parameters are given by the equation W = 0 .00004L^2.9223, where W is weight in grams, and L is standard length in millimeters. The fish are noted to live up to 21 years, which is long relative to other croakers. There is no sexual dimorphism with respect to growth.

== Behavior ==
=== Habitat ===
Black croakers may be found at depths ranging from the surface to about 45m deep, though they most frequently occur at 3-15m. Black croakers have a propensity for rocky habitats, and are found more often in rocky reefs than kelp forests. During the summer, adults are occasionally observed over sand patches. Habitat choice may change based on the water conditions. Fish are more likely to be found in caves and underwater structures during periods of low turbidity, but may be observed 3 meters off the sea floor when visibility is low.

=== Trophic ecology ===
Black croakers primarily consume crustaceans. They have been noted as consuming shrimp and crabs.

=== Reproduction ===
The spawning season for black croakers is typically late spring to summer, with the peak of spawning occurring during midsummer. Females appear to release mature eggs continuously throughout the spawning season. There is relatively less recruitment during cold water years.

=== Other ===
Black croakers were demonstrated to orient their bodies relative to the substrate rather than to sunlight. This results in them swimming with their ventral side to the substrate at angles as extreme as 64° from vertical.

== Human interaction ==
Despite being an abundant and ecologically-important species in its range, black croakers are not the target of any recreational or commercial fishery. Hook-and-line fishermen occasionally catch them off the Southern California coast. In northern Baja California, they are a minor component of the local artisanal fishery.
