= Nibea mitsukurii =

Conservation status
- Least Concern (IUCN 3.1)

Scientific classification
- Kingdom: Animalia
- Phylum: Chordata
- Class: Actinopterygii
- Order: Acanthuriformes
- Family: Sciaenidae
- Genus: Nibea
- Species: N. mitsukurii

Binomial name
- Nibea mitsukurii (Jordan and Snyder, 1900)

Species of ray-finned fish

Nibea mitsukurii is a species of fish in the family Sciaenidae, order Acanthuriformes. It is a benthopelagic marine fish of temperate climate (32°N-23°N). It is found in the northwestern Pacific Ocean near Japan and the East China Sea. It is harmless to humans, and is commercially farmed for food.

The fish is sometimes called nibe croaker in English. In Japanese it is variously known as nibe, honnibe, haraka, ishimochi (lit. "has stones"), guchi, or shiroguchi (lit. "white croaker"). The name ishimochi is a reference to its large otoliths; the names guchi and shiroguchi come from the sound it produces – compare English croaker fish.

Males can reach 75 cm in total length. Number of vertebrae is 23. The fish's body is gray, and its meat is white when cooked. It can be distinguished visually by the absence of black spots on the upper gill cover, and the presence of rows of black spots on the sides of the body.

In Japan it is commercially farmed.

The isinglass from this species is especially sticky and is used to make a type of glue. In Japan both the fish and the glue are called nibe. Prior to the 19th century this isinglass, along with skin and connective tissue, was used as raw material for high-quality glue.
