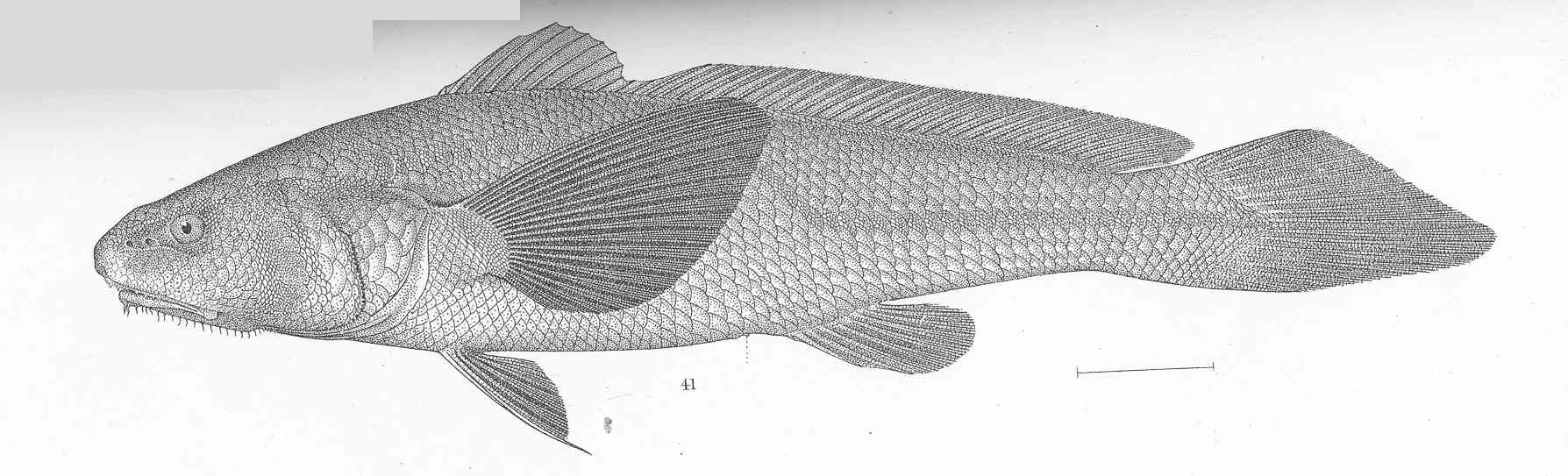
- Paralonchurus petersii

Scientific classification
- Kingdom: Animalia
- Phylum: Chordata
- Class: Actinopterygii
- Order: Acanthuriformes
- Family: Sciaenidae
- Genus: Paralonchurus; Boucourt, 1869

Type species
- Paralonchurus petersii Bocourt, 1869

Synonyms
- Polycirrhus Bocourt, 1869; Polyclemus Berg, 1895; Zaclemus Gilbert, 1898; Zonoscion Jordan & Evermann, 1896

= Paralonchurus =

Genus of fishes

Paralonchurus is a genus of marine ray-finned fishes belonging to the family Sciaenidae, the drums and croakers. These fishes are found in the eastern Pacific Ocean with one species in the western Atlantic Ocean.

== Taxonomy ==
Paralonchurus was first proposed as a monospecific genus in 1869 by the French zoologist and artist Marie Firmin Bocourt when he described Paralonchurus petersii as its only species. Bocourt gave the type locality as La Unión, El Salvador. The genus Paralonchurus is included in the subfamily Micropogoninae by some workers, but the 5th edition of Fishes of the World does not recognise subfamilies within the Sciaenidae, which it places in the order Acanthuriformes.

== Etymology ==
Paralonchurus combines para, which means "near", with Lonchrurus, a genus that shares some features with Paralonchurus such as the absence of pseudobranchiae.

== Species ==
Paralonchurus has the following valid species classified within it:

- Paralonchurus brasiliensis (Steindachner, 1875) (Banded croaker)
- Paralonchurus dumerilii (Bocourt, 1869) (Suco croaker)
- Paralonchurus goodei Gilbert, 1898 (Goode croaker)
- Paralonchurus peruanus (Steindachner, 1875) (Peruvian banded croaker)
- Paralonchurus petersii Bocourt, 1869 (Peters' banded croaker)
- Paralonchurus rathbuni (Jordan & Bollman, 1890) (Bearded banded croaker)

Some authorities classify the blackfin croaker (Lonchurus elegans) in the genus Paralonchurus and this makes the genus Lonchurus into a monospecific genus.

== Characteristics ==
Paralonchurus croakers have elongated bodies with a rounded back and a narrow, low head with ablunt and wide snout, belwo which is a horizontal mouth. They have small eyes and there are 5 pores and 3 pairs of barbels on the chin. There are between 8 and 22 thin barbels along the median margin of the lower jaw. There is an incision in the upper lip. The preoperculum may be either smooth or finely serrated. There is a deep incision separating the first, spiny part of the dorsal fin, supported by 9 or 10 slim spines, and the soft rayed part, supported by between 28 and 31 soft rays. The anal fin is supported by 2 spines and between 7 and 9 soft rays. The caudal fin is bluntly pointed. The maximum published total length for this genus is 51 cm (20 in) for the Peruvian banded croaker (L. peruanus) while the smallest species is the beraded banded croaker with a maximum published total length of 30 cm (12 in).

== Distribution ==
Paralonchurus croakers are found off the Americas with five of the six species occurring in the eastern Pacific Ocean between Mexico and Peru and one species, P. brasiliensis occurring from Panama to southern Brazil in the western Atlantic Ocean.
