= Striped croaker =

Conservation status
- Least Concern (IUCN 3.1)

- Secure (NatureServe)

Scientific classification
- Kingdom: Animalia
- Phylum: Chordata
- Class: Actinopterygii
- Order: Acanthuriformes
- Family: Sciaenidae
- Genus: Corvula
- Species: C. sanctaeluciae

Binomial name
- Corvula sanctaeluciae (Jordan, 1890)

Synonyms
- Bairdiella sanctaeluciae Jordan, 1890

Species of fish

The striped croaker (Corvula sanctaeluciae), also known as the St Lucian corvina, is a species of marine ray-finned fish belonging to the family Sciaenidae, the drums and croakers. This species is found in the western Atlantic Ocean in the Caribbean Sea and Gulf of Mexico.

== Taxonomy ==
The striped croaker was first formally described by the American ichthyologist David Starr Jordan in 1890 with its type locality given as Saint Lucia. The genus this species belongs to, Corvula has been placed in the subfamily Stelliferinae by some workers, but the 5th edition of Fishes of the World does not recognise subfamilies within the Sciaenidae which it places in the order Acanthuriformes. Its specific name refers to its type locality, the Caribbean island of Saint Lucia.

== Description ==
The striped croaker has a short head and a compressed, oblong body. It has moderately sized eyes and a moderately sized mouth that is a little oblique and open to the front. There are bands of small conical teeth in the jaws. There is no barbel on the chin but there are 5 pores. The margin of the preoperculum is thin, nearly smooth and there is a notch in the angle of the gill opening. The dorsal fin is supported by 10 or 11 spines in front of a deep notch and a single spine and between 21 and 24 soft rays behind the notch. There are 2 spines and 9 soft rays in the anal fin, the second spine is robust and is just under two-thirds of the length of the first spine. The caudal fin is rounded or straight on its rear edge. Most of the scales are ctenoid but there are cycloid scales on the head. The lateral line scales extend to the tip of the caudal fin. The maximum published total length of this fish is 26 cm (10 in). They are grey or greyish blue on the upper body, silvery on the lower body.there are indistinct streaks on the flanks, diagonal above and horizontal below the lateral line. The fins are pale, yellowish, with scattered dark spots and there is an indistinct dark spot at the origin of the pectoral fin.

== Distribution and habitat ==
The striped croaker is found in the Western Atlantic Ocean where it occurs from the Bahamas and eastern Florida south throughout the Antilles and along the mainland Caribbean coast from the Bay of Campeche in Mexico to the Guianas. They are common fishes of coastal waters where there are sandy and muddy bottoms.

== Biology ==
The striped croaker feeds mainly on benthic crustaceans. They lay pelagic eggs which hatch into pelagic larvae.

== Fisheries ==
The striped croaker is targeted by local fisheries, it is sold as food but the fish caught are mainly used as bait.
