= Pterotolithus lateoides =

Conservation status
- Data Deficient (IUCN 3.1)

Scientific classification
- Kingdom: Animalia
- Phylum: Chordata
- Class: Actinopterygii
- Order: Acanthuriformes
- Family: Sciaenidae
- Genus: Pterotolithus
- Species: P. lateoides

Binomial name
- Pterotolithus lateoides (Bleeker, 1849

Synonyms
- Otolithus lateoides Bleeker, 1849; Otolithes lateoides (Bleeker, 1849); Otolithus dolorosus Seale, 1910

Species of ray-finned fish

Pterotolithus lateoides, the bigmouth croaker, is a species of marine ray-finned fish belonging to the family Sciaenidae, the drums and croakers. This fish is found in the Western Pacific Ocean.
