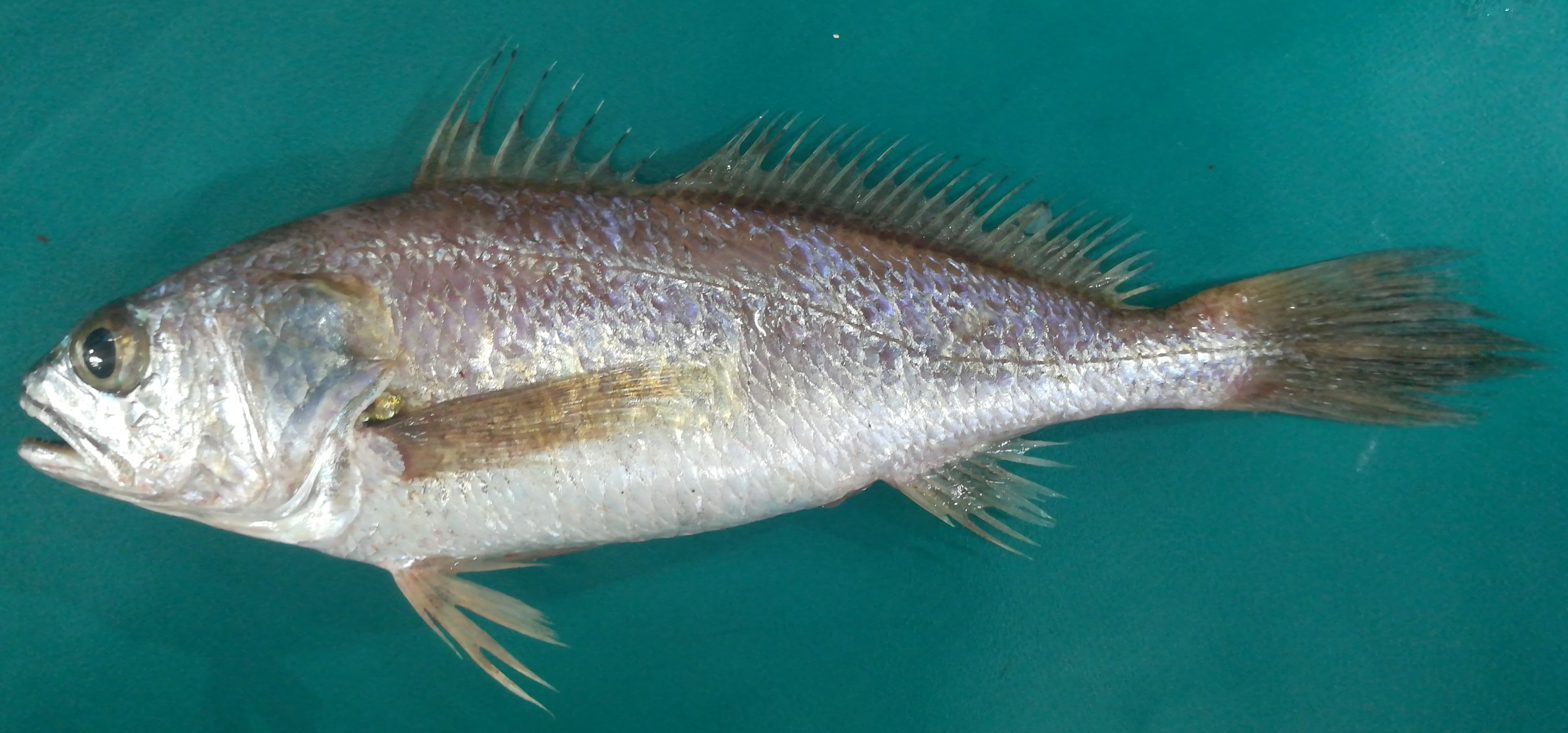
- Blackmouth croaker (Atrobucca nibe)

Scientific classification
- Kingdom: Animalia
- Phylum: Chordata
- Class: Actinopterygii
- Order: Acanthuriformes
- Family: Sciaenidae
- Genus: Atrobucca; Chu, Lo & Wu, 1963

Type species
- Sciaena nibe Jordan & Thompson 1911

= Atrobucca =

Genus of fishes

Atrobucca is a genus of marine ray-finned fishes belonging to the family Sciaenidae, the drums and croakers. These fishes are found in the Indo-West Pacific region.

== Taxonomy ==
Atrobucca was first proposed as a monospecific genus in 1963 by Chu Yuan-Ting, Yun-ling Lo and Han-ling Wu with Sciaena nibe as its designated type species and its only species. S. nibe had been described in 1911 by David Starr Jordan and William Francis Thompson from Wakanoura in the Wakayama Prefecture of Japan. This genus is classified in the family Sciaenidae which is placed within the suborder Sciaenoidei of the order Acanthuriformes in the 5th edition of Fishes of the World.

== Etymology ==
Atrobucca is a combination of atro, meaning "black", and bucca, which means "mouth", an allusion to the black mouth and pharyngeal cavity of the type species.

== Species ==
Atrobucca contains the following valid species:

- Atrobucca adusta Sasaki & Kailola, 1988 (Scorched croaker)
- Atrobucca alcocki Talwar, 1980 (Largehead croaker)
- Atrobucca antonbruun Sasaki, 1995
- Atrobucca bengalensis Sasaki, 1995 (Bengal blackmouth croaker)
- Atrobucca brevis Sasaki & Kailola, 1988 (Orange croaker)
- Atrobucca geniae Ben-Tuvia & Trewavas, 1987 (Aqaba blackmouth croaker)
- Atrobucca kyushini Sasaki & Kailola, 1988 (Blackspot croaker)
- Atrobucca marleyi (Norman 1922) (African blackmouth croaker)
- Atrobucca nibe (Jordan & Thompson, 1911) (Blackmouth croaker)
- Atrobucca trewavasae Talwar & Sathiarajan, 1975

== Characteristics ==
Atrobucca croakers have a moderately long, elongate body with an oblique, terminal mouth. There are three pairs of mental pores, one on the front of the chin and a pair each side of the tip of the jaw. They have a carrot-shaped swim bladder with many appendages branching out from along its length. The lining of the mouth lining and peritoneum are typically black. These are relatively small Sciaenids with the largest species being the scorched croaker (A. adusta) with a maximum published standard length of 46 cm (18 in).

== Distribution and habitat ==
Atrobucca croakers are found in the Indo-Pacific from the eastern coast of Africa to the Western Pacific off Australia and New Guinea. Some are rare, known from only a few specimens from relatively deepwater while others can be coastal.

== Fisheries ==
Atrobucca croakers, particularly the blackmouth croaker (A. nibe), can be important food fishes.
