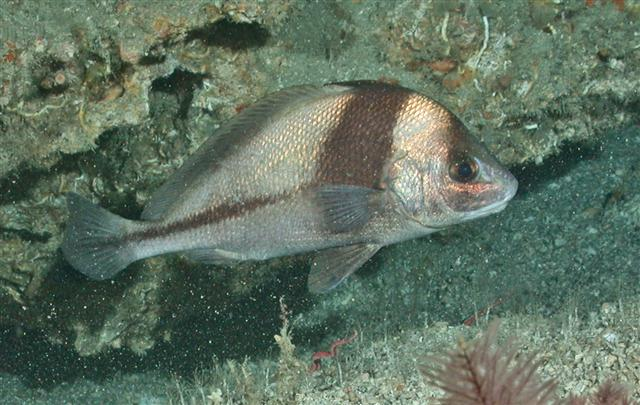

Conservation status
- Least Concern (IUCN 3.1)

Scientific classification
- Kingdom: Animalia
- Phylum: Chordata
- Class: Actinopterygii
- Order: Acanthuriformes
- Family: Sciaenidae
- Genus: Pareques
- Species: P. iwamotoi

Binomial name
- Pareques iwamotoi Miller & Woods, 1988

Synonyms
- Equetus iwamotoi (Miller & Woods, 1988)

= Blackbar drum =

Species of fish

The blackbar drum (Pareques iwamotoi) is a species of marine ray-finned fish belonging to the genus Pareques in the family Sciaenidae, the drums and croakers. It is found in the western Atlantic Ocean.

== Taxonomy ==
The blackbar drum was first formally described in 1988 by the American ichthyologists George C. Miller and Loren P. Woods with its type locality given as at a depth of 101 metres (331 feet) at Oregon Station 698 (30°03′36″N 86°55′36″W) south of Pensacola, Florida, in the United States. The genus Pareques is included in the subfamily Sciaeninae by some authors, but the 5th edition of Fishes of the World does not recognise subfamilies within Sciaenidae, which it places in the order Acanthuriformes.

== Etymology ==
The blackbar drum's specific name honors Tomio Iwamoto of the California Academy of Sciences, who Miller and Woods described as a "good friend" and who participated in the expedition on which the type specimen was collected.

== Description ==
The blackbar drum has a deep, rhomboid body with an arched dorsal profile. The head is low, with a moderately large eye and a snout protruding beyond the mouth, with a notched upper jaw which encloses the lower jaw. The villiform teeth are arranged in bands with those in the outer row of the lower jaw being enlarged and resembling canine teeth. There are no barbels on the chin but there are five pores and there are ten pores on the snout. The preoperculum has weak serrations. The long based dorsal fin has a deep notch separating the spiny and soft-rayed parts with between eight and ten spines before the notch and a single spine and between 37 and 41 soft rays behind it. The spiny part is tall with the sixth spine being the longest. The anal fin is supported by two spines, the second spine being quite thin, and seven soft rays. The scales of the body are ctenoid while those on the head are cycloid, and there are thick coverings of scales on the bases of the soft-rayed part of the dorsal and anal fins. This species has a maximum published total length of 20 centimetres (7.9 inches). The overall color is gray with a wide black bar running from the dorsal fin to the pelvic fin and a thinner dark stripe running horizontally along the flank. The fins are dark. Juveniles are whiter in color with a slender black bar down the middle of the snout and another between the eyes with the same stripes on the body as the adults. As individuals grow larger the pattern of stripes on the body becomes less distinct.

== Distribution and habitat ==
The blackbar drum is found in the western Atlantic Ocean from North Carolina south into the Gulf of Mexico, although it is absent from Cuba, and along the Caribbean coast of Central and northern South America from southern Nicaragua to the Orinoco Delta in Venezuela. It is found at depths between 37 and 184 metres (121 and 604 ft), although young fish may be found in much shallower waters. In the Gulf of Mexico, the habitat of this fish is shallow, coastal waters over sandy, muddy or rocky substrates.
