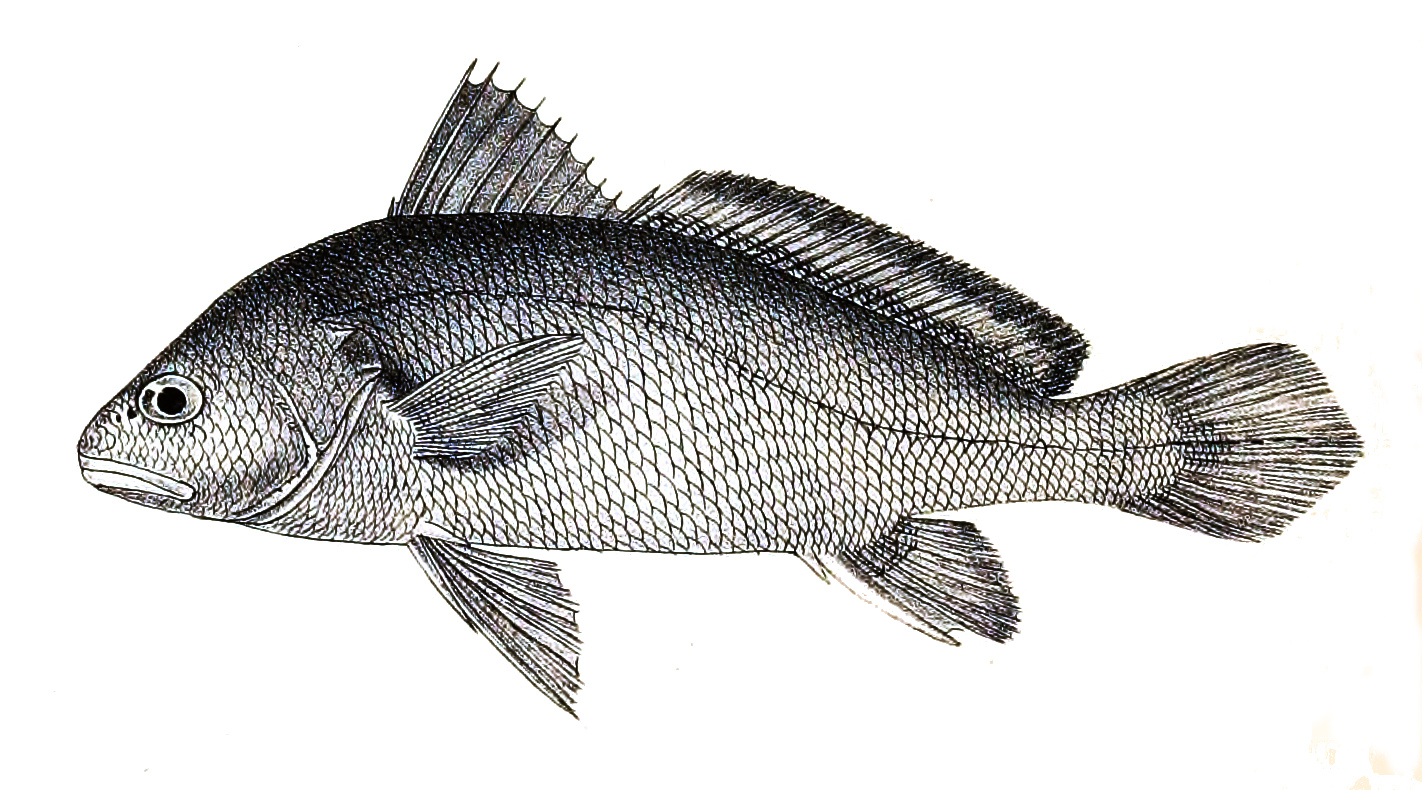

Scientific classification
- Kingdom: Animalia
- Phylum: Chordata
- Class: Actinopterygii
- Division: Teleostei
- Order: Acanthuriformes
- Family: Sciaenidae
- Genus: Nibea
- Species: N. soldado

Binomial name
- Nibea soldado (Lacépède, 1802)

= Nibea soldado =

Species of fish

Nibea soldado, commonly known as the soldier croaker, is a species of fish native to the northern Indian and western Pacific Oceans, and found in estuaries of south and southeast Asia, Indochina and northern Australia.
