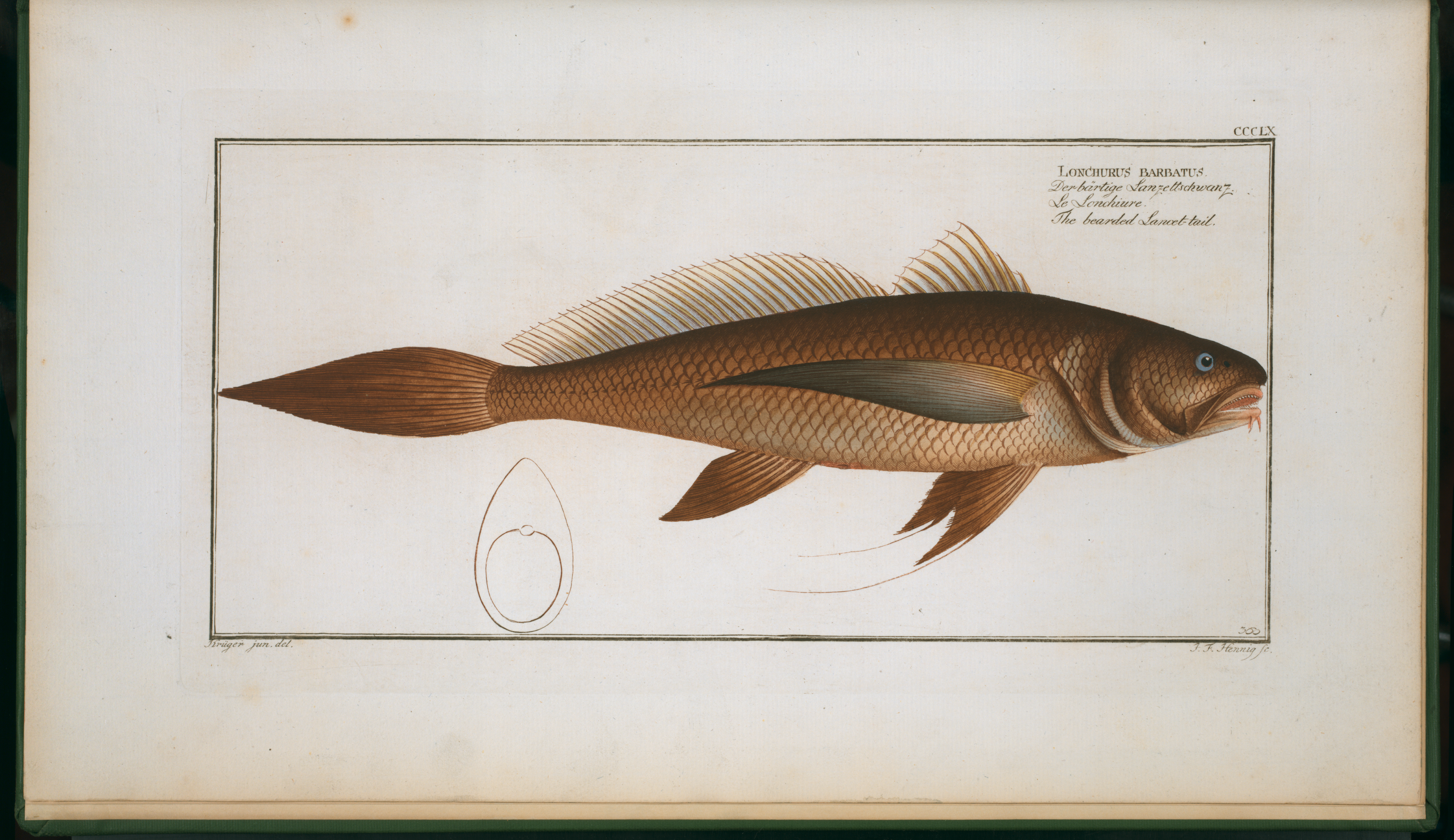

Conservation status
- Least Concern (IUCN 3.1)

Scientific classification
- Kingdom: Animalia
- Phylum: Chordata
- Class: Actinopterygii
- Order: Acanthuriformes
- Family: Sciaenidae
- Genus: Lonchurus
- Species: L. lanceolatus

Binomial name
- Lonchurus lanceolatus (Bloch, 1788)

Synonyms
- Perca lanceolata Bloch, 1788; Lonchurus barbatus Bloch, 1793

= Longtail croaker =

Species of ray-finned fish

The longtail croaker (Lonchurus llanceolatus) is a species of marine ray-finned fish belonging to the family Sciaenidae, the croakers and drums. This species is found in the western Atlantic Ocean.
