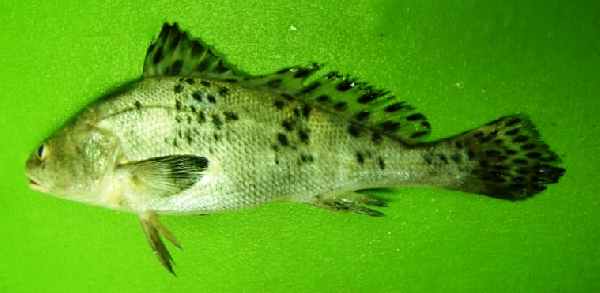

Conservation status
- Near Threatened (IUCN 3.1)

Scientific classification
- Kingdom: Animalia
- Phylum: Chordata
- Class: Actinopterygii
- Division: Teleostei
- Order: Acanthuriformes
- Family: Sciaenidae
- Genus: Protonibea; Trewavas, 1971
- Species: P. diacanthus

Binomial name
- Protonibea diacanthus (Lacépède, 1802)

Synonyms
- List: Lutjanus diacanthus Lacépède, 1802; Johnius diacanthus (Lacépède, 1802); Nibea diacanthus (Lacépède, 1802); Protonibea diacantha (Lacépède, 1802); Pseudosciaena diacanthus (Lacepède, 1802); Sciaena diacanthus (Lacépède, 1802); Johnius cataleus Cuvier, 1829; Corvina catalea (Cuvier, 1829); Corvina platycephala Cuvier, 1830; Johnius valenciennii Eydoux & Souleyet, 1850; Sciaena goma Tanaka, 1915; Corvina nigromaculata Borodin, 1930; Sciaena antarctica rex Whitley, 1945

= Blackspotted croaker =

Species of fish

The blackspotted croaker (Protonibea diacanthus), also known in Australia as the black jewfish, is a species of marine ray-finned fish belonging to the family Sciaenidae, the drums and croakers. This fish is found in the Indo-Pacific region. It is the only species in the monospecific genus Protonibea.

== Taxonomy ==
The blackspotted croaker was first formally described in 1802 as Lutjanus diacanthus by the French naturalist Bernard Germain de Lacépède without its type locality being given. In 1971 Ethelwynn Trewavas classified this species in the monospecific genus Protonibea. This taxon has been placed in the subfamily Otolithinae by some workers, but the 5th edition of Fishes of the World does not recognise subfamilies within the Sciaenidae which it places in the order Acanthuriformes.

Catalog of Fishes mentions that the monspecific genus Megalonibea may be a synonym of Protonibea, however, as Protonibea was proposed as a genus by Ethelwynn Trewavas in 1973 that name would be a junior synonym of Megalonibea, and it is treated as such by other authors. If that is the case then the binomial for this species should be Megalonibea diacantha, with Megalonibea fusca being a synonym of M. diacantha.

== Etymology ==
The blackspotted croaker's genus name. Protonibea prefixes protos, meaning "first", with Nibea as its wide range and characteristics suggest that it may be close to the ancestral form of Nibea and related genera. The specific name, diacanthus, means "two spined" as Hamilton originally described this species as a snapper in the family Lutjanidae with 2 spines in the anal fin rather than 3.

== Description ==
The blackspotted croaker has the frontmost pores on its chin very close to the tip of the lower jaw and they are joined by a groove. The swimbladder has a shape like a carrot and has branched appendages along the whole of both its sides but none of these goes through the transverse septum. The dorsal fin is divided by an incision with 9 or 10 spines supporting the fin to the front of the incision and a single spine and 22 to 25 soft rays supporting the fin to the rear of the incision. The anal fin has 2 spines and 7 soft rays supporting it. This species reaches a maximum total length of 180 cm (71 in). There are between 3 and 5 broad dark vertical bands on the body and numerous small black spots on the head, dorsal part of the body and the dorsal and caudal fins. These marking fade as the fish grows larger. The pectoral, pelvic, anal and lower caudal fin are dark.

== Distribution and habitat ==
The blackspotted croaker has a wide Indo-Pacific distribution from the Persian Gulf (where it is considered Least Concern) east into the Pacific Ocean where it extends north to Japan and south to northern Australia. In Australia their range extends from Onslow, Western Australia, around the northern tropical coast as far as Mackay, Queensland. It is found in coastal waters, usually no deeper then 60 m (200 ft), over mud substrates. It occasionally enters estuaries and the tidal reaches of rivers.

== Commercial importance ==
The fish is considered a delicacy, it is prized in East Asia because even though there is no evidence, some people actually think its organs are medicinal. The fish are most expensive in countries like Singapore, Malaysia, Indonesia, Hong Kong and Japan. This fish is known locally as Telia in Odia, and in 2020, fishermen from Odisha caught one weighing around 22 kg (48 lb 8 oz). A pharmaceutical company purchased it ₹8000 per kg in an auction. Similarly in 2019, another fishermen from Odisha caught a 10 kg (22 lb) fish and was sold ₹10,000 per kg. In 2024, a Blackspotted croaker weighing around 25.36 kg (55 lb 15 oz) was caught in the Sundarbans, Bangladesh. This exceptional catch garnered interest and fetched a high price, negotiated between ৳375,000 to ৳400,000. In 2023, Gujarat announced Blackspotted croaker as the state fish.
