= Nibea semifasciata =

Scientific classification
- Domain: Eukaryota
- Kingdom: Animalia
- Phylum: Chordata
- Class: Actinopterygii
- Order: Acanthuriformes
- Family: Sciaenidae
- Genus: Nibea
- Species: N. semifasciata

Binomial name
- Nibea semifasciata (Chu, Lo & Wu, 1963)

Species of fish

Nibea semifasciata, commonly known as the sharpnose croaker, is a species of fish native to the western Pacific Ocean.
