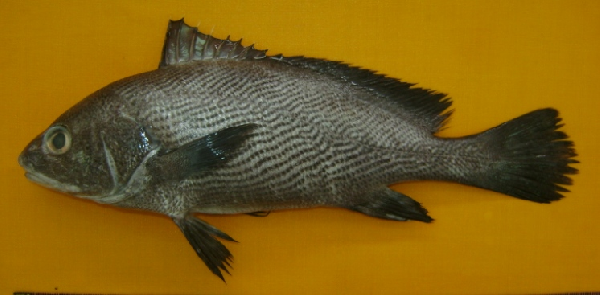

Conservation status
- Least Concern (IUCN 3.1)

Scientific classification
- Kingdom: Animalia
- Phylum: Chordata
- Class: Actinopterygii
- Order: Acanthuriformes
- Family: Sciaenidae
- Genus: Paranibea; Trewavas, 1977
- Species: P. semiluctuosa

Binomial name
- Paranibea semiluctuosa (Cuvier, 1830)

Synonyms
- Corvina semiluctuosa Cuvier, 1830; Johnius semiluctuosus (Cuvier, 1830); Nibea semiluctuosa (Cuvier, 1830); Sciaena semiluctuosa (Cuvier, 1830)

= Half-mourning croaker =

Species of fish

The half-mourning croaker (Paranibea semiluctuosa) is a species of marine ray-finned fish belonging to the family Sciaenidae, the drums and croakers. It is the only species in the monospecific genus Paranibea. This fish is found in the Indo-Pacific region.

== Taxonomy ==
The half-mourning croaker was first formally described as Corvina semiluctuosa in 1830 by the French zoologist Georges Cuvier with Malabar given as the type locality. In 1977 Ethelwynn Trewavas classified C. semiluctuosa in a new monospecific genus Paranibea. This taxon is included in the subfamily Otolithinae by some workers, but the 5th edition of Fishes of the World does not recognise subfamilies within the Sciaenidae, which it places in the order Acanthuriformes.

== Etymology ==
The half-mourning croaker was considered to be classified within Nibea and the genus name, Paranibea, means "like" or "close to" Nibea. The specific name semiluctuosa translates as "half mourning" and is presumed to refer to the dark stripes running along the scales over most of the body, except for a narrow area on the belly.

== Description ==
The half-mourning croaker has a deep body, which is over 3 times the standard length, with a rounded dorsal profile and a slightly inferior mouth, which has thick, warty lips. The teeth in the lower jaw are all the same size. The swim bladder is shaped like a carrot and has branched appendages along the entirety of each side, the pair at the front go through the transverse septum. The dorsal fin has a shallow notch with 9 or 10 spines before the notch and 1 spine and between 27 and 31 soft rays to its rear. The anal fin is supported by 2 spines and 7 or 8 soft rays. The colour is dark with numerous, slender, sinuous black stripes and with the anal and pelvic fins being darker than the other fins. The maximum published total length for this species is 40 cm (16 in), although 30 cm (12 in) is more typical.

== Distribution and habitat ==
The half-mourning croaker is found in the Indo-West Pacific where it has it is found in Iran and Pakistan east to northern Myanmar, it has been recorded in Peninsular Malaysia but records from farther east require to be verified. It is found in coastal waters over mud substrates, although in Bangladesh it has been recorded on sandy substrates.

== Fisheries ==
The half-mourning croaker is commonly landed by commercial fisheries, especially in western India, and is also taken as bycatch. The fish landed are sold fresh or are preserved by drying or salting.
