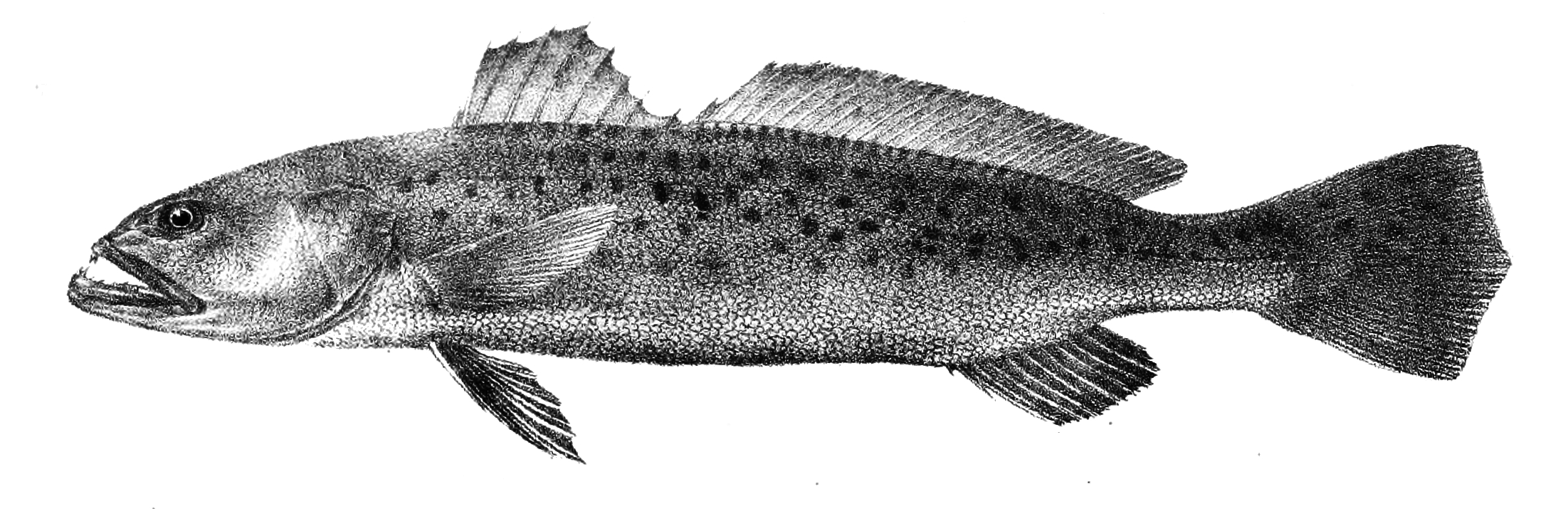

Conservation status
- Least Concern (IUCN 3.1)

Scientific classification
- Kingdom: Animalia
- Phylum: Chordata
- Class: Actinopterygii
- Order: Acanthuriformes
- Family: Sciaenidae
- Genus: Pterotolithus
- Species: P. maculatus

Binomial name
- Pterotolithus maculatus (Cuvier, 1830)

Synonyms
- Otolithus maculatus Cuvier, 1830; Otolithoides maculatus (Cuvier, 1830); Otolithus bispinosus Cuvier, 1830; Otolithus submaculatus Blyth, 1860

= Pterotolithus maculatus =

Species of ray-finned fish

Pterotolithus maculatus, commonly known as the blotched tiger-toothed croaker, is a marine fish native to the Indian Ocean.
