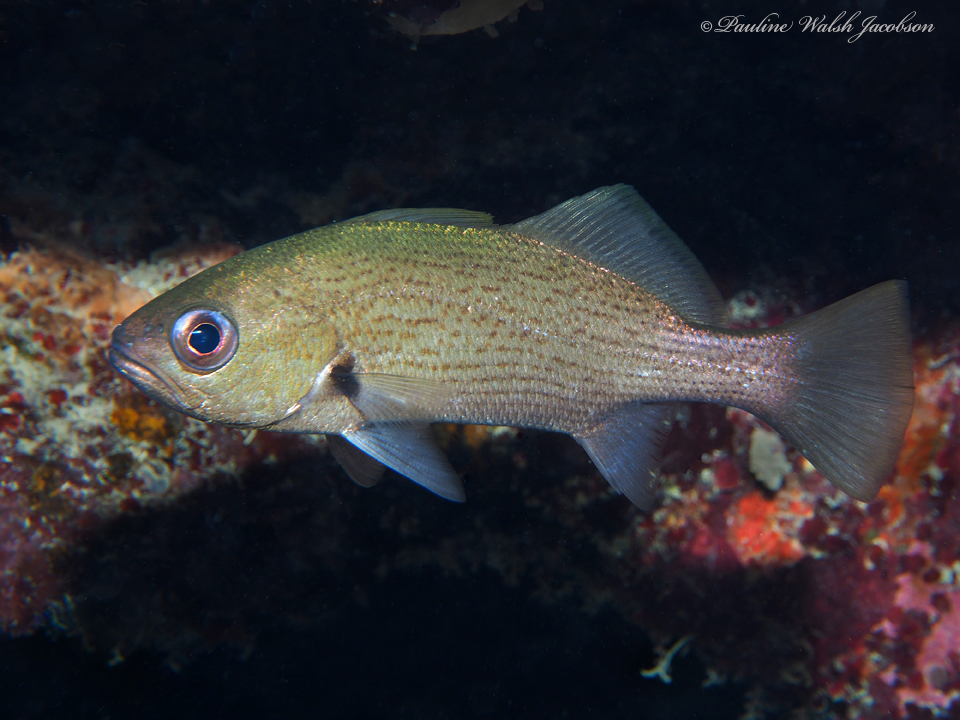

Conservation status
- Least Concern (IUCN 3.1)

Scientific classification
- Kingdom: Animalia
- Phylum: Chordata
- Class: Actinopterygii
- Order: Acanthuriformes
- Family: Sciaenidae
- Genus: Odontoscion
- Species: O. dentex

Binomial name
- Odontoscion dentex (Cuvier, 1830)

Synonyms
- Corvina dentex Cuvier, 1830

= Odontoscion dentex =

Species of fish

Odontoscion dentex, the reef croaker or brown large-eyed croaker, is a species of marine ray-finned fish belonging to the family Sciaenidae, the drums and croakers. It is found in coral and rocky reefs of the tropical Western Atlantic, living as solitary individuals or in small groups at a depth of 1 to 30 m (3 ft 3 in to 98 ft 5 in). This species feeds on small fish, shrimp, and larvae.

== Taxonomy ==
Odontoscion dentex was first formally described in 1830 as Corvina dentex by the French zoologist Georges Cuvier with its type locality given as Port-au-Prince in Haiti. In 1862 the American biologist Theodore Gill classified Cuviers' C. dentex in a new monospecific genus Odontoscion, designating it as the type species. This species has been placed in the subfamily Stelliferinae by some workers, but the 5th edition of Fishes of the World does not recognise subfamilies within the Sciaenidae which it places in the order Acanthuriformes.

== Etymology ==
Odontoscion dentex has the generic name Odontoscion which is a combination of odontos, meaning teeth, a reference to the 6 or 7 large canine-like teeth on each side of both jaws of the type species, with scion, a modern Greek name of the shi drum (Umbrina cirrosa), which Gill chose in preference to "sciaena" because he thought that it sounded better, similar to his coining of Cynoscion. The specific name dentex means toothed and also refers to the large teeth.

== Description ==
Odontoscion dentex has a short, rather oblong and compressed bodies, with a smoothly arched dorsal profile. It has a low head with a conical snout and a large eye. There is a small protuberance on the tip of the lower jaw. The mouth is moderately large, upwards pointing and has a protruding lower jaw. There is a row of large teeth in the front of each jaw, with a pair of canines at the tip of the lower jaw. The snout has 8 pores and there are a further 4 pores on the chin, which does not have a barbel. The preoperculum is smooth. The dorsal fin is supported by 11 or 12 spines before the incision and by a single spine and between 23 and 26 soft rays to the rear of the incision, The anal fin has 2 spines and 8 or 9 soft rays, with the second robust spine being 75% of the length of the first soft ray. The overall colour is dark grey with dark spots on the scales, the internal surface of the operculum is black and there is a large black spot at the axil of the pectoral fins. The maximum published total length for the reef croaker is 30 cm (12 in), although 18 cm (7.1 in) is more typical.

== Distribution and habitat ==
Odontoscion dentex is found in the tropical Western Atlantic Ocean from Florida and Cuba to southern Brazil, although it is absent from the Bahamas. It is found within caves and crevices or in corals as depths between 1 and 30 m (3 ft 3 in and 98 ft 5 in).

== Biology ==
Odontoscion dentex is a rather shy and nocturnal species, using caves and crevices to shelter during the day. At night they emerge in small schools and feed on shrimp and small fishes.

== Conservation status ==
Odontoscion dentex has a wide distribution and in many areas where it occurs it is regarded as abundant, particularly in inshore waters in the vicinity of reefs. It is not targeted by large scale commercial fisheries and is mainly taken as bycatch or in mixed croaker fisheries by small scale fishers. The IUCN state that there are no major threats to this species and classify it as Least Concern.
