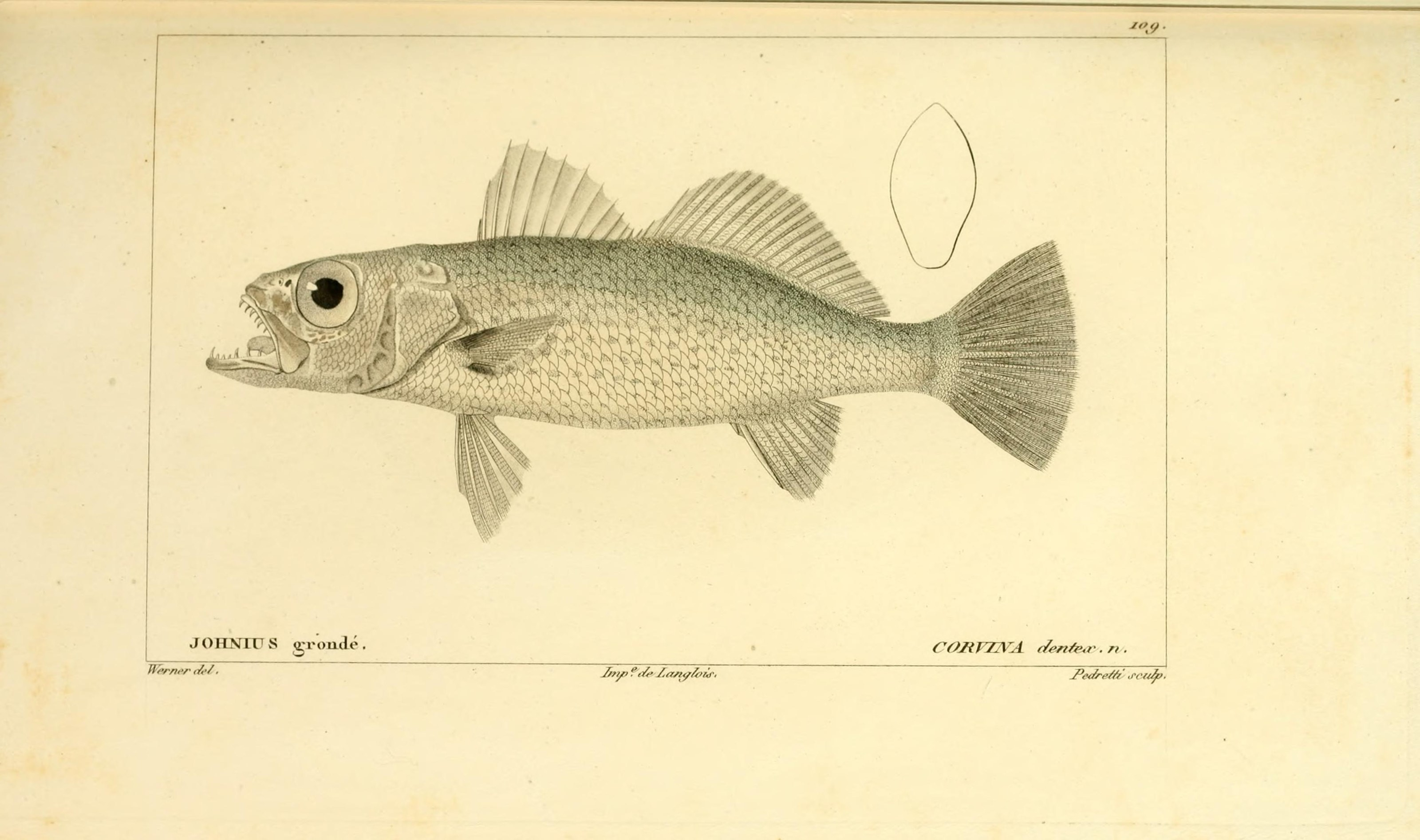
- Odontoscion dentex

Scientific classification
- Kingdom: Animalia
- Phylum: Chordata
- Class: Actinopterygii
- Order: Acanthuriformes
- Family: Sciaenidae
- Genus: Odontoscion; Gill, 1862

Type species
- Corvina dentex Cuvier, 1830

= Odontoscion =

Genus of fishes

Odontoscion is a genus of marine ray-finned fish belonging to the family Sciaenidae, the croakers and drums. These fishes are found in the Western Atlantic and Eastern Pacific Oceans.

== Taxonomy ==
Odontoscion was first proposed as a genus in 1862 by the American biologist Theodore Gill with its type species, and only species, designated as Corvina dentex which had originally been described in 1830 by Georges Cuvier from Port-au-Prince, Haiti. This genus has been placed in the subfamily Stelliferinae by some workers, but the 5th edition of Fishes of the World does not recognise subfamilies within the Sciaenidae, which it places in the order Acanthuriformes.

== Etymology ==
Odontoscion is a combination of odontos, meaning teeth, a reference to the 6 or 7 large canine-like teeth on each side of both jaws of the type species, with scion, a modern Greek name of the shi drum (Umbrina cirrosa), which Gill chose in preference to "sciaena" because he thought that it sounded better, similar to his coining of Cynoscion.

== Species ==
Odontoscion contains three valid species:

- Odontoscion dentex (Cuvier, 1830) (Reef croaker)
- Odontoscion eurymesops (Heller & Snodgrass, 1903) (Galapagos croaker)
- Odontoscion xanthops Gilbert, 1898 (Yelloweye croaker)

== Characteristics ==
Odontoscion croakers have short, rather oblong and compressed bodies, with a smoothly arched dorsal profile. They have a low head with a conical snout and a large eye. There is a small protuberance on the tip of the lower jaw. The mouth is moderately large, upwards pointing and has a protruding lower jaw. There is a row of large teeth in the front of each jaw, at least some of which may be canine-like. The snout has 8 pores and there are a further 4 or 5 pores on the chin, which does not have a barbel. The preoperculum is smooth. The dorsal fin is supported by 10 or 11 spines before the incision and by a single spine and between 23 and 26 soft rays to the rear of the incision, The anal fin has 2 spines and 8 or 9 soft rays, with the second spine being 75% of the length of the first soft ray. These fishes have maximum published total lengths of 25 cm (9.8 in) in the case of O. eurymesops and 30 cm (12 in) in the other two species.

== Distribution and habitat ==
Odontoscion are found off the Americas with a single species, O. dentex in the Western Atlantic Ocean occurring from Florida and Cuba south to Brazil. The other two species are found in the Eastern Pacific Ocean with O. eurymesops being endemic to the Galapagos Islands and Cocos Island while O. xanthops has a range which extends from the Gulf of California to Peru. One species, O. xanthops is found in shallow coastal waters and enters estuaries and the mouths of rivers, the other two species refer harder substrates such as rocks and reefs.
