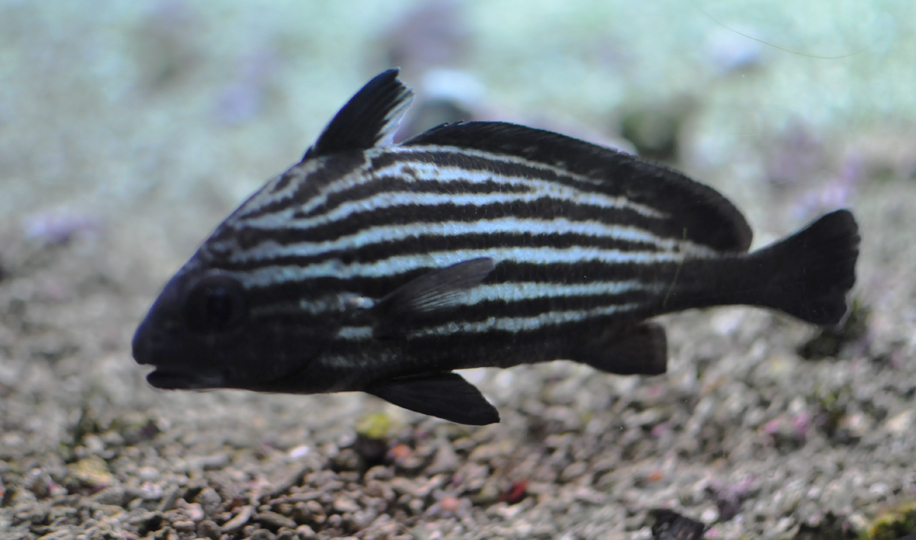

Conservation status
- Least Concern (IUCN 3.1)

Scientific classification
- Kingdom: Animalia
- Phylum: Chordata
- Class: Actinopterygii
- Order: Acanthuriformes
- Family: Sciaenidae
- Genus: Pareques
- Species: P. acuminatus

Binomial name
- Pareques acuminatus (Bloch & Schneider, 1801)

Synonyms
- Grammistes acuminatus Bloch & Schneider, 1801; Eques acuminatus (Bloch & Schneider, 1801); Equetus acuminatus (Bloch & Schneider, 1801); Eques lineatus Cuvier, 1830; Eques pulcher Steindachner, 1867; Equetus pulcher (Steindachner, 1867)

= Pareques acuminatus =

Species of fish

Pareques acuminatus, commonly known as the high-hat, donkeyfish, cubbyu, Steindachner's ribbonfish, streaked ribbonfish, striped ribbonfish or striped drum, is a species of marine ray-finned fish belonging to the genus Pareques in the family Sciaenidae, the drums and croakers. This species is found in the western Atlantic Ocean.

== Taxonomy ==
Pareques acuminatus was first formally described in 1801, based on Albertus Seba's 1759 Chaetodon, lineis fuscis, longitudinalibus, varius, by the German naturalists Marcus Elieser Bloch and Johann Gottlob Theaenus Schneider without a type locality being given. In 1876, Theodore Gill classified Grammistes acuminatus in the new monospecific genus Pareques; therefore, P. acuminatus is the type species of the genus. This species is a member of a species complex and was recognised as a separate species from the southern high-hat (Pareques lineatus).

The genus Pareques is included in the subfamily Sciaeninae by some authors, but the 5th edition of Fishes of the World does not recognise subfamilies within Sciaenidae, which it places in the order Acanthuriformes.

== Etymology ==
The specific name of the species, acuminatus, means "acute" or "pointed", an allusion to the shape of the spiny dorsal fin.

== Description ==
P. acuminatus has a deep, rhomboid body with an arched dorsal profile. The head is low and the snout protrudes beyond the mouth, with a notched upper jaw which encloses the lower jaw. The villiform teeth are arranged in bands with those in the outer row of the lower jaw being enlarged. There are no barbels on the chin but there are five pores and there are ten pores on the snout. The preoperculum has weak serrations. The long based dorsal fin has a deep notch separating the spiny and soft-rayed parts with between eight and ten spines before the notch and a single spine and between 37 and 41 soft rays behind it. The spiny part is tall with the sixth spine being the longest. The anal fin is supported by two spines, the second spine being quite thin, and seven or eight soft rays. The scales of the body are ctenoid while those on the head are cycloid, and there are thick coverings of scales on the bases of the soft-rayed part of the dorsal and anal fins. These fishes have black and white longitudinal stripes. This species has a maximum published total length of 23 centimetres (9.1 inches), although 18 centimetres (7.1 in) is more typical.

== Distribution and habitat ==
P. acuminatus is found in the western Atlantic Ocean where it occurs from North Carolina southwards through the Caribbean and Gulf of Mexico to Venezuela. It is found at depths between 60 and 70 metres (200 and 230 feet) in clear waters around tropical islands, often associated with coral reefs, as well as in nearby bays where there is a rubble substrate or the eroded borders of beds of seagrass.
