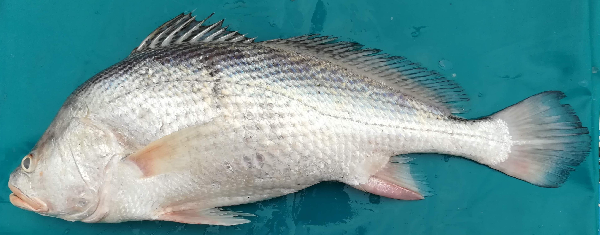

Conservation status
- Data Deficient (IUCN 3.1)

Scientific classification
- Kingdom: Animalia
- Phylum: Chordata
- Class: Actinopterygii
- Order: Acanthuriformes
- Family: Sciaenidae
- Genus: Macrospinosa; Lal Mohan, 1969
- Species: M. cuja

Binomial name
- Macrospinosa cuja (Hamilton, 1822)

Synonyms
- Bola cuja Hamilton, 1822; Johnius cujus (Hamilton, 1822); Sciaena cuja (Hamilton, 1822)

= Cuja bola =

Species of fish

The cuja bola (Macrospinosa cuja) is a species of marine ray-finned fish belonging to the family Sciaenidae, the drums and croakers. This fish is found in the northern Indian Ocean in India, Bangladesh, Myanmar and Thailand. It is the only species in the monospecific genus Macrospinosa.

== Taxonomy ==
The cuja bola was first formally described as Bola cuja in 1822 by the Scottish naturalist Francis Buchanan-Hamilton with its type locality give as the estuary of the Ganges. In 1969 the Indian zoologist R. S. Lal Mohan reclassified this species as being the only member of the monospecific genus Macrospinosa. This taxon has been placed in the subfamily Cynoscioninae by some workers, but the 5th edition of Fishes of the World does not recognise subfamilies within the Sciaenidae which it places in the order Acanthuriformes.

== Etymology ==
The cuja bola's genus name Macrospinosa means "long-spined" and is presumed to be an allusion to the long and robust second spine of the anal fin. The specific name is taken from cuja bola, its common name in the Ganges Delta.

== Description ==
The cuja bola has a deep body with a high, arched dorsal profile with a slightly oblique, terminal mouth. The second spine of the anal fin is much longer than the first. The swim bladder is shaped like a carrot with a pair of horn-like appendages at the from and these cross the transverse septum. The dorsal fin has 10 spines in the front part, then there is an incision and a single spine and between 26 and 29 soft rays to the rear of the incision. The anal fin is supported by 2 spines and 6 or 7 soft rays. The caudal fin is rhomboid. Most of the scales on the body and head are ctenoid but there are cycloid scales on the snout and just behind the eyes. The maximum published total length of this species is 152 cm (60 in). The upper body is greyish while the lower body is silvery marked with diagonal lines of dark spots above the lateral line and indistinct horizontal streaking below it.

== Distribution and habitat ==
The cuja bola is found from the Ganges Delta and Sundarbans of India and Bangladesh, at the Sittang River of Myanmar and in Thailand off Ranong Province and Krabi Province. It is partially anadromous fish which favours estuaries, coasts near river mouths and mangrove channels, even entering freshwater in tidal rivers.

== Fisheries ==
The cuja bola is targeted by fisheries in the Sundarbans of Bangladesh and Hooghly River of West Bengal during the winter. Its swimbladder is a highly valued trade item.
