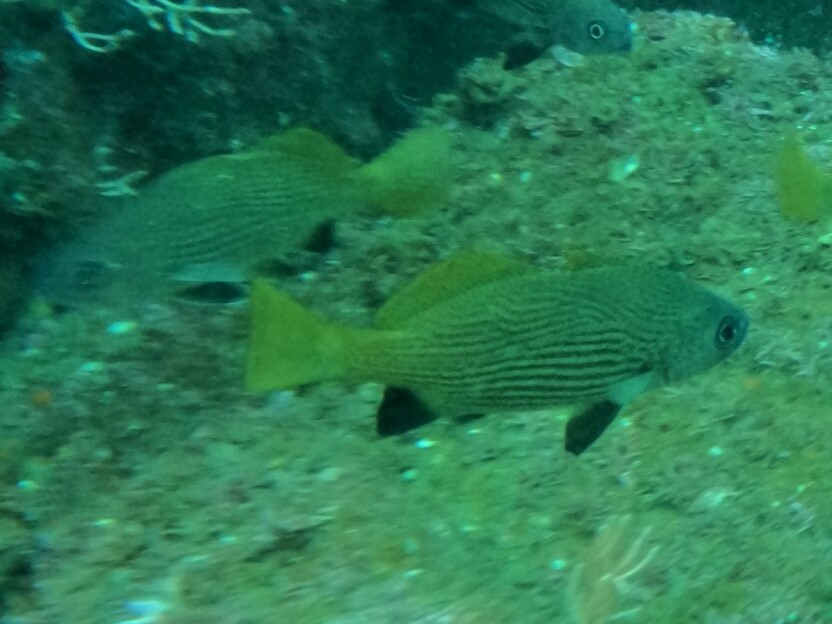
- Corvula macrops

Scientific classification
- Kingdom: Animalia
- Phylum: Chordata
- Class: Actinopterygii
- Order: Acanthuriformes
- Family: Sciaenidae
- Genus: Corvula; D. S. Jordan & C. H. Eigenmann, 1889

Type species
- Johnius batabanus Poey, 1860

= Corvula =

Genus of fishes

Corvula is a genus of marine ray-finned fishes belonging to the family Sciaenidae, the drums and croakers. These fishes are found in the western Atlantic Ocean and the central eastern Pacific Ocean.

== Taxonomy ==
Corvula was first proposed as a genus in 1889 by the American ichthyologists David Starr Jordan and Carl H. Eigenmann with Johnius batabanus designated as the type species. J. batabanus had been described in 1860 by the Cuban zoologist Felipe Poey with its type locality given as Batabanó on the southern coast of Cuba. This genus has been placed in the subfamily Stelliferinae by some workers, but the 5th edition of Fishes of the World does not recognise subfamilies within the Sciaenidae which it places in the order Acanthuriformes.

== Etymology ==
Corvula is a diminutive of crow and of Corvina, the Spanish name for Sciaenids but Corvina had already been used by Carl Wilhelm Hahn for birds in the family Campephagidae. The name may arise from the croaking noise emiited by males which sounds like the croaking of crows.

== Species ==
There are currently 3 recognized species in the genus Corvula:

- Corvula batabana Poey, 1860 (Blue croaker)
- Corvula macrops Steindachner, 1876 (Vacuocua croaker)
- Corvula sanctaeluciae Jordan, 1890 (Striped croaker)

== Characteristics ==
Corvula croakers have short heads and compressed, oblong bodies. They have moderately sized eyes and a moderately sized mouth that is a little oblique and open to the front. There are bands of small conical teeth in the jaws. There is no barbel on the chin but there are 5 pores. The preoperculum may be smooth or have small serrations and there is a notch in the angle of the gill opening. There are 2 spines and between 7 and 9 soft rays in the anal fin, the second spine is half to three quarters of the length of the first spine. The caudal fin is rounded or straight on its rear edge. Most of the scales are ctenoid but there are cycloid scales on the head. The lateral line scales extend to the tip of the caudal fin. The maximum published total lengths of these fishes is 25 to 26 cm (9.8 to 10.2 in).

== Distribution and habitat ==
Corvula croakers are found in the western Atlantic And central eastern Pacific Ocean. They are coastal fishes found in shallow waters.
