= Prickly croaker =

Conservation status
- Least Concern (IUCN 3.1)

Scientific classification
- Kingdom: Animalia
- Phylum: Chordata
- Class: Actinopterygii
- Division: Teleostei
- Order: Acanthuriformes
- Family: Sciaenidae
- Genus: Aspericorvina; Folwer, 1834
- Species: A. jubata

Binomial name
- Aspericorvina jubata (Bleeker, 1855)

Synonyms
- Corvina jubata Bleeker, 1855; Johnius jubatus (Bleeker, 1855); Johnius melanobrachium Fowler, 1934

Species of fish

The prickly croaker (Aspericorvina jubata) is a species of marine ray-finned fish belonging to the family Sciaenidae, the drums and croakers. The species is found in the Indo-West Pacific around southeast Asia. It is the only species in the monospecific genus Aspericorvina.

== Taxonomy ==
The prickly croaker was first formally described as Corvina jubata in 1855 by the Dutch physician, herpetologist and ichthyologist Pieter Bleeker with its type locality given as Bandjarmasin on Borneo in Indonesia. In 1934 Henry Weed Fowler described a new species, Johnius melanobrachium, from Bangkok, and classified it in a new subgenus of Johnius he named Aspericorvina. Subsequently, Weed's Johnius melanobrachium was found to be a junior synonym of Bleeker's Corvina jubata but Weed's genus was classified as a valid genus. This fish belongs to the family Sciaenidae in the order Acanthuriformes.

== Etymology ==
The prickly croaker's genus name, Aspericorvina is a combination of asper, meaning "rough", an allusion to the small spiny scales on the top of the head, in front of the dorsal fin and on the belly, with corvina, the Spanish name for sciaenids and an early generic name, Corvina Cuvier, 1829, used in the Sciaenidae but this was preoccupied by Corvina Hahn, 1822 in birds. The specific name jubata means "fringed" like a mane, a reference to the prominent bunches of bristle like teeth on the scales of the neck and the crown, giving them the appearance of a brush.

== Description ==
The prickly croaker is a small species of sciaenid that has a moderately deep body. They have a blunt, rounded snout which projects a little beyond the upper jaw. The mouth is small and horizontal with the upper jaw extending back as far as the middle or rear edge of the pupil There are large and small teeth in the upper jaw with no canine-like teeth. The larger teeth form an outer series with the largest at the front of the jaw. The lower jaw has a band of villiform teeth. The dorsal fin has 10 spines, in front of an incision with a single spine and 22 to 25 soft rays to the rear of the incision. The anal fin is supported by 2 spines and between 7 and 9 soft rays. The caudal fin is rhomboidal in shape. There are ctenoid scales on the head, back, throat and belly each with 5 or 6 strong projecting spinules on the rear margin. Elsewhere, the scales are cycloid The swim bladder is shaped like a carrot and has roughly 16 pairs of appendages along its sides. The colour of the body is silvery, darkened on the back and there is a dark spot on the operculum. This species reaches a maximum standard length of 16 cm (6.3 in).

== Distribution and habitat ==
The prickly croaker is found in the eastern Indian and western Pacific Oceans where it occurs in the Andaman Sea, Gulf of Thailand, Peninsular Malaya, Sumatra, Kalimantan and parts of the South China Sea. It occurs in shallow water along coasts, in estuaries and in mangrove swamps normally on soft muddy or sandy mud substrates.

== Biology ==
The prickly croaker has a diet dominated by zooplankton which makes up more than three-quarters of the items consumed.
