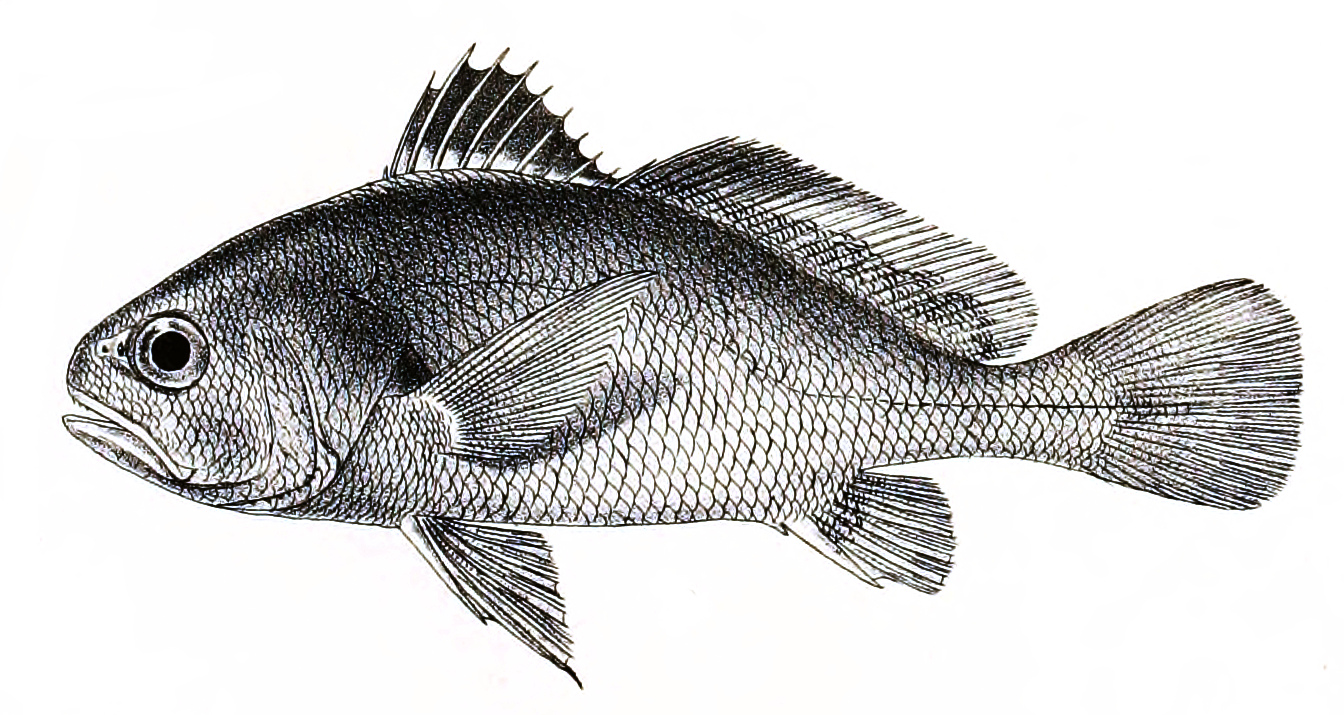

Conservation status
- Least Concern (IUCN 3.1)

Scientific classification
- Kingdom: Animalia
- Phylum: Chordata
- Class: Actinopterygii
- Order: Acanthuriformes
- Family: Sciaenidae
- Genus: Kathala; Lal Mohan, 1969
- Species: K. axillaris

Binomial name
- Kathala axillaris (Cuvier, 1830)

Synonyms
- Corvina axillaris Cuvier, 1830; Pseudosciaena axillaris (Cuvier, 1830); Sciaena axillaris (Cuvier, 1830)

= Kathala croaker =

Species of fish

The kathala croaker (Kathala axillaris) is a species of marine ray-finned fish belonging to the family Sciaenidae, the drums and croakers. This species is found in the Indian Ocean off South Asia. It is the only species in the monospecific genus Kathala.

== Taxonomy ==
The kathala croaker was first formally described as Corvina axillaris in 1830 by the French zoologist Georges Cuvier with its type locality given as Malabar in India. In 1969 R. S. Lal Mohan proposed the monospecific genus Kathala for this species. This taxon has been placed in the subfamily Cynoscioninae by some workers, but the 5th edition of Fishes of the World does not recognise subfamilies within the Sciaenidae which it places in the order Acanthuriformes.

== Etymology ==
The kathala croaker's genus name, was not explained by Lal Mohan but the name was recorded in 1801 by Patrick Russell in his Two Hundred Fishes: Collected at Vizagapatam on the Coast of Coromandel as a local name in India for this species and other members of the Sciaenidae. The specific name axillaris refers to a black mark over the base of the pectoral fin.

== Description ==
The kathala croaker has a body which has a depth which is almost equal to the length of its head. The caudal fin may be convex or truncate and has rounded corners. It has a carrot-shaped swimbladder with a pair of simple appendages at its head end. The dorsal fin is divided by a deep incision, forward of the incision it is supported by 10 spines and to the rear of the incision there is a single spine and between 26 and 28 soft rays. The anal fin is supported by 2 spines and 7 soft rays while the pectoral fins contain 17 or 18 rays. The standard length is 2.8 to 3.3 times the body's depth. There are small, cycloid scales on the head and similarly sized cteniod scales on the body. The back is greyish-green and the sides are silvery-yellow. The anterior part of the dorsal fin is black and there is a black blotch above the base of the pectoral fin. This species has a maximum published total length of 27 cm (11 in), although 18 cm (7.1 in) is more typical.

== Distribution and habitat ==
The kathala croakeris found in the northern Indian Ocean where it occurs along the coasts of Pakistan, India, Sri Lanka, Bangladesh and Myanmar. It is found at depths down to 70 m (230 ft) in shallow coastal and estuarine waters with substrates of mixed sand and mud.
