= Megalonibea =

Scientific classification
- Kingdom: Animalia
- Phylum: Chordata
- Class: Actinopterygii
- Order: Acanthuriformes
- Family: Sciaenidae
- Genus: Megalonibea; Chu, Lo & Wu, 1963
- Species: M. fusca

Binomial name
- Megalonibea fusca Chu, Lo & Wu, 1963

Genus of ray-finned fishes

Megalonibea is a monospecific genus of marine ray-finned fish belonging to the family Sciaenidae, the drums and croakers. Its only species is Megalonibea fusca which is found in the East China Sea. Although recognised as a valid taxon by FishBase, Catalog of Fishes mentions that it may be a synonym of Protonibea, however, as Protonibea was proposed as a genus by Ethelwynn Trewavas in 1973 that name would be a junior synonym of Megalonibea, and it is treated as such by other authors.
