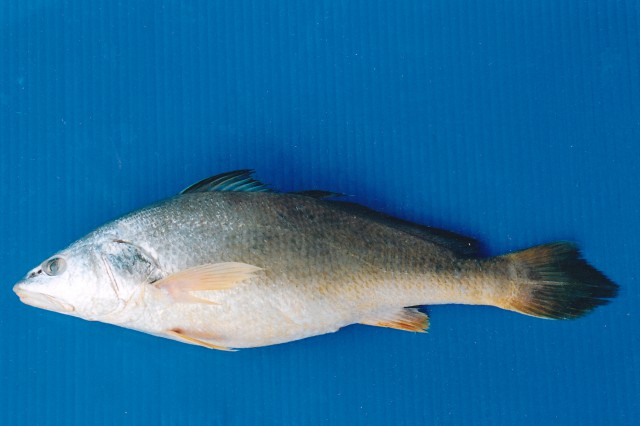

Conservation status
- Least Concern (IUCN 3.1)

Scientific classification
- Kingdom: Animalia
- Phylum: Chordata
- Class: Actinopterygii
- Order: Acanthuriformes
- Family: Sciaenidae
- Genus: Chrysochir; Trewavas & Yazdani, 1966
- Species: C. aureus

Binomial name
- Chrysochir aureus (Richardson, 1846)

Synonyms
- Otolithus aureus Richardson, 1846; Sciaena ophiceps Alcock, 1889; Johnius ophiceps (Alcock, 1889); Sciaena incerta Vinciguerra, 1926; Johnius birtwistlei Fowler, 1931; Pseudosciaena acuta Tang, 1937; Nibea acuta (Tang, 1937)

= Reeve's croaker =

Species of fish

Reeve's croaker (Chrysochir aureus), also known as the goldbelly croaker, golden corvina, yellowfin croaker or yellowfin corvina, is a species of marine ray-finned fish belonging to the family Sciaenidae, the drums and croakers. This species is found in the coastal waters of the Indo-Pacific region. It is the only species in the monospecific genus Chrysochir.

== Taxonomy ==
Reeve's croaker was first formally described as Otolithus aureus by the Scottish naval surgeon, naturalist and explorer John Richardson with its type locality given as Canton in China. In 1966 Ethelwynn Trewavas and G. M. Yazdani classified Reeve's croaker within the monospecific genus Chrysochir. This species belongs to the family Sciaenidae in the order Acanthuriformes. Nibea acuta is treated as a synonym of Chrysochir aureus in FishBase, but other authorities treat this taxon as a valid species.

== Etymology ==
Reeve's croaker was described by Richardson based on a drawing by the naturalist John Reeves hence the English common name, although it should be Reeves's croaker. Chrysochir, the genus name, is a compound of chrysos, meaning "gold", and cheiros, which means "hand", an allusion to the golden yellow pectoral fin of this species. The specific name aureus means "golden" which is either a reference to the golden pectoral fin or is a Latin transliteration of its Chinese names, "Gold scale hwo" and "Golden-scaled han".

== Description ==
Reeve's croaker is a slender-bodies, medium sized species of sciaenid with a maximum published total length of 30 cm (12 in). It has an acutely pointed snout which projects in front of the upper jaw. The large mouth is almost horizontal with the upper jaw extending to below the rear margin of the eye. There are 3 pores on the upper snout and 5 along the sides and 3 pairs of mental pores. There are large and small teeth in each jaw, the large teeth forming the outer rows in the upper jaw, with 1 or 2 pairs of canine-like teeth that are over twice as long as the other enlarged teeth at tip of jaw. In the lower jaw the larger teeth are in the inner rows and there are no canine-like teeth. The front part of the dorsal fin is supported by 10 spines, then there is a notch and the second part is supported by a single spine and between 25 and 29 soft rays. The anal fin is supported by 2 spines and 6 or 7 soft rays. The caudal fin is pointed. Most of the body is covered in ctenoid scales except for the snout and beneath the eye where they are cycloid. The scales of the lateral line extend to the tip of the caudal fin. The swim bladder is shaped like a carrot and has 27 to 30 pairs of fan-shaped appendages along its sides, none of which enter the head. The colour is metallic blue on the back and flanks, fading to silvery on the lower body. There are diagonal streaks on the scale rows on the back. The pectoral fins are yellow, while the other fins grey with tints of orange.

== Distribution and habitat ==
Reeve's croaker is found in the Indo-West Pacific where it occurs from Sri Lanka, along the coasts of the Bay of Bengal and Southeast Asia, to southern China and Taiwan and south to Malaysia and Indonesia. This species is found at depths between 11 and 64 m (36 and 210 ft) in shallow, coastal areas in both brackish and marine waters.

== Biology ==
Reeve's croaker feeeds on crustaceans. In Taiwan, the females reach sexual maturity at lengths of roughly 25 cm (9.8 in) and spawning runs from June to December. Adults gather in large schools in turbid waters over mud substrates and local fishermen have reported seeing them in freshwater.

== Fisheries ==
Reeve's croaker is a target for fisheries wherever it occurs and in some areas it fetches high prices. The flesh is sold fresh or salted.
