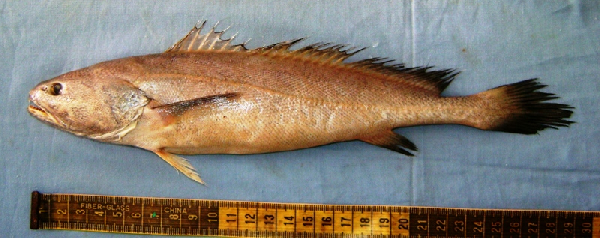
- Bronze croaker (Otolithoides biauritus)

Scientific classification
- Kingdom: Animalia
- Phylum: Chordata
- Class: Actinopterygii
- Order: Acanthuriformes
- Family: Sciaenidae
- Genus: Otolithoides; Fowler, 1933

Type species
- Otolithus biauritus Cantor, 1849

Species
- see text

Synonyms
- Pama Fowler, 1933; Sciaenoides Blyth, 1860

= Otolithoides =

Small genus of marine ray-finned fishes

Otolithoides is a small genus of marine ray-finned fishes belonging to the family Sciaenidae, the drums and croakers. The two recognised species in the genus are found in the Indo-West Pacific region.

== Species ==
Otolithoides contains two described, recognised species:

- Otolithoides biauritus Cantor, 1849 (Bronze croaker)
- Otolithoides pama Hamilton, 1822 (Pama croaker)
