= Pseudolarimichthys =

Conservation status
- Least Concern (IUCN 3.1)

Scientific classification
- Kingdom: Animalia
- Phylum: Chordata
- Class: Actinopterygii
- Order: Acanthuriformes
- Family: Sciaenidae
- Genus: Pseudolarimichthys; Lo, Liu, Mohd Nor & Chen, 2017
- Species: P. terengganui

Binomial name
- Pseudolarimichthys terengganui (Seah, Hanafi, Mazlan & Chao, 2015)

Synonyms
- Larimichthys terengganui Seah, Hanafi, Mazlan & Chao, 2015

Genus of ray-finned fish

Pseudolarimichthys is a monospecific genus of marine ray-finned fish belonging to the family Sciaenidae the drums and croakers. The only species in the genus is Pseudolarimichthys terengganui, a species described in 2015 as Larimichthys terengganui from Terengganu on the east coast of Peninsular Malaysia.
