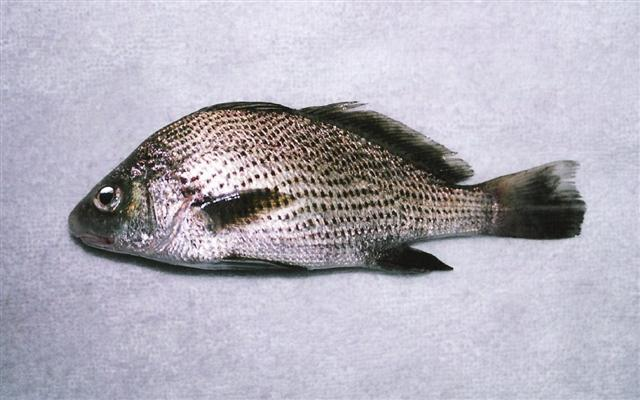
- Black croaker (Cheilotrema saturnum)

Scientific classification
- Kingdom: Animalia
- Phylum: Chordata
- Class: Actinopterygii
- Order: Acanthuriformes
- Family: Sciaenidae
- Genus: Cheilotrema; Tschudi, 1846

Type species
- Cheilotrema fasciatum Tschudi, 1846

Synonyms
- Rhinoscion Gill, 1861

= Cheilotrema =

Genus of fishes

Cheilotrema is a genus of marine ray-finned fishes belonging to the family Sciaenidae, the drums and croakers. These fishes are found in the eastern Pacific Ocean.

== Taxonomy ==
Cheilotrema was first proposed as a monospecific genus in 1861 by the Swiss naturalist and explorer Johann Jakob von Tschudi. Tschudi was describing a new species from Peru, Cheilotrema fasciatum, and created the new genus for it. Cheilotrema belongs to the family Sciaenidae in the order Acanthuriformes.

== Etymology ==
Cheilotrema combines cheilos, meaning "lip", with trema, which means "pore", an allusion to the obvious pores on the upper lip of C. fasciatum.

== Species ==
Cheilotrema has two recognised species classified within it:

- Cheilotrema fasciatum Tschudi, 1864 (Arnillo drum, Burro)
- Cheilotrema saturnum (Girard, 1858) (Black croaker)

== Characteristics ==
Cheilotrema croakers have deep, oblong shaped bodies with a sloped head and pointed snout. The mouth is just below the snout and there are 5 pores on the chin but no barbels. The preoperculum may have either a serrated or smooth margin. The dorsal fin has a deep incision dividing it and there are 10 spines to the front of the incision and a single spine and between 24 and 28 soft rays to its rear. The short anal spine is supported by 2 spines, the second spine being robust and equal in length to the first soft rays, and between 6 and 9 soft rays. The pectoral fins are short and the caudal fin is truncate> the body is covered in ctenoid scales apart from around the eyes where there are cycloid scales. The inner third of the soft rayed part of the dorsal fin and the inner three quarters of the anal fin are scaled. The largest species is the black croaker (C. saturnum) which has a maximum published total length of 45 cm (18 in) while that of the Arnillo drum (C. fasciatum) is 36.1 cm (14.2 in).

== Distribution and habitat ==
Cheilotrema croakers are found in the eastern Pacific Ocean, the black croaker is found off western North America off California south to southern Baja California and in the northern Gulf of California. The arnillo drum is found off the western coast of South America from northern Peru to Chile, and around the Galapagos Islands of Ecuador. The black croaker is a demersal fish that is frequently observed in caves and crevices of exposed coasts and open bays in California down to depths of 100 m (330 ft). The allopatric population which inhabits the northern Gulf of California is found over sandy/muddy bottoms. The arnillo drum is described as a sublittoral, demersal fish inhabiting cool waters.

== Conservation status ==
Cheilotrema croakers are classified by the IUCN, the black croaker is classified as Least Concern, although the population in the Gulf of California is threatened by being taken is bycatch in the shrimp trawl and gillnet fisheries there, and there is no information about fisheries for the arnillo drum so it is classified as Data Deficient.
