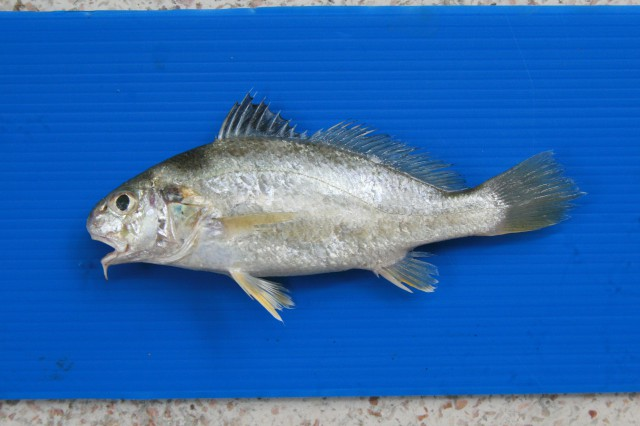

Conservation status
- Least Concern (IUCN 3.1)

Scientific classification
- Kingdom: Animalia
- Phylum: Chordata
- Class: Actinopterygii
- Order: Acanthuriformes
- Family: Sciaenidae
- Genus: Dendrophysa; Trewavas, 1964
- Species: D. russelii

Binomial name
- Dendrophysa russelii (Cuvier, 1829)

Synonyms
- Umbrina russelii Cuvier, 1829; Sciaena russelli (Cuvier, 1829); Umbrina kuhlii Cuvier, 1830

= Goatee croaker =

Species of ray-finned fish

The goatee croaker (Dendrophysa russelii) is a species of marine ray-finned fish belonging to the family Sciaenidae, the drums and croakers. It is the only species in the monospecific genus Dendrophysa. This species is found in the Indian Ocean and western Pacific Ocean along the coasts of southern and southeast Asia.
