= Robalo drum =

Conservation status
- Data Deficient (IUCN 3.1)

Scientific classification
- Kingdom: Animalia
- Phylum: Chordata
- Class: Actinopterygii
- Order: Acanthuriformes
- Family: Sciaenidae
- Genus: Robaloscion; Béarez & Schwarzhans, 2014
- Species: R. wieneri

Binomial name
- Robaloscion wieneri (Sauvage, 1883)

Synonyms
- Sciaena wieneri Sauvage, 1883; Sciaena gilberti Starks, 1906; Sciaena starksi Evermann & Radcliffe, 1917

Species of ray-finned fish

The robalo drum (Robaloscion wieneri) is a species of marine ray-finned fish belonging to the family Sciaenidae, the drums and croakers. It is the only member of the monospecific genus Robaloscion. This species is native to Southeast Pacific. This species is found off the coast of Peru.
