= Estuary croaker =

Conservation status
- Least Concern (IUCN 3.1)

Scientific classification
- Kingdom: Animalia
- Phylum: Chordata
- Class: Actinopterygii
- Order: Acanthuriformes
- Family: Sciaenidae
- Genus: Sonorolux
- Species: S. fluminis

Binomial name
- Sonorolux fluminis Trewavas, 1977

Species of ray-finned fish

The estuary croaker (Sonorolux fluminis) is a species of ray-finned fish belonging to the family Sciaenidae, the drums and croakers. It is the only species in the monospecific genus Sonorolux. The estuary croaker is found in estuaries in Sarawak on Borneo.
