= Bluestreak drum =

Conservation status
- Least Concern (IUCN 3.1)

Scientific classification
- Kingdom: Animalia
- Phylum: Chordata
- Class: Actinopterygii
- Order: Acanthuriformes
- Family: Sciaenidae
- Genus: Elattarchus; Jordan & Evermann, 1896
- Species: E. archidium

Binomial name
- Elattarchus archidium (Jordan & Gilbert, 1882)

Synonyms
- Odontoscion archidium Jordan & Gilbert, 1882; Odontoscion australis Hildebrand, 1946

Species of fish

The bluestreak drum (Elattarchus archidium), also known as the bluish croaker, is a species of marine ray-finned fish belonging to the family Sciaenidae, the drums and croakers. It is the only species in the monospecific genus Elattarchus. This species is found in the central eastern Pacific Ocean along the coasts of the Americas.

== Taxonomy ==
The bluestreak drum was first formally described as Odontoscion archidium in 1882 by the American ichthyologists David Starr Jordan and Charles Henry Gilbertwith its type locality given as Panama Bay. In 1896Jordan and Barton Warren Evermann reclassified the species within the monospecific genus Elattarchus. This genus has been placed in the subfamily Stelliferinae by some workers, but the 5th edition of Fishes of the World does not recognise subfamilies within the Sciaenidae which it places in the order Acanthuriformes.

== Description ==
The bluestreak drum has a moderately elongate and compressed body with a blunt snout. The eye is moderately large but the mouth is large and slopes upwards. There are no barbels on the chin but there are 5 pores there. There is a row of canine-like teeth on each jaw with an enlarged pair at the front of the lower jaw. There are between 5 and 7 spines at the angle of the preoperculum with the lowest spine pointing downwards or marginally to the front. The dorsal fin is incised and is supported by 10 spines before the incision and a single spine and between 24 and 28 soft rays to its rear. The anal fin has 2 spines and 8 or 9 soft rays, with the 2=second spine being long at three quarters of the length of the first ray. The pectoral fins are long, and extend beyond the flattened pelvic fins. The rear margin of the caudal fin is straight. There are ctenoid scales on the body with cycloid scales on the head. the lateral line has between 47 and 56 pored scales. The upper body is bluish-gray and this fades into silvery on the lower body. There is a black blotch near the top of the operculum. Some specimens show dark diagonal stripes on along the flanks. The anal and pectoral fins are transparent to yellowish and the first part of the dorsal fin has a dusky edge. This species has a maximum published total length of 43.9 cm (17.3 in), although 15 cm (5.9 in) is more typical.

== Distribution and habitat ==
The bluestreak drum is found in the central eastern Pacific Ocean from Magdalena Bay in Baja California Sur, into the Gulf of California and south as far as northern Peru. It is a demersal fish occurring in sandy bays, in lagoons and in estuaries as deep as 60 m (200 ft). Juveniles gather in large schools in the vicinity of rocky reefs.

== Biology ==
The bluestreak drum feeds on crustaceans and fish larvae but its biology is otherwise little known.
