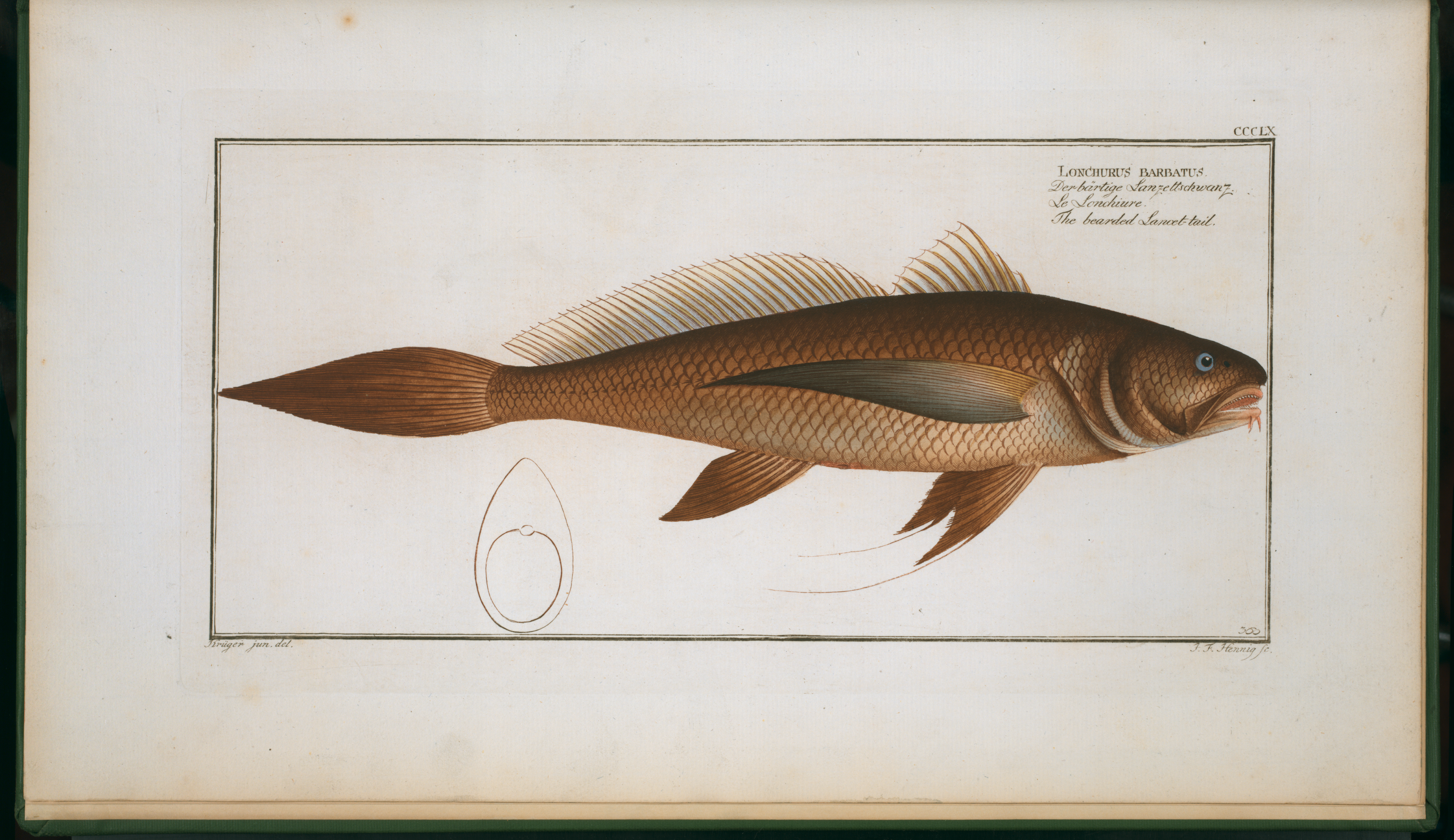
- Lonchurus lanceolatus

Scientific classification
- Kingdom: Animalia
- Phylum: Chordata
- Class: Actinopterygii
- Order: Acanthuriformes
- Family: Sciaenidae
- Genus: Lonchurus; Bloch, 1793

Type species
- Lonchurus barbatus Bloch, 1793

Species
- see text

= Lonchurus =

Genus of ray-finned fishes

Lonchurus is a genus of marine ray-finned fishes belonging to the family Sciaenidae, the drums and croakers. These fishes are found in the Western Atlantic.

== Taxonomy ==
Lonchurus was first proposed as a genus in 1793 by the German physician and naturalist Marcus Elieser Bloch when he described Lonchurus barbatus from Suriname. Subsequently L. barbatus was found to be a synonym of Bloch's 1788 species, Perca lanceolatus. This genus has been placed in the subfamily Micropogoninae by some workers, but the 5th edition of Fishes of the World does not recognise subfamilies within the Sciaenidae which it places in the order Acanthuriformes.

== Etymology ==
Lonchurus means "spear tail" and refers to the pointed, lance like tail of L. lanceolatus.

== Species ==
Lonchurus contains the following species:

- Lonchurus elegans (Boeseman, 1948) (Blackfin croaker)
- Lonchurus lanceolatus (Bloch, 1788) (Longtail croaker)

Some authorities classify the blackfin croaker (L. elegans) in the genus Paralonchurus and treat Lonchurus as a monospecific genus.

== Characteristics ==
Lonchurus croakers have a elongate, slightly compressed body with a long head. They have small eyes and a cone-shape snout which protrudes past the horizontal mouth. There are between 1 and 15 pairs of mental barbels, as well as 4 or 5 pores, on the chin. The margin of the preoperculum is not serrated and there is a notch on the upper angle of the operculum. The dorsal fin is supported by 10 or 11 spines and between 31 and 39 rays. They have a very long, pointed pectoral fin and the caudal fin is pointed too. The anal fin is supported by a pair of weak spins and between 6 and 9 soft rays. These fishes reach a maximum published total length of 32 cm (13 in).

== Distribution and habitat ==
Lonchurus croakers are found in the Western Atlantic Ocean off the western coast of South America and in the Windward Islands. They are coastal and estuarine fishes found over sand, mud and mixed sand and mud bottoms.

== Utilisation and conservation status ==
Lonchurus croakers are caught as food fish. They are mainly taken as bycatch. The IUCN have too little information on the population, ecology, distribution and threats of L. elegans and classify it as Data Deficient. They classify L. lanceloatus as being of Least Concern.
