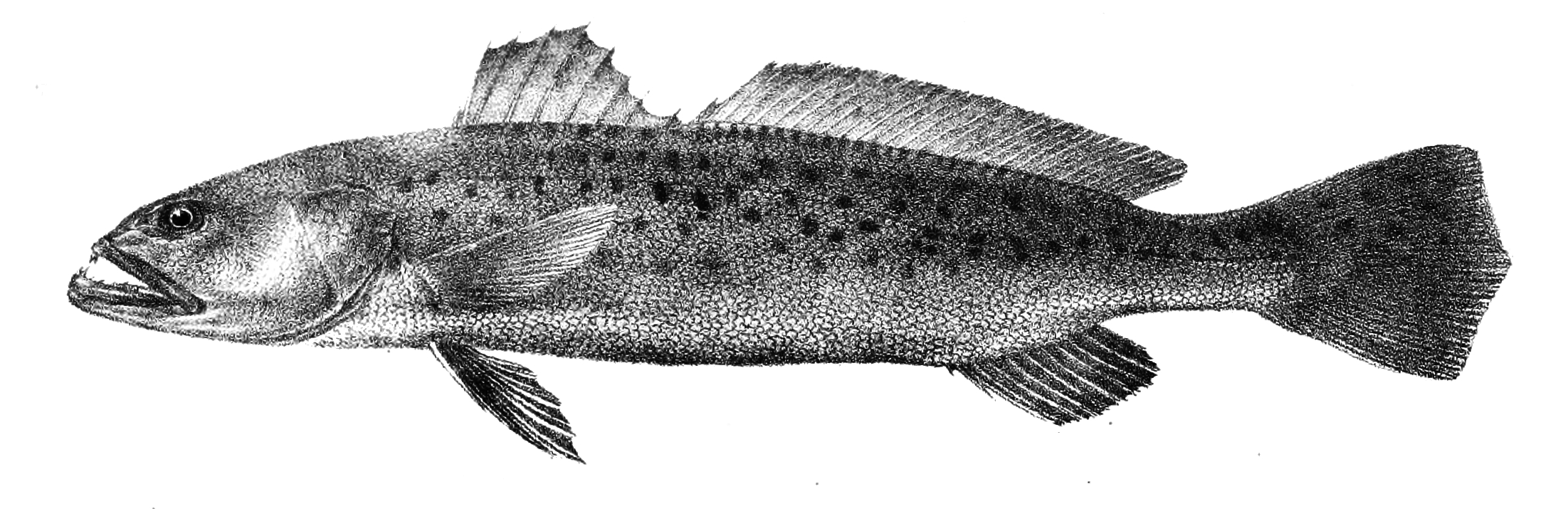
- Pterotolithus maculatus

Scientific classification
- Kingdom: Animalia
- Phylum: Chordata
- Class: Actinopterygii
- Order: Acanthuriformes
- Family: Sciaenidae
- Genus: Pterotolithus; Fowler, 1933

Type species
- Otolithus maculatus Cuvier, 1830

= Pterotolithus =

Genus of ray-finned fishes

Pterotolithus is a genus of marine ray-finned fish belonging to the family Sciaenidae, the drums and croakers. These fishes are found in the Indo-Pacific region.

== Species ==
Pterotolithus as the following valid species classified within it:

- Pterotolithus lateoides (Bleeker, 1849) (Bigmouth croaker)
- Pterotolithus maculatus (Cuvier, 1830) (Blotched tiger-toothed croaker)
