= Lonchurus elegans =

Conservation status
- Data Deficient (IUCN 3.1)

Scientific classification
- Kingdom: Animalia
- Phylum: Chordata
- Class: Actinopterygii
- Order: Acanthuriformes
- Family: Sciaenidae
- Genus: Lonchurus
- Species: L. elegans

Binomial name
- Lonchurus elegans (Boeseman, 1948)

Synonyms
- Paralonchurus elegans Boeseman, 1948

Species of ray-finned fish

Lonchurus elegans, the blackfin croaker, is a species of marine ray-finned fish belonging to the family Sciaenidae, the drums and croakers. This species is found in the Western Atlantic, from Colombia to Brazil.

This species reaches a length of 32.0 cm (12.6 in)

== See also ==
- List of data deficient fishes
