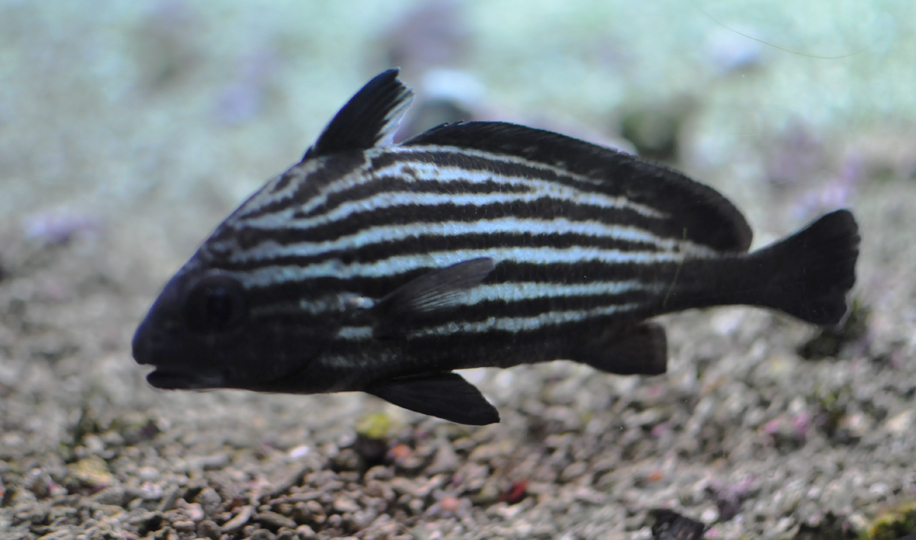
- Pareques acuminatus

Scientific classification
- Kingdom: Animalia
- Phylum: Chordata
- Class: Actinopterygii
- Order: Acanthuriformes
- Family: Sciaenidae
- Genus: Pareques; Gill in Goode, 1876

Type species
- Grammistes acuminatus Bloch & Schneider, 1801

Species
- See article

= Pareques =

Genus of fishes

Pareques is a genus of marine ray-finned fishes belonging to the family Sciaenidae, the drums and croakers. These fishes are found in the western Atlantic Ocean and eastern Pacific Ocean.

== Taxonomy ==
Pareques was first proposed as a monospecific genus in 1876 by the American biologist Theodore Gill with Grammistes acuminatus as its only species. G. acuminatus was first formally described in 1801 by Marcus Elieser Bloch and Johann Gottlob Theaenus Schneider, although they did not give a type locality. The genus Pareques has been placed in the subfamily Sciaeninae by some authors, but the 5th edition of Fishes of the World does not recognise subfamilies within the Sciaenidae which it places in the order Acanthuriformes.

== Etymology ==
Pareques means "near to Eques".

== Species ==
The species of this genus are:

- Pareques acuminatus (Bloch & Schneider, 1801), high-hat
- Pareques fuscovittatus (Kendall & Radcliffe, 1912), fusco drum
- Pareques iwamotoi Miller & Woods, 1988, blackbar drum
- Pareques lanfeari (Barton, 1947), royal high-hat
- Pareques lineatus (Cuvier, 1830), southern high-hat
- Pareques perissa (Heller & Snodgrass, 1903), odd high-hat
- Pareques umbrosus (Jordan & C. H. Eigenmann, 1889), cubbyu
- Pareques viola (Gilbert, 1898), gungo high-hat

== Characteristics ==
Pareques croakers possess deep, oblong-shaped bodies with a snout that protrudes past the inferior mouth. There is a notch in the upper jaw and the lower jaw is completely hidden by the upper when the mouth is closed. There are five pores on the chin but no barbels and the preoperculum has small serrations. They have a long based dorsal fin which is split into two parts, the first is spiny and is tall, but its height is less than the length of the head. The second part of the dorsal fin is supported by between 38 and 44 soft rays and the short based anal fin is supported by two spines and seven or eight soft rays. The scales of the body are ctenoid while those on the head are cycloid and there are thick coverings of scales on the bases of the soft-rayed part of the dorsal and anal fins. The largest of these fishes is the royal high-hat (P. lanfeari) with a maximum published total length of 40 centimetres (16 inches), while the smallest is the fusco drum (P. fuscovittatus) with a maximum published total length of 20 cm (7.9 in).

== Distribution ==
Pareques croakers are found in the eastern Pacific Ocean and the western Atlantic Ocean. In the Pacific, four species range from the Gulf of California south to Peru, with one species, the odd high-hat (P. perissa), being endemic to the Galápagos Islands. In the western Atlantic, the species range from Chesapeake Bay south to Santa Catarina, Brazil.
