= Pseudoumbrina =

Pseudoumbrina Temporal range: Pliocene

Scientific classification
- Domain: Eukaryota
- Kingdom: Animalia
- Phylum: Chordata
- Class: Actinopterygii
- Order: Perciformes
- Genus: †Pseudoumbrina; Menner, 1948

Extinct genus of fishes

Pseudoumbrina is an extinct genus of prehistoric bony fish that lived during the Pliocene epoch.

== See also ==
- Prehistoric fish
- List of prehistoric bony fish
