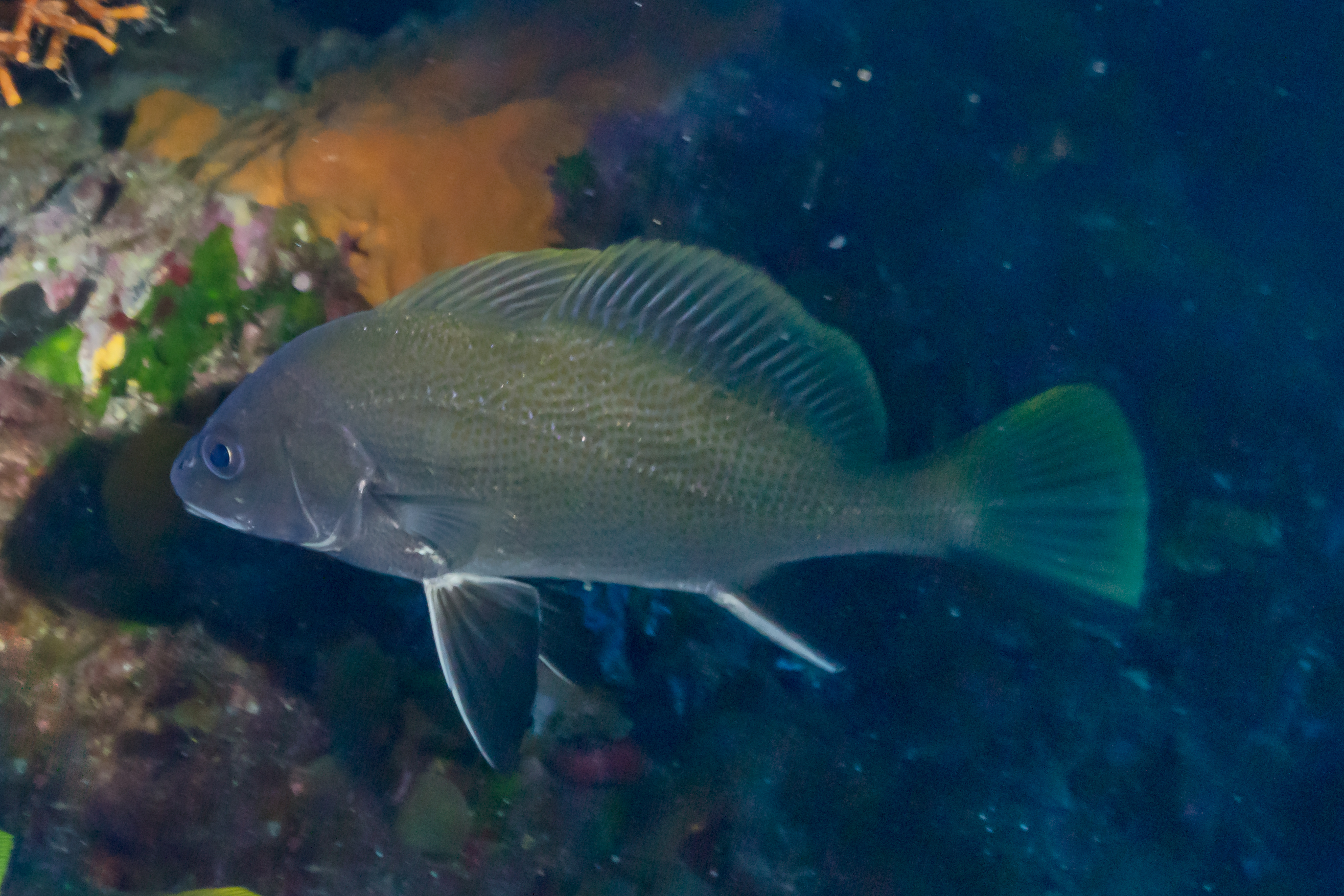
- Brown meagre (Sciaena umbra), Gozo, Malta - Sciaenidae
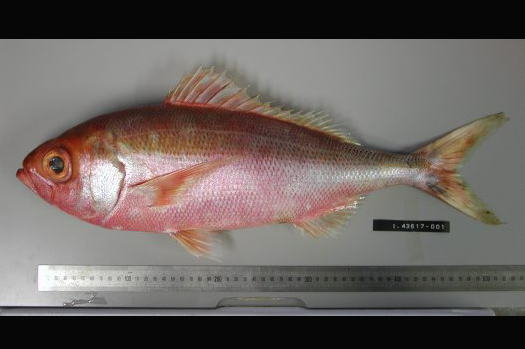
- Rubyfish (Plagiogeneion rubiginosum) - Emmelichtyidae

Scientific classification
- Kingdom: Animalia
- Phylum: Chordata
- Class: Actinopterygii
- Order: Acanthuriformes
- Suborder: Sciaenoidei; Cuvier, 1828

Families
- see text

= Sciaenoidei =

Suborder of ray-finned fishes

Sciaenoidei is a suborder of ray-finned fishes belonging to the order Acanthuriformes.

== Taxonomy ==
The suborder was first proposed in 1828 by the French zoologist Georges Cuvier. The 5th edition of Fishes of the World classifies the suborder in the order Acanthuriformes. Other authorities classify the Sciaenidae and the Emmelichthyidae as incertae sedis within the series Eupercaria. The Catalog of Fishes retains this family within the Acanthuriformes but does not recognise the suborder Sciaenoidei.

== Families ==
Sciaenoidei comprises 2 families:

- Emmelichthyidae Poey, 1967 (Rovers, rubyfishes and bonnetmouths)
- Sciaenidae Cuvier, 1829 (Drums and croakers)
