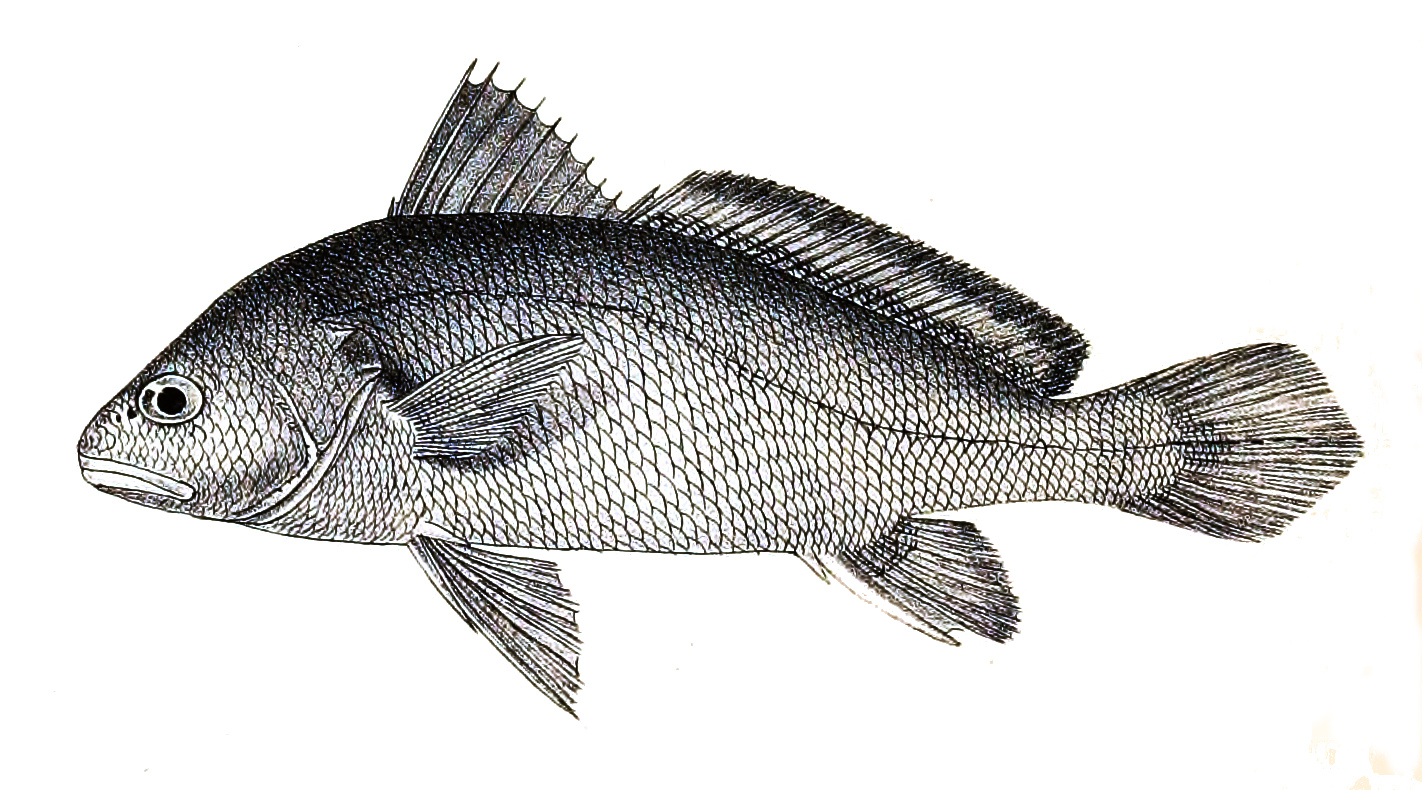
- Illustrated plate of Nibea soldado by George Henry Ford.

Scientific classification
- Kingdom: Animalia
- Phylum: Chordata
- Class: Actinopterygii
- Order: Acanthuriformes
- Family: Sciaenidae
- Genus: Nibea; Jordan & Thompson, 1911

Type species
- Pseudotolithus mitsukurii Jordan & Snyder, 1900

Species
- See text

= Nibea =

Genus of fishes

Nibea is a genus of marine ray-finned fishes belonging to the family Sciaenidae, the drums and croakers. The species in this genus are found in the Indo-West Pacific region.

== Taxonomy ==
Nibea was first proposed as a genus in 1911 by the American ichthyologists David Starr Jordan & William Francis Thompson with Pseudotolithus mitsukurii designated as its type species. P. mitsukurii had originally been described in 1900 by Jordan and John Otterbein Snyder with its type locality given as Tokyo Bay, Japan. This taxon has been placed in the subfamily Otolithinae by some workers, but the 5th edition of Fishes of the World does not recognise subfamilies within the Sciaenidae which it places in the order Acanthuriformes.

== Etymology ==
Nibea is derived from a Japanese word referring to large Sciaenids and for the isinglass, manufactured from their swim bladders, used in binding bamboo rods together.

== Species ==
Nibea contains ten accepted species:

- Nibea albiflora (Richardson, 1846) (Yellow drum)
- Nibea chui Trewavas, 1971 (Chu's croaker)
- Nibea coibor (Hamilton, 1822)
- Nibea leptolepis (Ogilby, 1918) (Smallscale croaker)
- Nibea maculata (Bloch & Schneider, 1801) (Blotched croaker)
- Nibea microgenys Sasaki, 1992 (Small-jaw croaker)
- Nibea mitsukurii (Jordan & Snyder, 1900) (Honnibe croaker)
- Nibea semifasciata Chu, Lo & Wu, 1963 (Sharpnose croaker)
- Nibea soldado (Lacépède, 1802) (Soldier croaker)
- Nibea squamosa Sasaki, 1992 (Scale croaker)

== Characteristics ==
Nibea croakers have the first pair of pores on the chin set closely together, immediately to the rear of the symphysis of the lower jaw, and connected by a crescent-shaped groove. The teeth in the lower jaw are not uniform in size. The swim bladder has a shape like a carrot and has branched appendages along the whole of both its sides and the most forward of these goes through the transverse septum. The type species is the largest member of the genus, with a maximum published standard length of 75 cm (30 in) while the smallscale croaker (N. leptolepis) with a maximum published standard length of 22 cm (8.7 in) is the smallest member.

== Distribution ==
Nibea croakers are found in the Indo-Pacific region from Pakistan east to New Guinea, south to Australia and north to Japan.
