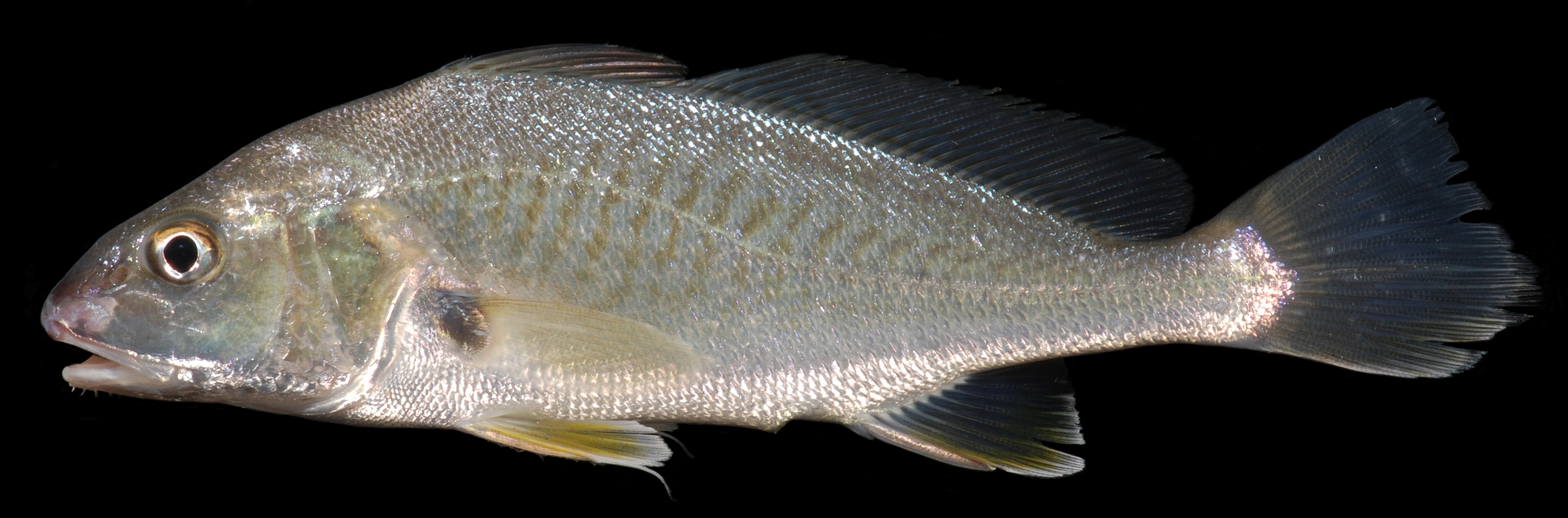
- Atlantic croaker, Micropogonias undulatus

Scientific classification
- Kingdom: Animalia
- Phylum: Chordata
- Class: Actinopterygii
- Division: Teleostei
- Order: Acanthuriformes
- Suborder: Sciaenoidei
- Family: Sciaenidae; Cuvier, 1829

Genera
- About 66–70, see text

= Sciaenidae =

Sciaenidae Temporal range: Late Paleocene to present

Family of fishes

Sciaenidae is a family of ray-finned fishes belonging to the order Acanthuriformes. They are commonly called drums or croakers in reference to the repetitive throbbing or drumming sounds they make. The family consists of about 293 to 298 species in about 66 or 67 genera.

== Taxonomy ==
Sciaenidae was first proposed as a family in 1829 by the French zoologist Georges Cuvier. The 5th edition of Fishes of the World classifies the family in the suborder Sciaenoidei, alongside the rover family Emmelichthyidae, in the order Acanthuriformes. Other authorities classify the Sciaenidae and the Emmelichthyidae as incertae sedis within the series Eupercaria. The Catalog of Fishes retains this family within the Acanthuriformes but does not recognise the suborder Sciaenoidei.

The 5th edition of Fishes of the World, Fishbase and Catalog of Fishes do not recognise subfamilies within the Sciaenidae but many workers on these fishes do recognise subfamilies and tribes within the family. For example, in 1989 Kunio Sasaki erected a number of subfamilies and tribes.

== Genera ==
The following genera are classified within the family Sciaenidae:

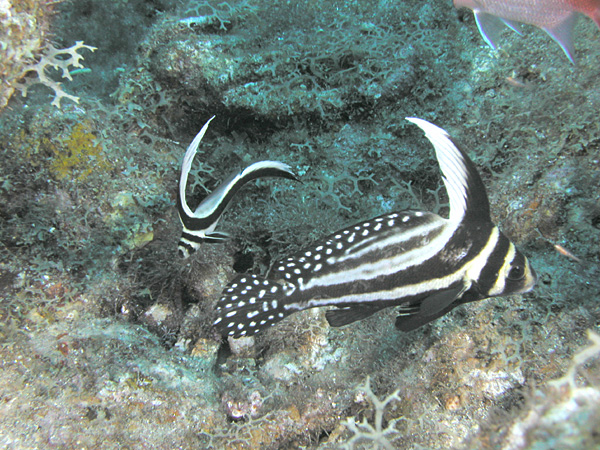
Adult and juvenile spotted drum, St. Kitts

- Aplodinotus Rafinesque, 1819
- Argyrosomus De la Pylaie, 1835
- Aspericorvina Fowler, 1834
- Atractoscion Gill, 1862
- Atrobucca Chu, Lo & Wu, 1963
- Austronibea Trewavas, 1977
- Bahaba Herre, 1935
- Bairdiella Gill, 1861
- Boesemania Trewavas, 1977
- Cheilotrema Tschudi, 1846
- Chrysochir Trevawas & Yazdani, 1966
- Cilus Delfin, 1900
- Collichthys Günther, 1860
- Corvula Jordan & C. H. Eigenmann, 1889
- Ctenosciaena Fowler & B. A. Bean, 1923
- Cynoscion Gill, 1861
- Daysciaena Talwar, 1971
- Dendrophysa Trewavas, 1964
- Elattarchus Jordan & Evermann, 1896
- Eques Bloch 1793
- Genyonemus Gill, 1861
- Isopisthus Gill, 1862
- Johnius Bloch, 1793
- Kathala Lal Mohan 1969
- Larimichthys Jordan & Starks, 1905
- Larimus Cuvier, 1830
- Leiostomus Lacépède, 1802
- Lonchurus Bloch, 1793
- Macrodon Schinz, 1822
- Macrospinosa Lal Mohan, 1969
- Megalonibea Chu, Lo & Wu, 1963
- Menticirrhus Gill, 1861
- Micropogonias Bonaparte, 1831
- Miichthys Lin, 1938
- Miracorvina Trewavas, 1962
- Nebris Cuvier, 1830
- Nibea Jordan & W. F. Thompson, 1911
- Odontoscion Gill, 1862
- Ophioscion Gill, 1863
- Otolithes Oken, 1817
- Otolithoides Fowler, 1933
- Pachypops Gill, 1861
- Pachyurus Agassiz, 1831
- Panna Lal Mohan, 1969
- Paralonchurus Bocourt, 1869
- Paranebris Chao, Béarez and Robertson, 2001
- Paranibea Trewavas, 1977
- Pareques Gill in Goode, 1876
- Pennahia Fowler, 1926
- Pentheroscion Trewavas, 1962
- Petilipinnis Casatti, 2002
- Plagioscion Gill, 1861
- Pogonias Lacépède, 1801
- Protonibea Trewavas, 1971
- Protosciaena Sasaki, 1989
- Pseudolarimichthys Lo, Liu, Mohd Nor & Chen, 2017
- Pseudotolithus Bleeker, 1863
- Pteroscion Fowler, 1925
- Pterotolithus Fowler 1933
- Robaloscion Béarez & Schwarzhans 2014
- Roncador Jordan & Gilbert, 1880
- Sciaena Linnaeus, 1758
- Sciaenops Gill, 1863
- Seriphus Ayres, 1860
- Sonorolux Trewavas, 1977
- Stellifer Oken, 1817
- Totoaba Villamar, 1980
- Umbrina Cuvier, 1816

=== Fossil genera ===
The following fossil genera are known:

- †Advenasciaena Kocsis, Lin, Bernard & Johari, 2024 [otolith]
- †Bruneisciaena Kocsis, Lin, Bernard & Johari, 2024 [otolith]
- †Carnevalella Bannikov, 2013 (only member of subfamily Carnevalellinae)
- †Caucasisciaena Bannikov, Carnevale & Landini, 2009
- †Chaoia Bannikov, Schwarzhans & Carnevale, 2018 [otolith]
- †Croatosciaena Bannikov, Schwarzhans & Carnevale, 2018
- †Diaphyodus von Schafhäutl, 1863
- †Equetulus Aguilera & Schwarzhans, 2014 [otolith]
- ?†Fisherichthys Weems, 1999
- †Jefitchia Frizzell & Dante, 1965
- †Landinisciaena Bannikov, Schwarzhans & Carnevale, 2018
- †Leptosciaena Bannikov, Schwarzhans & Carnevale, 2018 [otolith]
- †Lompoquia Jordan & Gilbert, 1919
- †Pebasciaena Schwarzhans, Aguilera, Scheyer & Carrillo-Briceño, 2022 [otolith]
- †Pontosciaena Bannikov, Schwarzhans & Carnevale, 2018 [otolith]
- †Protolarimus Aguilera & Schwarzhans, 2014 [otolith]
- ?†Pseudoumbrina Menner, 1948
- †Taosciaena Lin & Chien, 2022 [otolith]
- †Trewasciaena Schwarzhans, 1993

The fossil genus Ioscion may be either a drumfish or belong to its own family more closely related to carangids.

The former Paratethys Sea appears to have been a hotspot of endemism for many of these extinct sciaenid taxa, as many articulated remains and otoliths are known from this region.

== Etymology ==
Sciaenidae takes its name from its type genus Sciaena which is derived from the Greek skiaina, which was used to refer to marine perch-like fishes.

== Characteristics ==
A sciaenid has a long dorsal fin reaching nearly to the tail, and a notch between the rays and spines of the dorsal, although the two parts are actually separate. Drums are somberly coloured, usually in shades of brown, with a lateral line on each side that extends to the tip of the caudal fin. The anal fin usually has two spines, while the dorsal fins are deeply notched or separate. Most species have a rounded or pointed caudal fin. The mouth is set low and is usually inferior. Their croaking mechanism involves the beating of abdominal muscles against the swim bladder.

Sciaenids are found worldwide, in both fresh and salt water, and are typically benthic carnivores, feeding on invertebrates and smaller fish. They are small to medium-sized, bottom-dwelling fishes living primarily in estuaries, bays, and muddy river banks. Most of these fish types avoid clear waters, such as coral reefs and oceanic islands, with a few notable exceptions (e.g. reef croaker, high-hat, and spotted drum). They live in warm-temperate and tropical waters and are best represented in major rivers in Southeast Asia, northeast South America, the Gulf of Mexico, and the Gulf of California.

In the United States most fishers consider freshwater drum to be rough fish not suitable for eating, similar to carp, gar, and buffalo fish, although there are a number of people that enjoy fishing for these species and eating them, despite their limitations.

== Fisheries ==
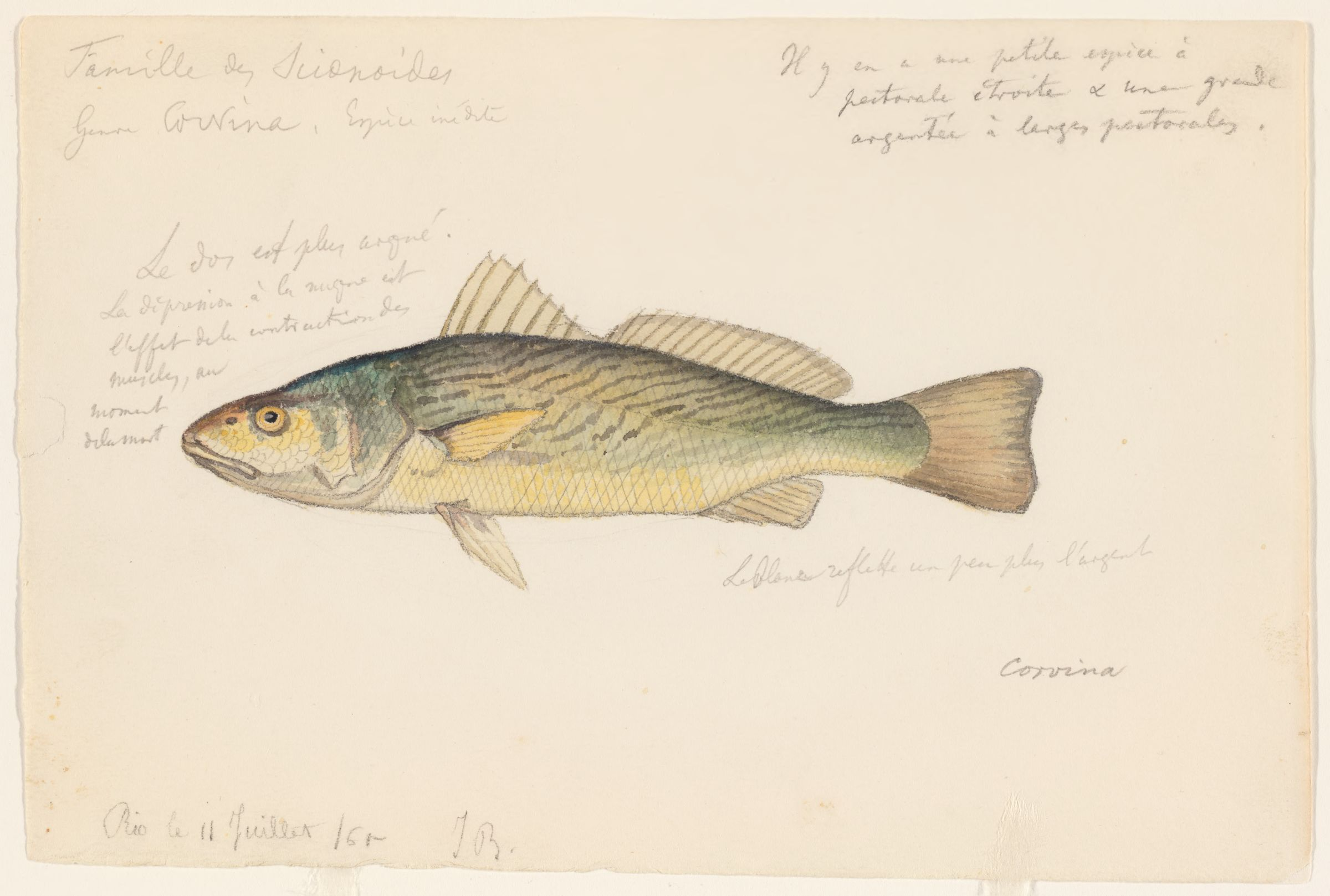
An 1865 watercolor painting of Brazilian croaker by Jacques Burkhardt.

They are excellent food and sport fish, and are commonly caught by surf and pier fishers. Some are important commercial fishery species, notably small yellow croaker with reported landings of 218,000–407,000 tonnes in 2000–2009; according to FAO fishery statistics, it was the 25th most important fishery species worldwide. However, a large proportion of the catch is not reported at species level; in the FAO fishery statistics, the category "Croakers, drums, not elsewhere included", is the largest one within sciaenids, with annual landings of 431,000–780,000 tonnes in 2000–2009, most of which were reported from the western Indian Ocean (FAO fishing area 51) and northwest Pacific (FAO fishing area 61). The future of croakers, like many other fish species in the United States and around the world is uncertain because overfishing continues to be a major threat. The population has decreased significantly which will affect their ability reproduce. In United States Croakers are managed by the federal and state governments to ensure that they're harvested sustainably.

== Croaking mechanism ==
A notable trait of sciaenids is the ability to produce a "croaking" sound. However, the pitch and use of croaking varies from species to species. The croaking ability is a distinguishing characteristic of sciaenids. The croaking mechanism is used by males as a mating call in some species.

To produce the croaking sound, special muscles vibrate against the swim bladder. These muscles are called sonic muscle fibres, and run horizontally along the fish's body on both sides around the swim bladder, connected to a central tendon that surrounds the swim bladder ventrally. These sonic muscle fibres are repeatedly contracted against the swim bladder to produce the croaking sound that gives drum and croaker their common name, effectively using the swim bladder as a resonating chamber. The sciaenids' large swim bladder is more expansive and branched than other species, which aids in the croaking. In some species the sonic muscle fibres are only present in males. These muscles strengthen during the mating season and are allowed to atrophy the rest of the time, deactivating the croaking mechanism. In other species, most notably the Atlantic croaker, the croaking mechanism is present in both sexes and remains active year-round. These species are thought to use croaking for communication, such as announcing hazards and location when in turbid water.

=== Croaking in communication ===
In some species, croaking is used for communication aside from attracting mates. For those species that have year-round croaking ability, the croaks may serve as a low-aggression warning during group feeding, as well as to communicate location in cloudy water. In those species that lack the ability to croak year-round, croaking is usually restricted to males for attracting mates. A disadvantage to the croaking ability is that it allows bottlenose dolphin to easily locate large groups of croaker and drum as they broadcast their position, indicating large amounts of food for the dolphins.
