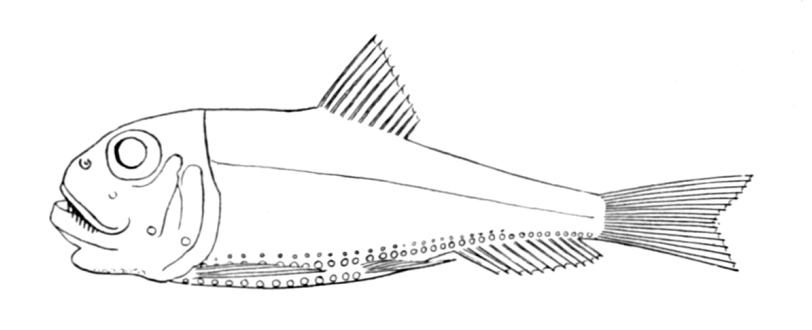
- Ichthyococcus ovatus

Scientific classification
- Kingdom: Animalia
- Phylum: Chordata
- Class: Actinopterygii
- Order: Stomiiformes
- Family: Ichthyococcidae; Chang et al., 2025
- Genus: Ichthyococcus; Bonaparte, 1840

Genera
- See text

= Ichthyococcus =

Genus of fishes

Ichthyococcus, the fireflyfishes, is a genus of deep-sea stomiiform fish. It is the only member of the family Ichthyococcidae.

== Included species ==
There are currently seven recognized species in this genus:

- Ichthyococcus australis Mukhacheva, 1980 (Southern lightfish)
- Ichthyococcus elongatus S. Imai, 1941 (Slim lightfish)
- Ichthyococcus intermedius Mukhacheva, 1980 (Intermediate lightfish)
- Ichthyococcus irregularis Rechnitzer & J. E. Böhlke, 1958 (Bulldog lightfish)
- Ichthyococcus ovatus (Cocco, 1838) (Lightfish)
- Ichthyococcus parini Mukhacheva, 1980
- Ichthyococcus polli Blache, 1963

Members of this family were formerly placed in the family Phosichthyidae, but a 2025 phylogenetic study found the latter family to be paraphyletic as previously described. Ichthyococcus was found to belong to a distinct lineage sister to the clade containing the Phosichthyidae and Stomiidae, and was thus described as its own family, the Ichthyococcidae.
