= Diplophos pacificus =

Scientific classification
- Kingdom: Animalia
- Phylum: Chordata
- Class: Actinopterygii
- Division: Teleostei
- Order: Stomiiformes
- Family: Diplophidae
- Genus: Diplophos
- Species: D. pacificus

Binomial name
- Diplophos pacificus Günther, 1889

Species of Actinopterygii

Diplophos pacificus is a species of fish in the family Gonostomatidae.
