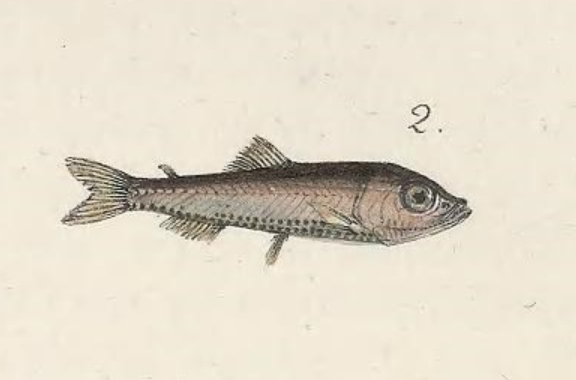

Scientific classification
- Kingdom: Animalia
- Phylum: Chordata
- Class: Actinopterygii
- Order: Stomiiformes
- Family: Vinciguerriidae
- Genus: Vinciguerria
- Species: V. poweriae

Binomial name
- Vinciguerria poweriae (Cocco, 1838)

Synonyms
- Gonostomus poweriae Cocco, 1838; Ichthyococcus poweriae (Cocco, 1838); Maurolicus poweriae (Cocco, 1838); Scopelus poweriae (Cocco, 1838)

= Vinciguerria poweriae =

Species of fish

Vinciguerria poweriae (also known as Power's deep-water bristle-mouth fish) is a species of lightfish belonging to the genus Vinciguerria. They are mostly found in seawater 300–600 metres (1,000–2,000 ft) deep during the day and 50–350 metres (160–1,150 ft) deep at night. They feed on small crustaceans.

== Etymology ==
The fish is named in honor of Cocco's friend and colleague Jeanne Villepreux-Power (1794–1871), also known as Jeanette Power, a marine biologist who was famous for her work on the octopus Argonauta argo. She was able to demonstrate that the octopus produced its own shell, rather than as was thought, acquiring it from a different organism similar to the way a hermit crab does. She also was the first person to create an aquaria for the experimentation of aquatic organisms.

== Description ==
Vinciguerria poweriae is a moderately slender and elongate fish growing to a length of about 43 mm (1.7 in). The eyes are widely spaced and are not tubular, and the mouth is large, with a single row of teeth of varying length. The dorsal fin has 13 to 15 soft rays and is set in front of a small adipose fin (a small fleshy fin without supporting rays). The pectoral fins have 9 to 11 soft rays, the pelvic fins 7 and the anal fin 12 to 14. There are photophores (light-producing organs) on the lower half of the head and in two rows on the underside of the fish. The dorsal surface of the body is dark, the flanks are silvery and the fins are colourless. There is a dark streak at the angle of the jaw and another above the premaxilla.

== Distribution ==
Vinciguerria poweriae has a global distribution in tropical and subtropical waters. They make a diel vertical migration, being 300–600 metres (1,000–2,000 ft) deep during the day and rising to 50–350 metres (160–1,150 ft) at night. They feed mostly on copepods and spawning occurs mostly in spring and summer.
