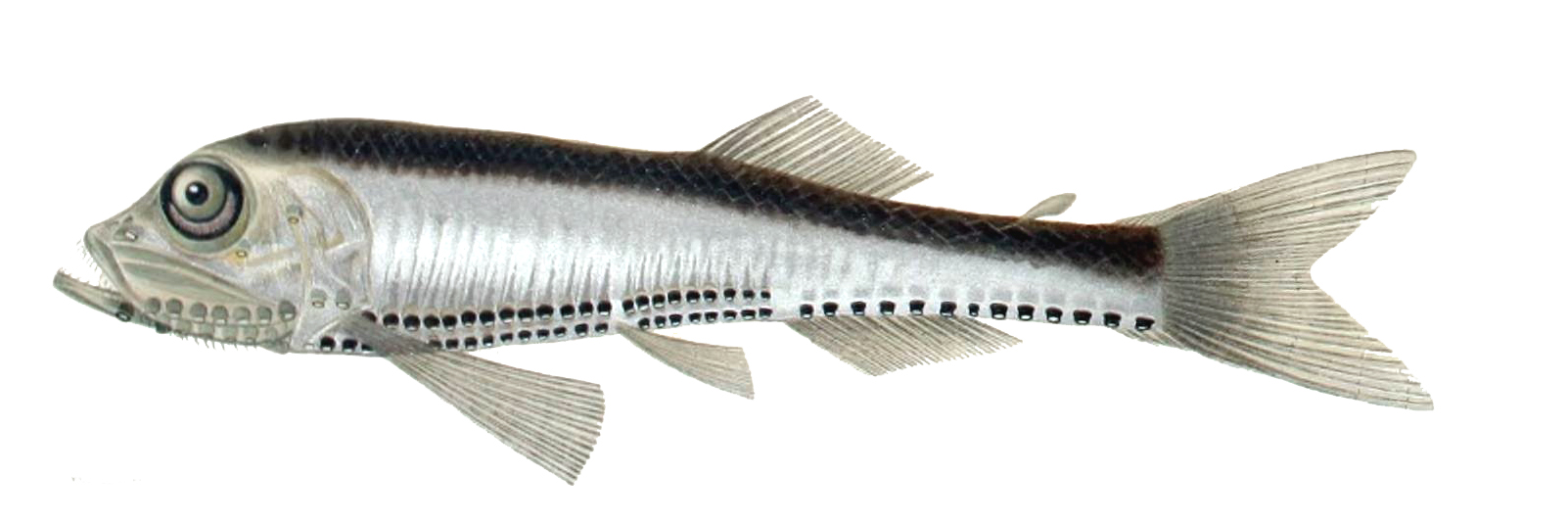
- Vinciguerria attenuata

Scientific classification
- Kingdom: Animalia
- Phylum: Chordata
- Class: Actinopterygii
- Order: Stomiiformes
- Family: Vinciguerriidae; Chang et al., 2025

Type genus
- Vinciguerria Jordan & Evermann, 1896

Genera
- Pollichthys Grey, 1959; Vinciguerria Jordan & Evermann, 1896

= Vinciguerriidae =

Vinciguerriidae Temporal range: Middle Eocene–present

The Vinciguerriidae, also known as lighthousefishes and stareyes, are a family of mesopelagic marine fish found in deep waters worldwide.

Members of this family were formerly placed in the family Phosichthyidae, but a 2025 phylogenetic study found the latter family to be paraphyletic as previously described. One clade comprising two genera was found to be the most basal stomiiform lineage, and was thus described as its own family, the Vinciguerriidae.

The following two genera are placed in this family:

- Pollichthys Grey, 1959
- Vinciguerria Jordan & Evermann, 1896

Many species are extremely small; many in the genus Vinciguerria only reach 4 cm in length. They make up for their small size with abundant numbers: Vinciguerria is thought — with the possible exception of Cyclothone — to be the most abundant genus of vertebrates. Deep-sea trawls of the Humboldt Current in the southeast Pacific have found that lightfishes make up 85% by mass of mesopelagic fishes, with Vinciguerria lucetia by far the most numerous species.
