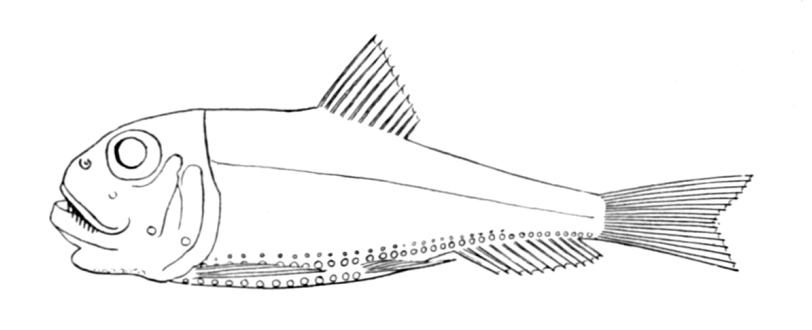

Scientific classification
- Kingdom: Animalia
- Phylum: Chordata
- Class: Actinopterygii
- Order: Stomiiformes
- Family: Phosichthyidae
- Genus: Ichthyococcus
- Species: I. ovatus

Binomial name
- Ichthyococcus ovatus (Cocco, 1838)

= Ichthyococcus ovatus =

Species of fish

Ichthyococcus ovatus is a lightfish of the genus Ichthyococcus.
