= Diplophos orientalis =

Scientific classification
- Kingdom: Animalia
- Phylum: Chordata
- Class: Actinopterygii
- Order: Stomiiformes
- Family: Diplophidae
- Genus: Diplophos
- Species: D. orientalis

Binomial name
- Diplophos orientalis Matsubara, 1940

Species of Actinopterygii

Diplophos orientalis (originally derived from Greek word diploos meaning double and phos meaning light) is a species of fish in the family Gonostomatidae.
