= Vinciguerria mabahiss =

Conservation status
- Least Concern (IUCN 3.1)

Scientific classification
- Kingdom: Animalia
- Phylum: Chordata
- Class: Actinopterygii
- Order: Stomiiformes
- Family: Phosichthyidae
- Genus: Vinciguerria
- Species: V. mabahiss

Binomial name
- Vinciguerria mabahiss R. K. Johnson & Feltes, 1984

Species of fish

Vinciguerria mabahiss is a species of fish in the family Phosichthyidae. It is endemic to the Red Sea.
