= Ichthyococcus intermedius =

Scientific classification
- Domain: Eukaryota
- Kingdom: Animalia
- Phylum: Chordata
- Class: Actinopterygii
- Order: Stomiiformes
- Family: Phosichthyidae
- Genus: Ichthyococcus
- Species: I. intermedius

Binomial name
- Ichthyococcus intermedius Mukhacheva, 1980

Species of fish

Ichthyococcus intermedius, also known as Intermediate lightfish, is a species of the genus Ichthyococcus.
