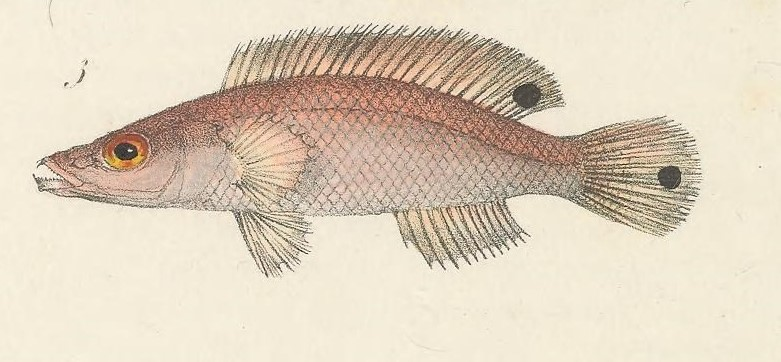

Scientific classification
- Domain: Eukaryota
- Kingdom: Animalia
- Phylum: Chordata
- Class: Actinopterygii
- Order: Labriformes
- Family: Labridae
- Genus: Lappanella; D. S. Jordan, 1890

Type species
- Ctenolabrus iris Valenciennes, 1839

Synonyms
- Marzapanus Facciolà, 1916

= Lappanella =

Genus of fishes

Lappanella is a genus of wrasses native to the eastern Atlantic Ocean and the Mediterranean Sea.

== Species ==
The currently recognized species in this genus are:

- Lappanella fasciata (Cocco, 1833)
- Lappanella guineensis Bauchot, 1969
