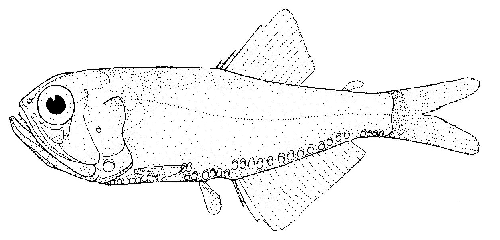
- Drawing by Dr Tony Ayling

Scientific classification
- Kingdom: Animalia
- Phylum: Arthropoda
- Clade: Pancrustacea
- Class: Insecta
- Order: Hymenoptera
- Family: Formicidae
- Subfamily: Formicinae
- Genus: Margrethia
- Species: M. obtusirostra

Binomial name
- Margrethia obtusirostra Jespersen & Tåning, 1919

= Margrethia obtusirostra =

Species of fish

Margrethia obtusirostra, the Bighead portholefish, is a bristlemouth of the family Gonostomatidae, found in the tropical and subtropical Indo-Pacific and Atlantic oceans, at depths of between 100 and 600 m. Its length is between 5 and 8 cm.
