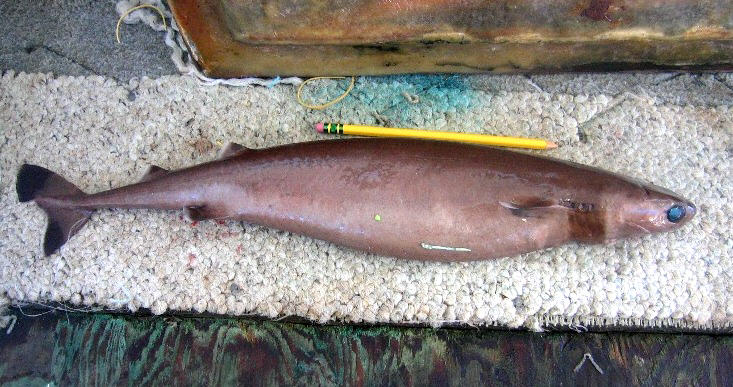

Conservation status
- Least Concern (IUCN 3.1)

Scientific classification
- Kingdom: Animalia
- Phylum: Chordata
- Class: Chondrichthyes
- Subclass: Elasmobranchii
- Division: Selachii
- Order: Squaliformes
- Family: Dalatiidae
- Genus: Isistius
- Species: I. brasiliensis

Binomial name
- Isistius brasiliensis (Quoy & Gaimard, 1824)
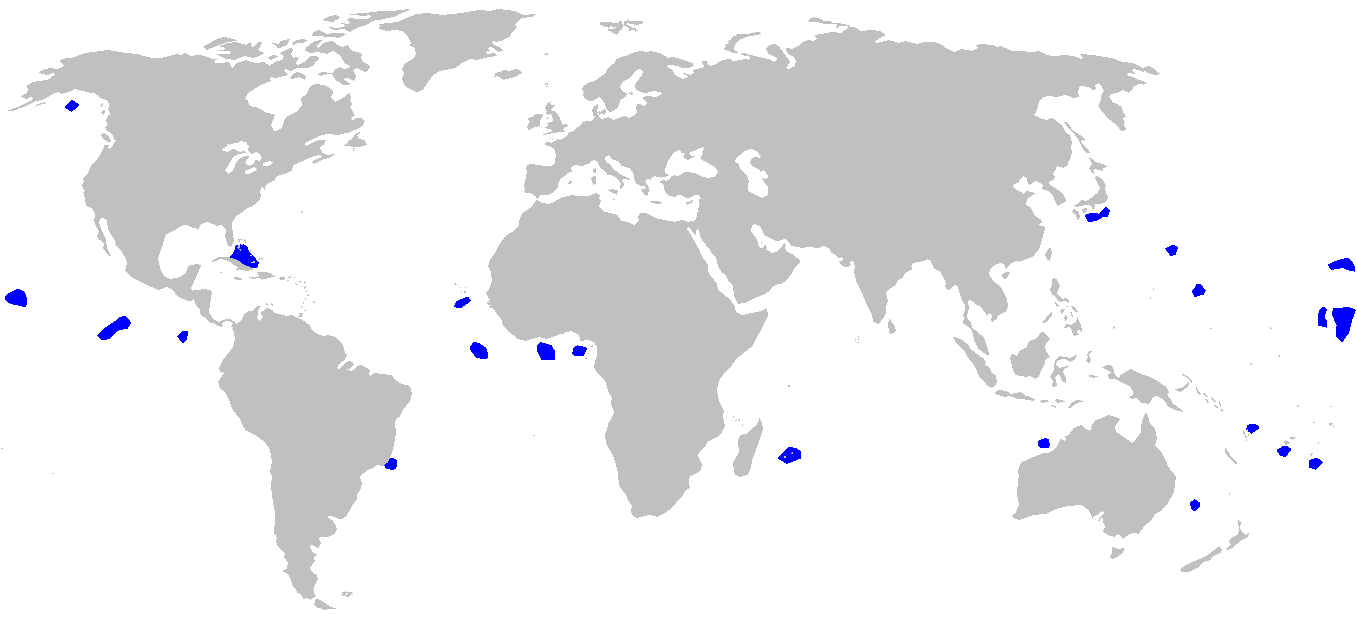
- Range of the cookiecutter shark

Synonyms
- Isistius labialis Meng, Chu & Li, 1985; Leius ferox Kner, 1864; Scymnus brasiliensis Quoy & Gaimard, 1824; Scymnus torquatus Müller & Henle, 1839; Scymnus unicolor Müller & Henle, 1839; Squalus fulgens Bennett, 1840

= Cookiecutter shark =

Species of shark

The cookiecutter shark (Isistius brasiliensis), also called the cigar shark, is a species of small squaliform shark in the family Dalatiidae. This shark lives in warm, oceanic waters worldwide, particularly near islands, and has been recorded as deep as 3.7 km (2.3 mi). It migrates vertically up to 3 km (1.9 mi) every day, approaching the surface at dusk and descending with the dawn. Reaching only 42–56 cm (16.5–22 in) in length, the cookiecutter shark has a long, cylindrical body with a short, blunt snout, large eyes, two tiny spineless dorsal fins, and a large caudal fin. It is dark brown, with light-emitting photophores covering its underside except for a dark "collar" around its throat and gill slits.

The name "cookiecutter shark" refers to its feeding method of gouging round plugs, as if cut out with a cookie cutter, out of larger animals. Marks made by cookiecutter sharks have been found on a wide variety of marine mammals and fishes, and on submarines, undersea cables, and human bodies. It also consumes whole smaller prey, such as squid. Cookiecutter sharks have adaptations for hovering in the water column, and likely rely on stealth and subterfuge to capture more active prey. Its dark collar seems to mimic the silhouette of a small fish, while the rest of its body blends into the downwelling light via its ventral photophores. When a would-be predator approaches the lure, the shark attaches itself using its suctorial lips and specialized pharynx and neatly excises a chunk of the flesh using its bandsaw-like set of lower teeth. The cookiecutter shark preys on various animals including animals that are larger than the shark itself, such as tuna, swordfish, squid, shellfish, whales, dolphins, orcas and larger sharks such as the great white shark. This species has been known to travel in schools.

Though rarely encountered because of its oceanic habitat, a handful of documented attacks on humans were apparently caused by cookiecutter sharks. Nevertheless, this diminutive shark is not regarded as dangerous to humans. The International Union for Conservation of Nature has listed the cookiecutter shark under least concern, as it is widely distributed, has no commercial value, and is not particularly susceptible to fisheries.

== Taxonomy ==
French naturalists Jean René Constant Quoy and Joseph Paul Gaimard originally described the cookiecutter shark during the 1817–1820 exploratory voyage of the corvette Uranie under Louis de Freycinet, giving it the name Scymnus brasiliensis because the type specimen was caught off Brazil. In 1824, their account was published as part of Voyage autour du monde...sur les corvettes de S.M. l'Uranie et la Physicienne, Louis de Freycinet's 13 volume report on the voyage. In 1865, American ichthyologist Theodore Nicholas Gill coined the new genus Isistius for this species, after Isis, the Egyptian goddess of light.

One of the earliest accounts of the wounds left by the cookiecutter shark on various animals is in ancient Samoan legend, which held that atu (skipjack tuna) entering Palauli Bay would leave behind pieces of their flesh as a sacrifice to Tautunu, the community chief. In later centuries, various other explanations for the wounds were advanced, including lampreys, bacteria, and invertebrate parasites. In 1971, Everet Jones of the U.S. Bureau of Commercial Fisheries (a predecessor of the National Marine Fisheries Service) discovered the cigar shark, as the cookiecutter shark was then generally known, was responsible. Shark expert Stewart Springer thus popularized the name "cookiecutter shark" for this species (though he originally called them "demon whale-biters"). Other common names used for this shark include luminous shark, smalltooth cookiecutter shark, and smooth cookiecutter shark.

== Description ==
The cookiecutter shark has an elongated, cigar-shaped body with a short, bulbously rounded snout. The nostrils have a very short flap of skin in front. The large, oval, green eyes are placed forward on the head, though not so that binocular vision is extensive. Behind the eyes are large spiracles, positioned on the upper surface of the head.

The mouth is short, forming a nearly transverse line, and is surrounded by enlarged, fleshy, suctorial lips. The upper jaw has 30–37 teeth, and the lower jaw has 25–31, increasing with body size. The upper and lower teeth are extremely different; the upper teeth are small, narrow, and upright, tapering to a single, smooth-edged cusp. The lower teeth are also smooth-edged, but much larger, broader, and knife-like, with their bases interlocking to form a single saw-like cutting edge. The five pairs of gill slits are small.

The pectoral fins are short and roughly trapezoidal in shape. Two spineless dorsal fins are placed far back on the body, the first originating just ahead of the pelvic fins and the second located just behind. The second dorsal fin is slightly larger than the first, and the pelvic fins are larger than either. The anal fin is absent. The caudal fin is broad, with the lower lobe almost as large as the upper, which has a prominent ventral notch. The dermal denticles are squarish and flattened, with a slight central concavity and raised corners. The cookiecutter shark is chocolate brown in color, becoming subtly lighter below, and a dark "collar" wraps around the gill region.

The fins have translucent margins, except for the caudal fin, which has a darker margin. Complex, light-producing organs called photophores densely cover the entire underside, except for the collar, and produce a vivid green glow. The maximum recorded length for this species is 42 cm (17 in) for males and 56 cm (22 in) for females.

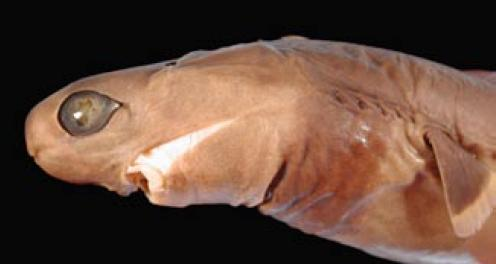
The cookiecutter shark has a short, rounded head with large, anteriorly placed eyes and a transverse mouth.

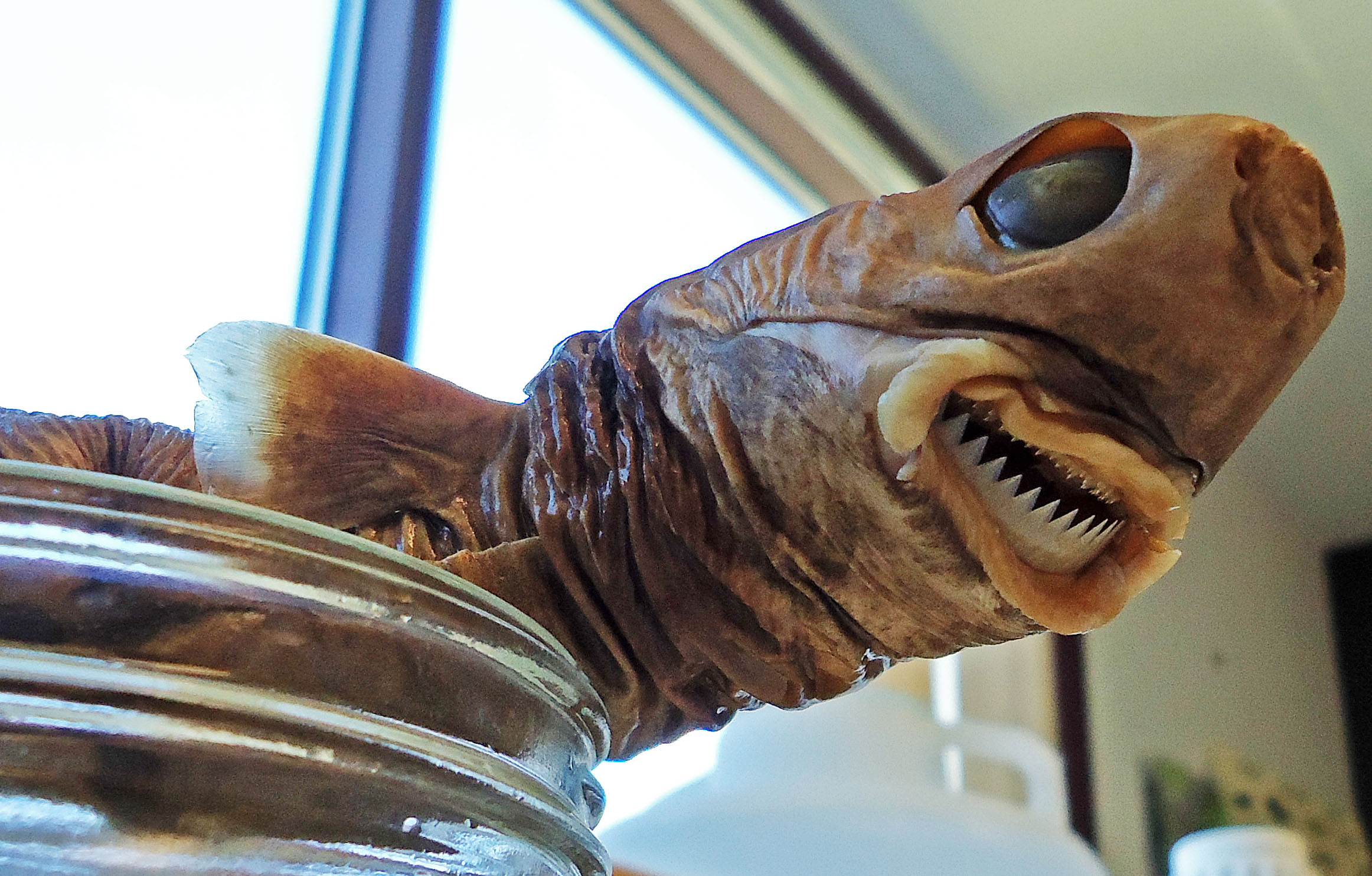
Head

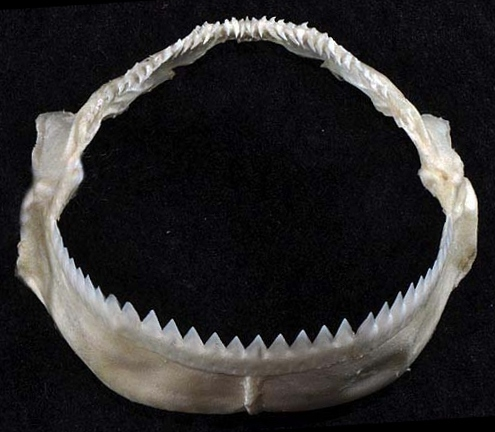
Jaws

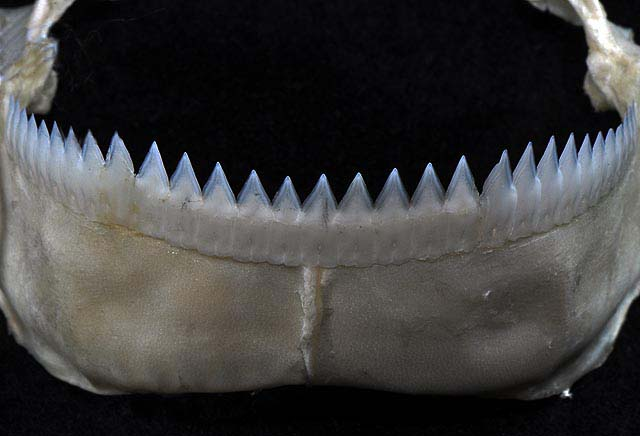
Lower teeth

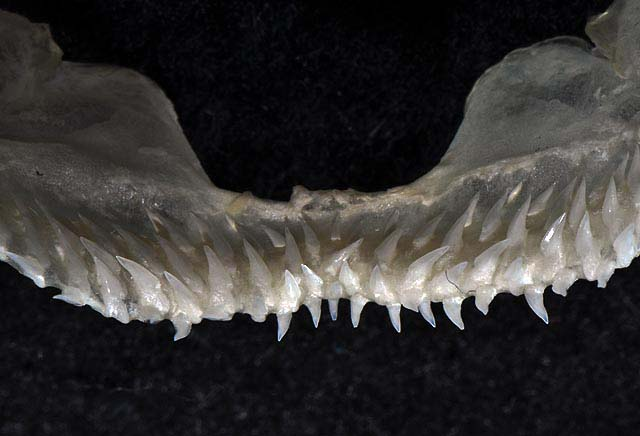
Upper teeth

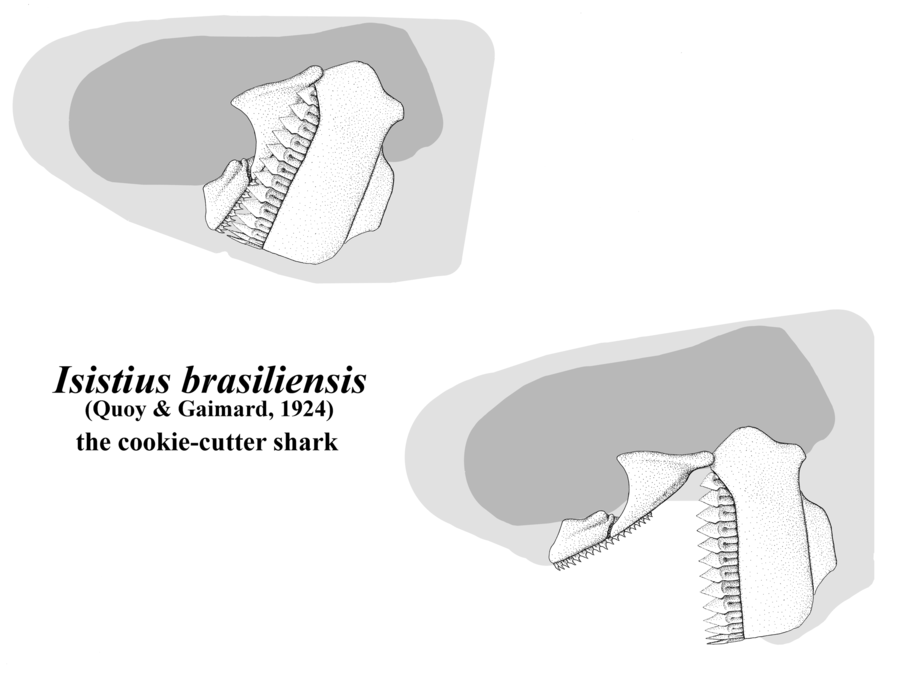
Jaw diagram

== Distribution and habitat ==
Inhabiting all of the world's major tropical and warm-temperate oceanic basins, the cookiecutter shark is most common between the latitudes of 20°N and 20°S, where the surface water temperature is 18–26 °C (64–79 °F). In the Atlantic, it has been reported off the Bahamas and southern Brazil in the west, Cape Verde, Guinea to Sierra Leone, southern Angola, and South Africa in the east, and Ascension Island in the south. In the Indo-Pacific region, it has been caught from Mauritius to New Guinea, Australia, and New Zealand, including Tasmania and Lord Howe Island, as well as off Japan. In the central and eastern Pacific, it occurs from Fiji north to the Hawaiian Islands, and east to the Galápagos, Easter, and Guadalupe Islands. Fresh wounds observed on marine mammals suggest this shark may range as far as California in warm years.

Based on catch records, the cookiecutter shark appears to conduct a diel vertical migration up to 3 km (1.9 mi) each way. It spends the day at a depth of 1–3.7 km (0.62–2.30 mi), and at night it rises into the upper water column, usually remaining below 85 m (279 ft), but on rare occasions venturing to the surface. This species may be more tolerant of low dissolved oxygen levels than sharks in the related genera Euprotomicrus and Squaliolus. It is frequently found near islands, perhaps for reproductive purposes or because they hold congregations of large prey animals. In the northeastern Atlantic, most adults are found between 11°N and 16°N, with the smallest and largest individuals being found in lower and higher latitudes, respectively. There is no evidence of sex segregation.

== Biology and ecology ==
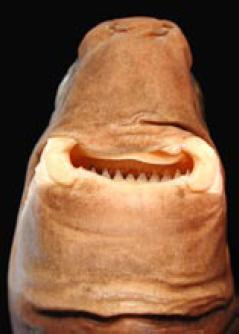
The suctorial lips and large lower teeth of the cookiecutter sharks are adaptations for its parasitic lifestyle.

Best known for biting neat round chunks of tissue from marine mammals and large fish, the cookiecutter shark is considered a facultative ectoparasite, as it also wholly ingests smaller prey. It has a wide gape and a very strong bite, by virtue of heavily calcified cranial and labial cartilages. With small fins and weak muscles, this ambush predator spends much of its time hovering in the water column. Its liver, which can comprise some 35% of its weight, is rich in low-density lipids, which enables it to maintain neutral buoyancy. This species has higher skeletal density than Euprotomicrus or Squaliolus, and its body cavity and liver are proportionately much larger, with much higher oil content. Its large caudal fin allows it to make a quick burst of speed to catch larger, faster prey that come in range.

The cookiecutter shark regularly replaces its teeth like other sharks, but sheds its lower teeth in entire rows rather than one at a time. A cookiecutter shark has been calculated to have shed 15 sets of lower teeth, totaling 435–465 teeth, from when it was 14 cm (5.5 in) long to when it reached 50 cm (20 in), a significant investment of resources. The shark swallows its old sets of teeth, enabling it to recycle the calcium content.

Unlike other sharks, the retina of the cookiecutter shark has ganglion cells concentrated in a concentric area rather than in a horizontal streak across the visual field; this may help to focus on prey in front of the shark.

This shark has been known to travel in schools, which may increase the effectiveness of its lure (see below), and discourage attacks by much larger predators.

=== Bioluminescence ===
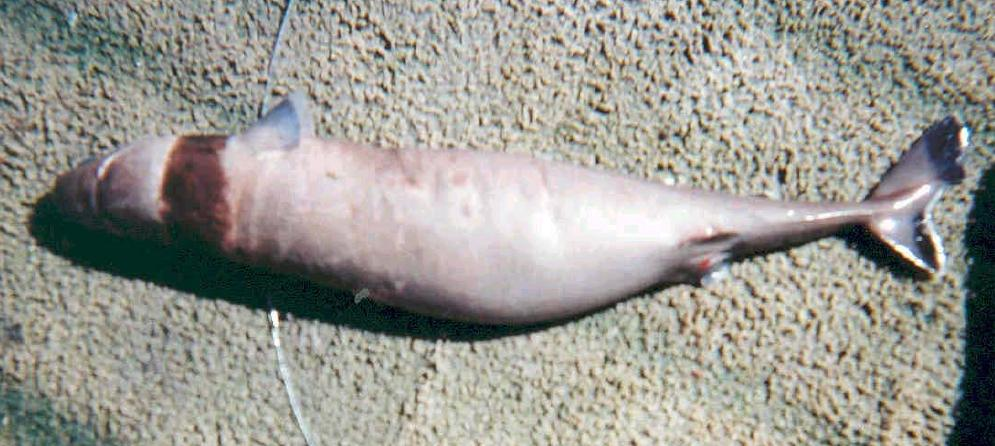
The dark collar of the cookiecutter shark is believed to act as a lure.

The intrinsic green luminescence of the cookiecutter shark is the strongest known of any shark, and has been reported to persist for three hours after it has been taken out of water. The ventrally positioned photophores serve to disrupt its silhouette from below by matching the downwelling light, a strategy known as counter-illumination, that is common among bioluminescent organisms of the mesopelagic zone. The individual photophores are set around the denticles and are small enough that they cannot be discerned by the naked eye, suggesting they have evolved to fool animals with high visual acuity and/or at close distances.

Set apart from the glowing underside, the darker, nonluminescent collar tapers at both sides of the throat, and has been hypothesized to serve as a lure by mimicking the silhouette of a small fish from below. The appeal of the lure would be multiplied in a school of sharks. If the collar does function in this way, the cookiecutter shark would be the only known case of bioluminescence in which the absence of light attracts prey, while its photophores serve to inhibit detection by predators. As the shark can only match a limited range of light intensities, it has been suggested that its vertical movements might serve to preserve the effectiveness of its disguise across various times of day and weather conditions.

=== Feeding ===
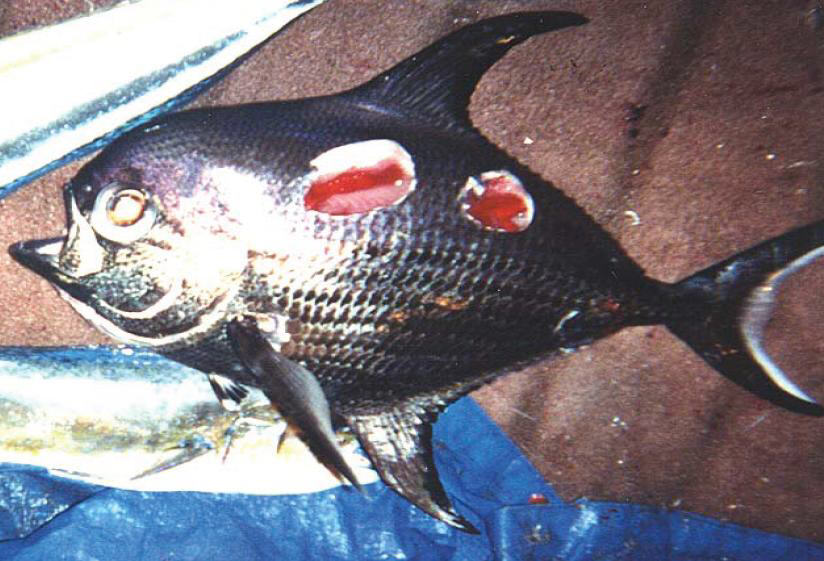
Pomfrets are one of the many species parasitized by the cookiecutter shark.

Virtually every type of medium- to large-sized oceanic animal sharing the habitat of the cookiecutter shark is open to attack; bite scars have been found on cetaceans (including porpoises, orcas, dolphins, beaked whales, sperm whales and baleen whales), pinnipeds (including fur seals, leopard seals and elephant seals), dugongs, larger sharks (including blue sharks, goblin sharks, basking sharks, great white sharks, megamouth sharks and smalltooth sand tiger sharks), stingrays (including deepwater stingrays, pelagic stingrays and sixgill stingrays), and bony fishes (including billfishes, tunas, dolphinfishes, jacks, escolars, opahs, and pomfrets). The cookiecutter shark also regularly hunts and eats entire squid with a mantle length of 15–30 cm (5.9–11.8 in), comparable in size to the shark itself, as well as bristlemouths, copepods, and other smaller prey.

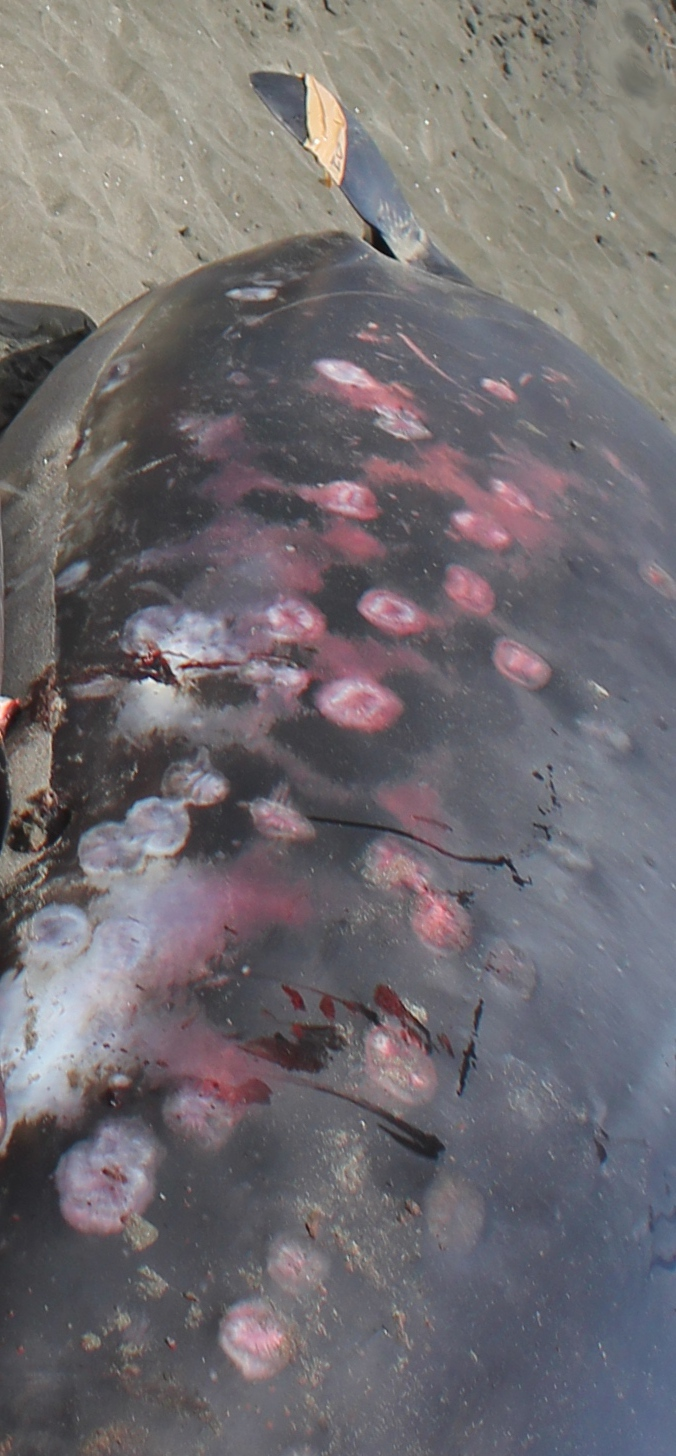
Round scars from cookiecutter shark bites are found on many cetaceans, such as this beached Gray's beaked whale.

Parasitic attacks by the cookiecutter shark leave a round "crater wound", averaging 5 cm (2.0 in) across and 7 cm (2.8 in) deep. The prevalence of these attacks can be high: off Hawaii, nearly every adult spinner dolphin bears scars from this species. Diseased or otherwise weakened animals appear to be more susceptible, and in the western Atlantic observations have been made of emaciated beached melon-headed whales with dozens to hundreds of recent and healing cookiecutter shark wounds, while such wounds are rare on non-emaciated beached whales. The impact of parasitism on prey species, in terms of resources diverted from growth or reproduction, is uncertain.

The cookiecutter shark exhibits a number of specializations to its mouth and pharynx for its parasitic lifestyle. The shark first secures itself to the body surface of its prey by closing its spiracles and retracting its basihyal (tongue) to create pressure lower than that of the surroundings; its suctorial lips ensure a tight seal. It then bites, using its narrow upper teeth as anchors while its razor sharp lower teeth slice into the prey. Finally, the shark twists and rotates its body to complete a circular cut, quite possibly aided by the initial forward momentum and subsequent struggles of its prey. The action of the lower teeth may also be assisted by back-and-forth vibrations of the jaw, a mechanism akin to that of an electric carving knife. This shark's ability to create strong suction into its mouth probably also helps in capturing smaller prey such as squid.

=== Life history ===
Like other dogfish sharks, the cookiecutter shark is aplacental viviparous, with the developing embryos being sustained by yolk until birth. Females have two functional uteri and give birth to litters of 6 to 12 pups. A case has been recorded of a female carrying 9 embryos 12.4–13.7 cm (4.9–5.4 in) long; though they were close to the birth size, they still had well-developed yolk sacs, suggesting a slow rate of yolk absorption and a long gestation period. The embryos had developed brown pigmentation, but not the dark collar or differentiated dentition. Newborn cookiecutter sharks are 14–15 cm (5.5–5.9 in) long. Males attain sexual maturity at a length of 36 cm (14 in), and females at a length of 39 cm (15 in).

== Human interactions ==
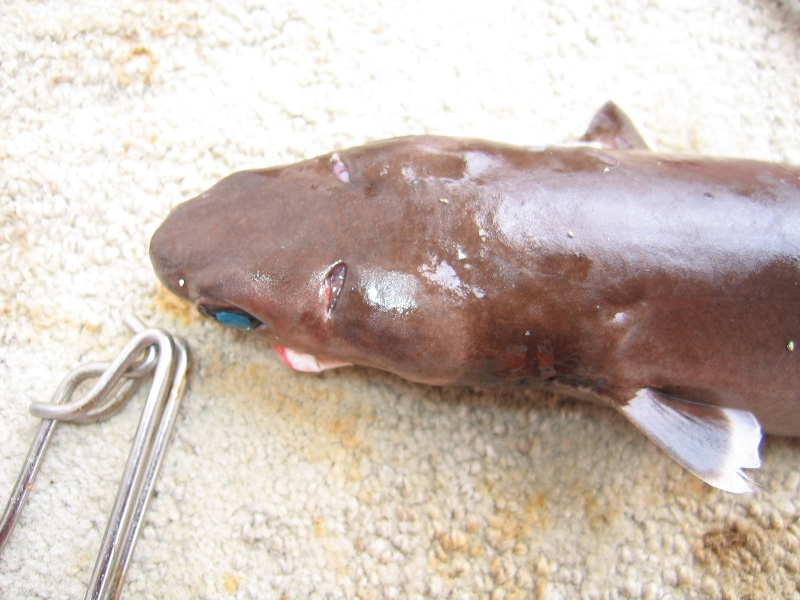
A cookiecutter shark is caught on a longline near Hawaii; large spiracles are located behind the eyes.

Favoring offshore waters and thus seldom encountered by humans, the cookiecutter shark is not considered dangerous because of its small size. However, it has been implicated in a few attacks on humans; in one case, a school of 30-cm (12 in) long fish with blunt snouts attacked an underwater photographer on an open-ocean dive. Similar reports have come from shipwreck survivors, of suffering small, clean, deep bites during the night. In March 2009, Maui resident Mike Spalding was bitten by a cookiecutter shark while swimming across the Alenuihaha Channel. Swimmer Eric Schall was bitten by a cookiecutter shark on March 31, 2019 while crossing the Kaiwi Channel, and suffered a large laceration to his abdomen. A second cookiecutter attack occurred in the same spot three weeks later: Isaiah Mojica was attempting the channel swim on April 6, 2019 as part of the Oceans Seven challenge when he was bitten on the left shoulder. A third person attempting to complete the swim was bitten in nearly the same area of the channel: Adherbal Treidler de Oliveira was attempting the swim on July 29, 2019, when he was bitten on the abdomen and on the left thigh. Two of the three swimmers were using electrical shark deterrents, but they did not deter the sharks. In 2017, a seven-year-old boy, Jack Tolley, was bitten in the leg while wading in Alma Bay in North Queensland with his family. The shark caused a 7.3 cm wound that was nearly down to the bone. On February 9, 2022, a deep-water swimmer off Kailua-Kona, Hawaii was bitten on the right foot and calf. In March 2023, Andy Walberer was attacked by two cookiecutter sharks while swimming the Molokai channel. He was able to grab and throw both sharks before serious injury was inflicted.

There are several records of human bodies recovered from the water with post-mortem cookiecutter shark bites.

During the 1970s, several U.S. Navy submarines were forced back to base to repair damage caused by cookiecutter shark bites to the neoprene boots of their AN/BQR-19 sonar domes, which caused the sound-transmitting oil inside to leak and impair navigation. An unknown enemy weapon was initially feared, before this shark was identified as the culprit; the problem was solved by installing fiberglass covers around the domes. In the 1980s, some 30 U.S. Navy submarines were damaged by cookiecutter shark bites, mostly to the rubber-sheathed electric cable leading to the sounding probe used to ensure safety when surfacing in shipping zones. Again, the solution was to apply a fiberglass coating. Oceanographic equipment and telecommunications cables have also been damaged by this species.

The harm inflicted by cookiecutter sharks on fishing nets and economically important species may have a minor detrimental effect on commercial fisheries. The shark itself is too small to be of value, and is only infrequently taken, as bycatch, on pelagic longlines and in midwater trawls and plankton nets. The lack of significant population threats, coupled with a worldwide distribution, has led the IUCN to assess the cookiecutter shark as of least concern. In June 2018 the New Zealand Department of Conservation classified the cookiecutter shark as "Not Threatened" with the qualifier "Secure Overseas" under the New Zealand Threat Classification System.
