= Ichthyococcus australis =

Scientific classification
- Domain: Eukaryota
- Kingdom: Animalia
- Phylum: Chordata
- Class: Actinopterygii
- Order: Stomiiformes
- Family: Phosichthyidae
- Genus: Ichthyococcus
- Species: I. australis

Binomial name
- Ichthyococcus australis Mukhacheva, 1980

Species of fish

Ichthyococcus australis is a species of the genus Ichthyococcus. It is also known as Southern lightfish.
