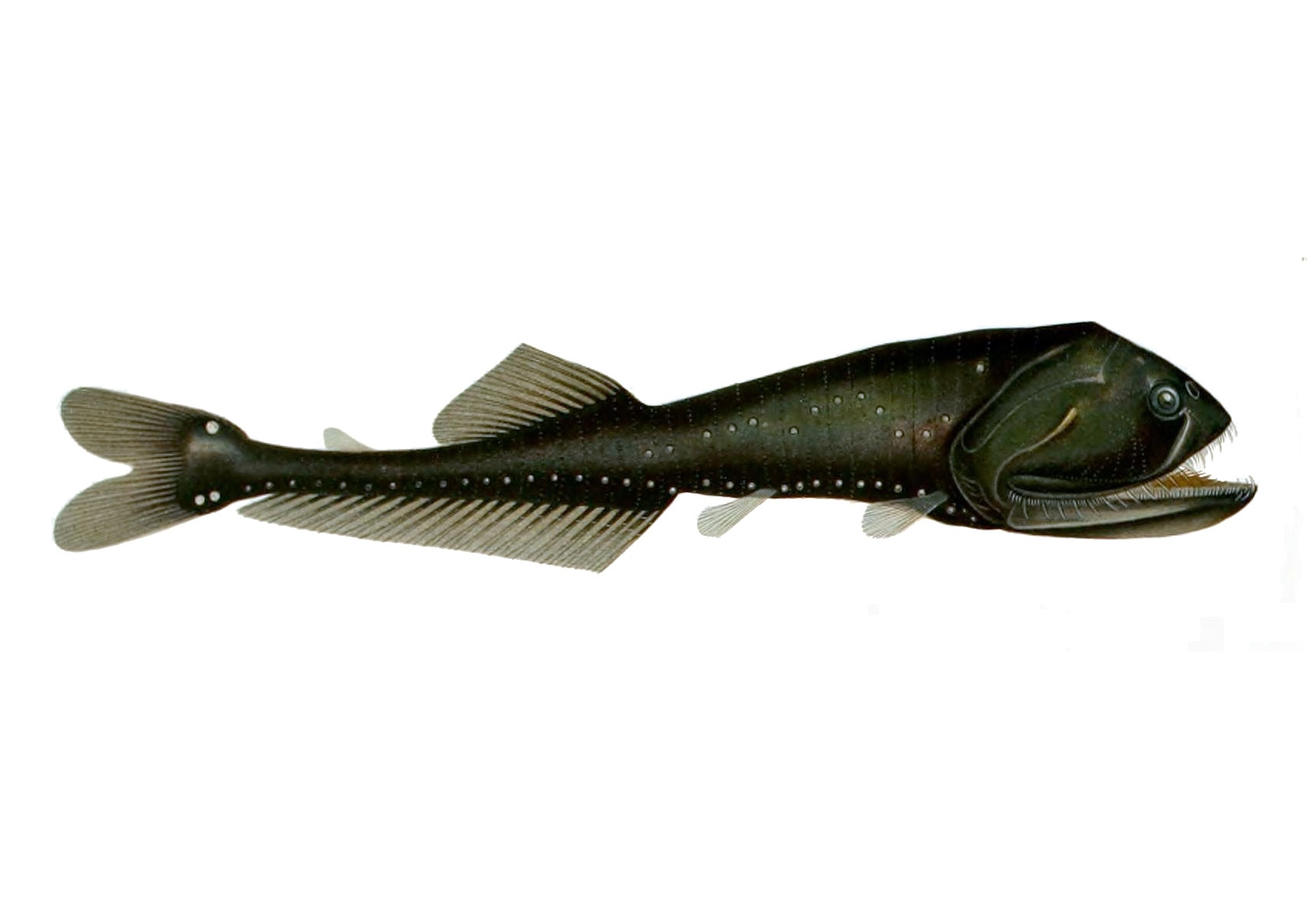

Conservation status
- Least Concern (IUCN 3.1)

Scientific classification
- Kingdom: Animalia
- Phylum: Chordata
- Class: Actinopterygii
- Order: Stomiiformes
- Family: Gonostomatidae
- Genus: Sigmops
- Species: S. bathyphilus

Binomial name
- Sigmops bathyphilus (Vaillant, 1884)

Synonyms
- Cyclothone grandis Vaillant, 1884; Gonostoma bathyphillum Vaillant, 1884; Gonostoma bathyphilum Vaillant, 1884; Gonostoma bathyphylum Vaillant, 1884; Gonostoma brevidens Kner, 1870; Gonostoma grande Collett, 1896; Gonostomia bathyphilum Vaillant, 1884; Neostoma bathyphilum Vaillant, 1884; Sigmops bathyphilum Vaillant, 1884

= Sigmops bathyphilus =

Species of fish

Sigmops bathyphilus, commonly called the spark anglemouth, deepsea fangjaw or deepsea lightfish, is a species of fish in the family Gonostomatidae (anglemouths). Through genomic data scientists were able to create distinctions within the historical gonostoma genus, creating Gonostomatidae with three genus, Sigmops, gonostoma, and Cyclothone. Before molecular phylogeny the conventional standard was gonostoma and cyclothone. Sigmops bathyphilus are also known to have a very low amount of chromosomes, 12 pairs to be exact.

== Description ==
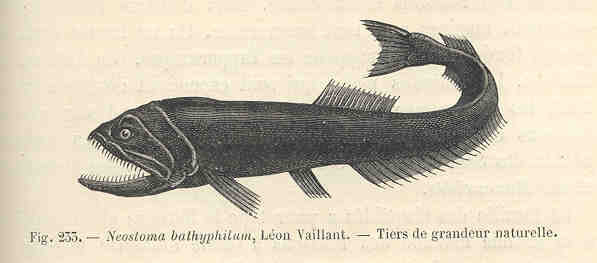
Drawing by Léon Vaillant, emphasizing the fish's sharp teeth

Sigmops are dark colored bristlemouths, morphologically distinct from light colored bristlemouths cyclothone. Sigmops bathyphilus is black in colour, with an elongate compressed body form, with a moderate size head. The mouth is large, a gape that extends far past their tiny eyes. Sigmops bathyphilus has a row of longer teeth along their bottom jaw, with smaller teeth in between the longer ones. Sigmops bathyphilus has a row of palatine teeth on the top of their mouth. It has 24-27 gill rakers. An Adipose fin is present. The body size varies between the maximum length of 20 cm (7.9 in) for the female and 15 cm (5.9 in) for the male, with no scales along their body. There are a ventral row of irregularly placed photopores. It has 11–15 dorsal soft rays and 22–26 anal soft rays. Out of the sigmops genus, bathyphilus is the only species that does not possess eye-facing photophores, suggesting that Sigmops bathyphilus does not counterilluminate.

== Variation Among Genus ==
The genus of Sigmops has very small differences that are important when distinguishing between the species.

Between Sigmops bathyphilus and Sigmops elongatus the biggest difference is in their coloration, while both dark-colored bristlemouths, Sigmops elongatus has a silvery metallic appearance laterally, and less gill rakers than Sigmops bathyphilus. The size of each fish is also incredibly descriptive, with Sigmops bathyphilus ranging from 15-20cm, and Sigmpos elongatus is closer to 25-30cm.

== Distribution ==
The Sigmops bathyphilus is located in the Atlantic Ocean, as well as the Indian ocean off the coast of Australia. Primary distribution is along the African deep sea waters, as well as the southern coast of Australia. Along Marine mesopelagic and benthic water columns. The gonostomidae family that Sigmops bathyphilus belongs to is known to have a high population density, one of the most abundant deep sea fish in the ocean. Due to the inability to bring Sigmops bathyphilus to the surface without dying due to pressure changes, further population surveys would be difficult to complete without damaging said population. It is bathypelagic, living at depths of 700–3,000 m (2,300–9,800 ft), hence its specific name, from Greek words meaning "depth-loving". There is stratification of size with depth, meaning that smaller of the species exist at higher depths and larger of the species exist at lower depths.

== Ecology ==
The ecology of the broad Sigmops genus is sparse, primarily because of the lack of research done on the genus because of the benthic regions in which they primarily reside. Research is difficult to complete in their habitat, as are ethical surveys of the species because the Sigmops bathyphilus can not survive the changes in pressure from catching, resulting in near immediate mortality. The Gonostomatidae family ecology can be inferred from the genera that complete diel vertical distribution, a type of migration that gives the genus the ability to regulate the pressure differences.

Once surveying the stomach contents of the C. braveri specimens, results showed that the primary prey that they fed on were Calanoid copepods. These are a predominant form of zooplankton that is widely available. A significantly smaller portion of their diet is made up of particulate organic matter, which consists mainly of soil components, and decomposed organic residues. With similar morphological characteristics to the Sigmops Bathyphilus, we can assume that they also do a portion of filter feeding on similar zooplankton. Due to the abiotic factors of their habitat, it is likely that Sigmops bathyphilus are opportunistic feeders, and could potentially consume smaller fish or invertebrates, using their jagged rows of teeth for grabbing prey.

== Reproduction ==
Sigmops bathyphilus undergoes sex reversal (from male to female) due to size constraints as well. Sigmops bathyphilus are protrandrous, meaning that in a hermaphrodite the male reproductive organs mature first, and female reproductive organs second. Males exist at a length of 5–10 cm (2.0–3.9 in), with females spawning once they reach 11 cm (4.3 in), where Some individuals are "super males", who do not change sex and are the principal spawners. It is noted in research that the hermaphroditic animals were typically within .70cm and .99cm had predominantly male characteristics that are mature, it is suggested that these males of the species would selectively mate with early-maturing females (females who grow quickly). It is an important distinction between other species of the genus that Sigmops Bathyphilus does not reproduce on a seasonal or cyclical basis, suggesting that all sexual forms of Sigmops bathyphilus exist within a population all the time. Research has shown as well that Sigmops bathyphilus distinctively are not of a specific size in order to be male, which is the case for the other genus.

With limited data on Sigmops bathyphilus larval stages, there is information of a sister species Sigmops longipinnis larval stages that can be assumed to Sigmops bathyphilus. The determining factor of Gonostomidae family on larvae is photophores along the bottoms of their eyes, rather than above their reduced eyes. Furthermore, the gonostoma and sigmops distinction is through the level of pigment near the anal fin base, Sigmops genus have no pigment on the anal fin base. Sigmops bathyphilus is the only species that does not retain their photophores underneath their eyes into adulthood. Larvae do not develop adipose tissue until adulthood. Sigmops bathyphilus larvae have 11-13 anal fin rays. Gonostomidae as a family typically range from 12-16 preanal myomeres (usually 15-16 before, 12-13 during transformation), 31-33 (usually 31-32) total myomeres. Larvae live on the top of the water column, and as metamorphosis is completed the juveniles will sink to the bathypelagic water column.

== Conservation Status ==
No fisheries for this species. This species does not serve human function or cultural importance. This species is difficult to quantify because of their bathypelagic habitat, the shifting in pressure from moving up kills this species, meaning they are unable to be studied or utilized in a lab setting. These fish seem to be caught as bycatch in commercial fisheries, but it's suspected that due to the depth they live at, and their small size, they are rarely caught. No conservation concerns.
