= Ichthyococcus parini =

Scientific classification
- Domain: Eukaryota
- Kingdom: Animalia
- Phylum: Chordata
- Class: Actinopterygii
- Order: Stomiiformes
- Family: Phosichthyidae
- Genus: Ichthyococcus
- Species: I. parini

Binomial name
- Ichthyococcus parini Mukhacheva, 1980

Species of fish

Ichthyococcus parini is a lightfish of the genus Ichthyococcus.
