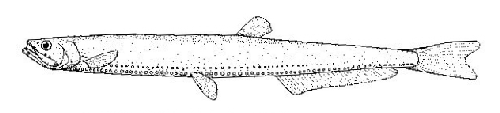
- Drawing by Dr Tony Ayling

Scientific classification
- Kingdom: Animalia
- Phylum: Chordata
- Class: Actinopterygii
- Order: Stomiiformes
- Family: Diplophidae
- Genus: Diplophos
- Species: D. rebainsi

Binomial name
- Diplophos rebainsi G. Krefft & Parin, 1972

= Diplophos rebainsi =

Species of fish

Diplophos rebainsi, Rebains' portholefish, is a bristlemouth of the family Gonostomatidae, found in the south-east and west Pacific, and the South Atlantic oceans.
