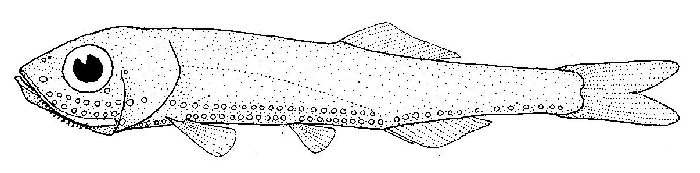
- Drawing by Dr Tony Ayling

Scientific classification
- Domain: Eukaryota
- Kingdom: Animalia
- Phylum: Chordata
- Class: Actinopterygii
- Order: Stomiiformes
- Family: Phosichthyidae
- Genus: Vinciguerria
- Species: V. nimbaria

Binomial name
- Vinciguerria nimbaria (D. S. Jordan & T. M. Williams, 1895)

Synonyms
- Zalarges nimbarius Jordan and Williams, 1895; Vinciguerria sanzoi Jespersen & Tåning, 1919

= Oceanic lightfish =

Species of fish

The oceanic lightfish (Vinciguerria nimbaria) a lightfish of the genus Vinciguerria, is found in all deep tropical and subtropical oceans and seas, from depths of 20 to 5,000 m. Its length is between 2 and 5 cm. It is the main prey of tuna during the tuna fishing season (late autumn and winter) in the equatorial Atlantic. Its own diet is varied and is dependent on its location. In equatorial locations it has been found to behave as a mesopelagic fish and as an opportunistic mesozooplankton feeder, whilst further north in oligotrophic typical tropical structures it was found to behave as an epipelagic fish, feeding on the dominant small prey during the daytime.
