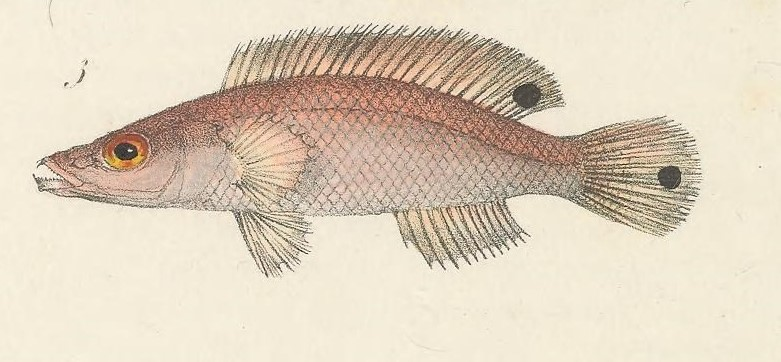

Conservation status
- Least Concern (IUCN 3.1)

Scientific classification
- Kingdom: Animalia
- Phylum: Chordata
- Class: Actinopterygii
- Order: Labriformes
- Family: Labridae
- Genus: Lappanella
- Species: L. fasciata

Binomial name
- Lappanella fasciata (Cocco, 1833)

Synonyms
- Coricus fasciatus Cocco, 1833; Marzapannus fasciatus (Cocco, 1833); Ctenolabrus iris Valenciennes, 1839

= Lappanella fasciata =

Species of fish

The iris wrasse (Lappanella fasciata) is a species of marine ray-finned fish from the family Labridae, the wrasses. It is found in the eastern Atlantic Ocean from Portugal to Morocco, as well as Madeira and the Azores, and in the Mediterranean Sea as far east as the Adriatic Sea. It lives in deep, rock areas where it feeds on crabs, molluscs and polychaete worms.

Lappanella fasciata was first formally described as Coricus fasciatus by the Italian naturalist Anastasio Cocco (1799–1854) with the type locality given as Messina on Sicily. The French zoologist Achille Valenciennes (1794–1865) later named Ctenolabrus iris from Naples, Sicily and Malta and David Starr Jordan used this as the type species when he raised the genus Lappanella, albeit as a subgenus of Ctenolabrus, in 1890.
