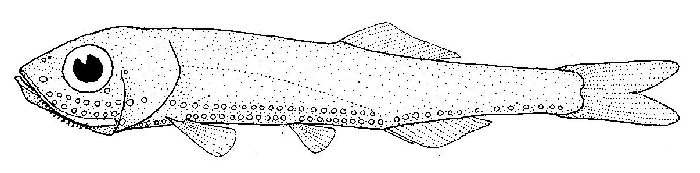
- V. nimbaria pictured

Scientific classification
- Kingdom: Animalia
- Phylum: Chordata
- Class: Actinopterygii
- Order: Stomiiformes
- Family: Vinciguerriidae
- Genus: Vinciguerria; D. S. Jordan & Evermann, 1896

Species
- See text

Synonyms
- †Eovinciguerria Prokofiev, 2002; †Sytchevskia Prokofiev, 2002

= Vinciguerria =

Vinciguerria Temporal range: Eocene–recent, 48.6–0 Ma

Genus of fishes

Vinciguerria is a genus of lightfishes, family Phosichthyidae. It is named for Dr. Decio Vinciguerra (1856–1934), an Italian ichthyologist.

== Included species ==
There are currently five extant species recognized in this genus:

- Vinciguerria attenuata (Cocco, 1838) (Slender lightfish)
- Vinciguerria lucetia (Garman, 1899) (Panama lightfish)
- Vinciguerria mabahiss R. K. Johnson & Feltes, 1984
- Vinciguerria nimbaria (D. S. Jordan & T. M. Williams, 1895) (Oceanic lightfish)
- Vinciguerria poweriae (Cocco, 1838) (Power's deep-water bristle-mouth fish)

There are also at least five prehistoric species only known from fossils:

- †Vinciguerria distincta Daniltshenko, 1962 (=Sytchevskia) (middle Eocene of Georgia)
- †Vinciguerria merklini (Daniltshenko, 1946) (early Oligocene of eastern Europe)
- †Vinciguerria obscura Daniltshenko, 1946 (=Eovinciguerria) (Miocene of eastern Europe)
- †Vinciguerria orientalis Nam, Ko & Nazarkin, 2019 (middle Miocene of South Korea)
- †Vinciguerria shinjiensis Yabumoto, Nomura & Nazarkin, 2024 (middle Miocene of Japan)

The former fossil genera Eovinciguerria and Sytchevskia have been synonymized with this genus due to their close morphological similarities to it.
