= Slim lightfish =

Ichthyococcus elongatus

Scientific classification
- Domain: Eukaryota
- Kingdom: Animalia
- Phylum: Chordata
- Class: Actinopterygii
- Order: Stomiiformes
- Family: Phosichthyidae
- Genus: Ichthyococcus
- Species: I. elongatus

Binomial name
- Ichthyococcus elongatus S. Imai, 1941

Species of fish

Slim lightfish, also known as Ichthyococcus elongatus, is a species of the genus Ichthyococcus.
