= Diplophos australis =

Scientific classification
- Domain: Eukaryota
- Kingdom: Animalia
- Phylum: Chordata
- Class: Actinopterygii
- Order: Stomiiformes
- Family: Gonostomatidae
- Genus: Diplophos
- Species: D. australis

Binomial name
- Diplophos australis Ozawa, Oda & Ida, 1990

Species of Actinopterygii

Diplophos australis is a species of stomiiformes in the family Gonostomatidae.
