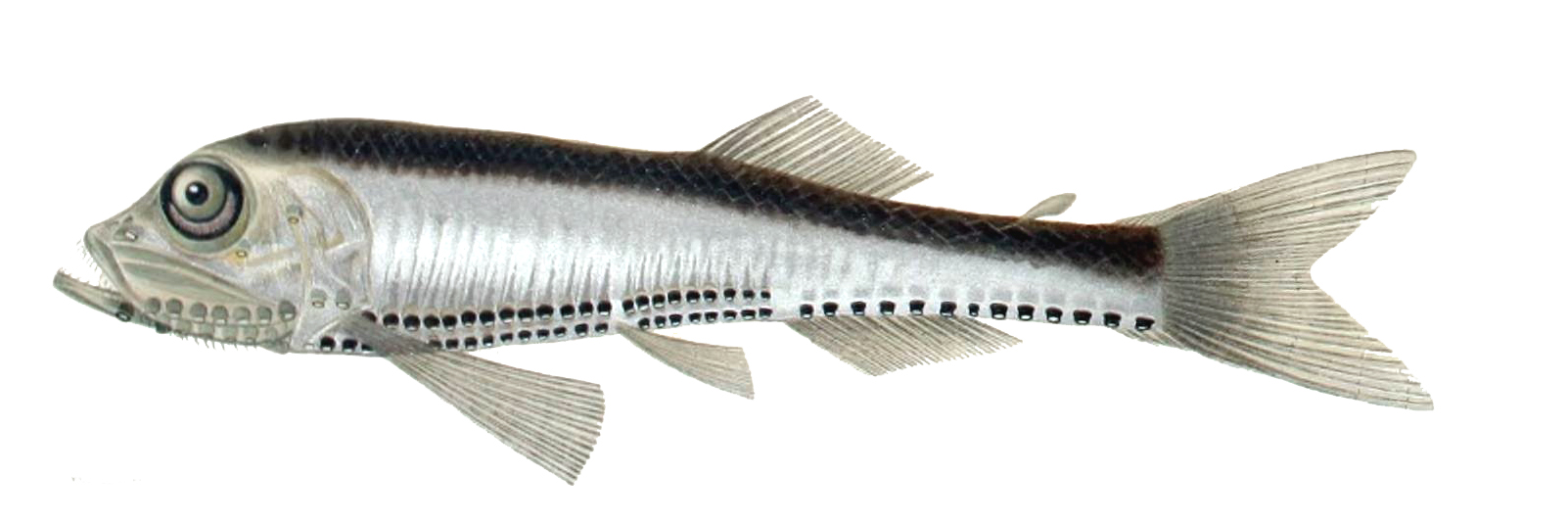

Scientific classification
- Domain: Eukaryota
- Kingdom: Animalia
- Phylum: Chordata
- Class: Actinopterygii
- Order: Stomiiformes
- Family: Phosichthyidae
- Genus: Vinciguerria
- Species: V. attenuata

Binomial name
- Vinciguerria attenuata (Cocco, 1838)

Synonyms
- Maurolicus attenuatus Cocco, 1838; Vinciguerria atrenuata (Cocco, 1838)

= Vinciguerria attenuata =

Species of fish

Vinciguerria attenuata, commonly known as the slender lightfish, is a small species of ray-finned fish in the family Phosichthyidae, found in deep water in warmer parts of the Atlantic, the Indian and Pacific Oceans.

== Description ==
Vinciguerria attenuata is a moderately elongate fish with a tapering body growing to a length of about 45 mm (1.8 in). The eyes are slightly tubular and set close together, giving vision both upwards and sideways. The mouth is large, with a single row of teeth, some long and some short. The dorsal fin has 13 to 15 soft rays and is set in front of a small adipose fin (a small fleshy fin without supporting rays). The pectoral fins have 9 to 10 soft rays, the pelvic fins 6 to 7 and the anal fin 13 to 16. There are photophores (light-producing organs) on the lower half of the head and in rows on the underside of the fish. The dorsal surface of the body is dark, the flanks are silvery and the fins are colourless, without streaks.

== Distribution and habitat ==
V. attenuata is found in the warmer parts of the Atlantic Ocean, the Caribbean Sea, the Gulf of Mexico and the Mediterranean Sea, and also the Indian Ocean and much of the Pacific Ocean, between about 48°N and 57°S. It is mainly a mesopelagic fish, making short diel vertical migrations, remaining at depths of between about 250 and 600 m (800 and 2,000 ft) during the day and rising to between 100 and 500 m (300 and 1,600 ft) at night. Both adults and juveniles are commonly caught between 250 and 300 m (800 and 1,000 ft). The pre-metamorphic larvae are found at a similar depth, but during metamorphosis, the larvae descend to between 300 and 700 m (1,000 and 2,300 ft).

== Ecology ==
The diet of V. attenuata consists of planktonic organisms, particularly crustaceans such as copepods. The sexes are separate and breeding takes place throughout the year, but mostly in spring and summer. Both eggs and larvae form part of the plankton. The larvae undergo metamorphosis when about 17 to 19 mm (0.67 to 0.75 in) long and it is at this time that the photophores develop.
