= Triplophos =

Scientific classification
- Kingdom: Animalia
- Phylum: Chordata
- Class: Actinopterygii
- Order: Stomiiformes
- Family: Gonostomatidae
- Genus: Triplophos; A. B. Brauer, 1902
- Species: T. hemingi

Binomial name
- Triplophos hemingi (McArdle, 1901)

Species of fish

Triplophos hemingi is a species of bristlemouth found in the Atlantic Ocean. It is the only known species of the genus Triplophos. This species grows to a length of 36 centimetres (14 in) SL.
