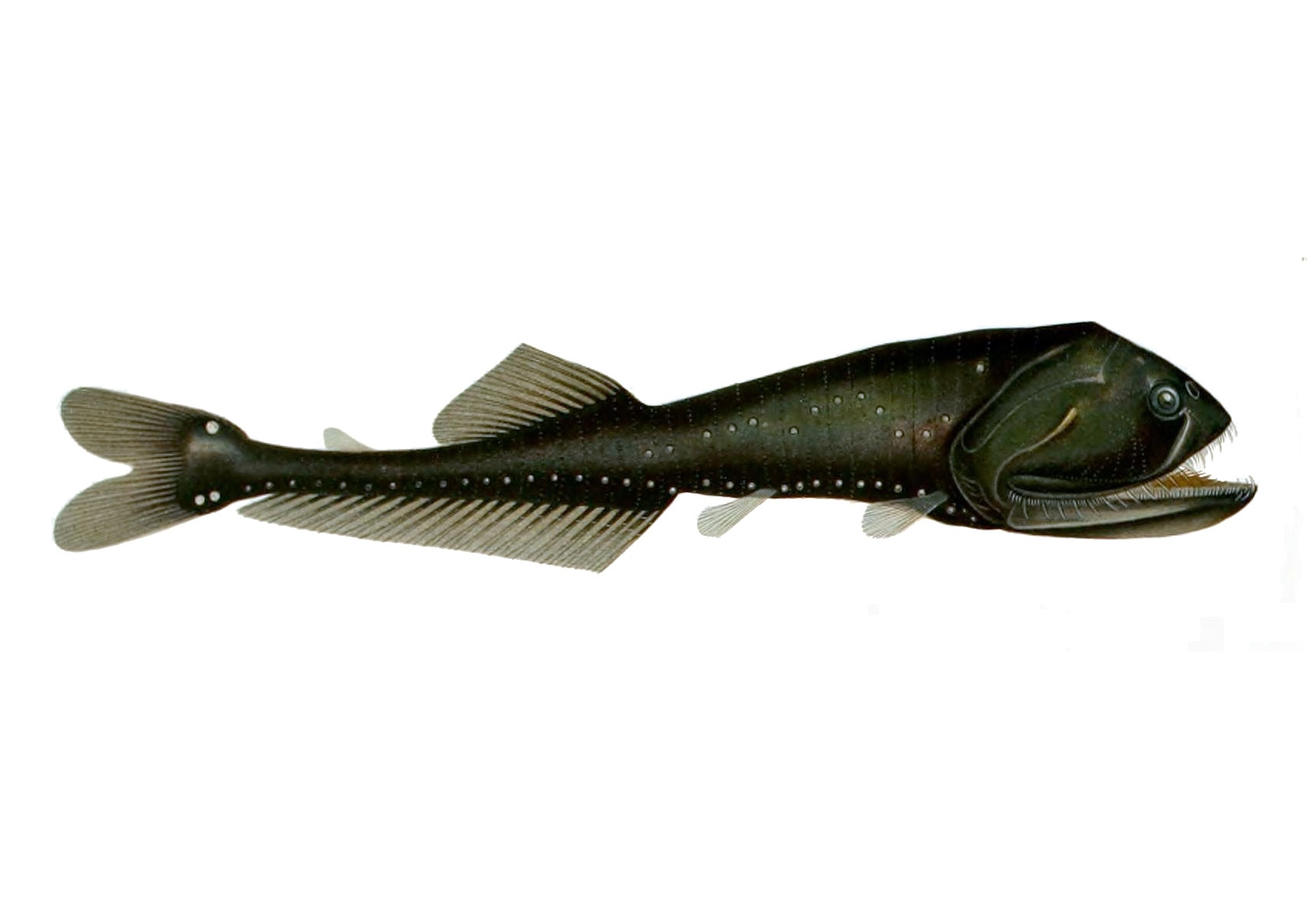
- Sigmops bathyphilus

Scientific classification
- Domain: Eukaryota
- Kingdom: Animalia
- Phylum: Chordata
- Class: Actinopterygii
- Order: Stomiiformes
- Family: Gonostomatidae
- Genus: Sigmops; T. N. Gill, 1883

= Sigmops =

Genus of fishes

Sigmops is a genus of bristlemouths.

== Species ==
There are currently four recognized species in this genus:

- Sigmops bathyphilus (Vaillant, 1884) (spark anglemouth)
- Sigmops ebelingi (Grey, 1960) (Ebeling's fangjaw)
- Sigmops elongatus (Günther, 1878)
- Sigmops gracilis (Günther, 1878) (slender fangjaw)
- Sigmops longipinnis (Mukhacheva, 1972)
