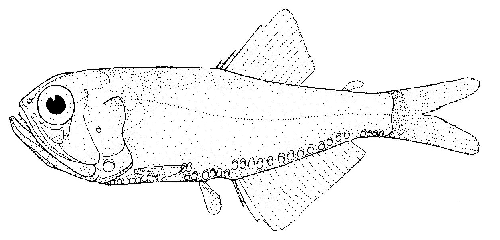
- Bighead Portholefish (M. obtusirostra)

Scientific classification
- Domain: Eukaryota
- Kingdom: Animalia
- Phylum: Arthropoda
- Class: Insecta
- Order: Hymenoptera
- Family: Formicidae
- Subfamily: Formicinae
- Tribe: Camponotini
- Genus: Margrethia; Jespersen & Tåning, 1919

= Margrethia =

Genus of fishes

Margrethia is a genus of bristlemouths.

== Species ==
There are currently two recognized species in this genus:

- Margrethia obtusirostra Jespersen & Tåning, 1919 (Bighead portholefish)
- Margrethia valentinae Parin, 1982
