= Mike Spalding =

American swimmer (born 1947)

Personal information
- Born: 1947 (age 78–79) O'ahu, Hawaii, United States

Sport
- Sport: Swimming
- Strokes: Long-distance swimming

Mike Spalding (born 1947) is a marathon swimmer, and one of only two people to have swum all nine channels of the main Hawaiian Islands. He lives on Maui.

On March 16, 2009 Spalding became one of the few humans to be attacked by the deep water cookiecutter shark. He was bitten by one of the sharks while swimming between the islands of Hawai'i and Maui in what is referred to as the Alenuihaha Channel. The attack occurred at 8:15 pm 10 miles off Upolu point. The cookiecutter shark was attracted to squid that were in turn drawn to the light on the escort boat. Just before the attack the swimmer felt squid bumping into him while swimming. The cookiecutter shark first attached itself to the upper torso but did not bite as it was scared away by the swimming motion. On exiting the water into the escort kayak the second bite took a round cookiecutter chunk of flesh out of the lower left calf. Spalding completed the crossing a year and a half later without incident except for the appearance of an oceanic whitetip shark in the same vicinity of the cookiecutter shark incident.

== Accomplishments ==
All were solo swims except for the Kaieiewaho Channel, which was a six-person relay. They were accomplished in the following order.

- Auau Channel, August 15, 1983, Lanai to Maui (8.2 miles), 6:13
- Pailolo Channel, November 30, 1990, Maui to Molokai (8.5 miles), 4:47
- Alalakeiki Channel, April 14, 2001, Maui to Kahoolawe (7.5 miles), 3:30
- Kaulakahi Channel, July 20, 2003, Kauai to Niihau (17 miles), 10:45
- Kealaikahiki Channel, September 11, 2005, Kahoolawe to Lanai (18.5 miles), 11:53
- Kalohi Channel, August 5, 2007, Molokai to Lanai (9.3 miles), 6:47
- Kaiwi Channel, September 20, 2007, Molokai to Oahu (26 miles), 15:15
- Kaieiewaho Channel, November 20, 2010, Oahu to Kauai (72-mile relay), 47:55
- Alenuihaha Channel, February 27, 2011, Hawaii to Maui (30 miles), 19:46

Mike Spalding was inducted into the Outrigger Duke Kahanamoku Hall of Fame in 2021
