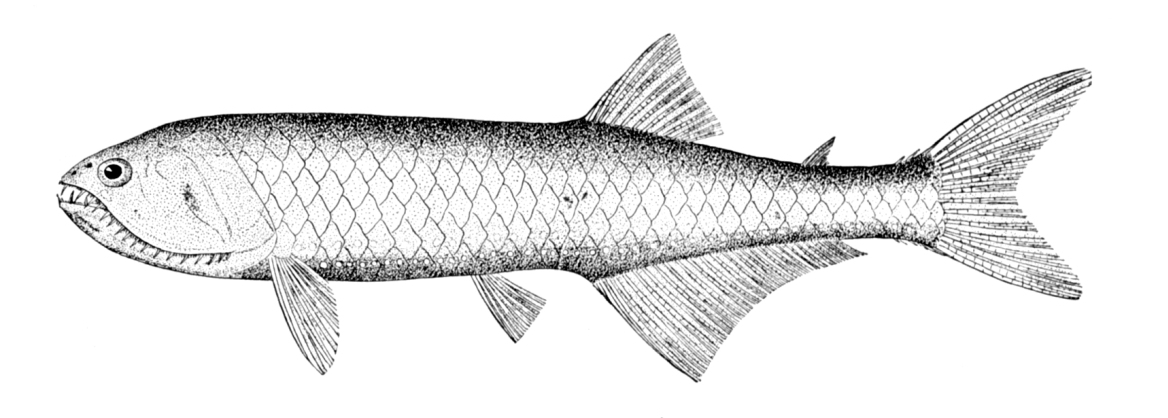
- Gonostoma denudatum
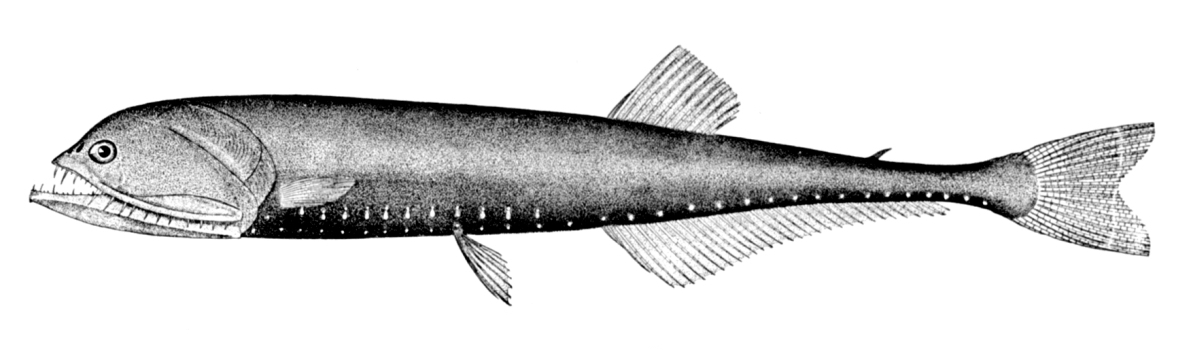
- Gonostoma elongatum

Scientific classification
- Kingdom: Animalia
- Phylum: Chordata
- Class: Actinopterygii
- Order: Stomiiformes
- Family: Gonostomatidae
- Genus: Gonostoma; Rafinesque, 1810

= Gonostoma =

Gonostoma Temporal range: Oligocene–Recent

Genus of fishes

Gonostoma is a genus of bristlemouths.

== Species ==
There are three extant species recognized in this genus:

- Gonostoma atlanticum Norman, 1930 (Atlantic fangjaw)
- Gonostoma denudatum Rafinesque, 1810
- Gonostoma elongatum Günther, 1878 (Elongated bristlemouth fish)

The following fossil species are known:

- †Gonostoma albyi (Sauvage, 1873) - latest Miocene (Messinian) of Algeria.
- †Gonostoma dracula Grădianu et al., 2017 - Oligocene of Romania (at the time in the Paratethys Sea)
