= Manducus =

Scientific classification
- Kingdom: Animalia
- Phylum: Chordata
- Class: Actinopterygii
- Order: Stomiiformes
- Family: Diplophidae
- Genus: Manducus; Goode & T. H. Bean, 1896

Genus of fishes

Manducus is a genus of portholefish, a family of deep-sea stomiiform fish. They were formerly placed in the bristlemouth family Gonostomatidae.

== Species ==
There are currently two recognized species in this genus:

- Manducus greyae (R. K. Johnson, 1970)
- Manducus maderensis (J. Y. Johnson, 1890)
