= Bulldog lightfish =

Ichthyococcus irregularis

Scientific classification
- Kingdom: Animalia
- Phylum: Chordata
- Class: Actinopterygii
- Order: Stomiiformes
- Family: Ichthyococcidae
- Genus: Ichthyococcus
- Species: I. irregularis

Binomial name
- Ichthyococcus irregularis Rechnitzer & J. E. Böhlke, 1958

Species of fish

Bulldog lightfish, also known as Ichthyococcus irregularis, is a species of the genus Ichthyococcus.
