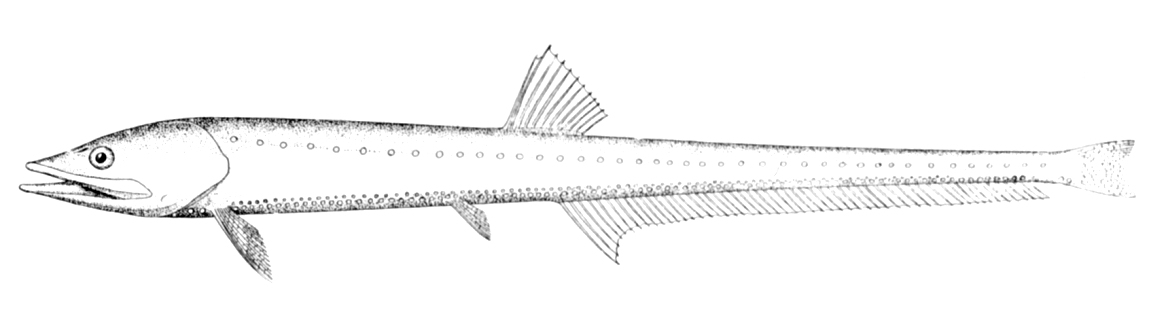
- Pacific Portholefish (D. taenia)
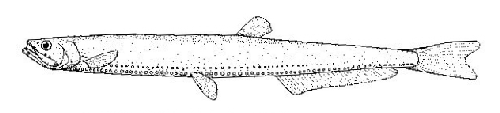
- Rebains' Portholefish (D. rebainsi)

Scientific classification
- Kingdom: Animalia
- Phylum: Chordata
- Class: Actinopterygii
- Order: Stomiiformes
- Family: Diplophidae
- Genus: Diplophos; Günther, 1873

= Diplophos =

Genus of fishes

Diplophos is a genus of marine ray-finned fish in the family Diplophidae, commonly known as portholefish. They were formerly placed in the bristlemouth family Gonostomatidae.

== Species ==
There are currently five recognized species in this genus:

- Diplophos australis Ozawa, Oda & T. Ida, 1990
- Diplophos orientalis Matsubara, 1940
- Diplophos pacificus Günther, 1889
- Diplophos rebainsi G. Krefft & Parin, 1972 (Rebains' portholefish)
- Diplophos taenia Günther, 1873 (Pacific portholefish)
