= Ichthyococcus polli =

Scientific classification
- Kingdom: Animalia
- Phylum: Chordata
- Class: Actinopterygii
- Order: Stomiiformes
- Family: Ichthyococcidae
- Genus: Ichthyococcus
- Species: I. polli

Binomial name
- Ichthyococcus polli Blache, 1963

Species of fish

Ichthyococcus polli is a lightfish of the genus Ichthyococcus.
