= Vinciguerria lucetia =

Scientific classification
- Kingdom: Animalia
- Phylum: Chordata
- Class: Actinopterygii
- Order: Stomiiformes
- Family: Vinciguerriidae
- Genus: Vinciguerria
- Species: V. lucetia

Binomial name
- Vinciguerria lucetia Garman, 1899

Synonyms
- Maurolicus lucetius Garman, 1899; Vinciguerria lucetius (Garman, 1899); Vinciguerria lutecia (Garman, 1899)

Species of fish

Vinciguerria lucetia is a species of marine ray-finned fish in the genus Vinciguerria known by the common name Panama lightfish. It is a small bioluminescent fish, with two rows of tiny photophores along its body. It is very abundant in the tropical Indo-Pacific where it makes large vertical migrations each day.

== Description ==
Vinciguerria lucetia is a small fish growing to a maximum length of about 5 cm (2 in). It is an elongated, laterally compressed species with a disproportionately large head which is compressed and conical, with a wide mouth and pointed snout. There are photophores on the head and two lateral rows of pearl-like photophores on the underside of the body. The dorsal fin is short and consists of thirteen to fourteen soft rays. The origin of the anal fin, which consists of fourteen to fifteen soft rays, is below the rear of the dorsal fin. The pectoral fins are set low on the body and the caudal fin is deeply forked. The dorsal surface of this fish is blackish, with a few dark-coloured transverse stripes, and the flanks and belly are silvery. There is a black spot at the tip of the tail.

== Distribution and habitat ==
Vinciguerria lucetia is found in the equatorial water mass of the western Central Pacific and the Eastern Pacific at depths between about 100 and 500 m (300 and 1,600 ft). This fish is one of several that dominate the fauna of the Southern California Bight and which tend to make diel vertical migrations, rising to near the surface to feed at night and descending again to remain quiescent by day.

== Ecology ==
Vinciguerria lucetia is an epipelagic and mesopelagic species. It is oviparous, the eggs and larvae drifting as part of the plankton. The photophores appear during the course of metamorphosis from larval to juvenile fish; these may be involved in camouflage, species or sexual identification or prey attraction. This fish feed on copepods, krill and sergestid shrimps, crustaceans which also tend to make diel vertical migrations.
