= Lappanella guineensis =

Conservation status
- Data Deficient (IUCN 3.1)

Scientific classification
- Kingdom: Animalia
- Phylum: Chordata
- Class: Actinopterygii
- Order: Labriformes
- Family: Labridae
- Genus: Lappanella
- Species: L. guineensis

Binomial name
- Lappanella guineensis Bauchot, 1969

Species of fish

Lapanella guineensis is a species of marine ray-finned fish from the family Labridae, the wrasses. It is found in the eastern Atlantic Ocean, at depths of no less than 100 metres (330 ft) in rocky areas, off the coasts of Sierra Leone and Guinea.
