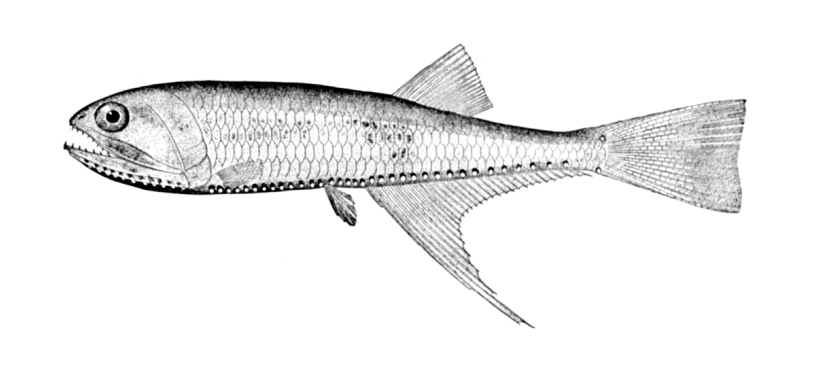

Scientific classification
- Kingdom: Animalia
- Phylum: Chordata
- Class: Actinopterygii
- Order: Stomiiformes
- Family: Gonostomatidae
- Genus: Zaphotias; Goode & T. H. Bean, 1898
- Species: Z. pedaliotus

Binomial name
- Zaphotias pedaliotus (Goode & T. H. Bean, 1898)

Synonyms
- Bonapartia pedaliota Zaphotias nudum Zaphotias photocephalus

= Zaphotias pedaliotus =

Species of fish

Zaphotias pedaliotus, the longray fangjaw, is a species of bristlemouth found in the Atlantic and Indian Oceans. It is the only described species in its genus. This species grows to a standard length (SL) of 7.2 centimetres (2.8 in).

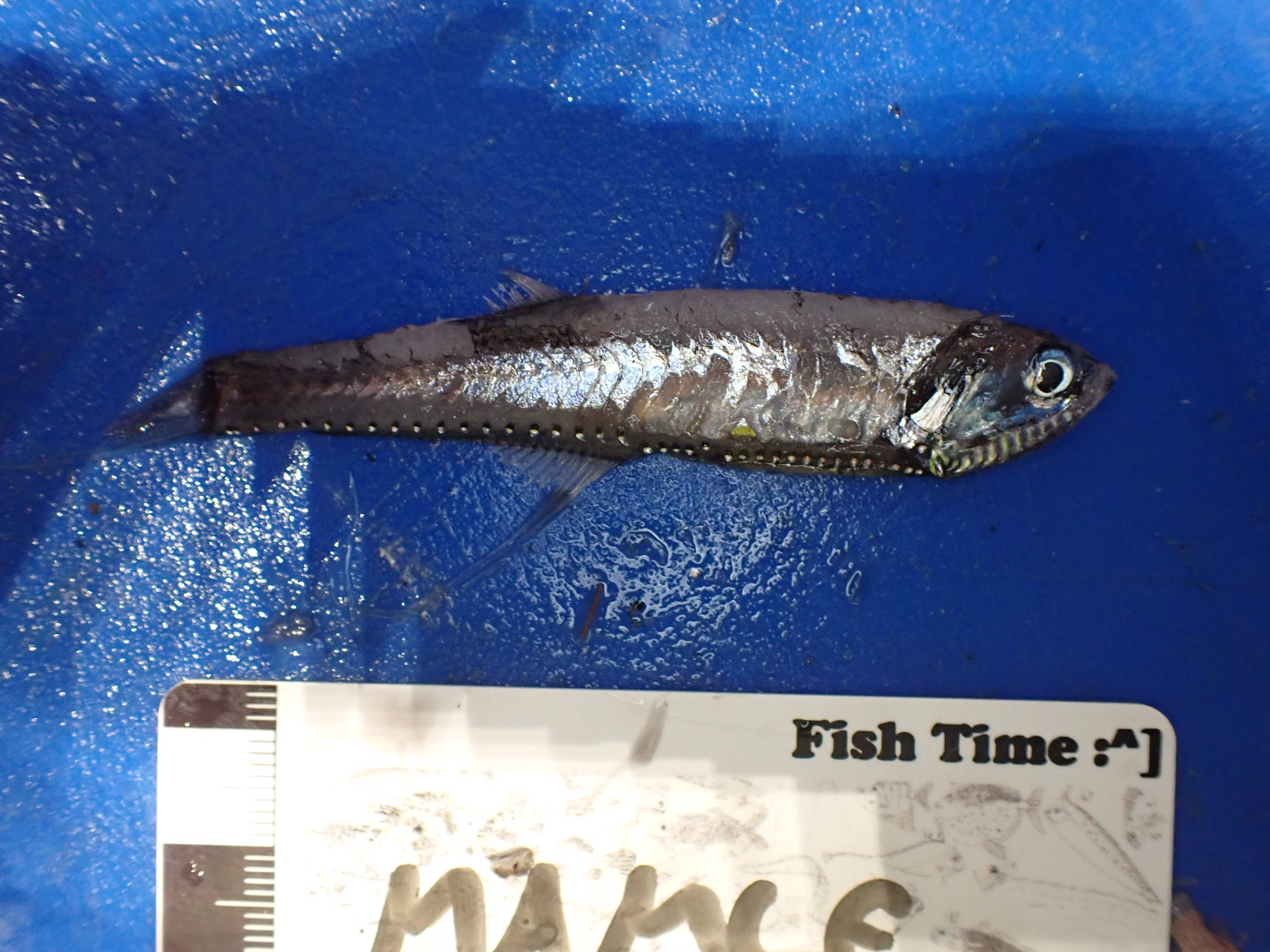
Specimen of Zaphotias pedaliotus
