= Woodsia (fish) =

Scientific classification
- Domain: Eukaryota
- Kingdom: Animalia
- Phylum: Chordata
- Class: Actinopterygii
- Order: Stomiiformes
- Family: Phosichthyidae
- Genus: Woodsia; M. G. Grey, 1959

Genus of fishes

Woodsia is a genus of lightfishes.

== Species ==
There are currently two recognized species in this genus:

- Woodsia meyerwaardeni G. Krefft, 1973 (Austral lightfish)
- Woodsia nonsuchae (Beebe, 1932) (Bigeye lightfish)
