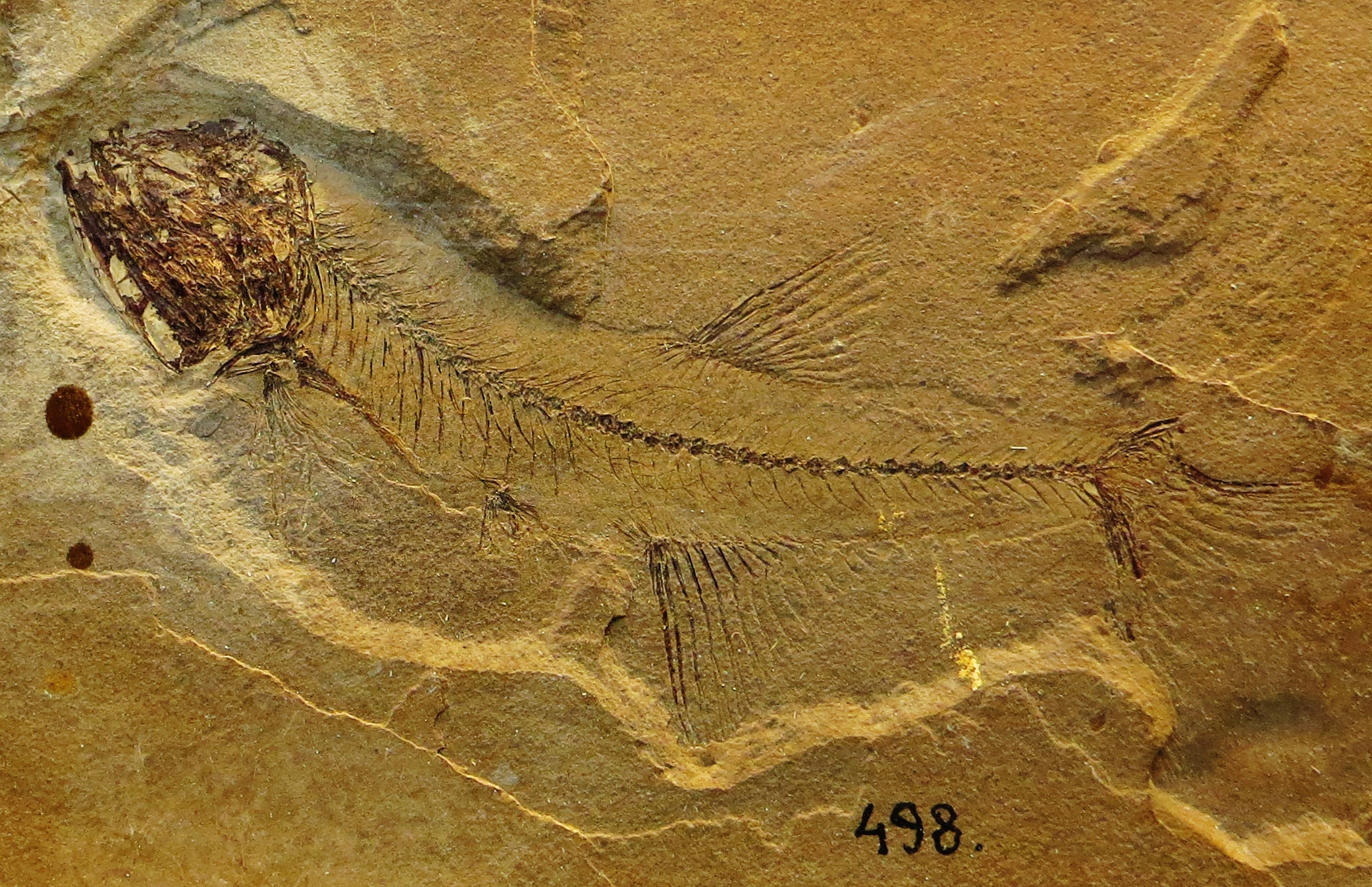
- Scopeloides glarisianus

Scientific classification
- Kingdom: Animalia
- Phylum: Chordata
- Class: Actinopterygii
- Genus: †Scopeloides; Wettstein, 1887

= Scopeloides =

Scopeloides Temporal range: Early Oligocene

Scopeloides is an extinct genus of prehistoric ray-finned fish that lived during the early Oligocene epoch.

Scopeloides belongs to the order Stomiiformes (mouth-spined fish) and the family Gonostomatidae (bristle-mouthed fish). A distinctive and characteristic feature is the presence of light-emitting organs (photophores), which identify them as mesopelagic deep-sea fish. Anatomically, they are closely related to the extant genus Gonostoma.

The most extensively studied species is Scopeloides glarisianus. Its fossils are regularly found in Europe, for example in the Menlit Shale of the Carpathians (Poland) or in the Czech Republic and Romania.

Analyses of fossil stomach contents show that they fed primarily on small crustaceans (zooplankton) such as copepods.

The word is derived from the Greek *skopelos* (which is often used in a biological context to refer to lanternfish) and the suffix *-oides* (“similar to”). It therefore translates to “lanternfish-like.” Adjective (scopeloid): In the English-speaking world, there is also the obsolete adjective “scopeloid,” which describes fish that resemble lanternfish or are related to the historical family Scopelidae.

== See also ==
- Prehistoric fish
- List of prehistoric bony fish
