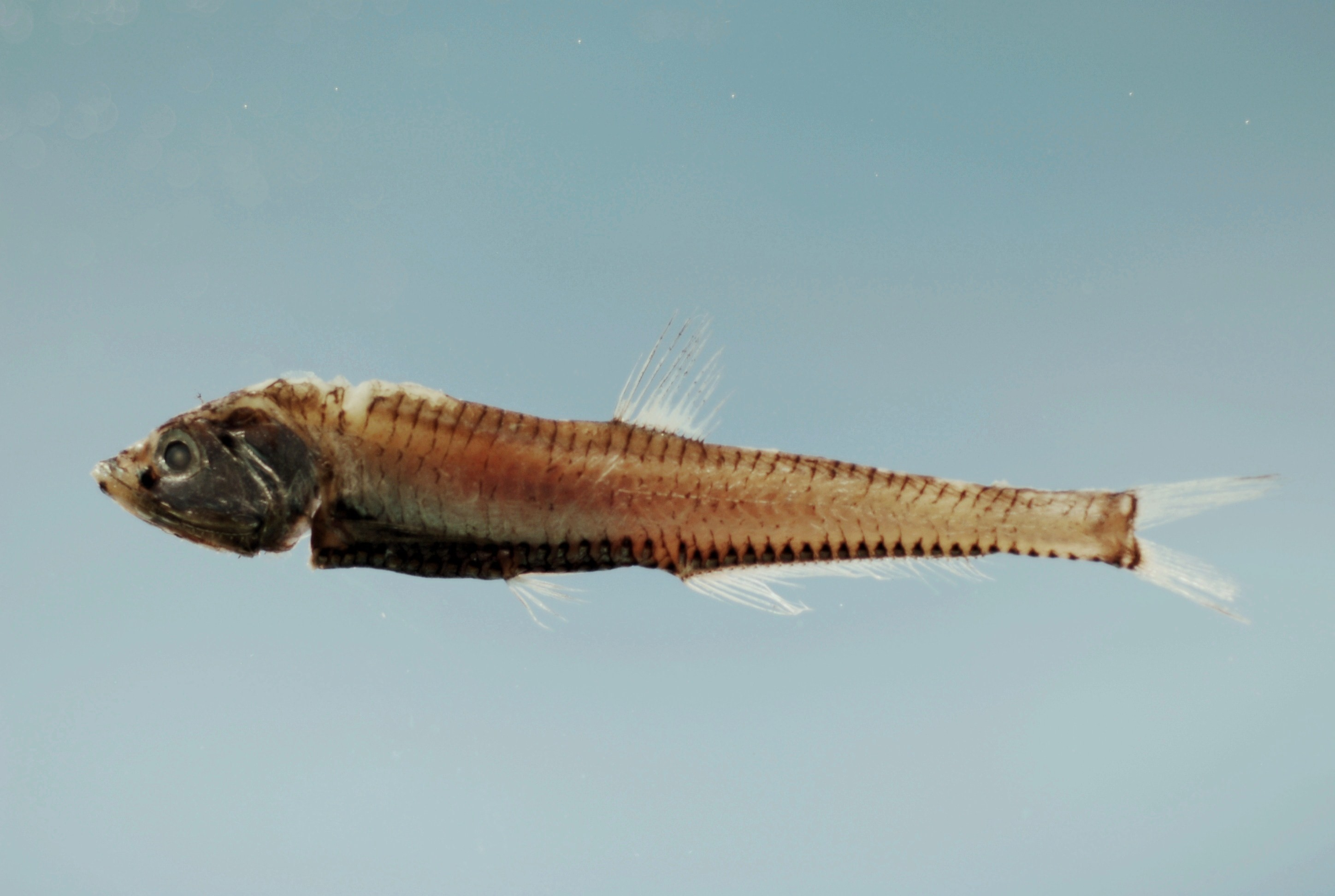

Scientific classification
- Domain: Eukaryota
- Kingdom: Animalia
- Phylum: Chordata
- Class: Actinopterygii
- Order: Stomiiformes
- Family: Phosichthyidae
- Genus: Pollichthys; M. G. Grey, 1959
- Species: P. mauli

Binomial name
- Pollichthys mauli (Poll, 1953)

Synonyms
- Yarrella mauli Poll, 1953

= Stareye lightfish =

Species of fish

The stareye lightfish (Pollichthys mauli) is a species in the monotypic genus of Pollichthys. They are small stomiiform fishes found in oceans throughout the world. The maximum length is 6 cm.

== Etymology ==
The genus is named after the Belgian ichthyologist Max Poll who described the species in 1953, originally placing it in the genus Yarrella. The species is named after Günther Maul.
