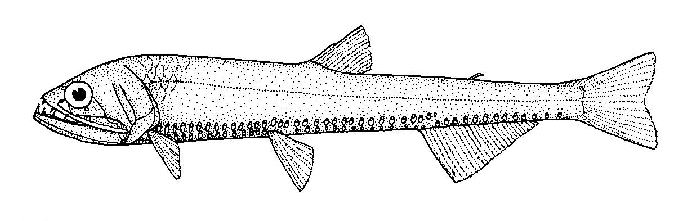
- Drawing by Dr Tony Ayling

Scientific classification
- Domain: Eukaryota
- Kingdom: Animalia
- Phylum: Chordata
- Class: Actinopterygii
- Order: Stomiiformes
- Family: Phosichthyidae
- Genus: Phosichthys; F. W. Hutton, 1872
- Species: P. argenteus

Binomial name
- Phosichthys argenteus F. W. Hutton, 1872

= Phosichthys =

Phosichthys argenteus

Genus of fishes

Phosichthys argenteus, the silver lightfish, a species of lightfish and the only member of the genus Phosichthys, is found in deep subtropical waters of all oceans, from depths of 500 to 2,000 m. Its length is between 10 and 30 cm. They are bioluminescent fishes, possessing rows of photophores along their sides, with which they hunt planktonic invertebrates, especially krill.
