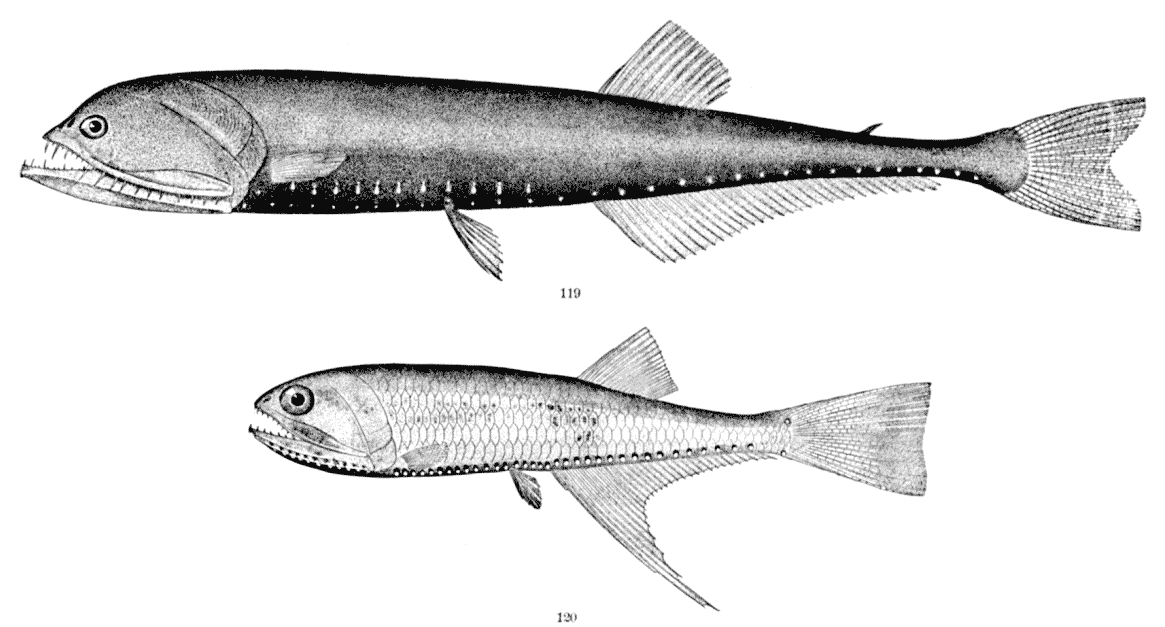
- Elongated bristlemouth, Gonostoma elongatum (top) and Bonapartia pedaliota (bottom)

Scientific classification
- Kingdom: Animalia
- Phylum: Chordata
- Class: Actinopterygii
- Division: Teleostei
- Order: Stomiiformes
- Suborder: Gonostomatoidei
- Family: Gonostomatidae; Cocco, 1838

Genera
- See text

= Gonostomatidae =

Bristlemouths Temporal range: Early Eocene–Recent

Family of fishes

The Gonostomatidae are a family of mesopelagic marine fish, commonly named bristlemouths or anglemouths. Their common name, bristlemouth, comes from their odd, equally sized, and bristle-like teeth. It is a relatively small family, containing only eight known genera and 32 species. However, bristlemouths make up for their lack of diversity with relative abundance, numbering in the hundreds of trillions to quadrillions. The genus Cyclothone (with 14 species) is thought to be one of the most abundant vertebrate genera in the world.

The fossil record of this family dates back to the Eocene epoch. Living bristlemouths were discovered by William Beebe in the early 1930s and described by L. S. Berg in 1958. These fish are mostly found in the Atlantic, Indian, and Pacific Oceans, although the species Cyclothone microdon may be found in Arctic waters. They have elongated bodies from 2 to 30 cm (0.79 to 11.81 in) in length. They have a number of green or red light-producing photophores aligned along the undersides of their heads or bodies. They are typically black in color which provides camouflage from predators in deep, dark waters. They mainly feed on zooplankton and small crustaceans due to their small size.

== Description ==
Bristlemouths are extremely small, measuring on average 7.5 centimetres (3.0 in). Bristlemouths have elongated bodies, small eyes, short snouts, large mouths, and large jaws. The position of the dorsal fin begins in line with the anal fin. The difference between bristlemouths species is found in the intensity of their pigmentation and photophore size. For the majority of the species, the morphology remains the same.

Bristlemouths are mostly dark in pigmentation but at times can display translucently. Bristlemouths contain a pineal organ which functions to detect slow changing ambient light. This allows the bristlemouth to have control over its circadian clock and seasonal behavior.

Bristlemouths are light emitting fish. Bristlemouths rely on their bioluminescence for different outcomes. Some rely on it to find prey while others use it to avoid predation. However, the most common way that their bioluminescence is used is as a mating signal between these fish, in the same way humans may "dance or wear bright colors at the nightclub." (To attract a partner).

Bristlemouths have large jaws that are capable of catching prey larger than themselves. The length of the Scopeloides glarisianus's (an extinct species of Bristlemouth) lower jaw is equal to 70% of the length of their head. The lower jaw of the Bristlemouths is not functional in terms of masticating their prey. It is therefore hypothesized that they swallow their prey tail first.

== Biology ==
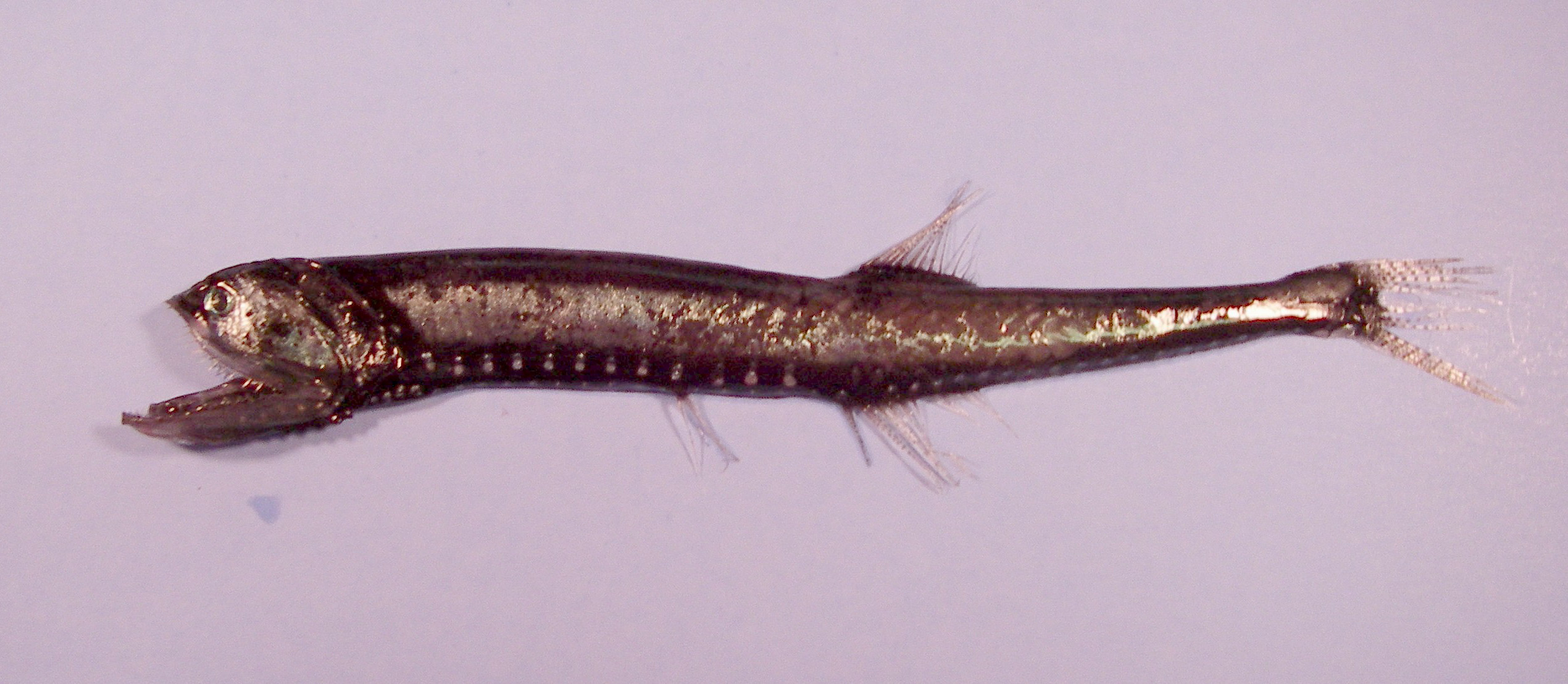
Bristlemouth specimen showing jaw length.

Bristlemouths feed mostly on zooplankton and small crustaceans. Their diet is composed of a range from 92 to 98% of Crustacea. A minor part of their diet is made up of opportunistic encounters with smaller fish. Bristlemouths that consume fish prey are found in individuals ranging from 70 mm to 75 mm. Bristlemouths do not have seasonal trends in their feeding habits.

Due to the small size of the fish, they are easy prey to dragonfish and fangtooths.

Bristlemouths are diel vertical migrators, therefore migrating closer to the surface waters in the nighttime in order to find more food. Out of the thirteen bristlemouth species, eight have been found near the surface therefore explaining their DVM behaviors.

Bristlemouths are able to efficiently capture their prey due to their bioluminescent nature.

Bristlemouths are protandrous, therefore a male-first hermaphrodite: they begin their lives as males and some of them switch to female. Male bristlemouths are smaller than females.

== Taxonomy ==
Some classifications include the genera Pollichthys and Vinciguerria, but this article follows FishBase in placing them in the family Phosichthyidae. In 2025, a phylogenetic study found the genera Diplophos and Manducus, previously included in the bristlemouths, to form a distinct early-diverging clade within the Stomiiformes, and thus moved them to their own family, the revived Diplophidae.

Some classifications include species in the genus Zaphotias, but these are junior synonyms of the species Bonapartia pedaliota.

Genus	Image	Species	Description
Bonapartia		1	There is only one described species in this genus. It grows to a length of 7.2 centimetres (2.8 in) SL.
Cyclothone		14	Typically about 3 inches long and found usually at depths exceeding 1000 feet. This genus is thought to be the most abundant vertebrate genus, with estimates of trillions to quadrillions of individual Cyclothone fish.
Gonostoma		3	Marine fish; bathypelagic; depth range 100 - 700 m.
Margrethia		2	
Sigmops		4	
Triplophos		1	There is only one described species in this genus. It grows to a length of 36 centimetres (14 in) SL.

=== Fossil genera ===
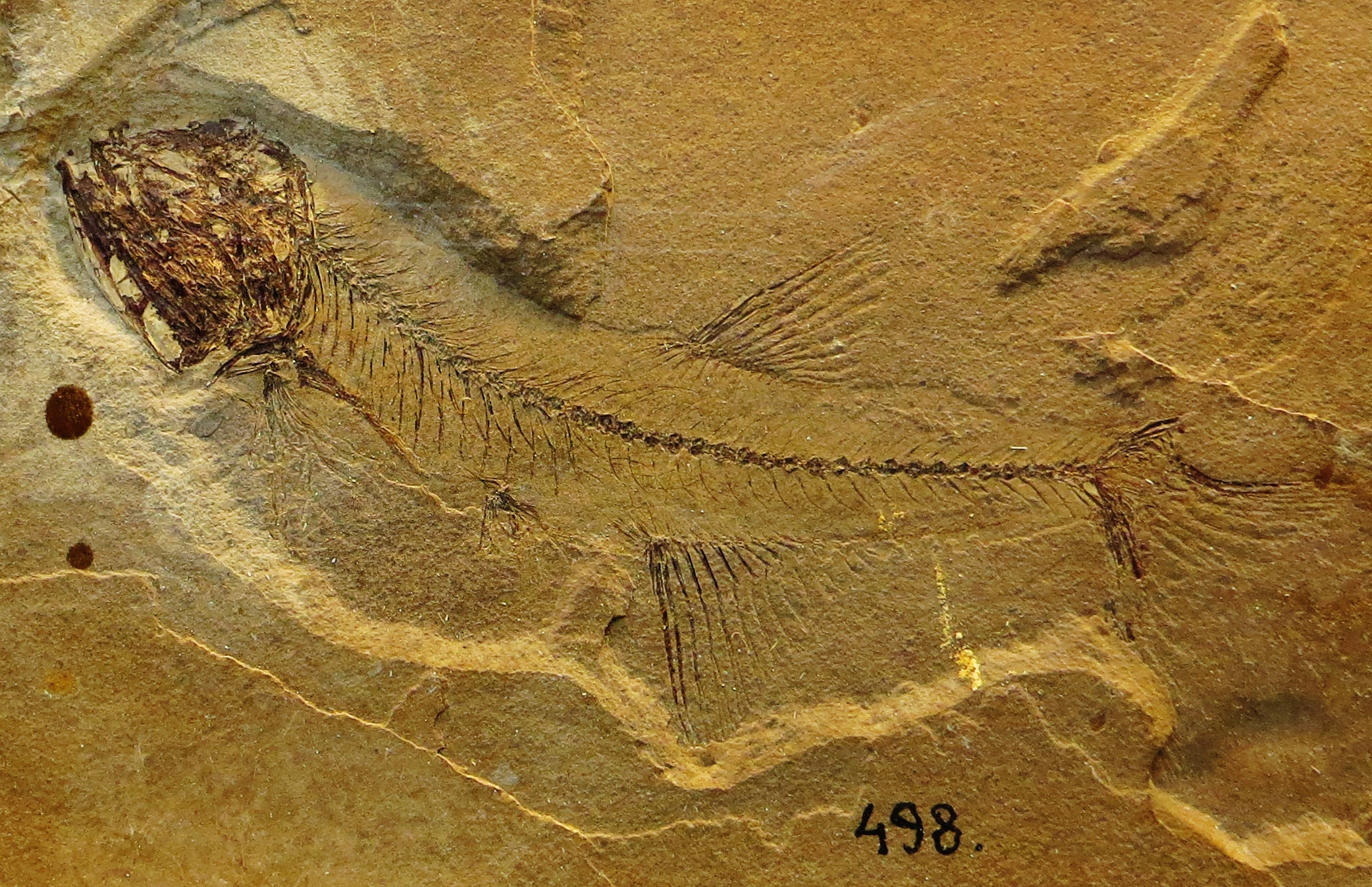
Scopeloides, a fossil bristlemouth from Romania

The following fossil bristlemouth genera are also known:

- †Primaevistomias Prokofiev & Bannikov, 2002 (Middle Eocene of the North Caucasus, Russia)
- †Kotlarczykia Jerzmańska, 1974 (Early Oligocene of Poland)
- †Scopeloides Wettstein, 1887 (Early Eocene to Early Oligocene of Italy, Switzerland, Poland, Romania, and the Czech Republic)
- †Ohuus Sato, 1962 (Miocene of Japan)
