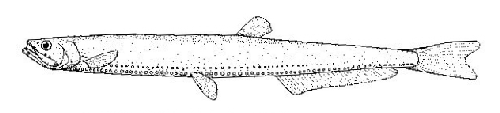
- Diplophos rebainsi

Scientific classification
- Kingdom: Animalia
- Phylum: Chordata
- Class: Actinopterygii
- Order: Stomiiformes
- Family: Diplophidae; Fowler, 1925

Genera
- Diplophos Günther, 1873; Manducus Goode & T. H. Bean, 1896

= Diplophidae =

Family of fishes

The Diplophidae or portholefishes are a family of mesopelagic marine stomiiform fish found in deep waters worldwide.

The following two genera are placed in this family:

- Diplophos Günther, 1873
- Manducus Goode & T. H. Bean, 1896

Previously, both genera were placed in the family Gonostomatidae. However, a 2025 phylogenetic study found this family to be paraphyletic as previously described, and found these genera to form a distinct early-diverging clade within the Stomiiformes, for which the old family name Diplophidae was revived.
