= Anastasio Cocco =

Italian naturalist (1799–1854)

Anastasio Cocco (29 August 1799, Messina – 26 February 1854, Messina) was an Italian medical doctor and naturalist who specialized in marine biology. He described several new fish and crustacea from the waters of Messina. The species Microichthys coccoi was named in his honour.

== Biography ==
Cocco was born in Messina where his father was a physician and writer. Cocco studied classics and went to the Collegio Carolinorese and then trained for medicine. He also learned botany and entomology from his brothers Gioacchino and Antonio Arrosto. He became interested in botany He went to Naples and attended lectures of Domenico Cotugno, Francesco Semmola, Vincenzo Lanza. He returned to Messina due to the death of his father and after his studies were interrupted he studied with Lorenzo Maisano before going back to Messina. He received a medical degree from the Siculorum Gymnasium, Catania. In 1827 he worked at the Carolina Academy as a chair of materia medica and in 1850 he became involved in pharmacology. He was especially interested in fish and described several taxa from the Straits of Messina. In 1852 his friend the German scientist Eduard Rüppell named a fish Microichthys coccoi to honor his name. He was a friend and correspondent of many other naturalists notably Charles Lucien Bonaparte, Antoine Risso and August David Krohn.

Cocco's writings on medicine included notes on lithotripsy, epidemics and curative mineral waters. Cocco described a number of fish species including Leptocephalus trichiurus, L. Gussoni, Lota joptera, Merlucius attenuatus, Merlangus pertusus, Tripterygion melanocephalus, Trachinus aureovittatus, Gymnocephalus messanensis, Bodianus peloritanus, Pomatomus Cuvieri, Scopelus Coccoi, Mychtophum metopoclampum, Gasteropelecus acanthurus, and Argiropelecus hemigymnus.

== Works ==
Partial list

- Cocco, A. 1829. Su di alcuni pesci de'mari di Messina. Giornale di Scienze, Lettere ed Arti per la Sicilia (Palermo) 7 26(77): 138–147 [146]. Contains the description of Argyropelecus hemigymnus Cocco, 1829 the Halfnaked Hatchetfish.
- Cocco, A. 1838. Su di alcuni Salmonidi del mare di Messina; lettera al Ch. D. Carle Luciano Bonaparte. Nuovi Annali delle Scienze Naturali. Bologna 1(2): 161–194 pls 5–8 [167, pl. 5(2)] Contains the description of Power's Deep-water Lightfish (Cocco, 1838).
- with Rüppell, E. 1844. Intorno ad alcuni cefalopodi del mare di Messina: lettera del Dr. Eduardo Rüppell di Frankfort sul Meno al Prof. Anastasio Cocco. Giornale del Gabinetto Letteràrio di Messina, 5(27-28):129-135, 2 figures.

== See also ==
- Category:Taxa named by Anastasio Cocco
