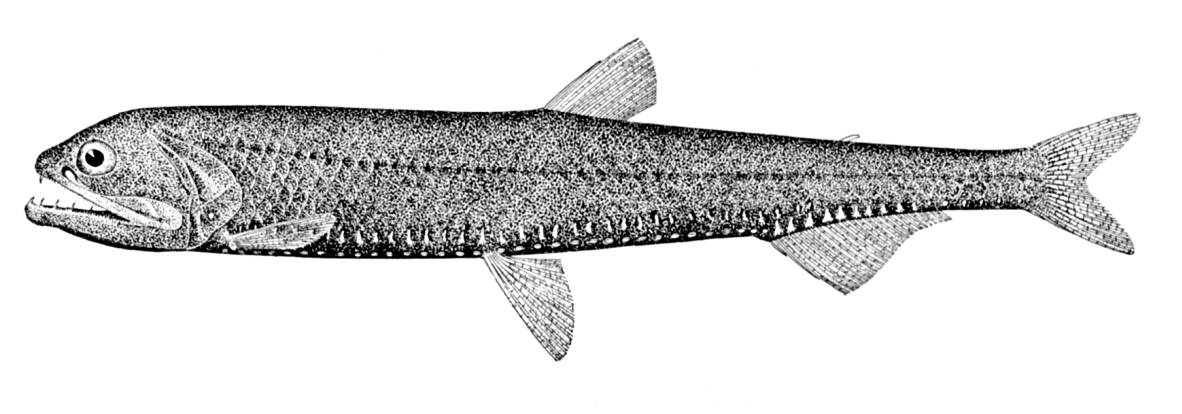
- Phosichthys argenteus

Scientific classification
- Kingdom: Animalia
- Phylum: Chordata
- Class: Actinopterygii
- Order: Stomiiformes
- Family: Phosichthyidae; Weitzman, 1974

Genera
- Phosichthys Hutton, 1872; Woodsia Grey, 1959

Synonyms
- Photichthyidae

= Phosichthyidae =

Lightfishes Temporal range: Early Eocene–present

Family of fishes

Lightfishes are small stomiiform fishes in the family Phosichthyidae They are bioluminescent fishes, possessing rows of photophores along their sides, with which they hunt planktonic invertebrates, especially krill, copepods, and planktonic amphipods.

In the past, a number of morphologically similar genera were classified in this family. However, a 2025 phylogenetic study found the latter family to be paraphyletic as previously described, comprising a number of distantly related genera from across the Stomiiformes. Due to this, the family was redefined as containing just three species in two genera.

The following genera are placed in this family:

- Phosichthys Hutton, 1872
- Woodsia Grey, 1959

The earliest fossils of lightfishes are of the genus †Solterichthys Calzoni, Giusberti & Carnevale, 2025 from the Early Eocene of Italy.

They are very small fishes found in oceans throughout the world: most species grow no longer than 10 cm.
