= Protosqualus =

Protosqualus Temporal range: Cretaceous, Barremian–Maastrichtian
- Drawing of a Protosqualus argentinensis tooth

Scientific classification
- Kingdom: Animalia
- Phylum: Chordata
- Class: Chondrichthyes
- Subclass: Elasmobranchii
- Division: Selachii
- Order: Squaliformes
- Family: Squalidae
- Genus: †Protosqualus; Cappetta, 1977

Type species
- †Protosqualus sigei Cappetta, 1977

Other species
- †Protosqualus albertsi Thies, 1981; †Protosqualus glickmani Averianov, 1997; †Protosqualus pachyrhiza Underwood & Mitchell, 1999; †Protosqualus barringtonensis Guinot et al., 2013; †Protosqualus argentinensis Bogan et al., 2016

Genus of dogfish shark

Protosqualus ("primitive Squalus") is an extinct genus of dogfish shark known from fossils found in Cretaceous rocks in Europe, Asia, Antarctica, Australia, and South America. The type species is Protosqualus sigei, which was found around an Albian-aged deposit in France. There are six species, which can be differentiated by distinct features in their teeth. Some species, such as P. barringtonensis, exhibit high levels of heterodonty. The oldest specimens are from the Speeton Clay Formation. Protosqualus teeth are quite common in the Grey Chalk deposit of England. The genus went extinct at the end of the Cretaceous during the Cretaceous–Paleogene extinction event, with the last species in the genus being Protosqualus argentinensis from southern Argentina as well as possibly being from earlier deposits in India.

== Discovery and maming ==
The type specimen of Protosqualus was found in a deposit that had been known to contain shark teeth since the 1930s. The type specimen was named in 1977 by paleontologist and ichthyologist, Henri Cappetta. The deposit is the Mortoniceras inflatum ammonoid zone. The name Protosqualus means "primitive Squalus" in reference to how it is an ancient genus related to the modern genus, Squalus. The name of the type species, P. sigei, honours paleontologist B. Siegé.

== Description ==
Protosqualus, like most fossil sharks, is known from mostly dental remains. Protosqualus has an undulated ventral margin of the dental crown that was distal to the apron. Unlike modern members of the genus Squalus, Protosqualus has dental crowns that lacked a high degree of labiolingual compression. The holotype of P. sigei features a tooth with small gaps between them, each with a clearly defined slanted tip. Its front ledge was well-developed and slightly raised, culminating in a rounded shape firmly attached at the base of the crown. The back of the tooth appeared flat, with a slight depression near the ledge. The root was low and thick, angled slightly in relation to the crown, and exhibited minor protrusions on both its front and rear sides. The bottom of the tooth was flat and gently curved, with the holes on the sides either separated or, less commonly, connected by a groove. The teeth of P. pachyrhiza were more bulky. Protosqualus glickmani had a broad cusp. Protosqualus argentinensis had defined serrated cutting edges and was probably the largest member of the genus. Protosqualus barringtonensis may have shown some sexual dimorphism in the teeth, however all teeth show a short cusp. P.albertsi had a broad, labial protuberance.

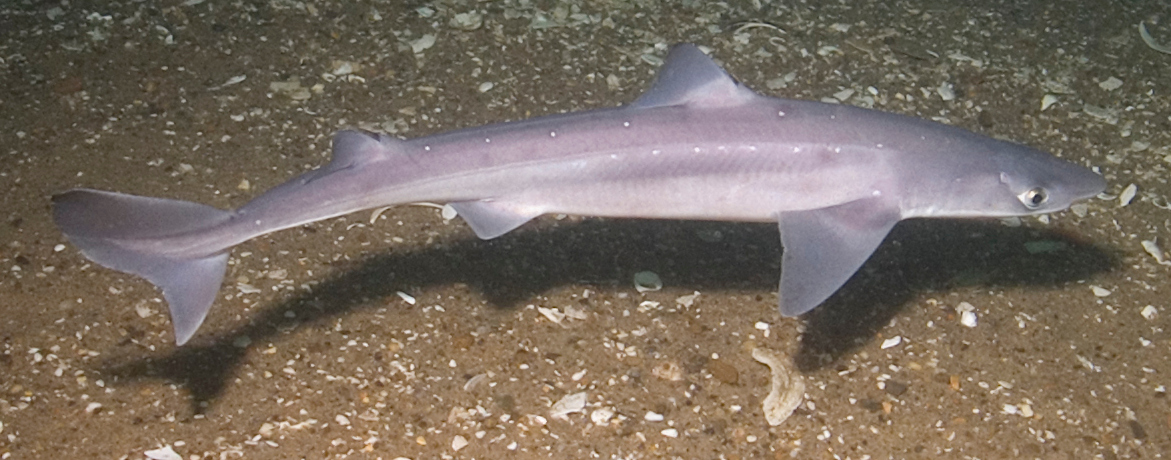
The extant spiny dogfish is one of the many modern relatives of Protosqualus

== Classification ==
Protosqualus is a member of the Squalidae within the Squaliformes order. Today, only two extant genera of squalids exist: Cirrhigaleus and Squalus. Squalids tend to have the teeth in their lower jaw not being any larger than the teeth seen in the upper jaw. Below is a cladogram showing the position of Squalidae within the Squaliform cladees.

- Squaliformes
  - Squalidae
  - - Centrophoridae
    - - Dalatiidae
      - - Etmopteridae
        - - Oxynotidae
          - Somniosidae

In 2001, Adnet & Cappetta found the following position for Protosqualus, recovered as the sister taxon to Squalus.

- - Echinorhinus
  - - - - - - - - - Etmopterus
                  - Eoetmopterus
                - - - - Dalatias
                      - Isistius
                    - - Euprotomicrus
                      - Squaliolus
                  - Euprotomicroides
              - Microetmopterus
            - Proetmopterus
          - Palaeomicroides
        - - - - - Centroscymnus
                - Scymnodon
              - Scymnodalatias
            - Oxynotus
          - - Somniosus
            - Cretascymnus
      - Centrophorus
      - Deania
    - - Squalus
      - Protosqualus
  - - - Protospinax
      - Pristiophorus
    - Squatina

== Paleoecology ==
Protosqualus lived alongside other chondrichthyans as well as other types of fish. It also lived alongside marine reptiles such as mosasaurs and plesiosaurs in the Cretaceous oceans. Fossils of Protosqualus have been found in the Speeton Clay Formation, Omagari Formation, Hunstanton Formation, Jiesia Formation, López de Bertodano Formation, Burim Formation, Ferriby Formation, Karai Formation, Labguva Formation, Hibernian Greensand Formation, and Calafate Formation, among a few others. The Calafate Formation likely had estuaries and shallow seas.
