= Pocket shark =

Conservation status
- Least Concern (IUCN 3.1)

Scientific classification
- Kingdom: Animalia
- Phylum: Chordata
- Class: Chondrichthyes
- Subclass: Elasmobranchii
- Division: Selachii
- Order: Squaliformes
- Family: Dalatiidae
- Genus: Mollisquama
- Species: M. parini

Binomial name
- Mollisquama parini Dolganov, 1984
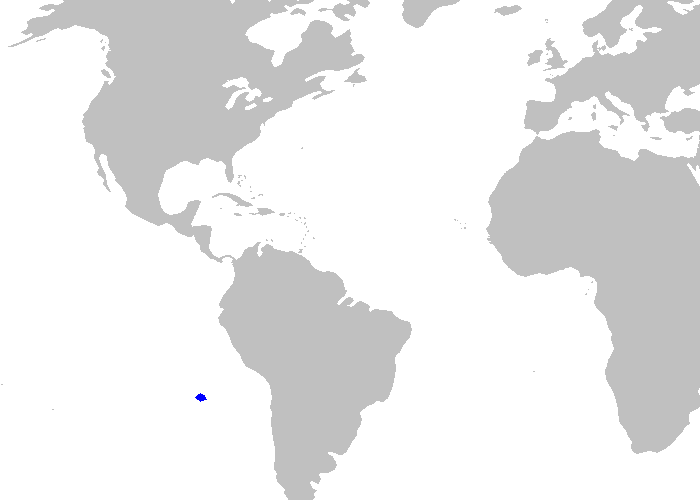
- Geographic range of pocket shark (Mollisquama parini ) in blue

Species of shark

The pocket shark (Mollisquama parini) is a species of kitefin shark in the family Dalatiidae. The species is found in deep water off Chile in the southeastern Pacific Ocean. It was the only member of the genus Mollisquama, until another species, M. mississippiensis, was discovered in the Gulf of Mexico. Both species are distinguished from other sharks by two pockets next to the front fins. The pockets are large, measuring about 4% of the shark's body length. Some researchers hypothesize that the pockets may excrete some kind of glowing fluid or pheromones.

== Etymology ==
The specific name, parini, is in honor of Russian ichthyologist Nikolai Vasilyevich Parin (born 1932).

== Distribution and habitat ==
The first specimen of M. parini was found off the coast of Chile in the Nazca Submarine Ridge. This specimen was an adolescent female with a total length of 40 cm (16 in), taken at a depth of 330 m (1,080 ft), in 1979. This initially suggested that the species was distributed throughout the Pacific Ocean. In February 2010, a similar specimen with a total length of 14 cm (5.5 in) was caught 305 km (190 mi) off the coast of Louisiana, in the Gulf of Mexico. This second specimen was determined to be a new species which was described and named as M. mississippiensis. It is now believed that the genus Mollisquama is more widely dispersed than previously hypothesized.

== Description ==
Sharks of the family Dalatiidae are small-sized to medium-sized, with two spineless dorsal fins. They are described as having strong jaws with dagger-like upper teeth and wider blade-like teeth in the lower jaw. From the one finding of the pocket shark in the Gulf of Mexico (M. mississippiensis), the mouth was described to have a rectangular-like opening on the underside of the body. The juvenile male shark found in the Gulf of Mexico weighed 14.6 g (0.51 oz) and had a total length of 142 mm (5.6 in). The overall shape of the shark is cylindrical, with a wide, rounded snout tapering back toward the caudal fin.

== Pocket gland ==
The pocket shark, Mollisquama parini, gets its common name from a small pocket gland that is found behind each pectoral fin on either side of the shark. The purpose of this gland is still unknown as not enough specimens have been found to investigate the matter. The closest suggestion for the purpose of this gland is to act as a luminous pouch as found on the species Euprotomicroides zantedeschia. While this pocket gland appears to have a slightly darker gray coloration, the rest of the shark's body is described to be a light gray with brown undertones. The pocket is located approximately 2.5 mm (0.098 in) from the base of the pectoral fin and was measured to be 13.0 mm (0.51 in) long and 5.0 mm (0.20 in) wide.

== Environmental threats and conservation ==
There is essentially no interaction of M. parini with humans, so the species does not seem to cause any threat to the environment and other species, including humans. No methods of conservation are in place to protect this species as population numbers are unknown.
