= Largetooth cookiecutter shark =

Conservation status
- Least Concern (IUCN 3.1)

Scientific classification
- Kingdom: Animalia
- Phylum: Chordata
- Class: Chondrichthyes
- Subclass: Elasmobranchii
- Division: Selachii
- Order: Squaliformes
- Family: Dalatiidae
- Genus: Isistius
- Species: I. plutodus

Binomial name
- Isistius plutodus Garrick & Springer, 1964
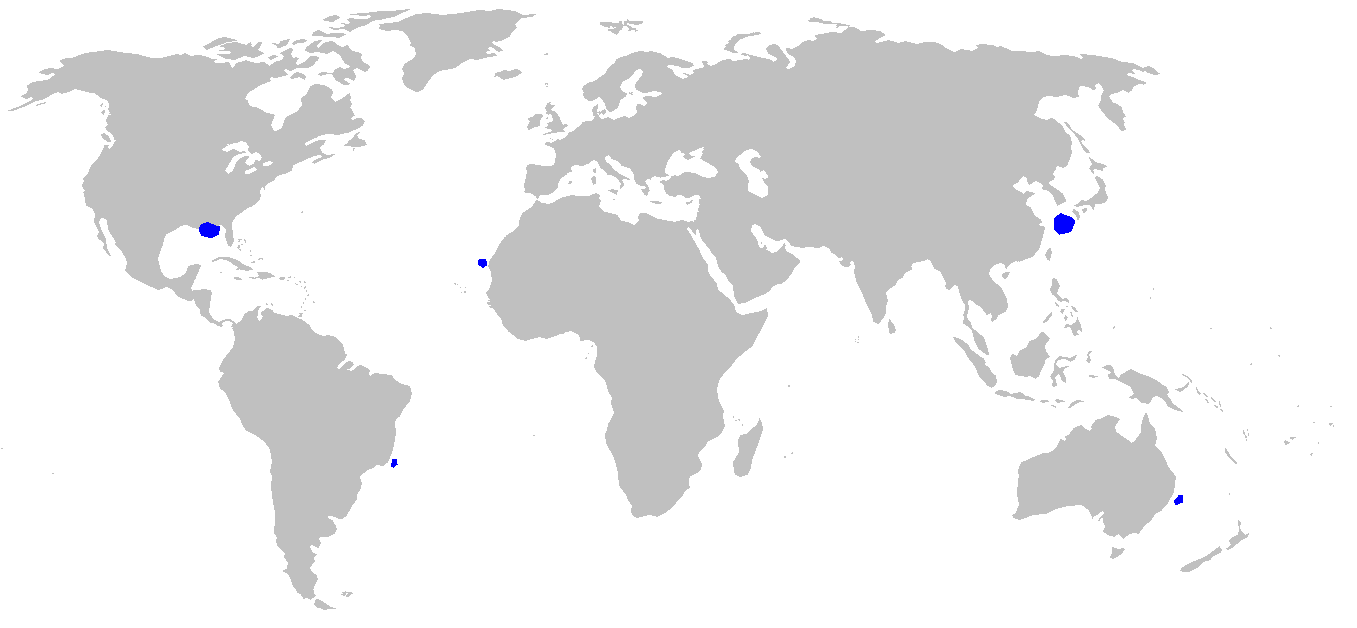
- Range of the largetooth cookiecutter shark

Species of shark

The largetooth cookiecutter shark (Isistius plutodus) is a rare species of squaliform shark in the family Dalatiidae, reported from depths of 60–200 m (200–660 ft) at scattered locations in the Atlantic and Pacific Oceans. As its common name suggests, it is similar in appearance to the cookiecutter shark (I. brasiliensis) but has much larger lower teeth. This species reaches a maximum known length of 42 cm (17 in). The largetooth cookiecutter shark feeds by gouging out chunks of flesh from larger animals, including bony fishes, sharks, and marine mammals such as whales, dolphins, seals and killer whales and is able to take larger bites than I. brasiliensis. Little is known of its life history; it is thought to be a weaker swimmer than I. brasiliensis, and is presumably aplacental viviparous like the rest of its family. This shark is an infrequent bycatch of commercial trawl and longline fisheries, but is not thought to be much threatened by these activities.

== Taxonomy ==
The largetooth cookiecutter shark was originally described by Jack Garrick and Stewart Springer, in a 1964 issue of the scientific journal Copeia. Their description was based on a 42 cm (17 in) long adult female caught in a midwater trawl in the Gulf of Mexico, some 160 km (100 mi) south of Dauphin Island, Alabama. The specific epithet plutodus is derived from the Greek ploutos ("wealth" or "abundance") and odous ("tooth"). This species may also be referred to as the bigtooth or longtooth cookiecutter shark, or the Gulf dogfish.

== Distribution and habitat ==
Much rarer than I. brasiliensis, only ten specimens of largetooth cookiecutter shark are known, caught from a handful of widely scattered localities: off Alabama in the United States, Bahia in Brazil, the Azores, and Western Sahara in the Atlantic Ocean, and off Okinawa and New South Wales in the Pacific. Those captures were made in the epipelagic zone 60–200 m (200–660 ft) down, close to land over continental shelves, continental slopes, or oceanic trenches that may descend as far as 6.44 km (4.00 mi). The shark's rarity may be due to a restricted distribution or, more likely, it normally preferring deeper waters.

== Description ==
The largetooth cookiecutter shark has a long, cigar-shaped body with an extremely short, blunt head and snout. The large, oval eyes are positioned to allow binocular vision, and are followed by wide, angled spiracles. The nostrils are small, each with a low, pointed skin lobe in front. The mouth is transverse, with a deep fold enclosing its corners and fleshy suctorial lips. The jaws are larger and more powerful than those of I. brasiliensis, and contain fewer tooth rows, numbering around 29 in the upper jaw and 19 in the lower jaw. The upper teeth are small, narrow, and smooth-edged, upright at the center of the jaw and becoming more angled towards the corners. The lower teeth are massive, the largest teeth relative to body size of any living shark. They are triangular in shape, with minutely serrated edges and interlocking rectangular bases. The five pairs of gill slits are minute.

The small dorsal fins have rounded apices and are placed far back, on the last third of the body. The first dorsal fin originates slightly ahead of the pelvic fins, while the second dorsal originates closely behind and measures almost a third again the height of the first. The pectoral fins are small and rounded, and positioned relatively high on the body behind the fifth gill slit. The pelvic fins are tiny, and there is no anal fin. The caudal fin is very short, with the upper lobe twice as long as the lower and bearing a prominent ventral notch near the tip. The coloration is a plain dark brown, with translucent margins on the fins and sparsely scattered light-emitting photophores on the belly. Some specimens have lacked the dark "collar" found on the throat of I. brasiliensis. However, a specimen caught in 2004 off the Azores did possess the collar, and other freshly caught specimens also possess this trait, suggesting that the lack of a collar is an artifact of preservation. The maximum recorded length is 42 cm (17 in).

== Biology and ecology ==
Based on its smaller dorsal and caudal fins, the largetooth cookiecutter shark is believed to be less active than I. brasiliensis and an overall weak swimmer. Much of its body cavity is occupied by an enormous oil-filled liver, which allows it to maintain neutral buoyancy in the water column with little effort. Unlike I. brasiliensis, this shark possesses binocular vision, which may allow it to target its prey with greater precision. Virtually nothing is known of its biology; it is presumed to be aplacental viviparous.

Like I. brasiliensis, the largetooth cookiecutter shark is an ectoparasite that feeds by excising plugs of flesh from larger animals. While I. brasiliensis is theorized to latch onto the surface of its prey and bite with a twisting motion, producing a circular wound containing spiral grooves inside from its lower teeth, the largetooth cookiecutter shark seems to employ a "sweeping" bite that produces a larger, more elongate (twice as long as the width of the mouth), oval wound containing parallel tooth grooves. This shark has been known to bite bony fishes, sharks, and marine mammals. One study has found that the largetooth cookiecutter shark is responsible for 80% of the cookiecutter wounds found on cetaceans off Bahia, Brazil. The flank was the most often-attacked area, followed by the head and abdomen. In at least three cases, bites to dolphins appeared to have resulted in their subsequent deaths by stranding. Another prey species in the area is the subantarctic fur seal (Arctocephalus tropicalis); at least two cases of juveniles fatally stranding after being bitten have also been recorded.

== Human interactions ==
Other than possibly damaging billfishes or other valued species, the largetooth cookiecutter shark is of no import to commercial fisheries. All but one of the known specimens have been caught as bycatch in commercial trawls or longlines. However, given the infrequency of these catches and this species' probable wide distribution, the International Union for Conservation of Nature (IUCN) has assessed it as of Least Concern.
