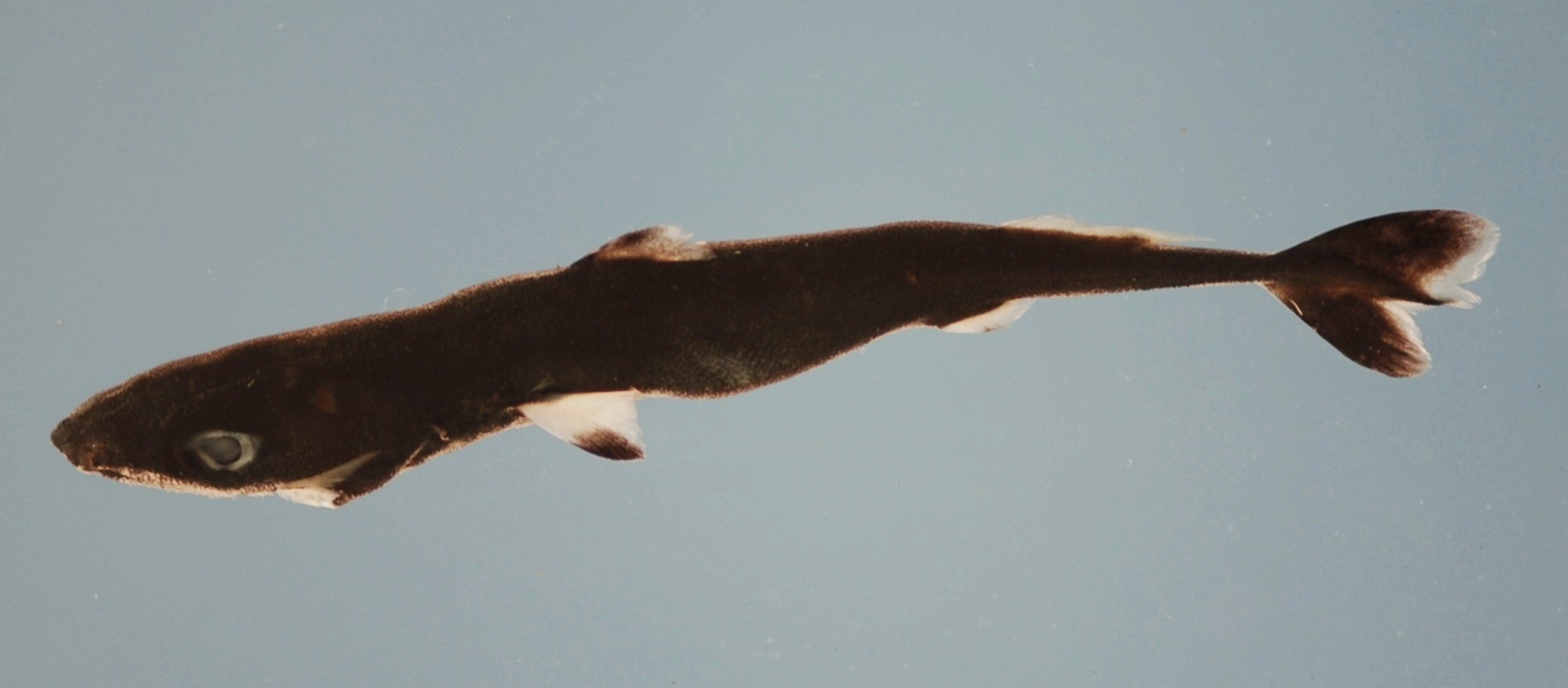

Conservation status
- Least Concern (IUCN 3.1)

Scientific classification
- Kingdom: Animalia
- Phylum: Chordata
- Class: Chondrichthyes
- Subclass: Elasmobranchii
- Division: Selachii
- Order: Squaliformes
- Family: Dalatiidae
- Genus: Squaliolus
- Species: S. laticaudus

Binomial name
- Squaliolus laticaudus H. M. Smith and Radcliffe, 1912
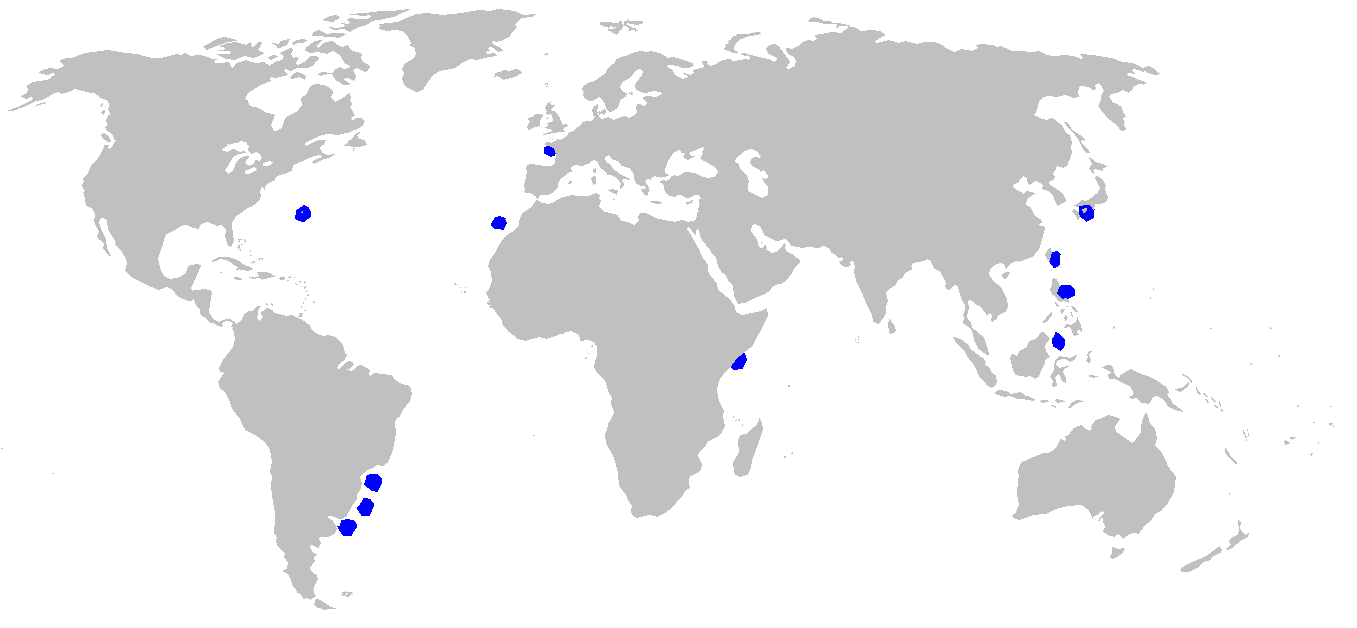
- Range of the spined pygmy shark

Synonyms
- Squaliolus sarmenti Noronha, 1926

= Spined pygmy shark =

Species of shark

The spined pygmy shark (Squaliolus laticaudus) is a species of squaliform shark in the family Dalatiidae found widely in all oceans. Growing no larger than roughly 28 cm (11 in), it is one of the smallest sharks alive, with this record beaten by the dwarf lanternshark. This shark has a slender, cigar-shaped body with a sizable conical snout, a long but low second dorsal fin, and an almost symmetrical caudal fin. Its sister species S. aliae and it are the only sharks with a spine on the first dorsal fin and not the second. Spined pygmy sharks are dark brown to black, with numerous bioluminescent organs called photophores on their ventral surface. The shark is believed to use these photophores to match ambient light conditions, which break up its silhouette and help the shark to avoid being seen by predators below.

Usually inhabiting nutrient-rich waters over upper continental and insular slopes, the spined pygmy shark feeds on small bony fishes and squid. Like its prey, it is a diel vertical migrator, spending the day at close to 500 m (1,600 ft) deep and moving towards a depth of 200 m (660 ft) at night. Reproduction is presumably aplacental viviparous, with females giving birth to litters of up to four pups. This diminutive shark has no economic value. The International Union for Conservation of Nature has assessed this species as of Least Concern, as it faces little threat from commercial fisheries and has a wide distribution.

== Taxonomy and phylogeny ==
The spined pygmy shark was one of many new species discovered during the course of the 1907–1910 Philippine Expedition of the U.S. Fish Commission Steamer Albatross. It was described by American ichthyologists Hugh McCormick Smith and Lewis Radcliffe in a 1912 paper for the scientific journal Proceedings of the United States National Museum, based on two specimens collected in Batangas Bay, south of Luzon in the Philippines. One of these, a 15-cm-long adult male, was designated the type specimen.

Smith and Radcliffe coined the new genus Squaliolus for this shark, and gave it the specific epithet laticaudus, from the Latin latus meaning "broad" or "wide", and cauda meaning "tail". The spined pygmy shark may also be referred to as the dwarf shark or the bigeye dwarf shark. Based on similarities in their claspers (male intromittent organs), the closest relative of the spined pygmy shark and the related S. aliae is thought to be the pygmy shark (Euprotomicrus bispinatus).

== Distribution and habitat ==
The spined pygmy shark has a wide distribution around the world. In the Atlantic Ocean, it occurs off Bermuda, the United States, Suriname, southern Brazil, and northern Argentina in the west, and off northern France, Madeira, Cape Verde, and the Azores in the east. In the Indian Ocean, this species has only been recorded off Somalia. In the Pacific Ocean, it is found off southern Japan, Taiwan, and the Philippines. The spined pygmy shark is found at depths of 200–500 m (660–1,640 ft) and seldom approaches the surface, unlike the related pygmy shark and cookiecutter shark (Isistius brasiliensis). This shark prefers areas of high biological productivity over upper continental and insular slopes. It may also be found over outer shelves, but avoids central ocean basins. The range of this species does not overlap that of the pygmy shark, which has a similar ecology, and is also largely separate from that of the cookiecutter shark.

== Description ==
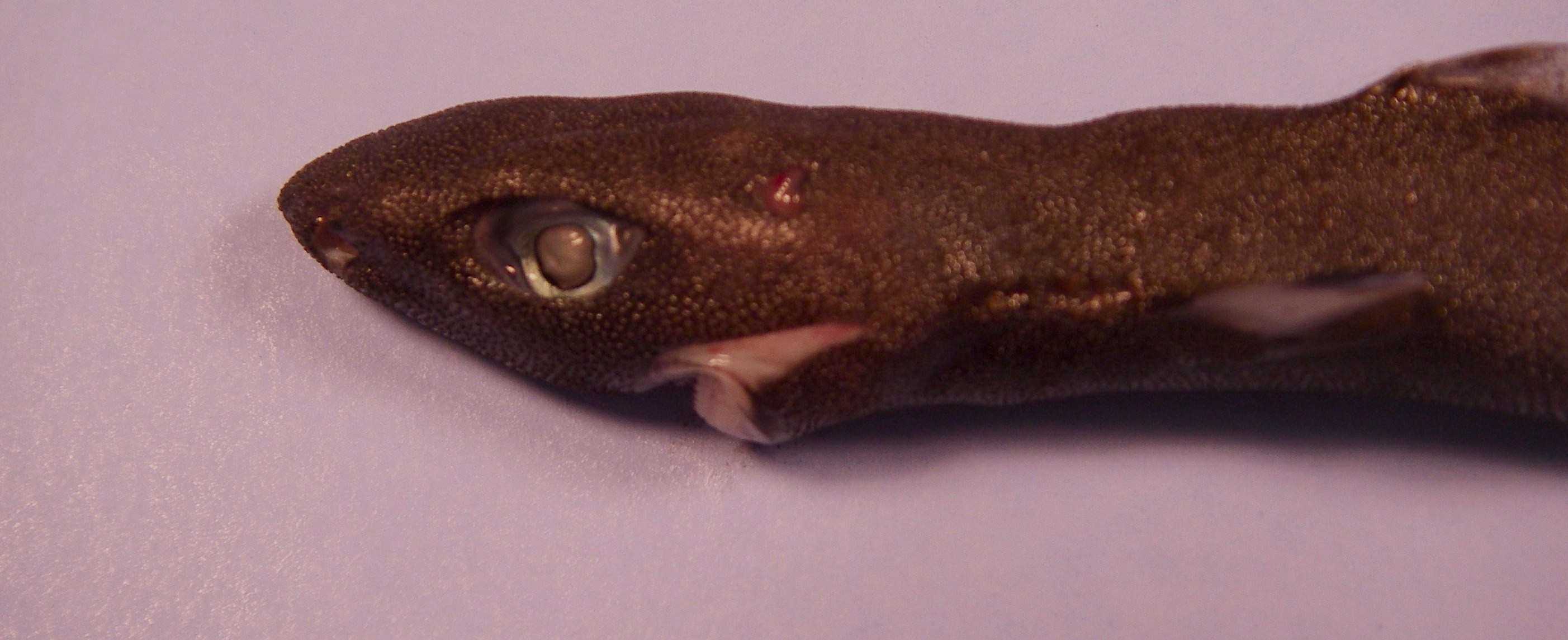

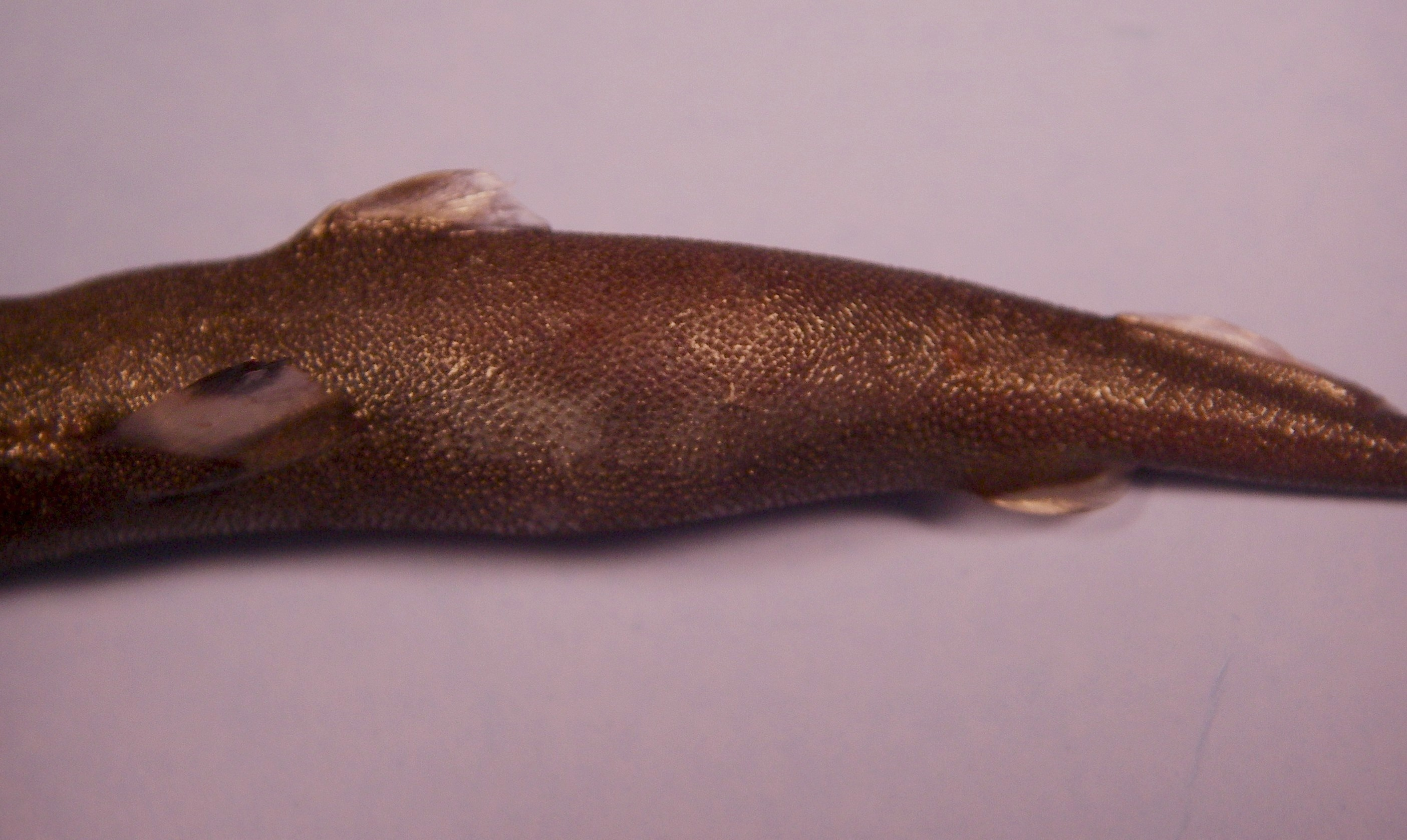
The spined pygmy shark has a long snout, large eyes, and a spine on the first dorsal fin but not the second.

One of the world's smallest sharks, the spined pygmy shark attains a maximum recorded length of 22 cm (8.7 in) for males and 28 cm (11 in) for females. This species has an elongated, spindle-shaped body with a long, bulbous, moderately pointed snout. The eyes are large, with the upper rim of the orbit almost straight. Each nostril is preceded by a short flap of skin. The mouth has thin, smooth lips and contains 22–31 tooth rows in the upper jaw and 16–21 tooth rows in the lower jaw. The upper teeth are narrow and smooth-edged with single upright cusps. The bases of the lower teeth are broad and interlocked to form a continuous cutting surface, with each tooth bearing a single upright, smooth-edged, knife-like cusp. The openings of the five pairs of gill slits are minute and uniform in size.

The two species of Squaliolus are the only sharks with a spine on the first dorsal fin but not the second. The spine is sexually dimorphic, being typically exposed in males and enclosed by skin in females. The first dorsal fin is tiny and originates over the trailing margin of the pectoral fins. The second dorsal fin is low, with a base twice as long as that of the first, and originates over the anterior half of the pelvic fin bases. The pectoral fins are short and triangular, with the rear margin slightly curved. The pelvic fins are long and low, and there is no anal fin. The caudal peduncle is slender and laterally expanded into weak keels. The caudal fin is broad and paddle-like, with the upper and lower lobes of similar size and shape, and a deep notch in the trailing margin of the upper lobe.

The dermal denticles are flat and blocky, not elevated on stalks or bearing marginal teeth. The coloration is dark brown to black, with light fin margins. The underside is densely carpeted by light-emitting photophores, which extend to the tip of the snout and around the eyes and nostrils, and thin to almost non-existent on the back. This species has on average only 60 vertebrae, the fewest of any shark.

== Biology and ecology ==
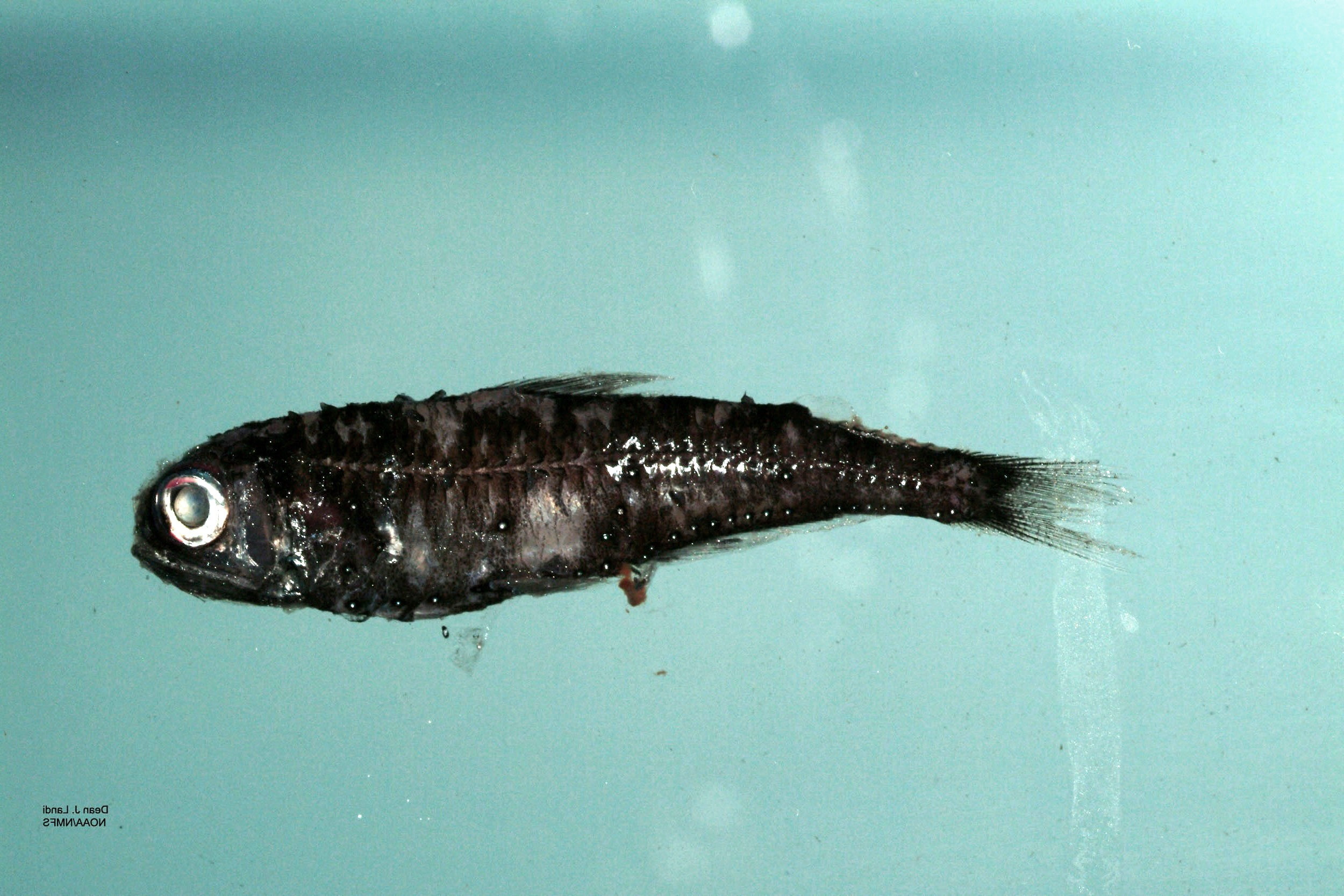
Lanternfish are preyed upon by the spined pygmy shark.

The diet of the spined pygmy shark consists mainly of bony fishes (including the dragonfish Idiacanthus, the lanternfish Diaphus, and the bristlemouth Gonostoma) and squid (including members of the genera Chiroteuthis and Histioteuthis). Catch records suggest that the spined pygmy shark follows its prey on their diel vertical migrations, spending the day close to a depth of 500 m (1,600 ft) and ascending towards a depth of 200 m (660 ft) at night. The ventral photophores of the spined pygmy shark have been theorized to function in counter-illumination, a form of camouflage in which the shark disguises its silhouette from would-be predators by matching the ambient light welling down from above. There is no evidence that this shark swallows its shed teeth like the pygmy and cookiecutter sharks.

The spined pygmy shark is aplacental viviparous like the rest of its family, with the developing embryos being sustained by a yolk sac until birth. Adult females have two functional ovaries that may each contain up to 12 mature eggs. However, the actual litter size is much smaller; a pregnant female caught off southern Brazil in 1999 contained four near-term pups. The young are born at 9–10 cm (3.5–3.9 in) long. Males mature sexually at a length of 15 cm (5.9 in), and females at a length of 17–20 cm (6.7–7.9 in). The spined pygmy shark was widely considered to be the smallest living shark species until the discovery of the dwarf lanternshark (Etmopterus perryi), though the pygmy ribbontail catshark (Eridacnis radcliffei) is also known to mature at a size comparable to these two species. Whether one of these sharks is definitively smaller than the others cannot yet be stated with certainty, because of the difficulties involved in assessing reproductive maturity in sharks.

== Human interactions ==
Spined pygmy sharks have no commercial value; they sometimes appear in the bycatch of trawl fisheries, but are generally too small to be captured. In light of its wide distribution and the absence of substantial threats from human activity, the International Union for Conservation of Nature (IUCN) has assessed this species as of Least Concern.
