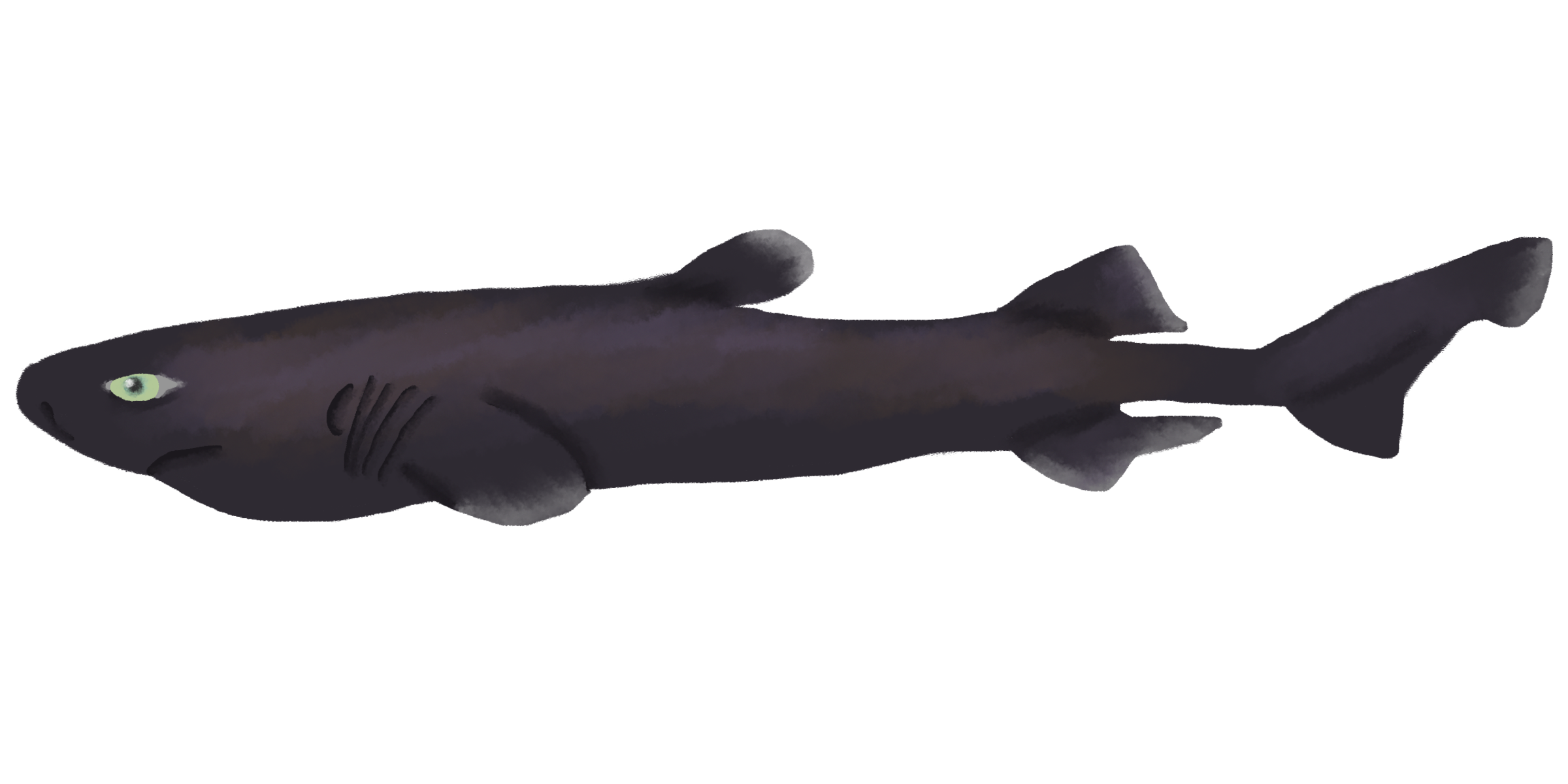

Conservation status
- Least Concern (IUCN 3.1)

Scientific classification
- Kingdom: Animalia
- Phylum: Chordata
- Class: Chondrichthyes
- Subclass: Elasmobranchii
- Division: Selachii
- Order: Squaliformes
- Family: Dalatiidae
- Genus: Euprotomicroides; Hulley & M. J. Penrith, 1966
- Species: E. zantedeschia

Binomial name
- Euprotomicroides zantedeschia Hulley & M. J. Penrith, 1966
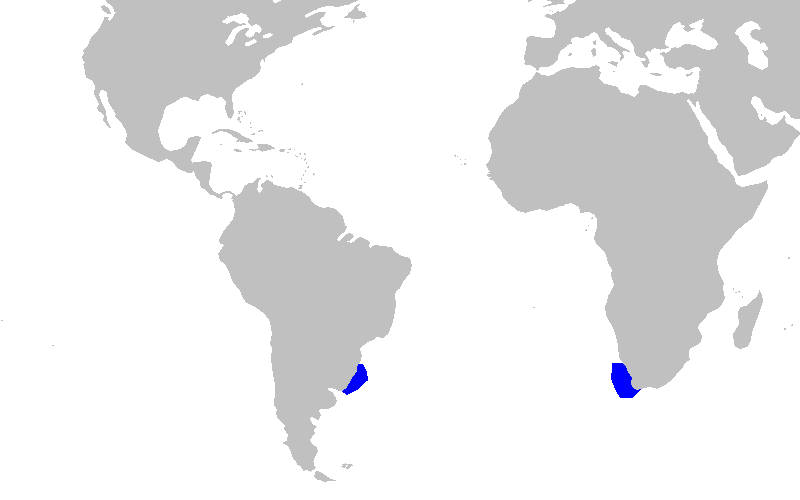
- Occurrences of the taillight shark

= Taillight shark =

Species of shark

The taillight shark (Euprotomicroides zantedeschia) is a little-known species of shark in the family Dalatiidae and the only member of its genus. It is known from only four specimens collected from deep oceanic waters in the southern Atlantic Ocean and Pacific Ocean. A small shark with a laterally compressed body and a bulbous snout, this species has unusual adaptations that indicate a specialized lifestyle: its pectoral fins are paddle-like and may be used for propulsion, unlike other sharks and it has a pouch-like gland on its abdomen that emits clouds of luminescent blue fluid. This shark is likely aplacental viviparous and a formidable predator for its size.

== Taxonomy and phylogeny ==
The first specimen of the taillight shark was collected by the Cape Town trawler Arum in 1963 and was initially identified as a longnose pygmy shark before being recognized as a hitherto unknown species. The genus name Euprotomicroides comes from this shark's resemblance to the pygmy shark.

Phylogenetic analysis based on dentition indicates that the taillight shark is the most basal member of its family and is sister to the clade containing all other dalatiid species. Although no definitive fossil remains have been found, the taillight shark may have evolved in the early Paleocene epoch (65.5–55.8 million years ago – Mya), as part of a larger adaptive radiation of dogfish sharks into midwater habitats. The teeth of the extinct shark Paraphorosoides ursulae, found in early Campanian (83.5–70.6 Mya) deposits in Germany, closely resemble those of the taillight shark.

== Etymology ==
The specific epithet zantedeschia is derived from Zantedeschia aethiopica, a species of arum lily for which the trawler Arum was named.

== Distribution and habitat ==
The four specimens of the taillight shark were caught off South Africa in a trawl operating at a depth of 458–641 m (1,503–2,103 ft), off Uruguay in a trawl operating at a depth of 195–205 m (640–673 ft) and off Chile, near Juan Fernández Islands. These records suggest this shark is an inhabitant of the open ocean. However, whether the known specimens were captured near the sea bottom where the trawls operated or from midwater as the nets were being retrieved is unclear.

== Description ==
The taillight shark is laterally compressed, with a long rounded snout and large oval eyes. The mouth is large, containing 29 tooth rows in the upper jaw and 34 tooth rows in the lower jaw. The upper teeth are small and needle-like, while the lower teeth are large and triangular, with their bases interlocking to form a continuous cutting surface. The lips are thick and fringed, though not modified to be suctorial. The five pairs of gill slits are large and increase in size from the first to the last.

The two dorsal fins are rounded and lack spines; the first is smaller than the second and located about halfway between the pectoral and pelvic fins. The pectoral fins are enlarged into rounded paddles. The pelvic fins are small and originate at the level of the second dorsal fin; the anal fin is absent. The caudal fin has a strong lower lobe and a long upper lobe with a prominent notch near the tip. The body is covered by small, non-overlapping dermal denticles; each denticle has radial ridges converging to a round central pit. The body is dark brown above and black below, with light margins on the fins. Small, light-emitting photophores are scattered over the body. The first specimen was an immature female (originally reported incorrectly as a mature male) 17.6 cm (6.9 in) long, the second was a mature male 41.6 cm (16.4 in) long, the third was also a mature male 45.5 cm (17.9 in) long and the fourth specimen was a mature female 51.5 cm (20.3 in).

== Biology and ecology ==
The muscular, lobe-like pectoral fins of the taillight shark suggest they may be used for propulsion, in a manner more akin to that of chimaeras than other sharks or at least for hovering in the water column. Its strongly built jaws and teeth likely allow it to tackle relatively large prey. On the belly in front of the cloaca is a pouch-like groove devoid of denticles and lined with a luminescent tissue formed into numerous, tightly packed papillae (nipple-like structures). The entrance to the pouch is a slit lined with folds of skin. In life, the pouch emits a glowing blue fluid of unknown function. Reproduction is presumably aplacental viviparous as in the other members of its family.

== Human interactions ==
The taillight shark is not caught significantly by any fishery, possibly due to its small size and habitat preferences. The International Union for Conservation of Nature has assessed its conservation status as least concern.
