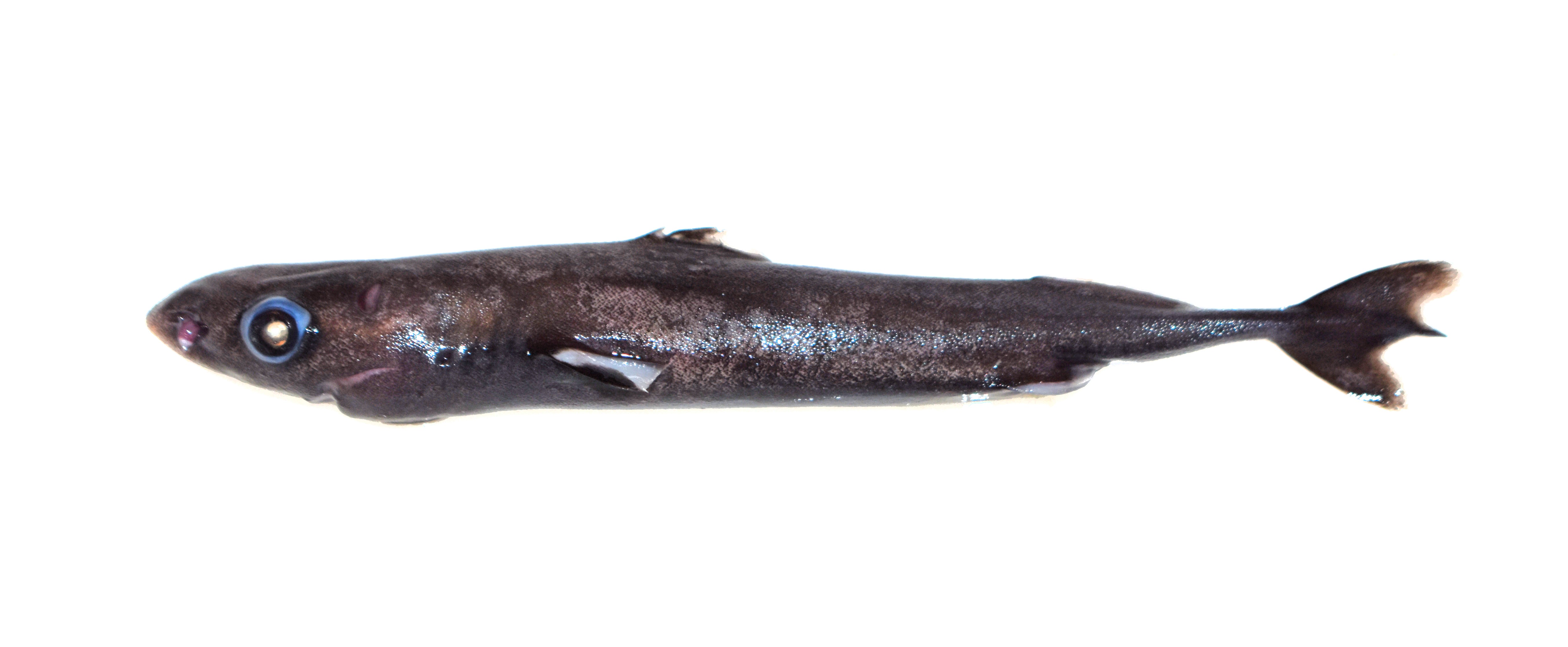

Conservation status
- Least Concern (IUCN 3.1)

Scientific classification
- Kingdom: Animalia
- Phylum: Chordata
- Class: Chondrichthyes
- Subclass: Elasmobranchii
- Division: Selachii
- Order: Squaliformes
- Family: Dalatiidae
- Genus: Squaliolus
- Species: S. aliae

Binomial name
- Squaliolus aliae Teng, 1959
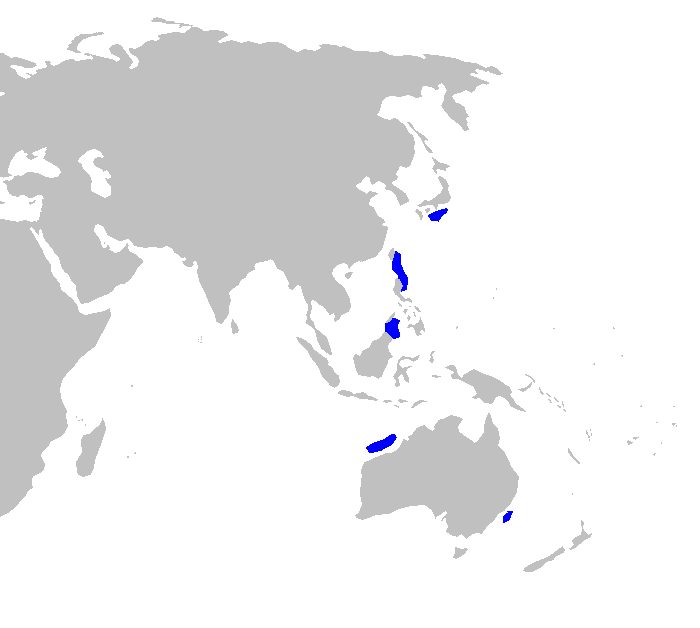
- Range of smalleye pygmy shark

= Smalleye pygmy shark =

Species of shark

The smalleye pygmy shark (Squaliolus aliae) is a little-known species of squaliform shark in the family Dalatiidae, found in water 150–2,000 m (490–6,560 ft) deep near Japan, the Philippines, and Australia. It migrates vertically daily, spending the day in deep water and the night in shallower water. One of the smallest shark species, the smalleye pygmy shark is known to reach only 22 cm (8.7 in) long. It has a blackish, spindle-shaped body with relatively small eyes, and a spine preceding the first dorsal fin, but not the second. Bioluminescent photophores occur on its underside, which may serve to disguise its silhouette from predators. This species feeds on small squid, krill, shrimp, and bony fishes. It is aplacental viviparous. The International Union for Conservation of Nature has assessed it as Least Concern, citing its wide distribution and lack of threat from fisheries.

== Taxonomy ==
The first known specimen of the smalleye pygmy shark was a female 18 cm (7.1 in) long, caught off Donggang, Taiwan, on September 23, 1958. It was described by Taiwanese ichthyologist Teng Huo-Tu, who gave it the specific epithet alii after a woman. The name subsequently came to be rendered as aliae in scientific literature. Some authors questioned the validity of the species, and in 1977 Jeffrey Alan Seigel and colleagues synonymized S. aliae with S. laticaudus. In 1987, Kunio Sasaki and Teruya Uyeno performed morphological comparisons and reaffirmed the distinctiveness of S. aliae.

== Distribution and habitat ==
The smalleye pygmy shark appears to be widely distributed, but in patches, in the western Pacific Ocean, having been reported from off southern Japan, the Philippines, and northern and eastern Australia. It inhabits the upper and middle layers of the water column near land, at depths of 150–2,000 m (490–6,560 ft). It conducts a diel vertical migration, spending the day in deeper water and rising to shallower waters at night.

== Description ==
Among the smallest of extant sharks, the smalleye pygmy shark attains a maximum recorded length of 22 cm (8.7 in). It is shaped like a cigar and has a bulbous, pointed snout. The eyes are relatively small, with their diameters measuring 43–66% as long as the snout (compared to 61–82% in S. laticaudus). The eyes of this species also differ from S. laticaudus in that the upper rim of the eye socket is chevron-shaped rather than nearly straight. The nostrils lack substantially expanded skin flaps in front. The mouth is nearly transverse and bears thin lips; a pair of papillae (nipple-like structures) is on the upper lip that is absent in S. laticaudus. There are 20–27 upper tooth rows and 18–23 lower tooth rows. The upper teeth are slender and upright. The larger, broader lower teeth have angled and knife-like cusps, and interlock to form a continuous cutting surface. The five pairs of gill slits are tiny and uniform.

The two Squaliolus species are the only sharks that have a spine on the first dorsal fin, but not the second. The spine is usually exposed in males and covered by skin in females. The tiny first dorsal fin originates about over the rear tip of the pectoral fin. The second dorsal fin is long and low, and originates over the front half of the pelvic fin bases. The pectoral fins are short with rounded margins, and the pelvic fins are long and low. The anal fin is absent. The caudal peduncle is thin and bears slight lateral keels. Males have shorter abdomens and longer caudal peduncles than females. The caudal fin is broad and triangular, with nearly symmetrical upper and lower lobes and a prominent notch in the trailing margin of the upper lobe. The dermal denticles are flattened and not toothed or elevated on stalks. This species is dark brown to black in color, becoming light towards the fin margins. Its underside is covered by light-producing photophores.

== Biology and ecology ==
Little is known of the natural history of the smalleye pygmy shark. It feeds primarily on midwater squid, krill, shrimps, and small bony fishes such as lanternfish. The photophores on its underside may serve to camouflage its silhouette from predators by matching the downwelling light, a strategy known as "counter-illumination". Reproduction is aplacental viviparous as in other members of its family, with the young being born under 10 cm (3.9 in) long. Males attain sexual maturity around 15 cm (5.9 in) long.

== Human interactions ==
The smalleye pygmy shark is infrequently caught by fisheries because of its small size, and has no economic value. This, coupled with its wide range, has led the IUCN to list it as Least Concern.
