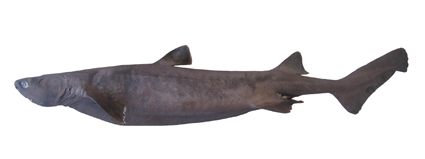

Conservation status
- Vulnerable (IUCN 3.1)

Scientific classification
- Kingdom: Animalia
- Phylum: Chordata
- Class: Chondrichthyes
- Subclass: Elasmobranchii
- Division: Selachii
- Order: Squaliformes
- Family: Dalatiidae
- Genus: Dalatias; Rafinesque, 1810
- Species: D. licha

Binomial name
- Dalatias licha (Bonnaterre, 1788)
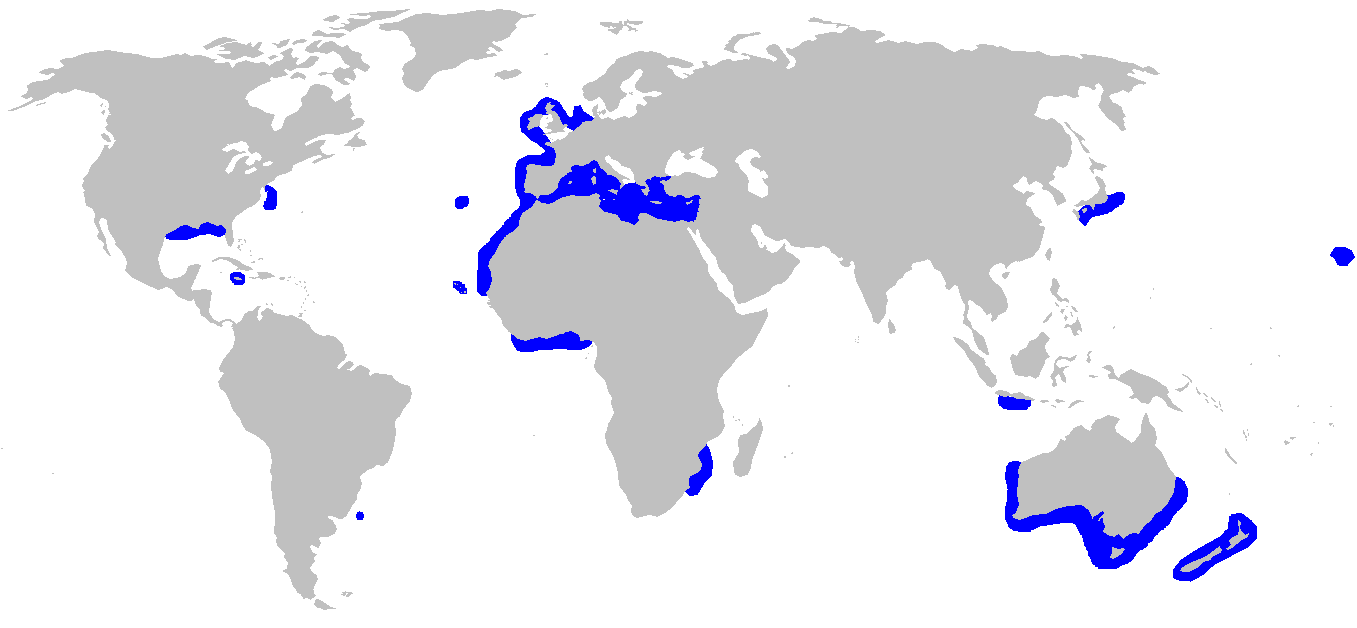
- Range of the kitefin shark

Synonyms
- Dalatias sparophagus* Rafinesque, 1810; Dalatias tachiensis Shen & Ting, 1972; Pseudoscymnus boshuensis Herre, 1935; Scymnorhinus brevipinnis Smith, 1936; Scymnorhinus phillippsi Whitley, 1931; Scymnus aquitanensis* de la Pylaie, 1835; Scymnus vulgaris Cloquet, 1822; Squalus americanus Gmelin, 1789; Squalus licha Bonnaterre, 1788; Squalus nicaeensis Risso, 1810; Squalus scymnus Voigt, 1832 * ambiguous synonym

= Kitefin shark =

Kitefin shark Temporal range: Middle Eocene–Present

Species of bioluminescent shark

The kitefin shark or seal shark (Dalatias licha) is a species of squaliform shark in the family Dalatiidae, and the type species in its genus. It is found sporadically around the world, usually close to the sea floor at depths of 200–600 m (660–1,970 ft). With a sizable oil-filled liver to maintain neutral buoyancy, this shark is able to cruise slowly through the water while expending little energy. The kitefin shark, the largest luminous vertebrate on record, has a slender body with a very short, blunt snout, large eyes, and thick lips. Its teeth are highly differentiated between the upper and lower jaws, with the upper teeth small and narrow and the lower teeth large, triangular, and serrated. Its typical length is 1.0–1.4 m (3.3–4.6 ft), though examples as long as 5.9 ft (180 cm) have been encountered.

Armed with large teeth and a strong bite, the kitefin shark is a powerful, solitary predator that takes many different types of prey, ranging from bony fishes, sharks and rays, to cephalopods, crustaceans, polychaete worms, siphonophores, and possibly carrion. It also takes bites out of animals larger than itself, similar to its smaller relative, the cookiecutter shark (Isistius brasiliensis). This shark is aplacental viviparous and gives birth to 10–14 young. The kitefin shark is fished commercially for its meat, skin, and liver oil, primarily by Portugal and Japan. A fishery targeting this species existed off the Azores from the 1970s to the 1990s, but collapsed due to overfishing and falling liver oil prices; the rapid depletion of the Azores stock is often cited as an example of the susceptibility of deep-sea sharks to human exploitation. The low reproductive rate of this species renders it susceptible to overfishing and, coupled with known population declines, has led it to be assessed as Vulnerable by the International Union for Conservation of Nature (IUCN).

== Taxonomy ==
The kitefin shark was originally described as Squalus licha by French naturalist Pierre Joseph Bonnaterre, in his 1788 Tableau encyclopédique et méthodique des trois regnes de la nature; the type specimen from "Le cap Breton" has since been lost. This species was later placed in its own genus, Dalatias, which came from the synonymy of Constantine Rafinesque's 1810 Dalatias sparophagus with S. licha. However, some authorities dispute this on the grounds that D. sparophagus is a nomen dubium, and prefer to use the next available genus name Scymnorhinus. The genus name Dalatias is derived from the Greek dalos or dalou, meaning "torch". The specific epithet licha comes from liche, the French name for this shark (from Occitan lecha, from lec, "glutton"). Additional common names used for the kitefin shark include black shark and darkie Charlie.

== Phylogeny and evolution ==
Cladistic studies have consistently found that the closest relatives of the kitefin shark are the cookiecutter sharks (Isistius), with which they share several dentitional, skeletal, and muscular similarities. Dalatias and Isistius are believed to have evolutionarily diverged shortly after the transition between the Cretaceous and Tertiary periods (65.5 Ma), as part of a larger adaptive radiation of dogfish sharks from the deep sea into relatively shallower habitats.

The oldest fossil teeth that definitively belong to the kitefin shark date to the Middle Eocene epoch, such as those recovered from Bortonian-stage deposits (43.0–37.0 Ma) in New Zealand. Dalatias fossil teeth dating to various ages have also been discovered in Europe, the former USSR, Japan, and western India. The fossil material now recognized as belonging to this species were historically described under a multitude of different names.

== Description ==
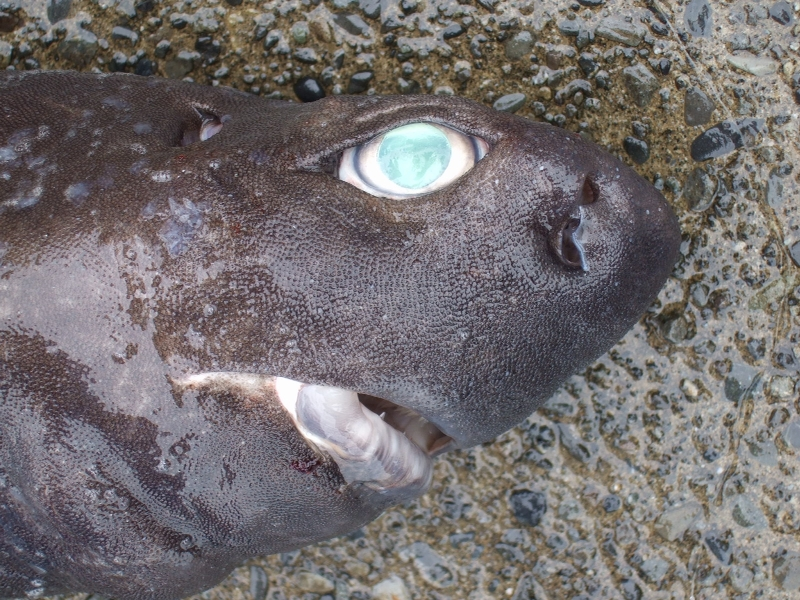
The head of a kitefin shark, showing the large eyes, stubby snout, and thick lips

The kitefin shark has a moderately elongated body with a very short, rounded snout. The eyes and spiracles are large. The lips are thick with pleats or fringes, though are not modified to be suctorial. There are 16–21 tooth rows in the upper jaw and 17–20 tooth rows in the lower jaw. The upper teeth are small and spike-shaped, curving slightly towards the corners of the mouth. The lower teeth are very large, knife-shaped, and serrated, with their bases interlocking to form a continuous cutting surface.

The first dorsal fin is slightly smaller and shorter-based than the second, and neither has spines. The first dorsal fin originates behind the free rear tip of the pectoral fins, while the second originates above the middle of the pelvic fin bases. The pectoral fins are short and rounded. The caudal fin has a prominent upper lobe with a well-developed notch near the tip, and a barely present lower lobe. The form and arrangement of the fins is similar to the Portuguese dogfish (Centroscymnus coelolepis), from which this species can be distinguished by the lack of fin spines. The dermal denticles are small and flat, with a single horizontal ridge ending in a point.

The coloration is a uniform dark brown or gray, sometimes with faint black spots on the back. The fins have white or translucent trailing edges, and the tip of the caudal fin is black. An 90 cm (3.0 ft) long kitefin shark with partial albinism, lacking pigment on 59% of its body, was caught in the Gulf of Genoa in 2003. Unlike in a previous case of an albino Portuguese dogfish, the abnormal coloration of this individual had not diminished its ability to capture prey. Most kitefin sharks are 1.0–1.4 m (3.3–4.6 ft) long and weigh 8 kg (18 lb); the maximum reported length is 1.6 m (5.2 ft), possibly 1.8 m (5.9 ft).

The kitefin shark is the largest known shark that exhibits bioluminesce. The light is generated by photophores that consist of a single photocyte within a cup-shaped pigmented cell, with lens cells on the surface. The bioluminesence is directed downwards from its front or belly. There are two hypotheses for the use of bioluminesence by D. licha; either it illuminates the sea floor while the shark is searching for prey, or it is used as a counter-illumination camouflage when approaching prey.

== Distribution and habitat ==
The kitefin shark has an almost circumglobal range in tropical and warm-temperature waters, consisting of a number of widely separated populations with likely little interchange between them. This shark has not been reported from the eastern Pacific and northern Indian Oceans. In the northern Atlantic, it occurs in the Georges Bank and the northern Gulf of Mexico, and from the North Sea to Cameroon, including around the British Isles, in the western and central Mediterranean Sea, and off Madeira and the Azores. In the Indian Ocean, it is found off South Africa and Mozambique. In the Pacific, it occurs off Japan, Java, Australia and New Zealand, and the Hawaiian Islands. There is a single record of this species in the southern Atlantic, from off southern Brazil.

An offshore, deepwater species, the kitefin shark is most common at a depth of 200–600 m (660–1,970 ft), but has been captured from the surface to as deep as 1,800 m (5,900 ft). Off the Azores this shark segregates by sex, with females most common around a depth of 230 m (750 ft) and males most common around 412–448 m (1,352–1,470 ft). The kitefin shark inhabits the outer continental shelves and upper continental slopes, and is also found around oceanic islands and seamounts. It is the only member of its family that tends to be found close to the sea floor as opposed to in the middle of the water column, though on occasion it has been captured well above the bottom.

== Biology and ecology ==
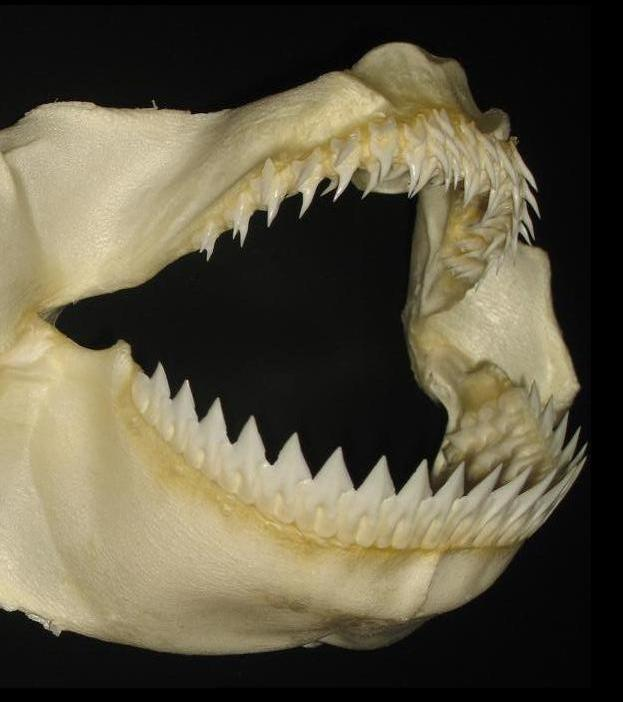
The lower teeth of the kitefin shark form a continuous cutting edge, enabling it to take bites out of larger animals.

Relatively common where it occurs, kitefin sharks are usually solitary in nature but may form small groups. It is a slow swimmer with a large liver filled with squalene, a lipid less dense than water, allowing it to maintain neutral buoyancy and hover above the bottom with little effort. Studies off the coast of North Africa and in the Gulf of Genoa have found males outnumbering females by 2:1 and 5:1 respectively; this imbalanced sex ratio has not been observed off South Africa and may reflect sampling bias. The kitefin shark is preyed upon by larger fishes and sharks, as well as by sperm whales (Physeter macrocephalus). Parasite data on this species is limited; an examination of two sharks caught off Ireland found three nematodes in the stomach lumen. One could be identified as Anisakis simplex L_{3}, while another may have been a larval Raphidascaris.

A powerful and versatile deepwater predator, the short, robust jaws of the kitefin shark give it an enormously strong bite. It feeds mainly on bony fishes (including deepwater smelts, viperfishes, scaly dragonfishes, barracudinas, greeneyes, lanternfishes, bristlemouths, cod and other gadids, grenadiers, deepwater scorpionfishes, bonito, snake mackerels, deepwater cardinalfishes, and sea toads), but also takes a wide variety of other animals, including skates, smaller sharks (Galeus, Squalus, Etmopterus and Centrophorus), squid and octopus, crustaceans (amphipods, isopods, shrimp and lobsters), polychaete worms, and siphonophores. Like the related cookiecutter shark, the kitefin shark is also capable of excising chunks of flesh from animals larger than itself, including other sharks and whales. The presence of fast-swimming fishes in its diet suggests the kitefin shark may scavenge, or have some other means of capturing faster prey. In the Mediterranean, bony fishes are the most important food year-round, with the second-most important prey being sharks in the winter and spring, crustaceans in the summer, and cephalopods in the fall. Captured males are more likely to have full stomachs than females for unknown reasons.

Reproduction in the kitefin shark is aplacental viviparous, with the embryos hatching inside the uterus and being sustained to term by yolk. Adult females have two functional ovaries and two functional uteruses; the uterus is not divided into compartments. In the Mediterranean, breeding occurs throughout the year with peaks in spring and fall; females may have a year of rest in between pregnancies. The litter size is 10–16, increasing with female size. The young are born at a length of 30–45 cm (12–18 in), varying by geographic location, after a possible gestation period of two years. The males mature sexually at a length of 77–121 cm (2.53–3.97 ft), and the females at a length of 117–159 cm (3.84–5.22 ft). There is no relationship between an individual's size at birth, size at maturity, and maximum size.

== Human interactions ==
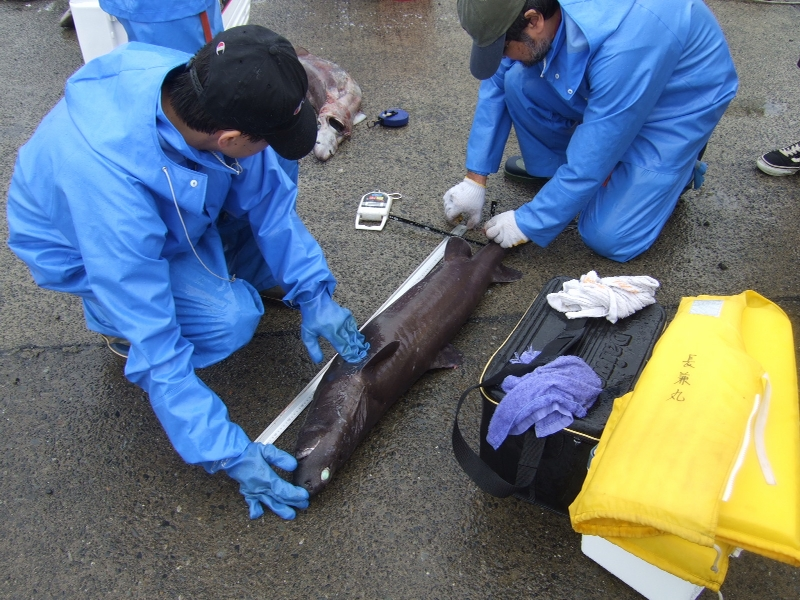
Japanese researchers measure a kitefin shark; this species has long been of economic significance.

The kitefin shark inhabits depths too great for it to be a danger to humans. Its upper teeth have been found lodged in underwater fiber-optic cables. This species has a long history of human exploitation: the meat is consumed in the eastern Atlantic and Japan, and the offal processed into fishmeal. The liver oil is utilized in Portugal, Japan, and South Africa. The skin is made into a type of shagreen useful in the making of furniture and jewelry, and is also favored for the manufacture of "boroso", a Spanish polished leather. This shark has no commercial value in the western Atlantic.

The continuing expansion of commercial fisheries into the deep sea has raised concerns about the vulnerability of this and other deepwater shark species to overfishing, as these sharks have slow growth and reproductive rates. This is exemplified by the rapid stock depletion and collapse of the Azores kitefin shark fishery. This targeted fishery began in the early 1970s for the production of liver oil. In the early 1980s, the fishing fleet was enlarged with the addition of industrial vessels equipped with demersal gillnets, resulting in a fishery peak in 1984 of 937 tons landed. After 1991, kitefin shark catches declined precipitously to under 15 tons annually which, along with a drop in the global price of liver oil, led to the fishery becoming unprofitable by the end of the decade. A population assessment has suggested that the northeastern Atlantic stock had fallen to 50% of the pre-exploitation biomass.

Fisheries operating off Portugal and Japan are responsible for most commercial landings of the kitefin shark, generally as bycatch in bottom trawls and on hook-and-line. Portugal reported a kitefin shark bycatch of 282 tons in 2000 and 119 tons in 2003. In other areas of the northeastern Atlantic this shark is rare and reported catches are likely confounded by misidentifications of other species; some are caught by mixed-species gillnet fisheries operating in deep water west of the British Isles, where surveys suggest that kitefin shark numbers may have declined by 94% since the 1970s. In the Mediterranean, this shark is caught incidentally by bottom trawl and gillnet fisheries. Although it is generally discarded alive, many are unable to return to deep water and do not survive. In the Southern Hemisphere, catches by the Australian South East Trawl Fishery are increasing following the relaxation of regulations regarding seafood mercury content; this species is not included under Australian fishery quotas. New Zealand kitefin shark catches peaked from 1986 to 1997. In June 2018 the New Zealand Department of Conservation classified the kitefin shark as "Not Threatened" with the qualifier "Secure Overseas" under the New Zealand Threat Classification System. The International Union for Conservation of Nature has assessed the kitefin shark as a vulnerable species in light of documented population declines.

== See also ==
- List of prehistoric cartilaginous fish
