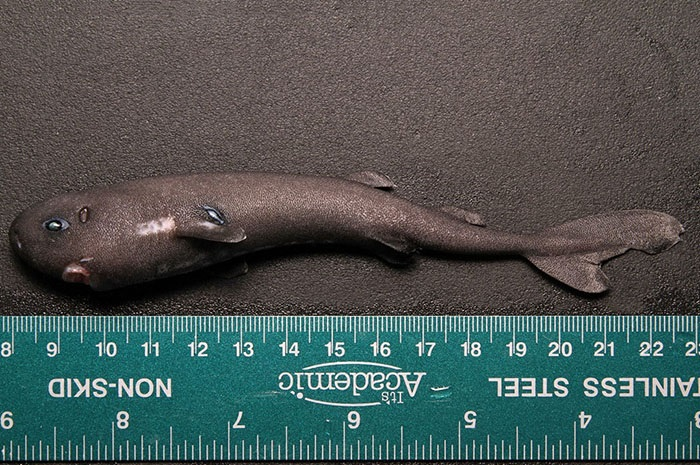
- The only known specimen of M. mississippiensis

Conservation status
- Least Concern (IUCN 3.1)

Scientific classification
- Kingdom: Animalia
- Phylum: Chordata
- Class: Chondrichthyes
- Subclass: Elasmobranchii
- Division: Selachii
- Order: Squaliformes
- Family: Dalatiidae
- Genus: Mollisquama
- Species: M. mississippiensis

Binomial name
- Mollisquama mississippiensis Grace, Doosey, Denton, Naylor, H. L. Bart & Maisey, 2019

= Mollisquama mississippiensis =

American pocket shark

Species of pocket shark

Mollisquama mississippiensis or the American pocket shark is a species of pocket shark native to the Gulf of Mexico. It is the second species of pocket shark to be described.

== Discovery ==
The shark was first discovered by scientists from Tulane University that were conducting a study on sperm whales in 2010. In 2013, the National Oceanic and Atmospheric Administration identified it as a pocket shark, the first to be found in its region. A previously found specimen of a different pocket shark species was caught off the coast of Chile in 1979 and was used to identify the two different species due to their differences in size, vertebrae and numerous light-producing photophores.

== Description ==
The head is bulbous, resembling that of a whale. The shark is very small, at only 5.5 inches (140 mm). Near the gills are two "pockets" that secrete a luminous fluid which may enable the shark to hunt. The body is grey with the fins being darker. The areas around the gills are cream colored. There are clusters of photophores around the body, which are able to produce light.
