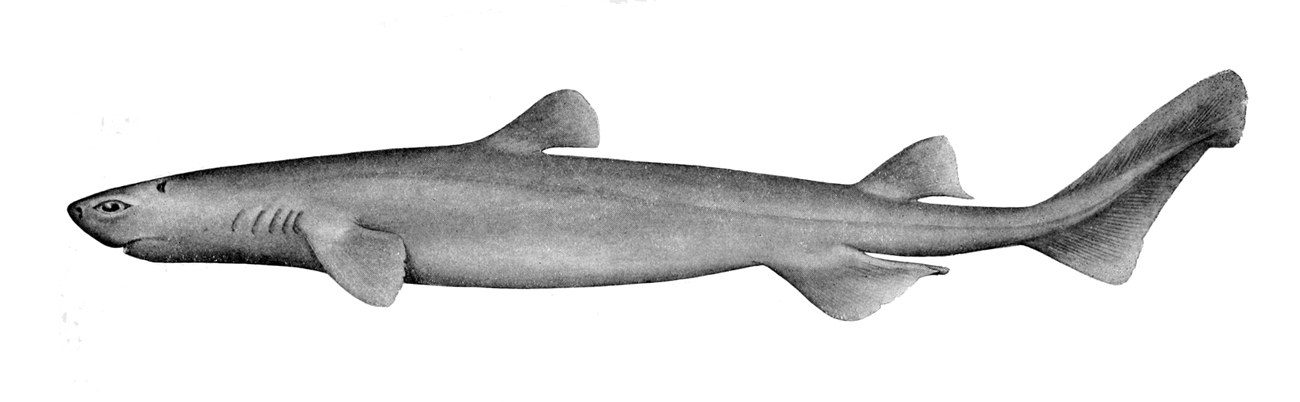
- Kitefin shark, Dalatias licha

Scientific classification
- Kingdom: Animalia
- Phylum: Chordata
- Class: Chondrichthyes
- Subclass: Elasmobranchii
- Division: Selachii
- Order: Squaliformes
- Family: Dalatiidae; J. E. Gray, 1851

Type species
- Squalus licha Bonnaterre, 1788

Diversity
- Eight genera, 14 species, See text.

= Dalatiidae =

Dalatiidae Temporal range: Paleogene-Recent, 61.6–0 Ma

Family of sharks

The Dalatiidae are the family of kitefin sharks of the order Squaliformes (the term "kitefin shark" also refers specifically to the species Dalatias licha). Members of this family are small, under 2 m (6.6 ft) long, and are found worldwide. They have cigar-shaped bodies with narrow heads and rounded snouts. Several species have specialized bioluminescent organs. Though eight genera are in this family, three of them are monotypic.

== Genera and species ==
- Dalatias Rafinesque, 1810
  - Dalatias licha (Bonnaterre, 1788) (kitefin shark)
  - †Dalatias turkmenicus (Glikman, 1964)
  - †Dalatias orientalis (Malyshkina et al., 2023)
- Euprotomicroides Hulley and M. J. Penrith, 1966
  - Euprotomicroides zantedeschia Hulley and M. J. Penrith, 1966 (tail-light shark)
- Euprotomicrus T. N. Gill, 1865
  - Euprotomicrus bispinatus (Quoy & Gaimard, 1824) (pygmy shark)
- Heteroscymnoides Fowler, 1934
  - Heteroscymnoides marleyi Fowler, 1934 (longnose pygmy shark)
- Isistius T. N. Gill, 1865
  - Isistius brasiliensis (Quoy & Gaimard, 1824) (cookiecutter shark)
  - Isistius plutodus Garrick & S. Springer, 1964 (largetooth cookiecutter shark)
- Mollisquama Dolganov, 1984
  - Mollisquama parini Dolganov, 1984 (pocket shark)
  - Mollisquama mississippiensis Grace, Doosey, Denton, Naylor, H. L. Bart & Maisey, 2019 (American pocket shark)
- Squaliolus H. M. Smith and Radcliffe, 1912
  - Squaliolus aliae Teng, 1959 (smalleye pygmy shark)
  - Squaliolus laticaudus H. M. Smith and Radcliffe, 1912 (spined pygmy shark)
- †Eosqualiolus Adnet, 2006
  - †Eosqualiolus aturensis Adnet, 2006
  - †Eosqualiolus skrovinai Underwood & Schlogl, 2012
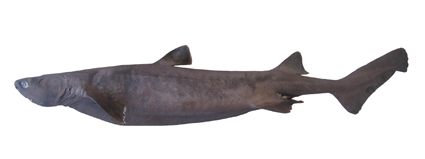
Dalatias licha

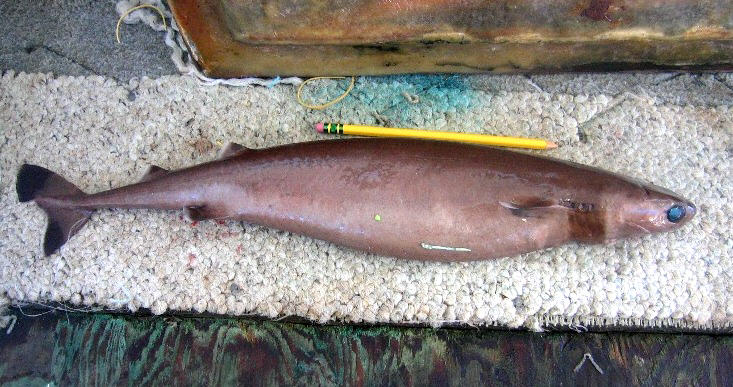
Cookiecutter shark, Isistius brasiliensis

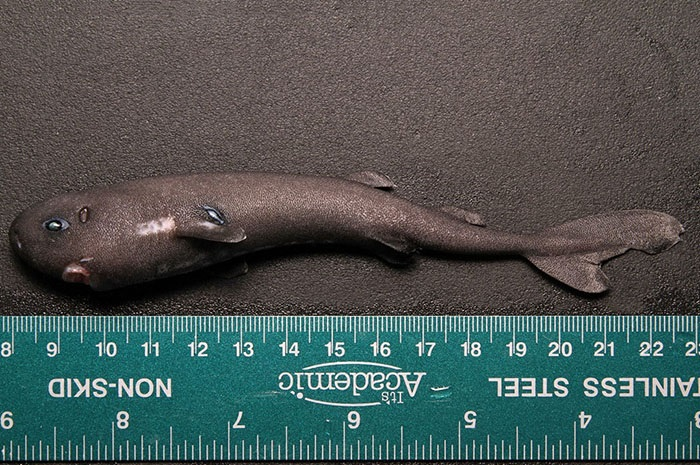
Mollisquama parini

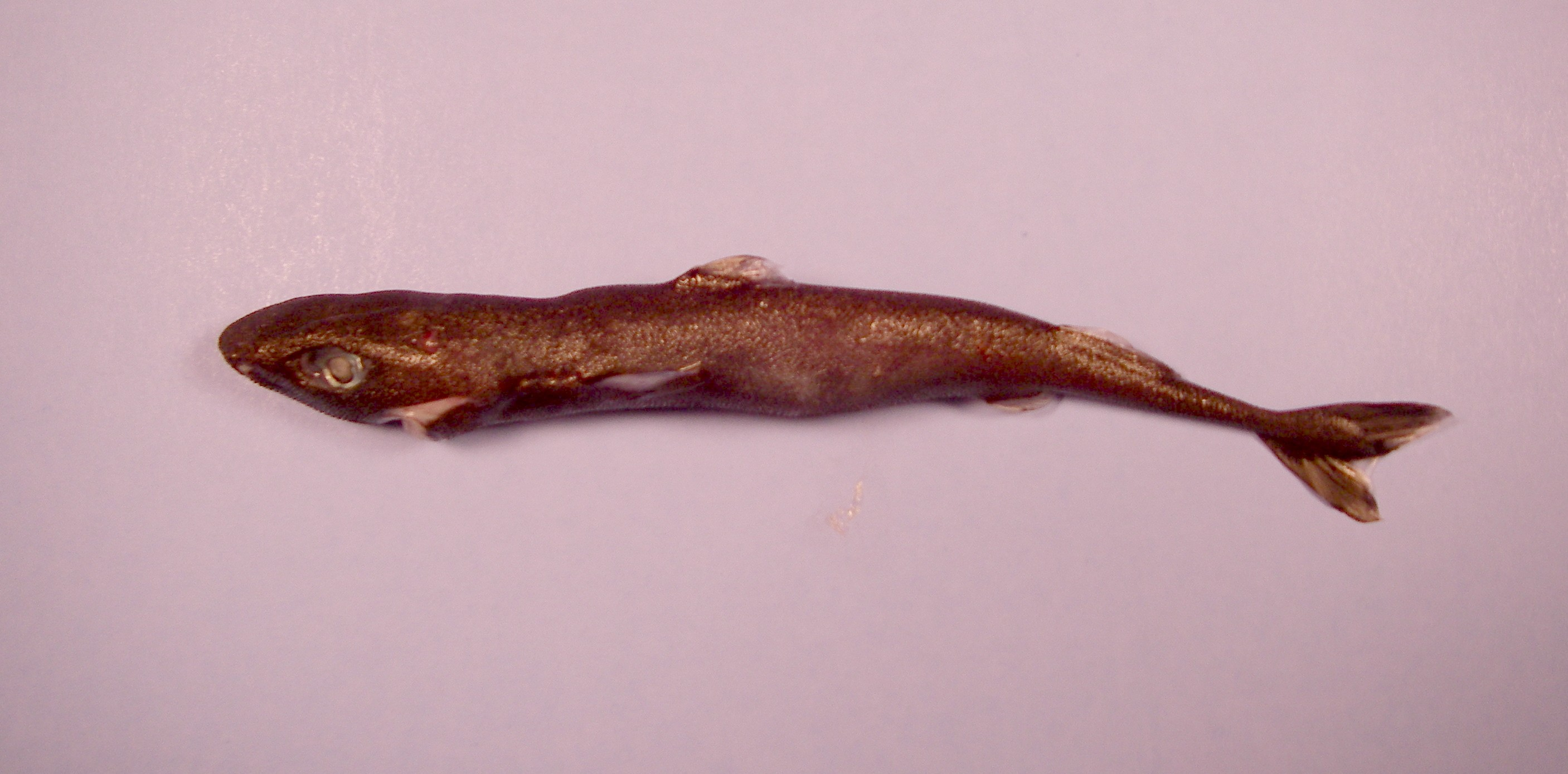
Squaliolus laticaudus

Euprotomicrus bispinatus

== See also ==
- List of fish families
- Deep sea fish
