= Eosqualiolus =

Eosqualiolus Temporal range: Eocene-Miocene

Scientific classification
- Domain: Eukaryota
- Kingdom: Animalia
- Phylum: Chordata
- Class: Chondrichthyes
- Subclass: Elasmobranchii
- Division: Selachii
- Order: Squaliformes
- Family: Dalatiidae
- Genus: †Eosqualiolus; Adnet, 2006

Genus of sharks

Eosqualiolus is an extinct genus of sharks in the family Dalatiidae. It was described by Sylvain Adnet in 2006, and the type species is E. aturensis, which existed during the middle Eocene of what is now France. A new species, E. skrovinai, which existed in what is now Slovakia during the Miocene period, was described by Charlie J. Underwood and Jan Schlogl in 2012, and named in honour of Michal Škrovina. E. skrovinai was described from 14 fossil teeth found in the Laksarska Nova Ves Formation; 9 upper and 5 lower, some of which were partial and some were complete.

== Species ==
- Eosqualiolus aturensis Adnet, 2006
- Eosqualiolus skrovinai Underwood & Schlogl, 2012
