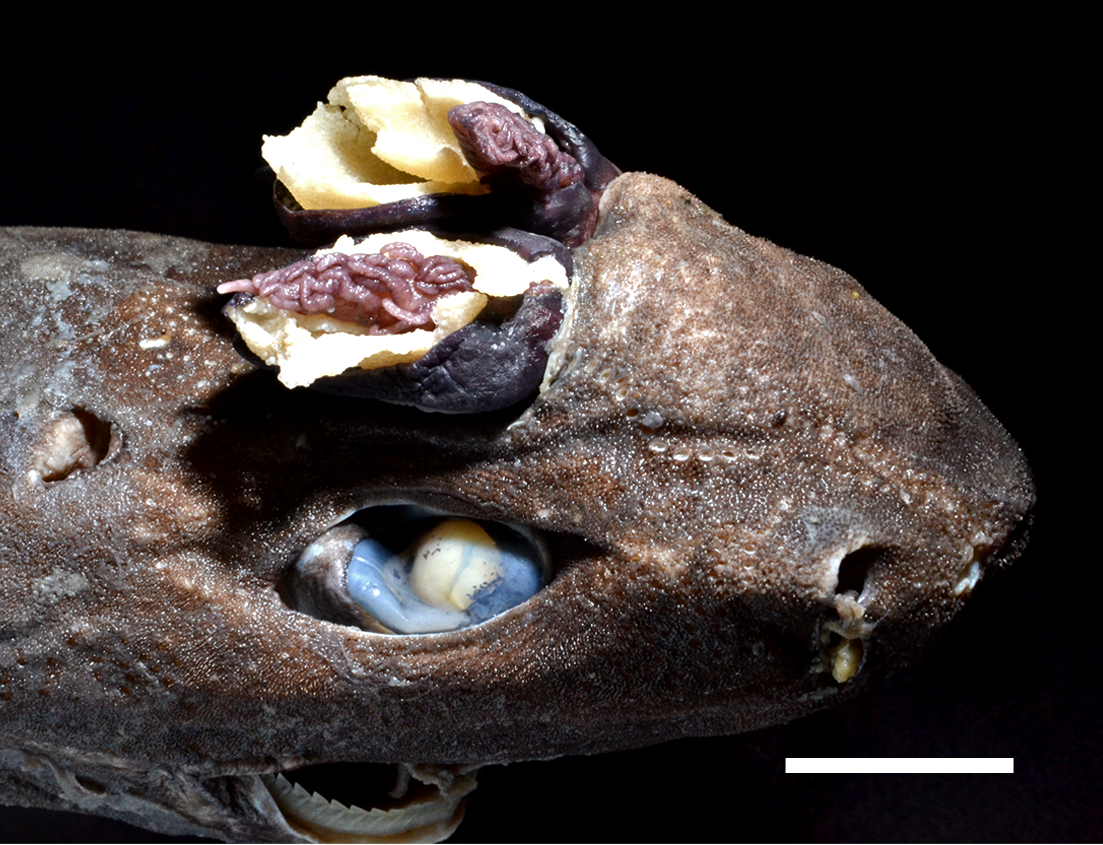
- Etmopterus compagnoi individual parasitized by Anelasma squalicola

Conservation status
- Least Concern (IUCN 3.1)

Scientific classification
- Kingdom: Animalia
- Phylum: Chordata
- Class: Chondrichthyes
- Subclass: Elasmobranchii
- Division: Selachii
- Order: Squaliformes
- Family: Etmopteridae
- Genus: Etmopterus
- Species: E. compagnoi

Binomial name
- Etmopterus compagnoi Fricke & Koch, 1990

= Etmopterus compagnoi =

Species of shark

Etmopterus compagnoi, also known as Compagno's lanternshark, is a shark of the family Etmopteridae found in the southeast Atlantic off southwestern Cape Province and northern Natal in South Africa at a depth of 479 to 923 metres. It is sometimes considered conspecific with the brown lanternshark.
