= Longnose pygmy shark =

Conservation status
- Least Concern (IUCN 3.1)

Scientific classification
- Kingdom: Animalia
- Phylum: Chordata
- Class: Chondrichthyes
- Subclass: Elasmobranchii
- Division: Selachii
- Order: Squaliformes
- Family: Dalatiidae
- Genus: Heteroscymnoides; Fowler, 1934
- Species: H. marleyi

Binomial name
- Heteroscymnoides marleyi Fowler, 1934
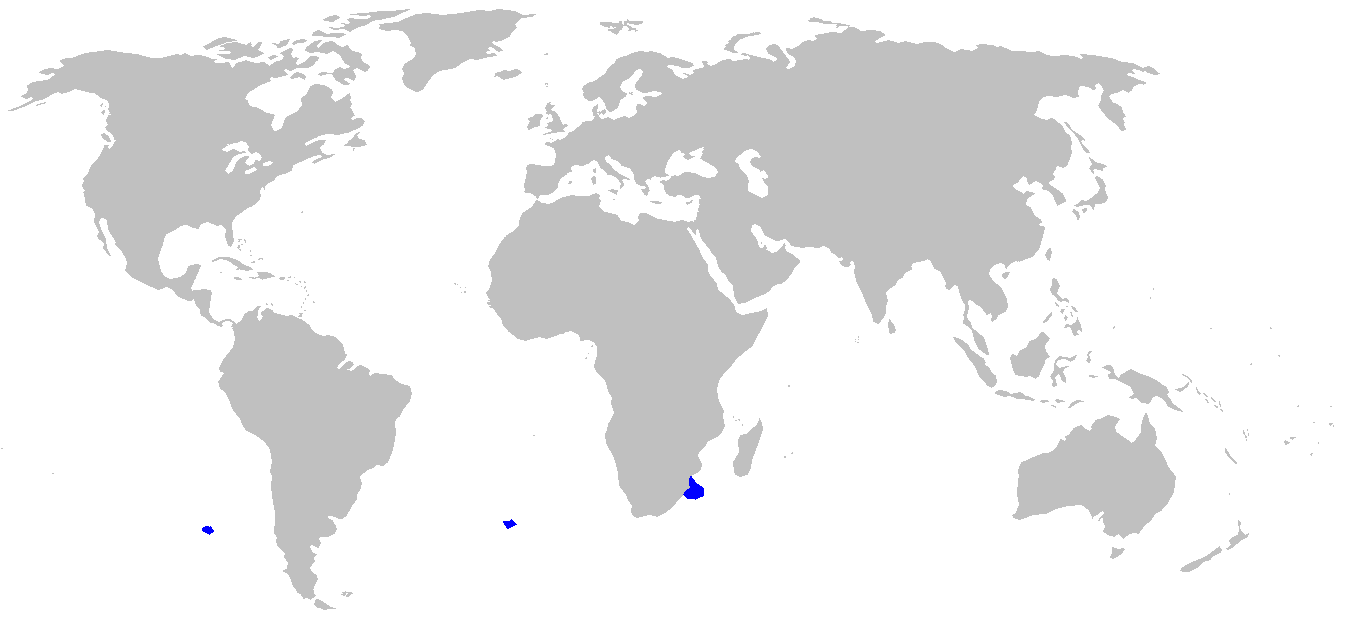
- Range of the longnose pygmy shark

Species of shark

The longnose pygmy shark (Heteroscymnoides marleyi) is a rare species of squaliform shark in the family Dalatiidae and the only member its genus. It is known only from a handful of specimens collected from the cold oceanic waters of the Southern Hemisphere, between the surface and a depth of 502 m (1,647 ft). Reaching 37 cm (15 in) in length, this diminutive shark is characterized by a slender, dark brown body with a very long, bulbous snout. In addition, it has two spineless dorsal fins of nearly equal size, with the origin of the first lying over the pectoral fin bases. The longnose pygmy shark does not appear substantially threatened by fisheries, and has been assessed as Least Concern by the International Union for Conservation of Nature (IUCN).

== Taxonomy ==
The longnose pygmy shark was described by American zoologist Henry Weed Fowler in a 1934 volume of Proceedings of the Academy of Natural Sciences of Philadelphia, based on a 13 cm (5.1 in) long female collected off Point Ocean Beach in Durban, South Africa. Fowler had originally thought the shark to belong to the genus Heteroscymnus (a junior synonym of Somniosus), and thus he created for it the new genus Heteroscymnoides from the Greek oidos ("resemblance"). He gave it the specific epithet marleyi in honor of Harold Walter Bell-Marley, and his contributions to the study of South African fishes. The relationship between Heteroscymnoides and the rest of its family is uncertain.

== Distribution and habitat ==
The longnose pygmy shark has been caught in the western Indian Ocean off eastern KwaZulu-Natal, in the southeastern Atlantic Ocean near the Walvis Ridge, and in the southwestern Pacific Ocean off Chile. These records suggest that it may have a circumglobal distribution in the Southern Hemisphere, inhabiting subantarctic waters and cold ocean currents, including the Benguela and the Humboldt. This species occurs in the open ocean between the surface and a depth of 502 m (1,647 ft), in water 830–4,000 m (2,720–13,120 ft) deep.

== Description ==
The largest known specimen of the longnose pygmy shark is a male 37 cm (15 in) long. Its body is slender and moderately compressed from side to side. The long, bulbous snout comprises about half the head length, and comes to a blunt, conical tip. The eyes are large, lack nictitating membranes (protective third eyelids), and are followed by large spiracles. The nostrils are long and angled, with a very short flap of skin on their anterior rims. The mouth is transverse and surrounded by thin, smooth lips. The upper teeth number 22 rows and are small and upright with a single narrow cusp. The lower teeth number 23 rows and are much larger, broader, and knife-like, and interlock to form a continuous cutting surface. The five pairs of gill slits are tiny and of uniform width.

The two dorsal fins lack spines. The first dorsal originates over the pectoral fin bases; the second dorsal is slightly larger than the first but is about equal in base length, and originates over the middle of the pelvic fin bases. The pectoral fins are short and somewhat paddle-like. There is no anal fin. The caudal fin is broad, with a well-developed lower lobe and a deep ventral notch near the tip of the upper lobe. The small dermal denticles have sharp wedge-shaped crowns bearing median ridges, and are placed on stalks (pedicels). This species is dark brown, with prominent blackish, then light bands at the fin margins. The underside is covered by minute light-producing photophores.

== Biology and ecology ==
The natural history of the longnose pygmy shark is poorly known. It probably feeds on pelagic fishes and invertebrates, and is presumably aplacental viviparous with a small litter size like other members of its family. The 13 cm (5.1 in) long type specimen had an umbilical scar, suggesting that it was close to the birth size. Males and females attain sexual maturity at under 36 and 33 cm (14 and 13 in) long respectively.

== Human interactions ==
Only six specimens of the longnose pygmy shark are known to science. Its small size and oceanic habits appear to preclude its capture by most fisheries. Coupled with its wide distribution, this species does not seem threatened by human activity and has been listed under Least Concern by the International Union for Conservation of Nature (IUCN).
