= Palaeomicroides aritai =

Scientific classification
- Kingdom: Animalia
- Phylum: Arthropoda
- Class: Insecta
- Order: Lepidoptera
- Family: Micropterigidae
- Genus: Palaeomicroides
- Species: P. aritai

Binomial name
- Palaeomicroides aritai Hashimoto, 1996

Species of moth

Palaeomicroides aritai is a species of moth belonging to the family Micropterigidae. It was described by Satoshi Hashimoto in 1996. It is endemic to Taiwan. The type locality is Fenqihu at about 1,400 m (4,600 ft) above sea level in Chiayi County, central Taiwan. It is named after collector of the holotype, professor Yutaka Arita.

The length of the forewings is 4.3 mm for the holotype, a male.
