= Palaeomicroides obscurella =

Scientific classification
- Kingdom: Animalia
- Phylum: Arthropoda
- Class: Insecta
- Order: Lepidoptera
- Family: Micropterigidae
- Genus: Palaeomicroides
- Species: P. obscurella

Binomial name
- Palaeomicroides obscurella Issiki, 1931

Species of moth

Palaeomicroides obscurella is a species of moth belonging to the family Micropterigidae. It was described by Syuti Issiki in 1931. It is endemic to Taiwan. Adults have been collected in July at about 1,400 m (4,600 ft) above sea level in central Taiwan.

The length of the forewings is 4.3 mm for males and 4.7–4.9 mm for females.
