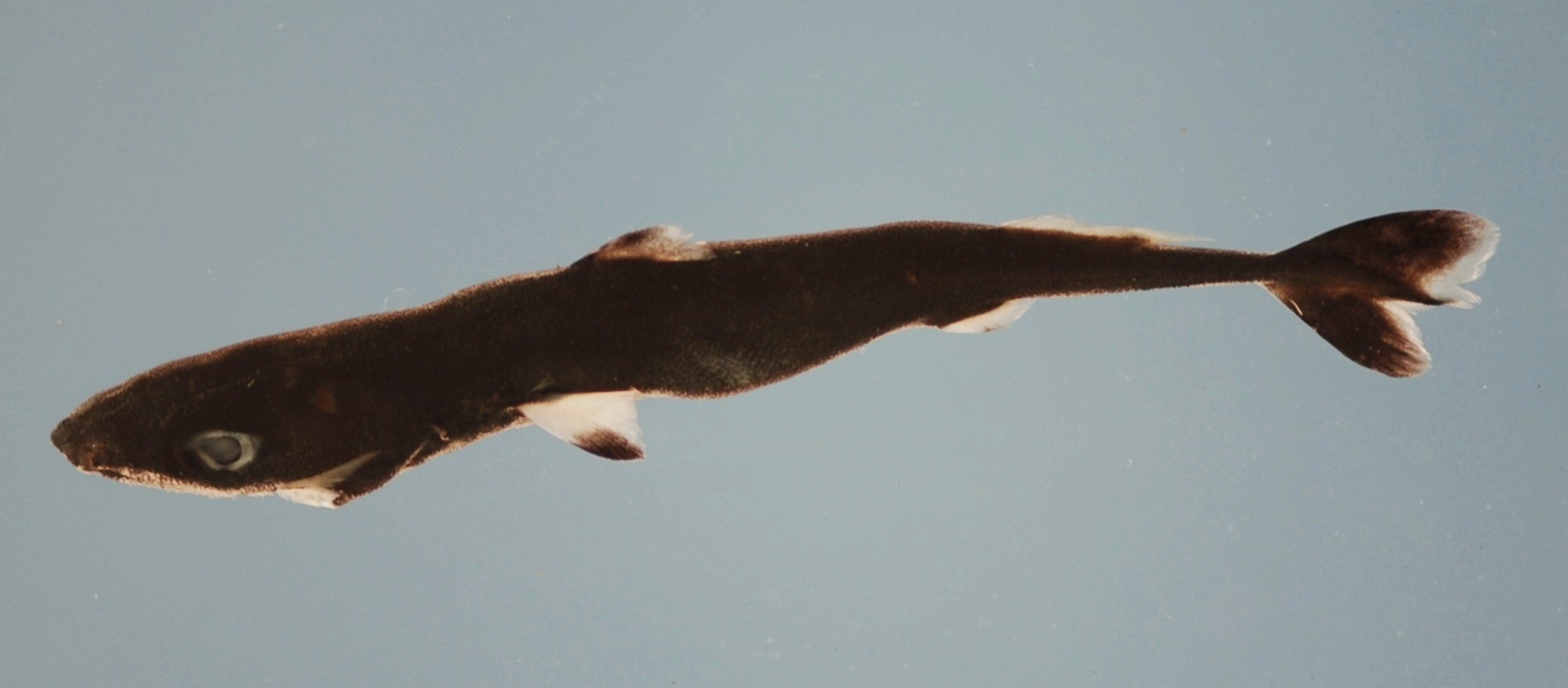
- Spined pygmy shark (Squaliolus laticaudus)

Scientific classification
- Kingdom: Animalia
- Phylum: Chordata
- Class: Chondrichthyes
- Subclass: Elasmobranchii
- Division: Selachii
- Order: Squaliformes
- Family: Dalatiidae
- Genus: Squaliolus; H. M. Smith & Radcliffe, 1912

Type species
- Squaliolus laticaudus H. M. Smith & Radcliffe, 1912

= Squaliolus =

Squaliolus Temporal range: Miocene to present

Genus of sharks

Squaliolus is a genus of deep-sea squaliform sharks in the family Dalatiidae.

== Species ==
- Squaliolus aliae Teng, 1959 (smalleye pygmy shark)
- Squaliolus laticaudus H. M. Smith & Radcliffe, 1912 (spined pygmy shark)

== See also ==
- List of prehistoric cartilaginous fish
