= Palaeomicroides fasciatella =

Scientific classification
- Kingdom: Animalia
- Phylum: Arthropoda
- Class: Insecta
- Order: Lepidoptera
- Family: Micropterigidae
- Genus: Palaeomicroides
- Species: P. fasciatella

Binomial name
- Palaeomicroides fasciatella Issiki, 1931

Species of moth

Palaeomicroides fasciatella is a species of moth belonging to the family Micropterigidae. It was described by Syuti Issiki in 1931. It is endemic to Taiwan.
