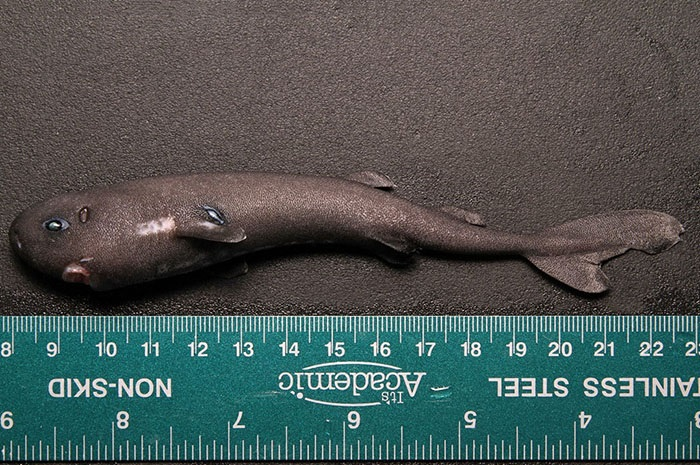
- American pocket shark (Mollisquama mississippiensis) specimen found in the Gulf of Mexico

Scientific classification
- Kingdom: Animalia
- Phylum: Chordata
- Class: Chondrichthyes
- Subclass: Elasmobranchii
- Division: Selachii
- Superorder: Squalomorphi
- Series: Squalida
- Order: Squaliformes
- Family: Dalatiidae
- Genus: Mollisquama; Dolganov, 1984

Type species
- Mollisquama parini Dolganov, 1984

Species
- 2, see text

= Mollisquama =

Genus of sharks

Mollisquama is a genus of pocket sharks in the family Dalatiidae. There are two known species each only known from a single specimen; one found off the coast of Chile and the other found in the Gulf of Mexico.

== Species ==
There are currently two known species:

- Mollisquama mississippiensis Grace, Doosey, Denton, Naylor, H. L. Bart & Maisey, 2019
- Mollisquama parini Dolganov, 1984
