= Palaeomicroides caeruleimaculella =

Scientific classification
- Kingdom: Animalia
- Phylum: Arthropoda
- Class: Insecta
- Order: Lepidoptera
- Family: Micropterigidae
- Genus: Palaeomicroides
- Species: P. caeruleimaculella

Binomial name
- Palaeomicroides caeruleimaculella Issiki, 1931

Species of moth

Palaeomicroides caeruleimaculella is a species of moth belonging to the family Micropterigidae. It was described by Syuti Issiki in 1931. It is endemic to Taiwan.

== Taxonomy ==
Palaeomicroides caeruleimaculella was described by Syuti Issiki in 1931.

== Distribution ==
This species is endemic to Taiwan.
