= Palaeomicroides =

Scientific classification
- Kingdom: Animalia
- Phylum: Arthropoda
- Class: Insecta
- Order: Lepidoptera
- Family: Micropterigidae
- Genus: Palaeomicroides; Issiki, 1931

Species
- 7 (see text)

Genus of moths in family Micropterigidae

Palaeomicroides is a genus of small primitive metallic moths in the family Micropterigidae. The genus is endemic to Taiwan.

== Species ==
There are seven recognized species:

- Palaeomicroides aritai Hashimoto, 1996
- Palaeomicroides caeruleimaculella Issiki, 1931
- Palaeomicroides costipunctella Issiki, 1931
- Palaeomicroides discopurpurella Issiki, 1931
- Palaeomicroides fasciatella Issiki, 1931
- Palaeomicroides marginella Issiki, 1931
- Palaeomicroides obscurella Issiki, 1931
