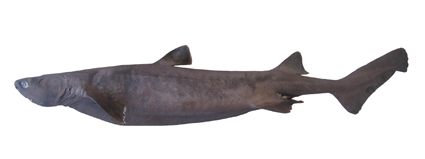
- Dalatias licha

Scientific classification
- Kingdom: Animalia
- Phylum: Chordata
- Class: Chondrichthyes
- Subclass: Elasmobranchii
- Division: Selachii
- Order: Squaliformes
- Family: Dalatiidae
- Genus: Dalatias; Rafinesque, 1810

Type species
- Dalatias licha Bonnaterre, 1788

Species
- D. licha (Bonnaterre, 1788); †D. turkmenicus Glikman, 1964; †D. orientalis Malyshkina et al., 2023

= Dalatias =

Dalatias Temporal range: Late Paleocene–Present

Genus of sharks

Dalatias is a genus of kitefin sharks that have lived since the Middle Eocene. The genus contains one extant and two extinct species: D. licha (the type species), D. turkmenicus and D. orientalis. Because D. turkmenicus was described on the basis of a single tooth crown, D. licha was considered as the only valid species within the genus until Malyshkina et al. (2023) described a third species, D. orientalis, from the Middle Miocene Duho Formation in Pohang, South Korea. D. turkmenicus was found in Turkmenistan from Late Paleocene.
