= Teng Huo-tu =

Teng Huo-tu 鄧火土
- Born: 1911
- Died: 1978 (aged 66–67)
- Occupation: Ichthyologist

Teng Huo-tu (Chinese: 鄧火土; pinyin: Dèng Huǒtǔ; 1911–1978) was an ichthyologist with the Taiwan Fisheries Research Institute (台灣省水產試驗所). Much of his work involved classification of chondricthyes, especially sharks.

In 1959, Teng officially described the smalleye pygmy shark.

While at the Fisheries Research Institute, Teng directed the construction of the Hai Kung, the first Taiwanese ship to complete an Antarctic expedition, in 1977.
