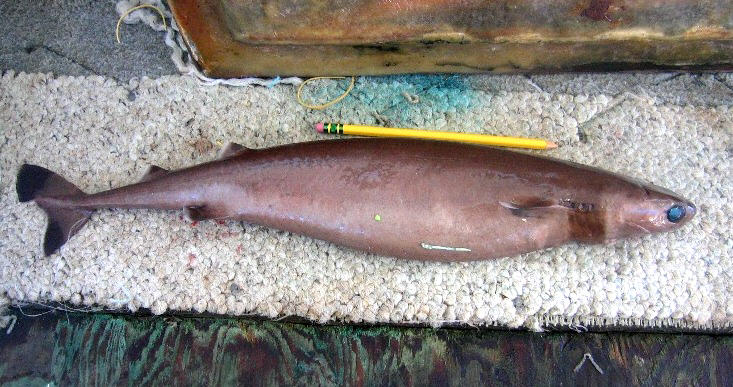
- Cookiecutter shark (I. brasiliensis)

Scientific classification
- Kingdom: Animalia
- Phylum: Chordata
- Class: Chondrichthyes
- Subclass: Elasmobranchii
- Division: Selachii
- Order: Squaliformes
- Family: Dalatiidae
- Genus: Isistius; T. N. Gill, 1865

Type species
- Isistius brasiliensis (Quoy & Gaimard, 1824)

= Isistius =

Isistius Temporal range: 56–0 Ma Thanetian to Present

Genus of sharks

Isistius is a genus of dogfish sharks in the family Dalatiidae. They are commonly known as cookiecutter sharks. Members of the genus are known for their unusual behaviour and dentition.

== Species ==
- Isistius brasiliensis Quoy & Gaimard, 1824 (cookiecutter shark)
- Isistius plutodus Garrick & S. Springer, 1964 (largetooth cookiecutter shark)
- †Isistius triangulus Probst, 1879
- †Isistius trituratus Winkler, 1876

== Habits ==
The cookiecutter sharks, or cigar sharks, are unusual in the manner in which they replace their teeth. Instead of replacing teeth singly as they get damaged or lost, for example in hunting, such sharks replace the whole set. They can repeat such replacement throughout their lifetimes.

Cookiecutter sharks often attack large shoals of fish, but have been known to circle fishing vessels to get an easy meal. They are particularly notorious for biting small chunks off of a prey animal in passing. Large prey, such as swordfish and cetaceans, may bear several healed wounds from such bites.

Weaker prey may be injured enough to be weakened until they are unable to swim properly. They then are prone to sinking, enabling these sharks to gorge. Isistius species can eat half of their own body weight at a time.

== See also ==
- List of prehistoric cartilaginous fish
