= Suctorial =

Adaptation of sucking in biology

Suctorial pertains to the adaptation for sucking or suction, as possessed by marine parasites such as the Cookiecutter shark, specifically in a specialised lip organ enabling attachment to the host.

Suctorial organs of a different form are possessed by the Solifugae arachnids, enabling the climbing of smooth, vertical surfaces.

Another variation on the suctorial organ can be found as part of the glossa proboscis of Masarinae (pollen wasps), enabling nectar feeding from the deep and narrow corolla of flowers.
