= Pygmy shark =

- Drawing by Dr Tony Ayling

Conservation status
- Least Concern (IUCN 3.1)

Scientific classification
- Kingdom: Animalia
- Phylum: Chordata
- Class: Chondrichthyes
- Subclass: Elasmobranchii
- Division: Selachii
- Order: Squaliformes
- Family: Dalatiidae
- Genus: Euprotomicrus; T. N. Gill, 1865
- Species: E. bispinatus

Binomial name
- Euprotomicrus bispinatus (Quoy & Gaimard, 1824)
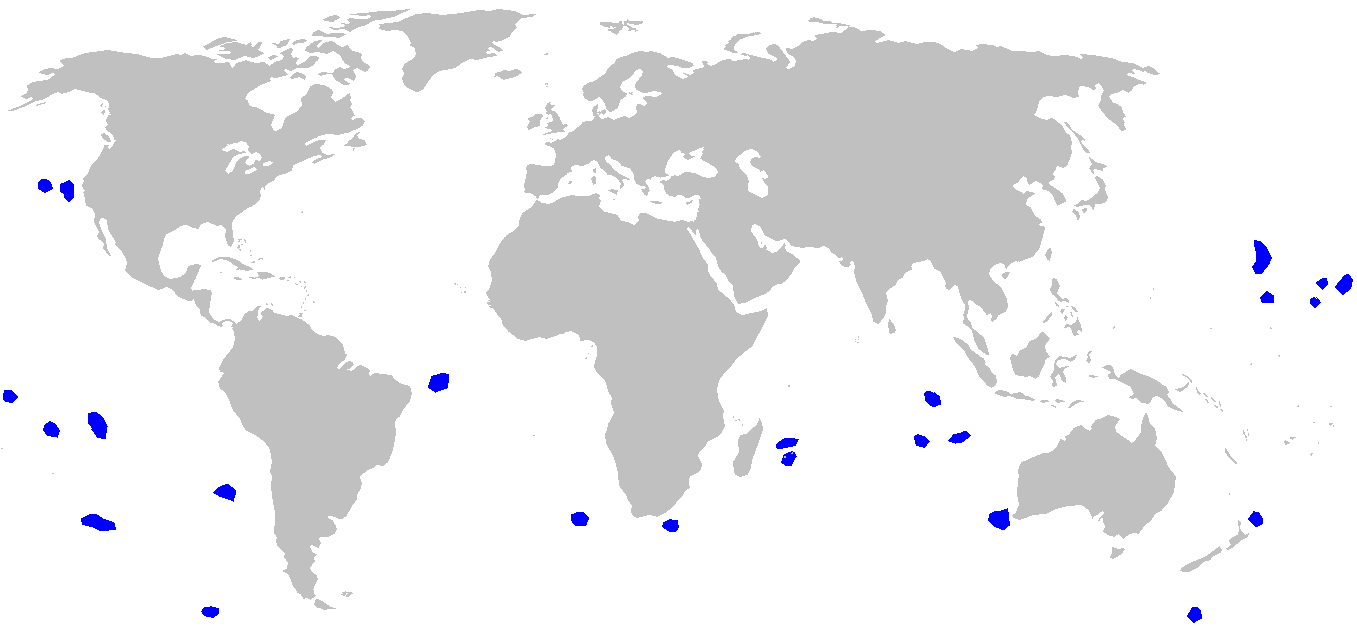
- Range of pygmy shark (in blue)

Species of shark

The pygmy shark (Euprotomicrus bispinatus), the second-smallest of all the shark species after the dwarf lanternshark, is a squaliform shark of the family Dalatiidae, the only member of the genus Euprotomicrus. Their lengths are up to about 25 cm (10 in) for females and about 22 cm (8.7 in) for males.

Pygmy sharks are ovoviviparous and produce about eight young in each litter.

== Conservation status ==
In June 2018 the New Zealand Department of Conservation classified the pygmy shark as "Not Threatened" with the qualifier "Secure Overseas" under the New Zealand Threat Classification System.
