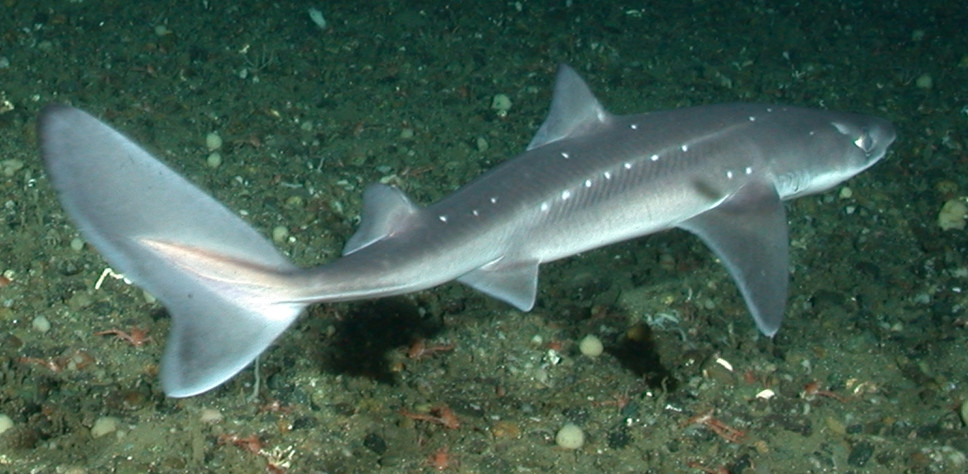
- Pacific spiny dogfish, Squalus suckleyi

Scientific classification
- Kingdom: Animalia
- Phylum: Chordata
- Class: Chondrichthyes
- Subclass: Elasmobranchii
- Division: Selachii
- Superorder: Squalomorphi
- Series: Squalida
- Order: Squaliformes; Goodrich, 1909

Type species
- Squalus acanthias Linnaeus, 1758

= Squaliformes =

Squaliformes Temporal range: Late Jurassic–Recent

Order of fishes

The Squaliformes /ˌskwɒlɪˈfɔːrmiːz/ are an order of sharks that includes about 126 species in seven families.

Members of the order have two dorsal fins, which usually possess spines, they usually have a sharp head, no anal fin or nictitating membrane, and five gill slits. In most other respects, however, they are quite variable in form and size. Most species of the squaliform order live in saltwater or brackish water. They are found worldwide, from northern to tropical waters, and from shallow coastal seas to the open ocean.

All members of the family Etmoperidae and Dalatiidae and Zameus squamulosus possess photophores, luminous organs, and exhibit intrinsic bioluminescence. Bioluminescence evolved once in Squaliformes, approximately 111–153 million years ago, and helped the Squaliformes radiate and adapt to the deep sea. The common ancestor of Dalatiidae, Etmopteridae, Somniosidae, and Oxynotidae possessed a luminous organ and used bioluminescence for camouflage by counterillumination. Counterillumination is an active form of camouflage in which an organism emits light to match the intensity of downwelling light to hide from predators below. Currently, bioluminescence provides different functions for Squaliformes based on the family. Dalatiidae and Zameus squamulosus possess simple photophores and use bioluminescence for ventral counter-illumination. Etmopteridae possess more complex photophores and utilize bioluminescence for ventral counter illumination as well as species recognition.

Many squaliforms have a spine in front of each of the two dorsal fins, likely a trait of the common ancestor of this clade. The clade likely originated in the post-Jurassic shallow waters of the northern Tethyal margin.

== Classification ==
Family Centrophoridae Bleeker, 1859 (gulper sharks)

- Genus Centrophorus
- Genus Deania

Family Dalatiidae (J. E. Gray, 1851) (kitefin sharks)

- Genus Euprotomicroides
- Genus Heteroscymnoides
- Genus Mollisquama
- Genus Dalatias
- Genus Isistius
- Genus Euprotomicrus
- Genus Squaliolus

Family Etmopteridae Fowler, 1934 (lantern sharks)

- Genus Aculeola
- Genus Centroscyllium
- Genus Etmopterus
- Genus Trigonognathus

Family Oxynotidae Gill, 1872 (rough sharks)

- Genus Oxynotus

Family Somniosidae D. S. Jordan, 1888 (sleeper sharks)

- Genus Centroscymnus
- Genus Centroselachus
- Genus Scymnodalatias
- Genus Scymnodon
- Genus Somniosus
- Genus Zameus

Family Squalidae Blainville, 1816 (dogfish sharks)

- Genus Cirrhigaleus
- Genus Squalus

Family	Image	Common name	Genera	Species	Description
Centrophoridae		Gulper sharks	2	20	Gulper sharks are usually deepwater fish. While some, such as the gulper shark Centrophorus granulosus, are found worldwide and fished commercially, others are uncommon and little-known. Their usual prey is other fish; some are known to feed on squid, octopus, and shrimp. Some species live on the bottom (benthic), while others are pelagic. They are ovoviviparous, with the female retaining the egg-cases in her body until they hatch. They are small to medium sharks, ranging from 79 centimetres (2.59 ft) to 164 centimetres (5.38 ft) in adult body length.
Dalatiidae		Kitefin sharks	7	10	Kitefin sharks are small, under 2 m (6.6 ft) long, and are found worldwide. They have cigar-shaped bodies with narrow heads and rounded snouts. Several species have specialized bioluminescent organs. The term kitefin shark is also used as the common name for the type species of the family, Dalatias licha.
Echinorhinidae		Bramble sharks	1	2	Bramble sharks are usually benthic fish found in tropical and temperate waters worldwide, while the prickly shark is found in the deep waters of the Pacific Ocean. Their usual prey is small fish, cephalopods, and crustaceans. They are ovoviviparous, with the female retaining the egg cases in her body until they hatch. They are relatively large sharks, ranging from 3.1 to 4 metres (10 to 13 ft) in adult body length.
Etmopteridae		Lantern sharks	5	45	Lantern sharks are deepwater fish with light-producing photophores on their bodies. The members of this family are small, under 90 cm (35 in) long, and are found worldwide.
Oxynotidae		Rough sharks	1	5	Rough sharks are characterised by two large dorsal fins, each with a sharp spine, and with the first fin placed far forward above the head. Their bodies are compressed, giving them a triangular cross-section. Their skins are even rougher and more prickly than the dogfishes (below). Rough sharks are small to medium in size, ranging from 49 to 150 centimetres (1.61 to 4.92 ft) in adult body length, depending on species. They are deepwater sharks possessing a luminous organ which live in Atlantic and western Pacific oceans.
Somniosidae		Sleeper sharks	7	20	Sleeper sharks are a poorly studied deep-sea shark found in all oceans. They contain antifreeze to survive in cold temperatures, and may feed on colossal squid. In Iceland, they are hunted for food. They are allowed to rot for months until the poisonous antifreeze degrades, and they are safe to eat.
Squalidae		Dogfish sharks	3	31	Dogfish sharks have two dorsal fins, each with smooth spines, but no anal fin. Their skin is generally rough to the touch. These sharks are characterized by teeth in upper and lower jaws similar in size; caudal peduncle with lateral keels; upper precaudal pit usually present; and a caudal fin without a subterminal notch. Unlike nearly all other shark species, dogfish possess venom, which coats their dorsal spines and is mildly toxic to humans. Their livers and stomachs contain also the compound squalamine, which possesses the property of reduction of small blood vessel growth in humans.
