= Photophore =

Glandular organ that appears as luminous spots on various marine animals

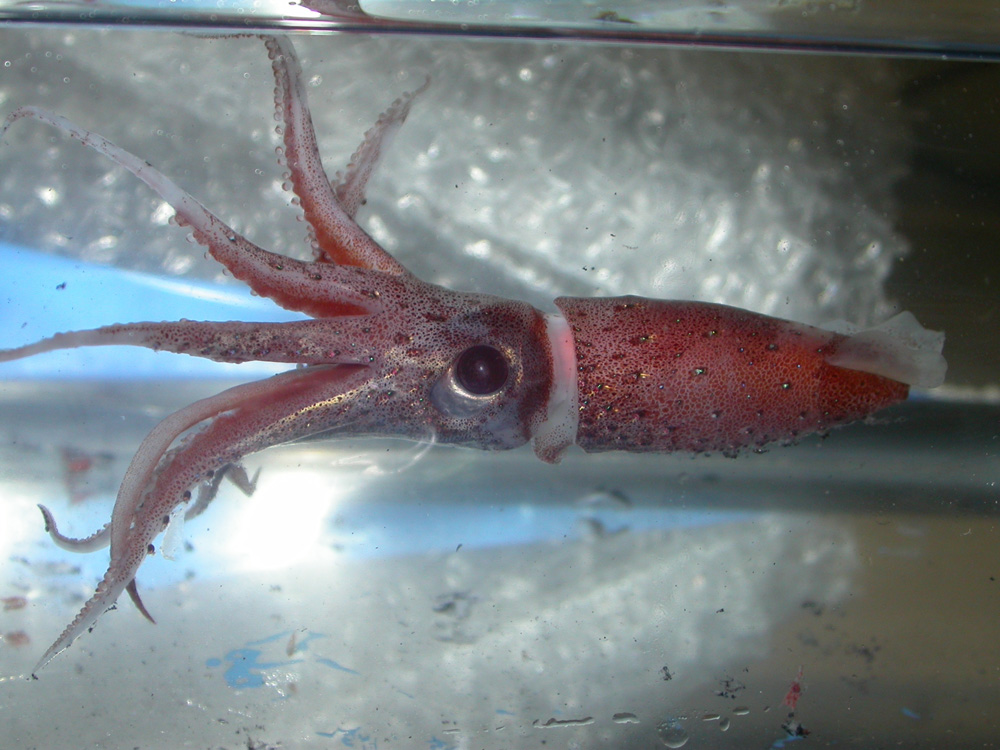
The elongate jewel squid (Histioteuthis reversa), so called because the photophores festooning its body make it appear bejewelled.

Diagram of a cephalopod's photophore, in vertical section.

A photophore is a specialized anatomical structure found in a variety of organisms that emits light through the process of bioluminescence. This light may be produced endogenously by the organism itself (non-symbiotic) or generated through a mutualistic relationship with bioluminescent bacteria (symbiotic), resulting in light production on a glandular organ of animals. Light organs are most commonly found in marine animals, including many species of fish and cephalopods. The organ can be simple, or as complex as the human eye, equipped with lenses, shutters, color filters, and reflectors; unlike an eye, however, it is optimized to produce light, not absorb it.

In the context of developmental biology, light organs form through precise genetic regulation and, in some cases, microbial colonization during specific stages of an organism's life cycle. They play a crucial evolutionary role in enabling species to adapt to low-light or dark environments, particularly in the deep sea.

== Bioluminescent light organs ==
=== Symbiotic light organs ===
==== Marine ====
Symbiotic light organs exist in many species of marine organisms. These light organs are used for various reasons, such as mating, warning predators, and communication. In a lot of marine animals, the photophores are usually along the sides of the body. This is especially true for crustaceans and squids. This placement allows the light to bend around them and contrast with their bodies so they are harder to see by predators.

There are several groups and families of fish that contain symbiotic light organs. Angler fish are a commonly known example of this, as they have a dangling light source that they use for mating and food. Another example, though a predator, includes Dragonfish. This group has photophores on their cheeks that allows them to see red light underwater, helping in the capture of prey.

Some of the fish included in the teleost fish groups fall under this category. The flashlight fish, Anomalopidae, contain luminous bacteria that aid in navigation and predation. Shrimp in the family Oplophoridae use bioluminescent secretions, which are used for mating and deterring predators. The development of the light organ in Squids, specifically the Bobtail squid, differs from general fish light organ development.

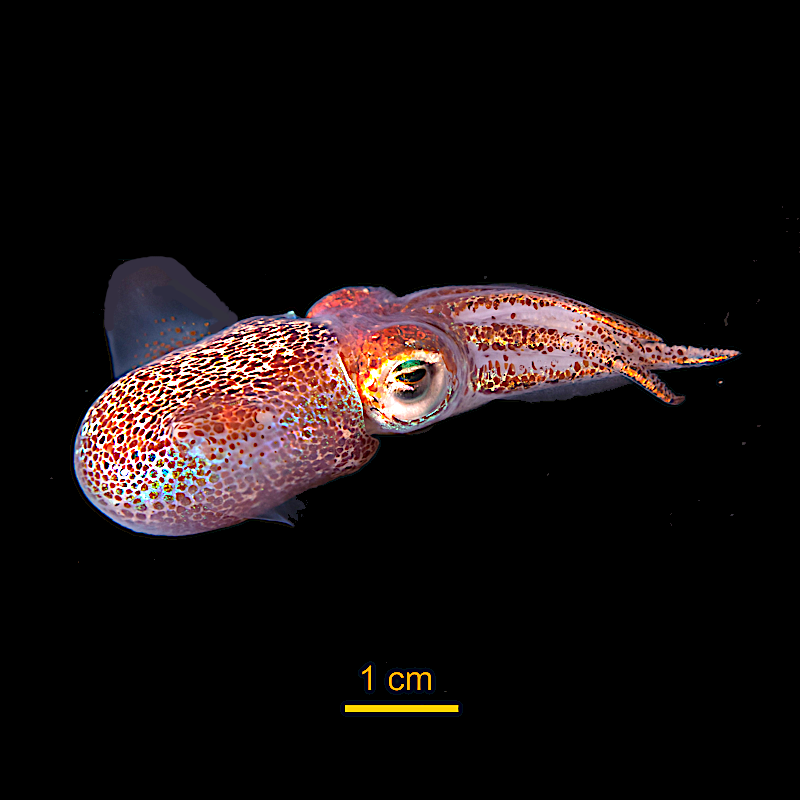
Hawaiian Bobtail Squid, Euprymna scolopes

==== Examples ====
Hawaiian Bobtail Squids, Euprymna scolopes, is a model organism in the study of marine light organ development. Its relationship with Vibrio fischeri has been studied by scientists for its long-term symbiosis and light organ colonization across generations of the organism. The bacteria collects in pores on the sides of the squid light organ, caused by the movement of cilia during the juvenile stage.

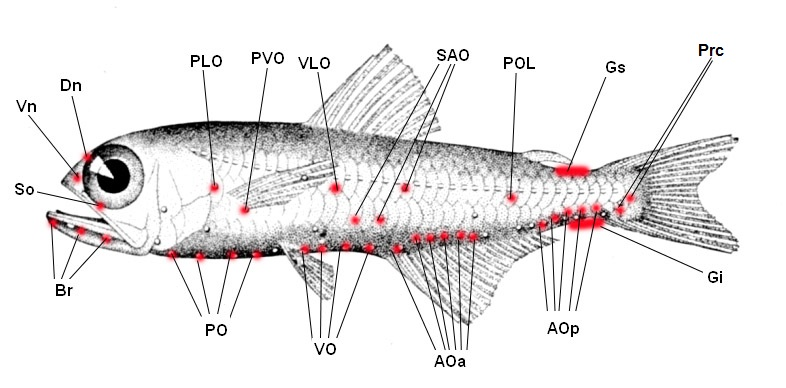
Photophores on a lanternfish

Lanternfish and hatchetfish have photophores that create a pattern on the underside of the animals, causing predators to not see them from below, this is called countershading.

=== Non-symbiotic light organs ===
==== Terrestrial ====
Compared to marine organisms, only a minimal amount of land-based organisms have developed photophores for bioluminescent capabilities. This is likely due to the limited light availability in deeper waters. With the emission of light, aquatic animals have the ability to communicate movement, helping them in mating and distraction of predators.

However, though land animals have greater access to light sources, some species have evolved to benefit from light organs. Organisms such as fungi, insects, and several types of worms exhibit bioluminescent properties. These animals may use their bioluminescence to signal to mates, deter predators when in larval form, attract prey, and much more. Bioluminescent light organs can be located on several parts of the organism including the head region in antenna or mouthpieces, the underside of the organism, or the backside of the organism. Though it is not considered symbiotic, fireflies contain a light organ used primarily for mating. Their bioluminescence comes from the breaking down of luciferin, which is caused by a reaction with oxygen.

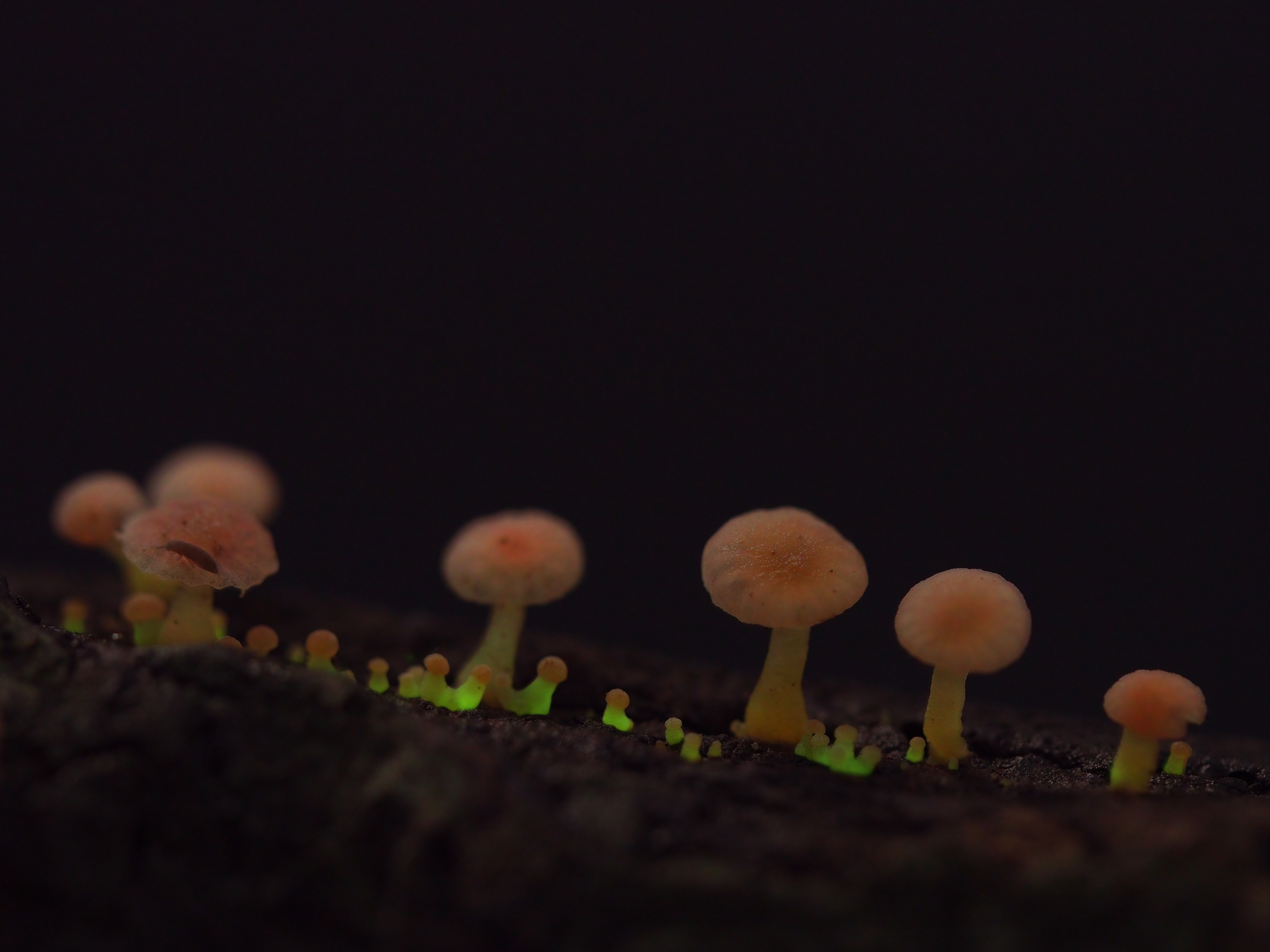
Mycena roseoflava bioluminescent fungi of Basidiomycota

==== Examples ====
Luminous Fungi - Basidiomycetes make up all known bioluminescent fungi, utilizing an enzyme system similar to that of fireflies to emit light. These organisms inhabit subtropical forests and are best identified by the noticeable glow they emit from their wooden substrates. A distinct function for fungi bioluminescence is unknown, however, the benefit of bioluminescence in these organisms is suggested to have significance in metabolism and dispersal. Fungi in the genus Roridomyces have bioluminescent spores that are said to attract mobile terrestrial organisms to disperse the Fungi's reproductive structures.

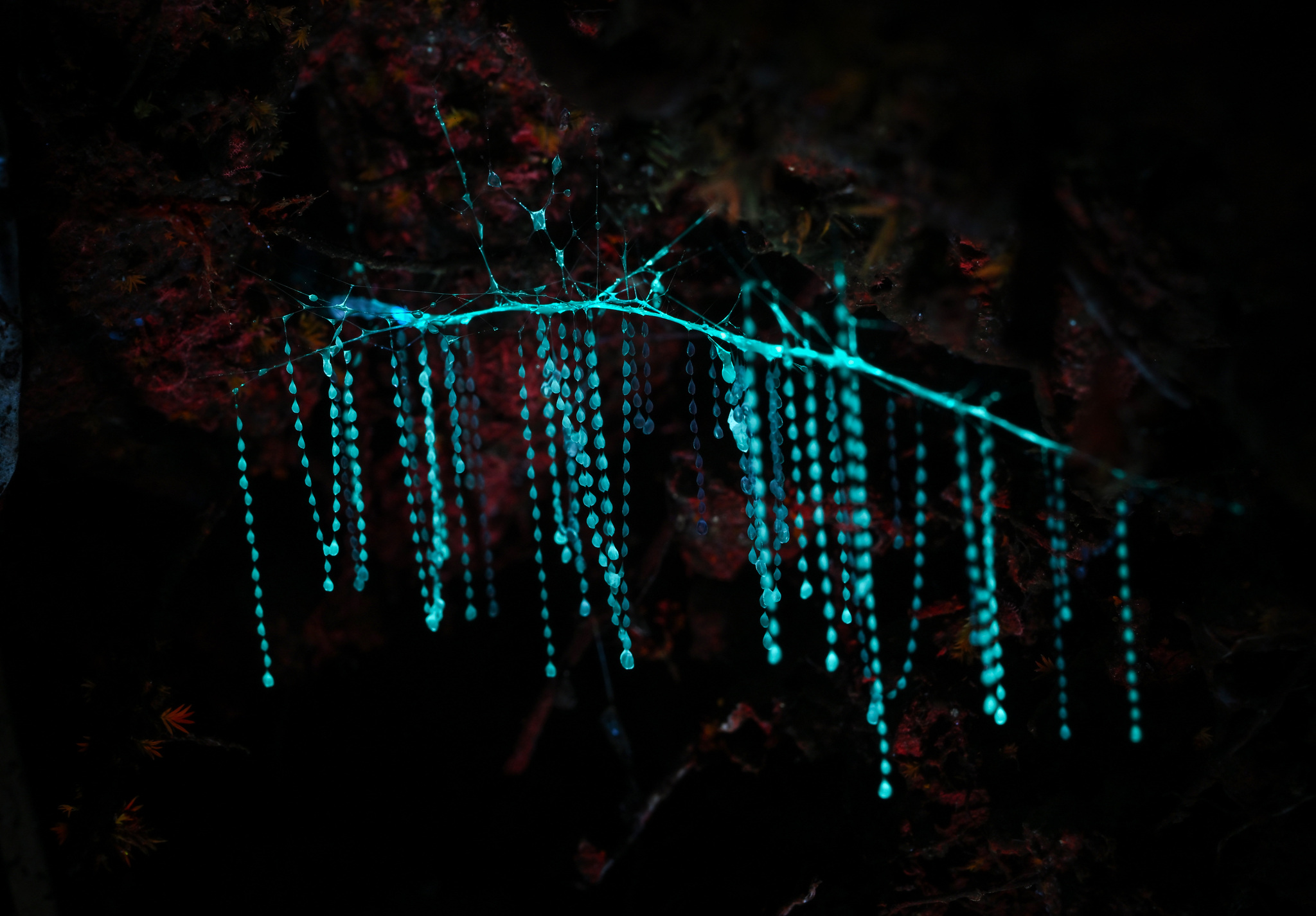
Arachnocampa luminosa bioluminescent web structure

Bioluminescent glow worm - Arachnocampa luminosa uses a similar luciferase mechanism as fireflies to produce a blue colored luminescence. The worms, larvae of fungus gnats, inhabit caves of New Zealand and use web structures illuminated by their bioluminescence to attract prey.

== Organ development ==
Certain light organs will begin development during embryogenesis, with a notable dependence on the homeobox factors AlABD-B and AlUNC-4 which both activate the gene AlLuc1, which is noted by instigating luciferase production. During pupal development for fireflies, the aforementioned genes would be constantly upregulating, or increasing the response intensity to external signals when the organism is developing, whereas other genes like AlAbd-A, which regulates pigmentation, would be actively downregulating, or decreasing the response intensity for this organism, further increasing the activity for bioluminescence.

== Mechanism ==
Reaction mechanism of Luciferin with Luciferase producing visible light.

The bioluminescence can be produced via organs designed to produce light called "photophores". The way that the light gets triggered for production varies among different animals, in animals like the Lampyridae genus, the production of light is triggered indirectly via the nervous system to produce a neurotransmitter called "octopamine", simulating the production of nitric oxide, leading to the production of light.

Photocytes are included in the process of light development, these are specialized cells with the sole purpose of producing light. While some animals contain photocytes, others do not. The Lophiiformes genus, the light that gets produced is via the symbiotic relationship with bioluminescent bacteria, as the animal itself has no ability to produce light.

As with several terrestrial animals, the effect of bioluminescence is a product of the enzyme Luciferase. Luciferase is known to be located in the photophores of the organism. The type of Luciferase enzyme present in these light organs is directly related to the color representation that the photophore cells give off. This distinction can result in blue light, blue-green light, and even red light determined by their wavelengths.

== Applications ==
The development and use of light organs provide various biological advantages and have inspired numerous applications in science and technology. In ecosystems, these organs provide several benefits including camouflage, prey attraction, mating, and predator deterrence. Marine luminescence plays a role in predator-prey relationships in organisms like deep-sea siphonophores, which attract prey through the fluorescence in their tentacles. Similarly, the bobtail squid maintains a symbiotic relationship with the bacterium Vibrio fischeri, which not only contributes to light production, but also plays a role in the proper development of the squid's light organ.

Imaging of engineered E. coli in mouse model showing bioluminescent imaging

Organismal light organs are not only beneficial to animals, but are also useful in the field of medicine, inspiring the use of bioluminescence in research. Genes coding for bioluminescent proteins, such as luciferase, are used as reporters in molecular and cellular biology to monitor gene expression, track cellular processes, and study disease progression in real time. In medical diagnostics, bioluminescent imaging enables non-invasive visualization of infections, tumors, and other biological changes within living organisms.

Bioluminescent organisms and engineered bacteria are also used in environmental monitoring. These systems can detect the presence of harmful pollutants such as heavy metals and organometallic compounds in soil and water by exhibiting a measurable change in light output. In synthetic biology, efforts are ongoing to develop plants and microorganisms with customized bioluminescent capabilities for use in sustainable lighting and biosensing technologies.

=== Future research and applications ===
There are potential uses for bioluminescence in medical and research scenarios. In the past, ATP-driven bioluminescence has been used to detect the presence of plaque producing bacteria such as Streptococcus mutans.

Bioluminescent bacteria also have the potential to disclose of environmental toxins, such as metals and organometallic compounds. Using bacteria that are sensitive to certain types of pollutants in the base parts of the environments, including the presence of metals in water and soil. Detecting these contaminants within the environment has the potential to be beneficial, being informed on the health of the environment sooner allows for measures to be taken earlier than they would have otherwise.

== See also ==
- Bioluminescence
- Chromatophore
- Chromophore, part of a molecule
