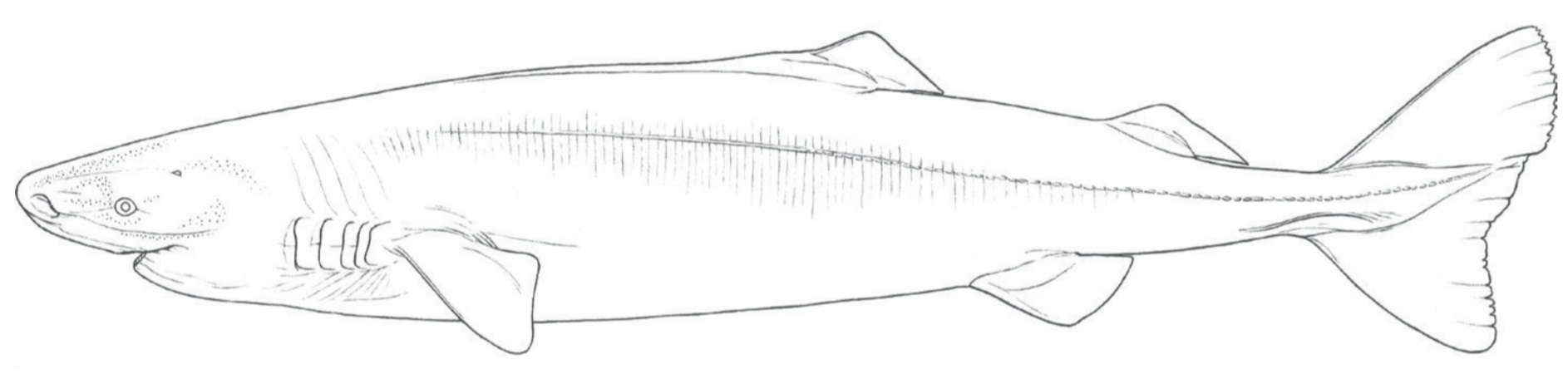

Conservation status
- Near Threatened (IUCN 3.1)

Scientific classification
- Kingdom: Animalia
- Phylum: Chordata
- Class: Chondrichthyes
- Subclass: Elasmobranchii
- Division: Selachii
- Order: Squaliformes
- Family: Somniosidae
- Genus: Somniosus
- Species: S. pacificus

Binomial name
- Somniosus pacificus Bigelow & Schroeder, 1944
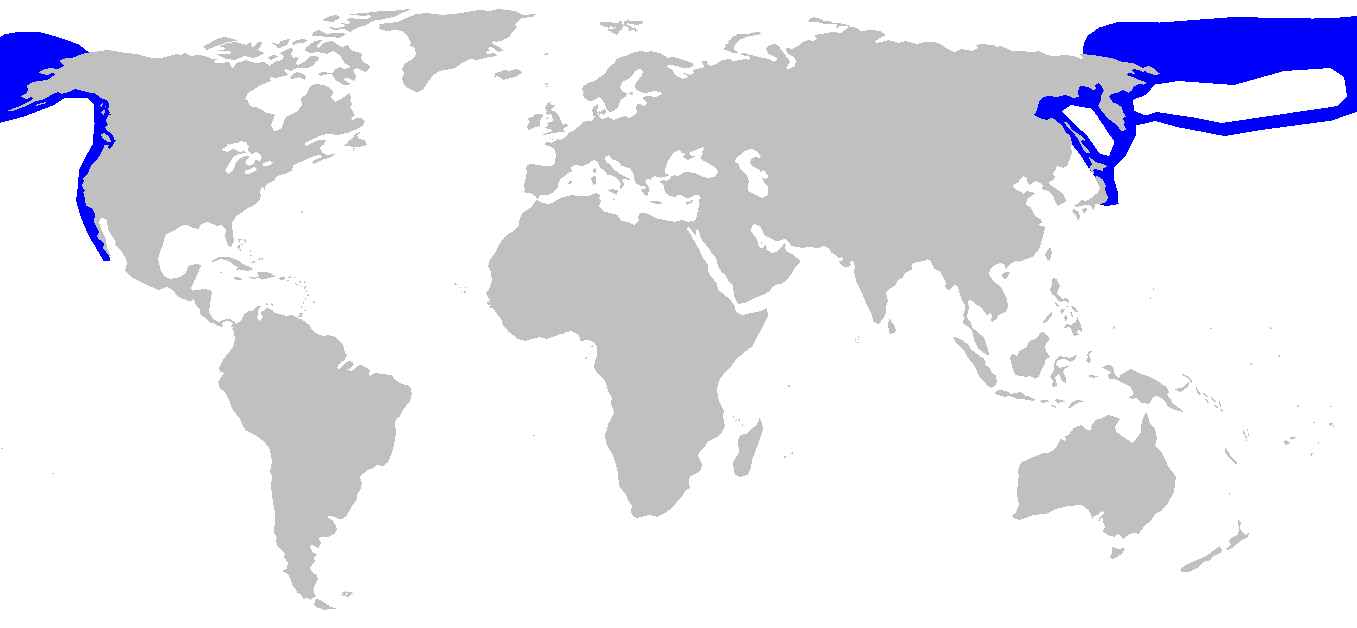
- Range of the Pacific sleeper shark

= Pacific sleeper shark =

Species of shark

The Pacific sleeper shark (Somniosus pacificus) is a shark of the family Somniosidae, the sleeper sharks. While primarily associated with temperate and subarctic waters of the Northern Pacific Ocean, it has been documented in the tropical Pacific and Antarctic Ocean as well. Reaching lengths of 4.65 m (15.3 ft), it is one of the world's largest predatory sharks. It is highly adapted to the extreme temperature and pressures of the deep-sea, including specialized liver oils and high concentrations of urea and trimethylamine oxide for survival. The sleeper shark has a sluggish reputation, but is also a versatile hunter and scavenger that migrates vertically. Due to its slow growth and vulnerability to fishing bycatch, it is currently classified as Near Threatened by the International Union for Conservation of Nature (IUCN).

== Taxonomy and Evolution ==
Pacific sleeper shark is one of the five species of the genus Somniosus, other species included the Greenland shark, southern, little, and the recently described Taiwan sleeper shark. Somniosus was part of family, Somniosidae, which was part of an order of sharks known as Squaliformes. Somniosus diverged from other somniosids and Oxynotidae, roughly 92.29 Ma. The oldest Somniosus species appeared in the latest Early Oligocene.

Greenland shark and Pacific sleeper sharks likely split off from each other between 0.9 to 2.34 Ma, which may have been the result of the onset of the Pleistocene, which increased speciation of sleeper sharks in the Northern Hemisphere.

== Description ==
The average mature size of this species is 3.65 m (12.0 ft) and 318–363 kg (701–800 lb). The heaviest Pacific sleeper shark measured 4.4 m (14 ft) long and weighed 888 kg (1,958 lb). The longest known Pacific sleeper shark was caught 4.65 m (15.3 ft), although it could possibly reach 7 m (23 ft) or more. An enormous Pacific sleeper shark was attracted to a bait in deep water outside Tokyo Bay, Japan, and filmed in 1989. The shark was estimated by Eugenie Clark to be about 7 m (23 ft) long.

A single unconfirmed account exists of an enormous Pacific sleeper shark that potentially measured more than 9.2 m (30 ft) long. If true, this would make the species the longest extant macro-predatory shark, and the third largest shark overall after the whale shark and the basking shark. Similar to the Greenland shark, the parasitic copepod Ommatokoita elongata can often be observed consuming the shark's corneal tissue, which degrades their eyesight.

=== Adaptations ===
Due to living in frigid depths, the sleeper shark's liver oil does not contain squalene, which would solidify into a dense, nonbuoyant mass. Instead, the low-density compounds in the sharks' liver are diacylglyceryl ethers and triacylglycerol, which maintain their fluidity even at the lowest temperatures. They also store very little urea in their skin (like many deep sea sharks), but like other elasmobranchs, have high concentrations of urea and trimethylamine oxide (nitrogenous waste products) within their tissues as osmoprotectants and to increase their buoyancy. Trimethylamine oxide also serves to counteract the protein-destabilizing tendencies of urea and pressure. Its presence in the tissues of both elasmobranch and teleost fish has been found to increase with depth.

Because food is relatively scarce on the deep sea floor, the sleeper shark is able to store food in its capacious stomach. The sleeper shark's jaws are able to produce a powerful bite due to their short and transverse shape. The upper jaw teeth of the sleeper shark are spike-like, while the lower jaw teeth consist of oblique cusps and overlapping bases. This arrangement allows grasping and sawing of food too large to swallow. Pacific sleeper sharks have a short caudal fin, which allows them to store energy for fast and violent bursts of energy to catch prey.

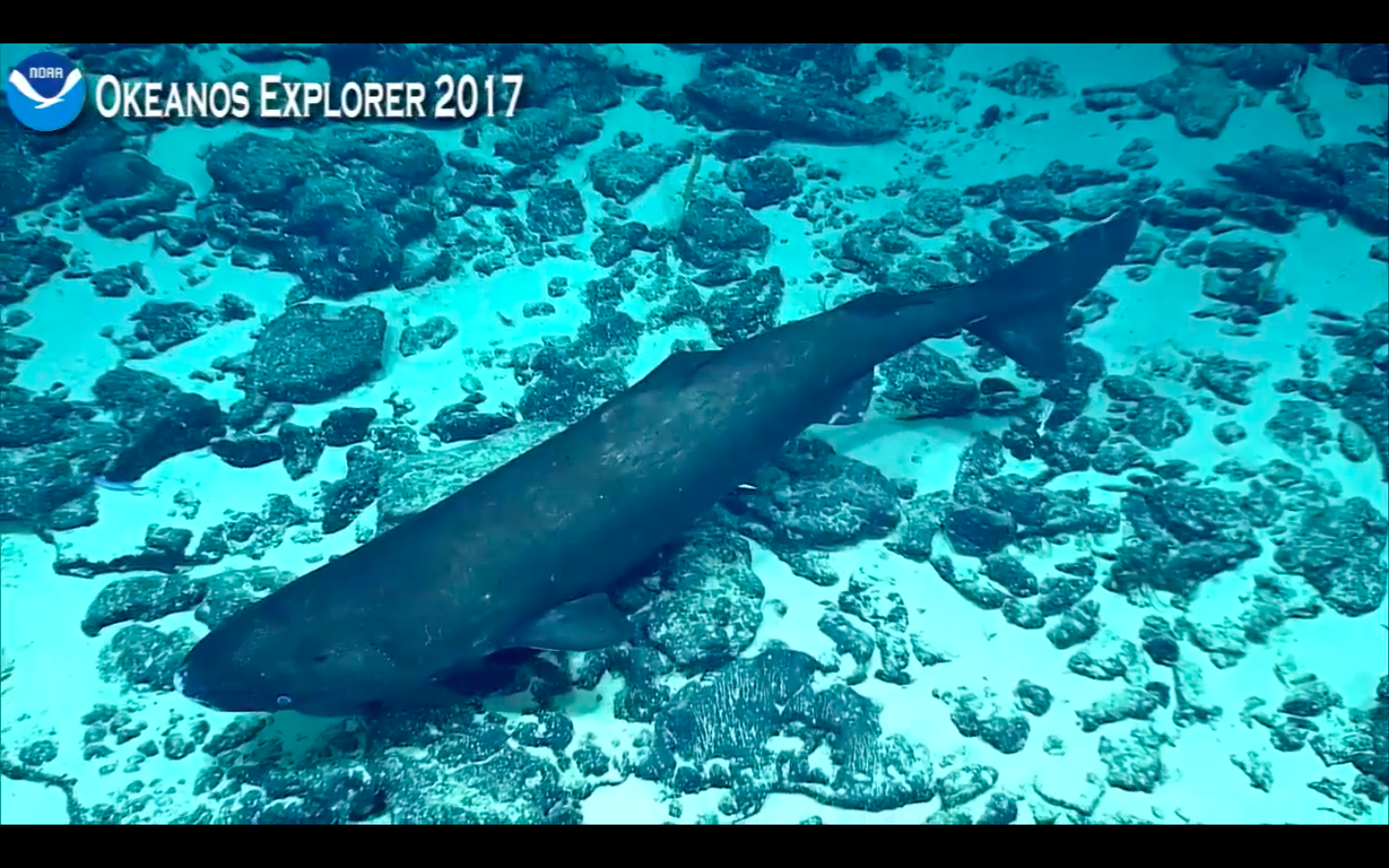
Underwater footage of Somniosus pacificus

== Distribution ==
The Pacific sleeper shark is found in the North Pacific on continental shelves and slopes in Arctic and temperate waters between latitudes 70°N and 22°N and in at least two places in the western tropical Pacific near Palau and the Solomon Islands, from the surface to 2,000 metres (6,600 ft) deep. The first evidence of the sharks in the western tropical Pacific emerged from a National Geographic video taken near the Solomon Islands in 2015.

The Pacific Sleeper shark inhabits in temperate and subarctic waters of the North Pacific Ocean, including offshore regions of California. Tagging studies done from 2019 to 2022 indicate that these sharks indicate moderate regional movements, with certain individuals traveling 3.9-145.1 meters from tagging sites over 31 say periods. The species primarily occupies mesopelagic depths. Tracked sharks ranged from 106–1,323m but spent more than 99% of their time between 200-600m, most commonly at 300-500m. Depth use was slightly greater during the day than at night. Recorded temperatures occupied depths ranged from 3.3 °C-11.0 °C.

In 2015 a Pacific sleeper shark was also recorded in the Tonga Trench, filmed in 2024.

=== Vertical movements ===
Pacific sleeper sharks exhibit extensive vertical migration patterns throughout the deep sea. This species practices systematic vertical oscillations, meaning descension and ascension that is methodical and lacks a transitional pause. They also perform irregular vertical movements and Diel vertical migration. This Diel vertical migration corresponds to hunting strategies characterized by approach of the surface at nighttime and travel down to the depths below the photic zone at night. This alludes to a cyclic and crepuscular pattern of movement. These vertical oscillations assist in the search for prey by Pacific sleeper sharks that also employ ambush, stealth, and cryptic coloration to hunt for prey. The median daily depth range of this species in the north-east Pacific Ocean has been found to be 184m, with the majority of time being spent in the ranged of 150 and 450m, though it is common for these sharks to ascend above 100m. The rate of vertical movement is described at a steady 6 km per day. The median depth changes per-minute are measured at between 4 and 6 meters per minute, while the higher speeds of vertical migration were approximately 40 to 41 meters per minute. The up-and-down pattern of swimming in Pacific sleeper sharks is a common characteristic of epipelagic shark species and is related to food finding or foraging in the deep sea environment.

One study examined the stomachs of 25 Pacific sleeper sharks, demonstrating that these sharks attain their diet from both the bottom and in the water column. These sharks perform vertical migration to feed.

=== Seasonal movements ===
The average depth for these sharks seems to vary depending on the season. One study found that Pacific sleeper sharks in the Bering Sea resided at a larger average depth in colder seasons than warmer seasons. From December to February, their average depths are from 473 to 540 meters. From May to July, their average depths are from 290 to 330 meters. This study did not find any seasonal changes in the horizontal displacement of Pacific sleeper sharks throughout the year.

== Biology ==
=== Trophic ecology ===
Pacific sleeper sharks are thought to be both predators and scavengers. They can glide through the water with little body movement and little hydrodynamic noise, making them successful stealth predators. They feed by means of suction and cutting of their prey, possessing large mouths that can essentially inhale prey, with their teeth cut up any pieces that are too large to swallow.They show a characteristic rolling motion of the head when feeding. Since they lack a nictitating membrane that other sharks have, they roll their eyes back in their sockets to protect them from thrashing prey. Predation on Pacific sleepers sharks by the offshore ecotype of killer whale has been documented in British Columbia.

=== Diet and prey ===
Pacific sleeper sharks are a generalist predator species. A recent study of Pacific Sleeper Shark diet revealed that their primary prey are teleosts and cephalopods. Fast-swimming fish are most commonly consumed, such as Pacific salmon and albacore tuna, but they are generalist and known to consume other organisms too.

Diet of Pacific sleeper sharks is location dependent. In Northwest Pacific populations of this species, common prey found in the stomachs of these animals often includes chum salmon, walleye pollock, popeye grenadier (Coryphaenoides cinereus), giant grenadier (Albatrossia pectoralis), red squid (Berryteuthis magister), and Kamchatka flounders. In populations located in the Gulf of Alaska, prey discovered in the stomachs of these animals included walleye pollock, Giant Pacific octopus, arrowtooth flounder, and Pacific salmon.

The diet of the Pacific sleeper shark also may differ as they increase in body size. For example, a 3.7-m female shark found off Trinidad, California, was found to have fed mostly on giant squid. Sleeper sharks found in Alaskan waters from 2 to 3 m (6.6 to 9.8 ft) seem to feed mostly on flounder, pollock, and cephalopods, while sleeper sharks 3.3 to 4.25 m (10.8 to 13.9 ft) long seem to consume teleosts and cephalopods, as well as marine mammals. A recent study in the Gulf of Alaska suggests that sleeper sharks may prey on juvenile Steller sea lions. Alaskan populations often feed on the giant Pacific octopus. These are also known to feed on bottom-dwelling fish, such as soles, flounders, Alaska pollock, rockfishes, along with shrimps, hermit crabs, and even marine snails. Larger Pacific sleeper sharks are also found to feed on fast-swimming prey, such as squids, Pacific salmon, and harbor porpoises.

=== Reproduction ===
Very little is known about the early life of Pacific sleeper sharks. They are believed to produce eggs that hatch inside the female's body (being ovoviviparous), but gestation time is unknown. Mothers can carry up to 300 eggs but only about 10% of these eggs fully develop into embryos. Male sharks have external reproductive organs called claspers which are hypothesized to be inserted into the cloaca of the female with whom they are mating. Its length at birth is about 42 cm (1.38 ft) or less and tend to exhibit a lighter skin color than adults. Pacific sleeper sharks reach sexual maturity once they exceed about 3.5 m (11 ft).

== Human interaction and fisheries ==
Although the Pacific sleeper shark is not a target for fisheries, it often gets captured as bycatch due to its large size and wide distribution throughout the North Pacific. These accidental interactions have become an increasing conservation concern. Recently, the International Union for Conservation of Nature has changed the specie's status on the IUCN Red List from Data Deficient to Near Threatened because of its vulnerability to fishing pressure and evidence of regional population declines.

Historically, Pacific sleeper sharks have not been specifically targeted by commercial fisheries. The only documented directed fishery occurred off Hualien, Taiwan. There are some anecdotal reports that some fishers in Southeast Alaska targeted the species for its liver during the short popularity of shark liver fishery, yet there are no official records of it. Although rare, when Pacific sleeper sharks are targeted, their commercially valuable parts include the liver, fin, and jaws. This practice has threatened many shark species with population declines and potential extinction.

Pacific sleeper sharks live in the bottom portion of the water column, leading to their incidental capture when fisheries target groundfish species. Bottom trawl and longline fisheries account for the majority of captures. In federal waters off Alaska, the species is frequently caught by commercial fisheries targeting walleye pollock, Pacific halibut, flatfish, and Pacific cod. The species is also occasionally caught in recreational fisheries for halibut and other bottom fish. Along the U.S. West coast and the British Columbia coast, nearly all individuals caught are released back into the ocean. However, the survival rate of the released individuals in uncertain and varies depending on the fishing gear used as well as handling practices.

Interactions with fishing gear can also cause operational issues for fishers. Observations from 11 fishing vessels since 2015 reported 57 captured Pacific sleeper sharks. Of those 57, about 26.3% became entangled in fishing lines, and 10.5% required more than three minutes to disentangle. In over 60% of these cases, fishers had to cut the shark in order to remove it from the longline gear. Sharks caught on longlines often remain attached to hooks embedded in their jaws. It is unclear whether fishers cut the lines intentionally, or if the gear breaks under the shark's weight.

In bottom trawl fisheries in the western Bering Sea, Pacific sleeper sharks can be caught in large numbers, Individual trawls have occasionally captured up to 100 sleeper sharks, demonstrating the species local abundance. Survey data from the western Bering Sea showed that the density of Pacific sleeper sharks increased from approximately 10.8 individuals per square kilometer between 1982 and 1990 to 27.7 individuals per square kilometers between 1991 and 1995. Biomass estimates rose from approximately 1,170 metric tons in 1999 to 87,500 metric tons by 2002.

Despite their increase in regional abundance, the biological characteristics of Pacific sleeper sharks make them vulnerable to overfishing. As a member of the Elasmobranchii, it exhibits slow growth rate, late sexual maturity, and relatively low reproductive rates. In the northwestern Pacific Ocean, most individuals captured in fisheries measured between 120 and 170 cm in length. Because sexual maturity occurs at lengths exceeding 350 cm, most captured individuals are immature. Commercial fisheries usually operate at depths less than 1,000 meters, and mature sharks inhabit deeper waters. This depth separation may provide some protection for the breeding population of Pacific sleeper sharks.

== See also ==
- Greenland shark
- List of sharks
