= The Most Extreme =

- Title card
- Genre: Nature documentary, edutainment
- Developed by: Shelby Wilson
- Narrated by: Adam Harrington
- Country of origin: United States
- Original language: English
- No. of seasons: 5
- No. of episodes: 77

Production
- Producer: Ian McGee
- Running time: 46 minutes
- Production company: NHNZ Ltd

Original release
- Network: Animal Planet
- Release: July 7, 2002 – July 3, 2007

The Most Extreme is a documentary television series on the American cable television network Animal Planet. It first aired on July 7, 2002. Each episode focuses on a specific animal feature, such as strength, speed, behavior, anatomy, or diet, and examines and ranks ten animals which portray extreme or unusual examples of that quality. Along with each animal on the countdown, all episodes present an animated segment which compares the animal's ability to something equivalent in humans, followed by interviews with people who share a common trait. Old, often public domain, cartoons, movie clips and trailers are typically included.

== Episodes ==
"Earth is a planet of extremes. Extreme places, and extreme animals. But some animals are more extreme than others. Join us as we count down to find the most unusual, and the most extraordinary, on Animal Planet's The Most Extreme."

— Opening of the show.

The show was narrated by Adam J. Harrington. On Animal Planet, the episodes were also announced by Simon Arnstein.

=== Season 1 ===
#	Original airdate	Title	Overview	Animal that was Number 1
1	30 June 2002	Jumpers	The fastest, highest and best jumpers.	Flea
2	30 June 2002	Gluttons	The greediest eaters in the world.	Caterpillar
3	7 July 2002	Speed	The fastest animals on land, air and water.	Tiger beetle
4	14 July 2002	Births	Extreme reproduction in number of young, size and other factors.	Tapeworm
5	21 July 2002	Cheats	The ways animals trick one another.	Cuckoo
6	28 July 2002	Survivors	The animals who best survive extreme conditions.	Water bear
7	18 August 2002	Builders	The animal kingdom's most innovative construction engineers.	Termite
8	25 August 2002	Horrors	The animals that inspire the most terror in humans.	Parasitic worm
9	1 September 2002	Fighters	Warriors of the animal kingdom.	Ant
10	27 October 2002	Strength	Proportionally, the strongest animals in the world.	Rhinoceros beetle
11	3 November 2002	Biters	The deadliest, most prolific and most extreme bites.	Cookiecutter shark
12	10 November 2002	Thinkers	Geniuses in the animal kingdom.	Parrot
13	17 November 2002	Lovers	Most extreme courtship rituals.	Redback Spider

=== Season 2 ===
#	Original airdate	Title	Overview	Animal that was Number 1
14	11 May 2003	Moms	Mothers with the heaviest, hardest or most unusual jobs on the planet.	Sea louse
15	15 June 2003	Dads	Fathers in the wild will go to extremes to take care of their young.	Seahorse
16	22 June 2003	Venom	Animals with the most lethal venomous bites or stings.	Box jellyfish
17	29 June 2003	Disguise	These animals are experts at pretending to be what they are not.	Mimic octopus
18	6 July 2003	Swarms	Hordes in the animal kingdom numbering millions and even billions of individuals.	Argentine ant
19	7 September 2003	Body Parts	Animals with relatively large body parts.	Giraffe
20	14 September 2003	Predators	The most efficient hunters come in many sizes.	Shrew
21	21 September 2003	Stinkers	The worst-smelling animals, including one with a stench that kills.	Skunk
22	28 September 2003	Super Senses	The world's best at keeping up with their environments.	Shark
23	23 November 2003	Eaters	Animals with the most unusual menus.	Vulture
24	30 November 2003	Daredevils	Top stuntmen of the natural kingdom.	Barnacle goose
25	7 December 2003	Defenders	The best and most unusual self-protectors.	Bee
26	21 December 2003	Oddities	Strange animals and their human equivalents.	Deep-sea anglerfish

=== Season 3 ===
#	Original airdate	Title	Overview	Animal that was Number 1
27	3 August 2004	Gross-Outs	The most disgusting behavior in the wild.	Fly
28	10 August 2004	Home Designers	The most extreme, unusual and innovative animal architects.	Termite
29	7 September 2004	Tough Babies	The strongest babies in the animal kingdom, with human comparisons.	Sand tiger shark
30	14 September 2004	Wild Partiers	How the most extreme partiers in the wild compare to human parties.	Christmas Island red crab
31	21 September 2004	Monster Myths	The reality behind some of the most feared animals in the world.	Wolf
-	25 September 2004	The Best of the Best	Retroactive examination of Number 1s from earlier episodes, with a countdown to the most extreme among them.	Cookiecutter shark (from Biters)
32	12 October 2004	Killer Cats	The most ferocious felines in the world.	House cat
33	19 October 2004	Battle of the Sexes	Males and females of animals in which the two sexes have very little in common with one another and are not always good for each other's health.	Whiptail lizard
34	23 November 2004	Big Mouths	Proportionally, the 10 largest mouths in the world.	Argentine horned frog
35	30 November 2004	Deadly Snakes	The most venomous, dangerous and prolific killer snakes.	Cobra
36	14 December 2004	Killers	The animals with the highest human kill counts.	Mosquito
37	8 February 2005	Bloodsuckers	Vampires in the animal kingdom.	Tick
38	15 February 2005	Super Sharks	The "highest tech" sharks in the ocean.	Hammerhead shark
39	22 February 2005	Poison	The deadliest chemical defenses.	Golden poison frog
40	1 March 2005	Super Dogs	The 10 dog breeds that have evolved the furthest from their wolf ancestor.	Chihuahua
41	8 March 2005	Global Conquerors	The most invasive animal species.	Cockroach
42	15 March 2005	Outrageous Flirts	The unusual ways that animals attract one another.	Elephant
43	27 April 2005	Athletes	The most athletic animals and their human equivalents.	Arctic tern
44	4 May 2005	Odd Couples	When two kinds unite: unexpected animal partnerships.	Greenland shark/Ommatokoita
45	25 May 2005	Movers	The animals that move the best with the fewest limbs for movement.	Scallop
46	1 June 2005	Troublemakers	The animals that cause the most trouble for humans just by doing what they do.	Termite

=== Season 4 ===
#	Original airdate	Title	Overview	Animal that was Number 1
47	25 October 2005	Hissy Fits	The worst temper tantrums in the animal world.	Elephant
48	1 November 2005	Living Dead	Not actual zombies, these extreme animals can play dead or, when dormant, can appear to come back from the dead.	Water bear
49	8 November 2005	Divers	The animals that can hold their breaths the longest or dive the relative deepest.	Sperm Whale
50	29 November 2005	Dieters	Some animals can eat a lot without gaining weight, while others can go for long times between meals.	Tick
51	24 January 2006	Loudmouths	The world's loudest animals.	Pistol shrimp
52	2 February 2006	Appendages	The most unusual animal attachments.	Anglerfish
53	7 March 2006	Transformers	Ten transformers capable of altering themselves in extreme ways.	Ribeiroia
54	14 March 2006	Fashion Disasters	Animals whose appearances can put them in danger.	Deer
55	21 March 2006	City Slickers	Animals best adapted to life in human urban environments.	Macaque
56	28 March 2006	Workaholics	The hardest-working animals in the natural world.	Honey bee
57	25 April 2006	Slime Balls	Animals that have found the most innovative ways to use slime.	Banana slug
58	2 May 2006	Animal Myths	The most misunderstood animals.	Lemming
59	6 June 2006	Gourmets	Animals that put time and effort into their food preparation.	Honey bee
60	13 June 2006	Diggers	Most extreme cavity makers.	Termite
61	20 June 2006	Weird Weapons	The strangest ways animals defend themselves or attack.	Electric eel
62	26 September 2006	Cleaners	Nature's most unusual neat-freaks.	Japanese macaque
63	3 October 2006	Pirates	Animals who act like pirates, taking from others or hunting for treasure.	Amazon ant
64	10 October 2006	Gardeners	The unusual ways that animals impact vegetable growth.	Lemon ant
65	17 October 2006	Freeloaders	Opportunistic animals that gain benefits by associating with others.	Tapeworm
66	24 October 2006	Awesome Ancestors	Prehistoric animals larger than their modern descendants/relatives.	Megatherium

=== Season 5 ===
#	Original airdate	Title	Overview	Animal that was Number 1
67	24 April 2007	Inventors	Innovative tools nature-built right into an animal's body.	Wood frog
68	1 May 2007	Night Lights	The brightest animals in the wild.	Deep-sea anglerfish
69	8 May 2007	Leaders	Animals with extreme numbers of followers.	Termite
70	15 May 2007	Medics	The unusual ways some animals self-treat themselves.	Axolotl
71	22 May 2007	Freaky Fliers	Animals with unusual ways of moving through the air.	Spider
72	5 June 2007	Bodysnatchers	Animals that take over the bodies of others.	Toxoplasma
73	12 June 2007	Gadgets	The animals which create/use the most tools.	Chimpanzee
74	19 June 2007	Psychics	Animals that seem to predict the future.	Ladybird beetle
75	26 June 2007	Dirty Jobs	The "jobs" of animals that are the most revolting.	Dung beetle
76	3 July 2007	Crazy Collectors	The most obsessive hoarders in the wild.	Pack rat
