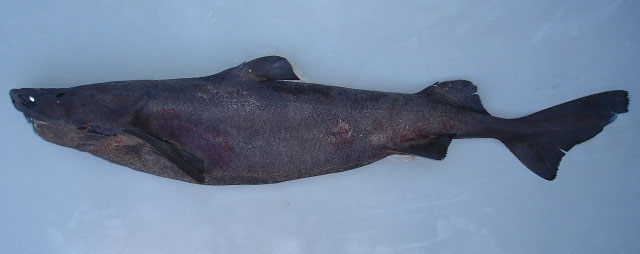

Conservation status
- Vulnerable (IUCN 3.1)

Scientific classification
- Kingdom: Animalia
- Phylum: Chordata
- Class: Chondrichthyes
- Subclass: Elasmobranchii
- Division: Selachii
- Order: Squaliformes
- Family: Somniosidae
- Genus: Scymnodon
- Species: S. macracanthus

Binomial name
- Scymnodon macracanthus Regan, 1906

Synonyms
- Centroscymnus macracanthus Regan, 1906; Proscymnodon macracanthus Regan, 1906

= Largespine velvet dogfish =

Species of fish

The largespine velvet dogfish (Scymnodon macracanthus) is a shark of the family Somniosidae, found on the lower continental slopes between latitudes 50°S and 54°S in the southeast Pacific Ocean from the Straits of Magellan, and the southwest Pacific from New Zealand, at depths of between 650 and 920 m (2,130 and 3,020 ft). Its length is up to 68 cm (27 in). It was originally in the genus Centroscymnus because of the shape of its dermal denticles and dorsal fin spines but some argued to put it in the genus Scymnodon because of its shape of dermal denticles. While some wanted to allocate these in Centroscymnus because of the shape of its lower teeth but later it was allocated to a distinct genus called Proscymnodon.

== Conservation status ==
The New Zealand Department of Conservation has classified the largespine velvet dogfish as "Not Threatened" with the qualifier "Uncertain whether Threatened Overseas" under the New Zealand Threat Classification System.
