= Somniosus gonzalezi =

Somniosus gonzalezi Temporal range: 28.4–23.03 Ma

Scientific classification
- Domain: Eukaryota
- Kingdom: Animalia
- Phylum: Chordata
- Class: Chondrichthyes
- Subclass: Elasmobranchii
- Division: Selachii
- Order: Squaliformes
- Family: Somniosidae
- Genus: Somniosus
- Species: †S. gonzalezi

Binomial name
- †Somniosus gonzalezi Welton & Goedert, 2016

Extinct species of shark

Somniosus gonzalezi is an extinct species of sleeper shark that lived during the Oligocene epoch Rupelian to Chattian stages. The species was described from teeth fossils found in the Pysht Formation of Washington states Olympic Peninsula.
