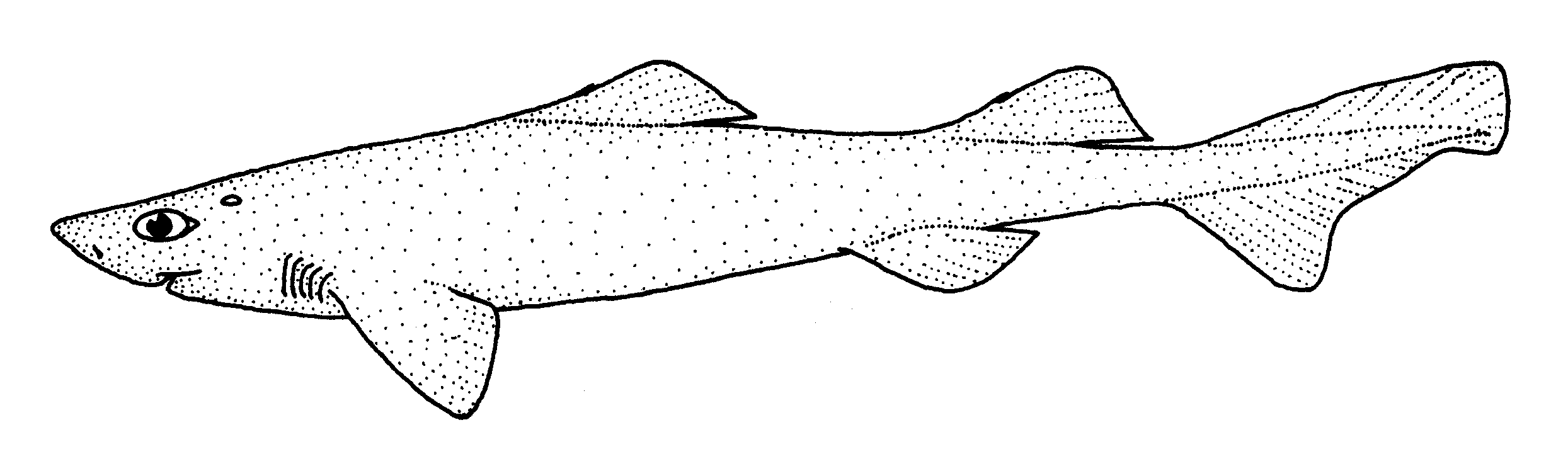
- Scymnodon plunketi
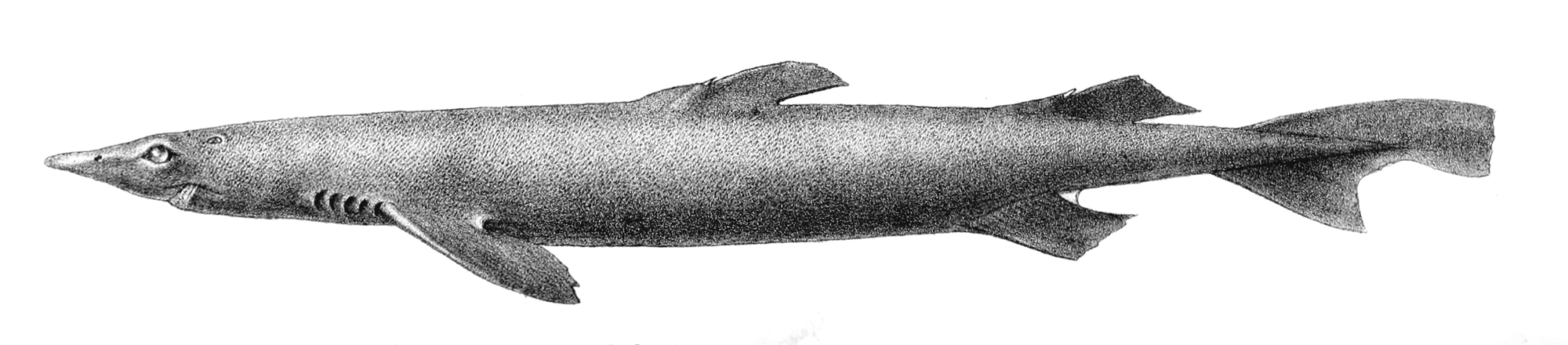
- Scymnodon obscurus

Scientific classification
- Kingdom: Animalia
- Phylum: Chordata
- Class: Chondrichthyes
- Subclass: Elasmobranchii
- Division: Selachii
- Order: Squaliformes
- Family: Somniosidae
- Genus: Scymnodon; Barbosa du Bocage & Brito Capello, 1864

Synonyms
- Proscymnodon Barbosa du Bocage & Brito Capello, 1864

= Scymnodon =

Genus of sharks

Scymnodon is a genus of squaliform sharks in the family Somniosidae.

== Species ==
There are currently [when?] four recognized species in this genus:

- Scymnodon ichiharai Ka. Yano & S. Tanaka (II), 1984 (Japanese velvet dogfish)
- Scymnodon macracanthus (Regan, 1906) (largespine velvet dogfish)
- Scymnodon plunketi (Waite, 1910) (Plunket's shark)
- Scymnodon ringens Barbosa du Bocage & Brito Capello, 1864 (knifetooth dogfish)
