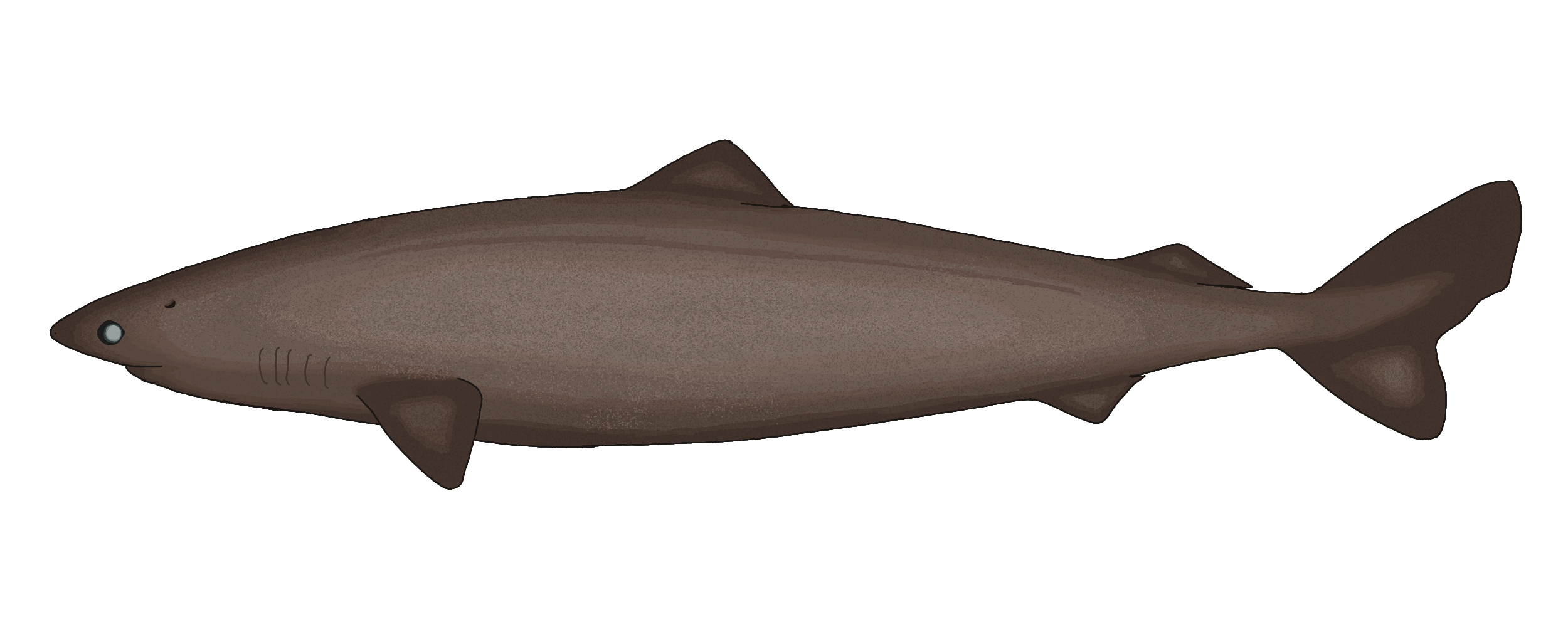

Conservation status
- Data Deficient (IUCN 3.1)

Scientific classification
- Kingdom: Animalia
- Phylum: Chordata
- Class: Chondrichthyes
- Subclass: Elasmobranchii
- Division: Selachii
- Order: Squaliformes
- Family: Somniosidae
- Genus: Somniosus
- Species: S. longus

Binomial name
- Somniosus longus S. Tanaka (I), 1912

Synonyms
- Heteroscymnus longus Tanaka, 1912

= Frog shark =

Species of shark

The frog shark (Somniosus longus) is a very rare species of squaliform shark mainly found in deep water in the Pacific Ocean. It is in the sleeper shark family Somniosidae, along with the Greenland shark.

== Description ==
The frog shark is known to grow to a maximum length of 110 cm (43 in) in males and 130 cm (51 in) in females. Previously classified in the same taxon as the similar Somniosus rostratus, it is differentiated from S. rostratus in having a longer second dorsal fin, a slightly larger eye, more rows of teeth and a greater spiral valve count.

== Range ==
Fewer than a dozen specimens of this deepwater shark have been collected, mostly from the Pacific Ocean. The frog shark has been recorded off the coasts of Japan, New Zealand, and possibly Salas y Gómez, as well as the Nazca Ridge, from as shallow as 120–150 m and as deep as 1,116 m.

== Threats ==
The frog shark is occasionally caught by trawl, longline, and crab pot fisheries. As of 2015, no current conservation efforts are in place. In June 2018 the New Zealand Department of Conservation classified the frog shark as "Data Deficient" with the qualifier "Uncertain whether Secure Overseas" under the New Zealand Threat Classification System.
