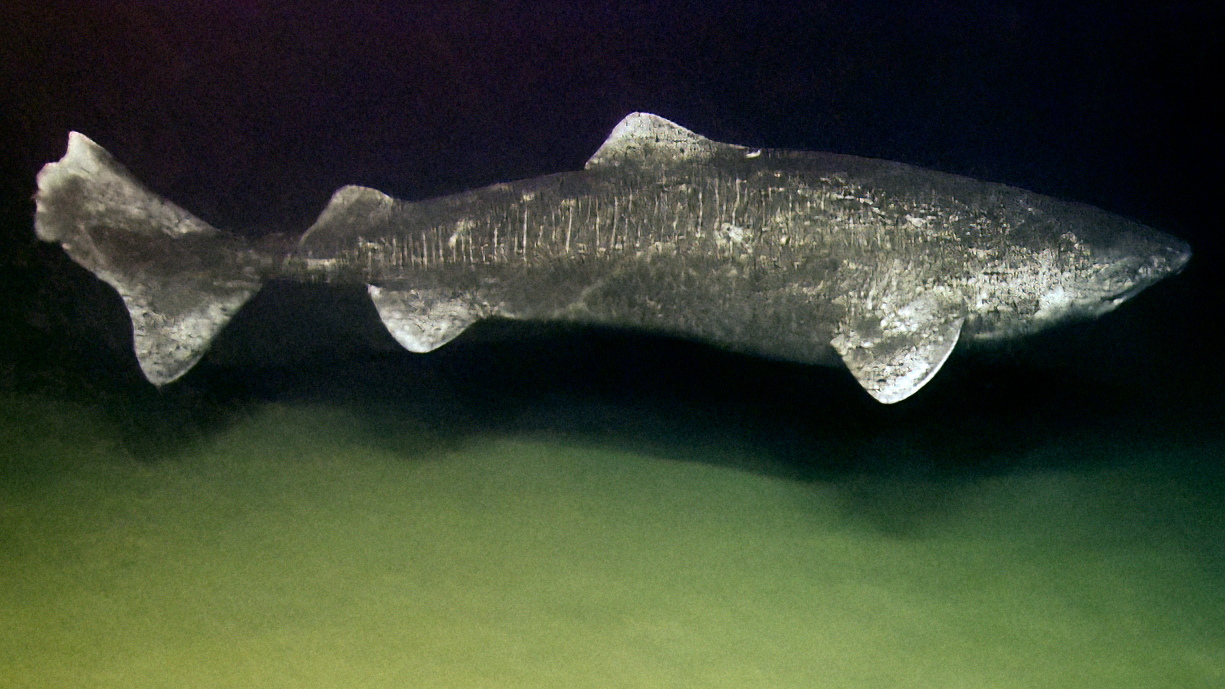
- Somniosus microcephalus

Scientific classification
- Kingdom: Animalia
- Phylum: Chordata
- Class: Chondrichthyes
- Subclass: Elasmobranchii
- Division: Selachii
- Order: Squaliformes
- Family: Somniosidae; D. S. Jordan, 1888

Diversity
- 6 genera, 20 species; See text.

= Somniosidae =

Sleeper sharks Temporal range: Late Cretaceous–Present, 92.29–0 Ma

Family of sharks

The Somniosidae are a family of sharks in the order Squaliformes, commonly known as sleeper sharks. The common name "sleeper shark" comes from their slow swimming, low activity level, and perceived non-aggressive nature. They lack nictitating membrane and some species are heavily associated with Ommatokoita elongata, potentially bioluminescent parasitic copepod, permanently attached to the corneas, that frequently leave the sharks partially or completely blind. The family is believed to have arisen during the Late Cretaceous period roughly 92.29 Ma.

== Distribution and habitat ==
The Somniosidae can be found in:

- Arctic to subantarctic waters
- Shelves in cold waters
- Continental and slopes
- Temperate and tropical waters

== Diet ==
Sleeper sharks are opportunistic scavengers and apex predators and consume a wide variety of prey ranging from bottom-dwelling fish to colossal squid.

== Genera and species ==
- Centroscymnus Barbosa du Bocage & Brito Capello, 1864
  - Centroscymnus coelolepis Barbosa du Bocage & Brito Capello, 1864 (Portuguese dogfish)
  - Centroscymnus owstonii Garman, 1906 (roughskin dogfish)
- Centroselachus Garman, 1913
  - Centroselachus crepidater Barbosa du Bocage & Brito Capello, 1864 (longnose velvet dogfish)
- Scymnodalatias Garrick, 1956
  - Scymnodalatias albicauda Taniuchi & Garrick, 1986 (whitetail dogfish)
  - Scymnodalatias garricki Kukuyev & Konovalenko, 1988 (Azores dogfish)
  - Scymnodalatias oligodon Kukuyev & Konovalenko, 1988 (sparsetooth dogfish)
  - Scymnodalatias sherwoodi Archey, 1921 (Sherwood dogfish)
- Scymnodon Barbosa du Bocage & Brito Capello, 1864
  - Scymnodon ichiharai Yano & S. Tanaka (II), 1984 (Japanese velvet dogfish)
  - Scymnodon macracanthus Regan, 1906 (largespine velvet dogfish)
  - Scymnodon plunketi Waite, 1910 (Plunket's shark)
  - Scymnodon ringens Barbosa du Bocage & Brito Capello, 1864 (knifetooth dogfish)
- Somniosus Lesueur, 1818
  - Somniosus antarcticus Whitley, 1939 (southern sleeper shark)
  - Somniosus cheni Hsu, Lin, & Joung, 2020 (Taiwan sleeper shark)
  - Somniosus longus Tanaka, 1912 (frog shark)
  - Somniosus microcephalus Bloch & J. G. Schneider, 1801 (Greenland shark)
  - Somniosus pacificus Bigelow & Schroeder, 1944 (Pacific sleeper shark)
  - Somniosus rostratus Risso, 1827 (little sleeper shark)
  - Somniosus sp. A Not yet described (longnose sleeper shark)
- Zameus D. S. Jordan & Fowler, 1903
  - Zameus squamulosus Günther, 1877 (velvet dogfish)
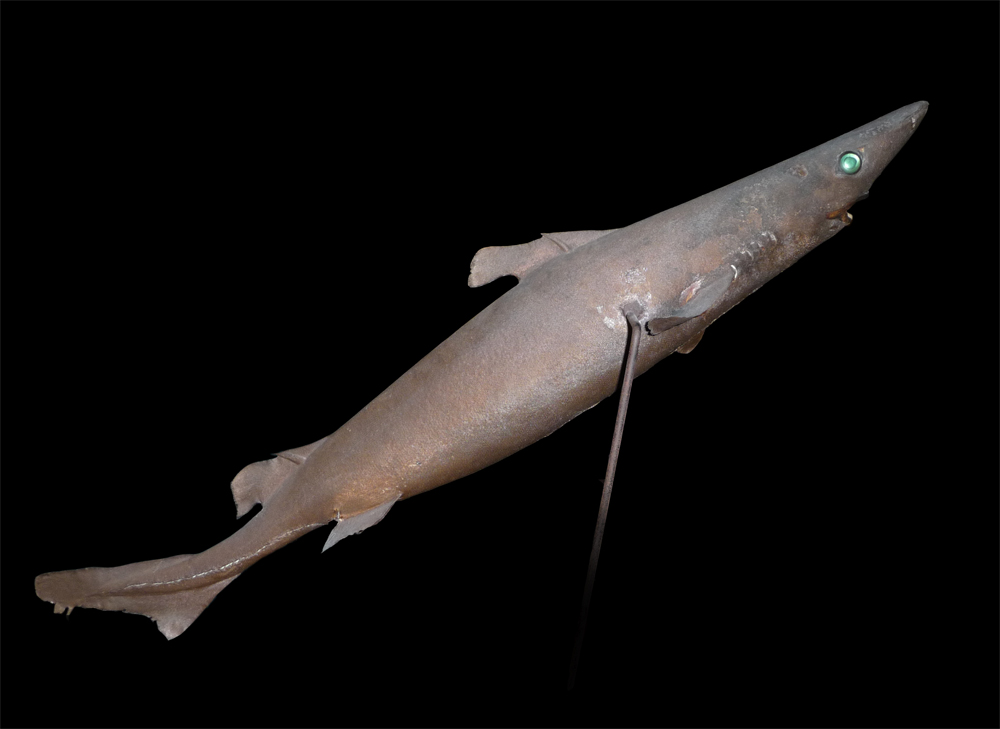
Centroscymnus crepidater

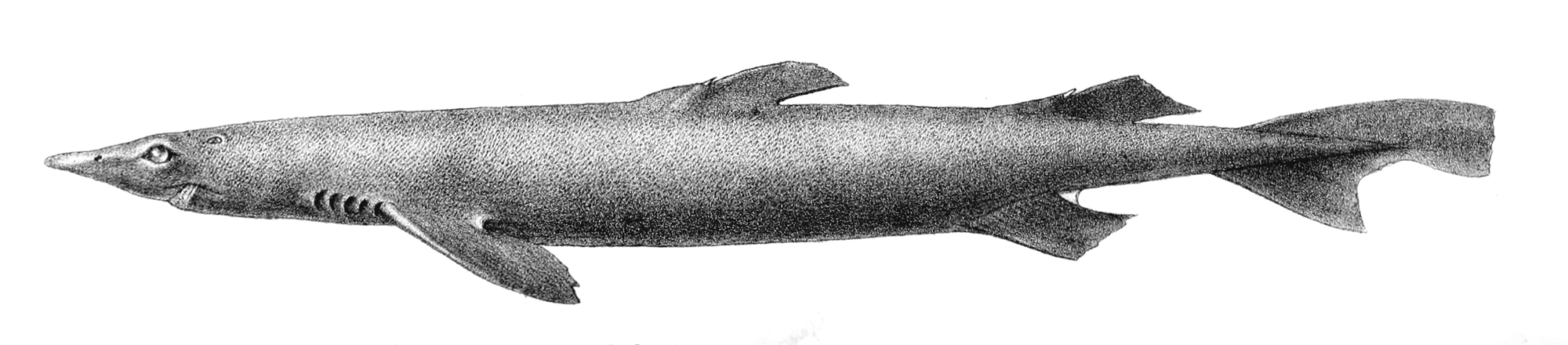
Scymnodon obscurus

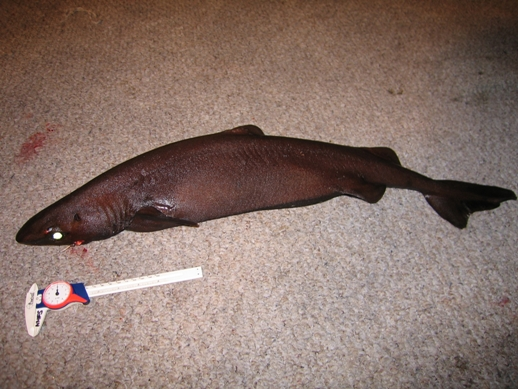
Zameus squamulosus

== Hákarl ==
Greenland sharks of the family Somniosidae are hunted for food in Iceland. In modern times, many Greenlandic sharks used for hákarl production are purchased from fishing ships where the sharks were trapped in the fishing nets. The shark carcass is traditionally fermented in a shallow pit, with stones placed on top of the shark, allowing poisonous internal fluids, like urea and trimethylamine oxide, to be pressed and drained out of the body. The meat is then cured for several months, rendering it safe for human consumption.
