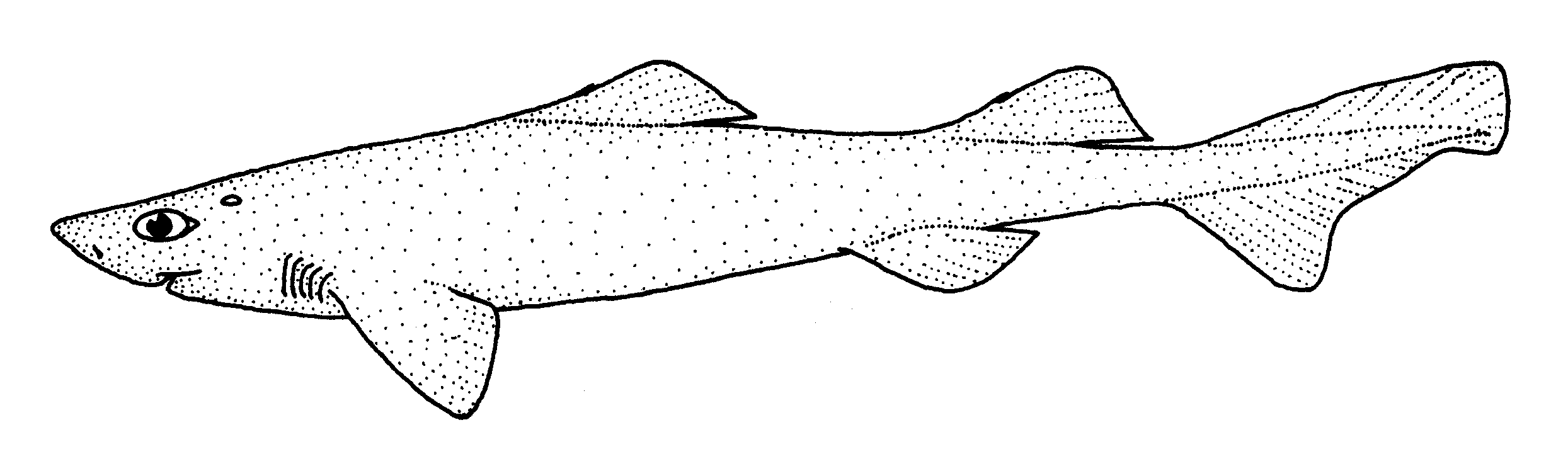
- Drawing by Dr Tony Ayling

Conservation status
- Vulnerable (IUCN 3.1)

Scientific classification
- Kingdom: Animalia
- Phylum: Chordata
- Class: Chondrichthyes
- Subclass: Elasmobranchii
- Division: Selachii
- Order: Squaliformes
- Family: Somniosidae
- Genus: Scymnodon
- Species: S. plunketi

Binomial name
- Scymnodon plunketi Waite, 1910
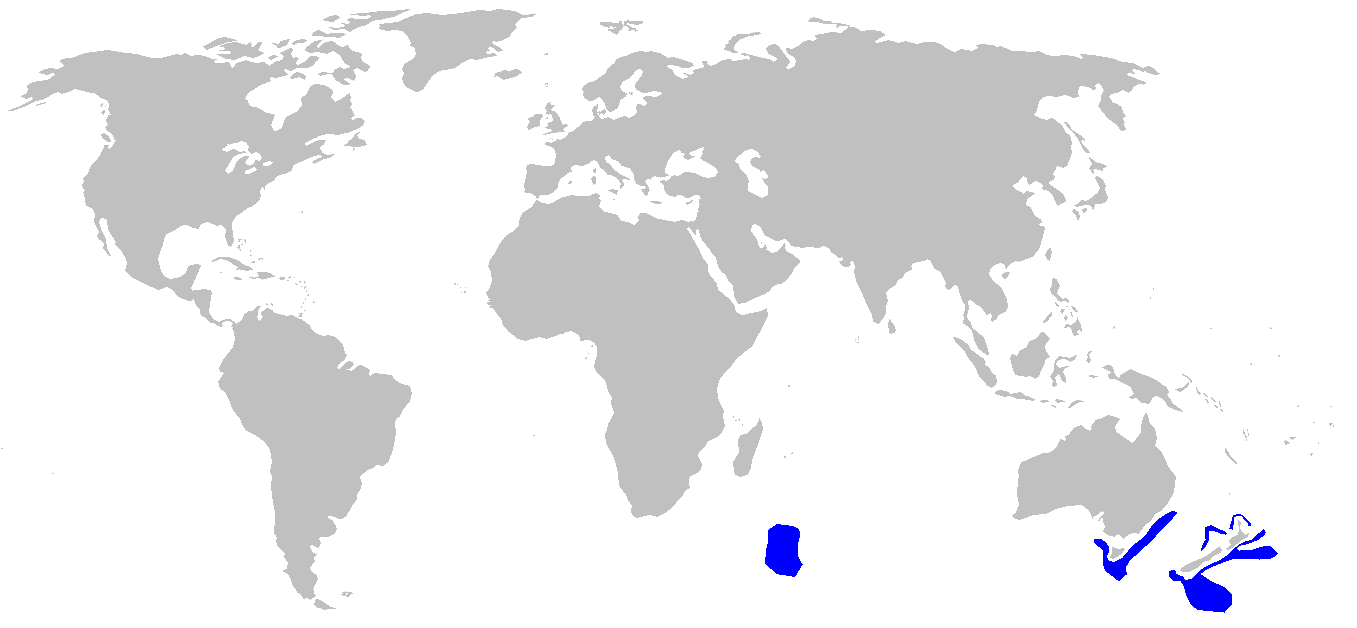
- Range of the plunket shark (in blue)

Synonyms
- Centroscymnus plunketi Waite, 1910; Proscymnodon plunketi Waite, 1910

= Plunket shark =

Species of fish

The plunket shark or Plunket's shark (Scymnodon plunketi) is a sleeper shark of the family Somniosidae, found around south eastern Australia, and New Zealand, at depths of between 220 and 1,550 m over continental shelves. It reaches a length of 130 cm.
