= Japanese velvet dogfish =

Scymnodon ichiharai

Conservation status
- Vulnerable (IUCN 3.1)

Scientific classification
- Kingdom: Animalia
- Phylum: Chordata
- Class: Chondrichthyes
- Subclass: Elasmobranchii
- Division: Selachii
- Order: Squaliformes
- Family: Somniosidae
- Genus: Scymnodon
- Species: S. ichiharai

Binomial name
- Scymnodon ichiharai Ka. Yano & S. Tanaka (II), 1984
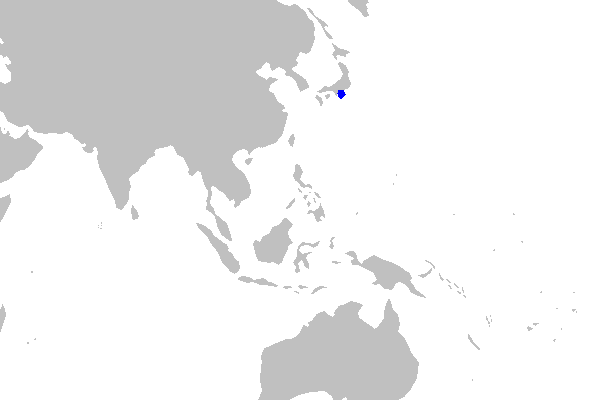
- Range of the Japanese velvet dogfish

Synonyms
- Zameus ichiharai Yano & Tanaka, 1984

Species of shark

The Japanese velvet dogfish (Scymnodon ichiharai) is a harmless deepwater sleeper shark of the family Somniosidae, found in the northwest Pacific from Suruga Bay and adjacent waters of Japan at depths of between 500 and 800 metres (1,600 and 2,600 ft). Reproduction is ovoviviparous.
