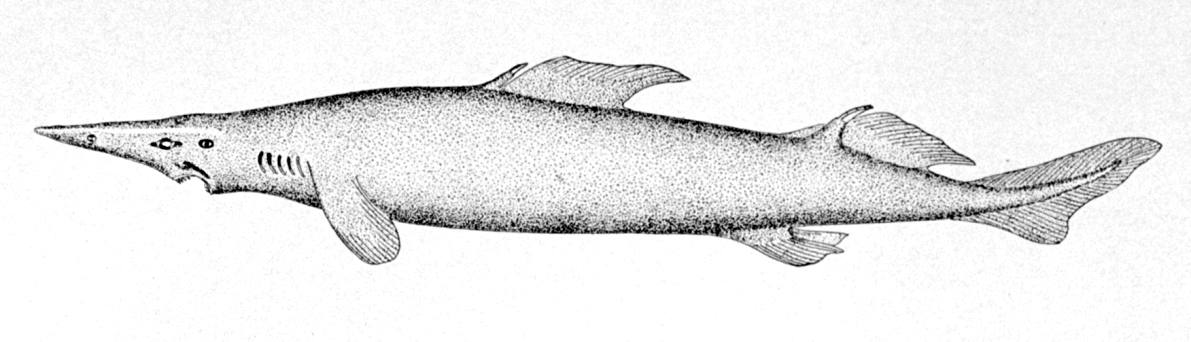

Conservation status
- Vulnerable (IUCN 3.1)

Scientific classification
- Kingdom: Animalia
- Phylum: Chordata
- Class: Chondrichthyes
- Subclass: Elasmobranchii
- Division: Selachii
- Order: Squaliformes
- Family: Somniosidae
- Genus: Scymnodon
- Species: S. ringens

Binomial name
- Scymnodon ringens Barbosa du Bocage & Brito Capello, 1864
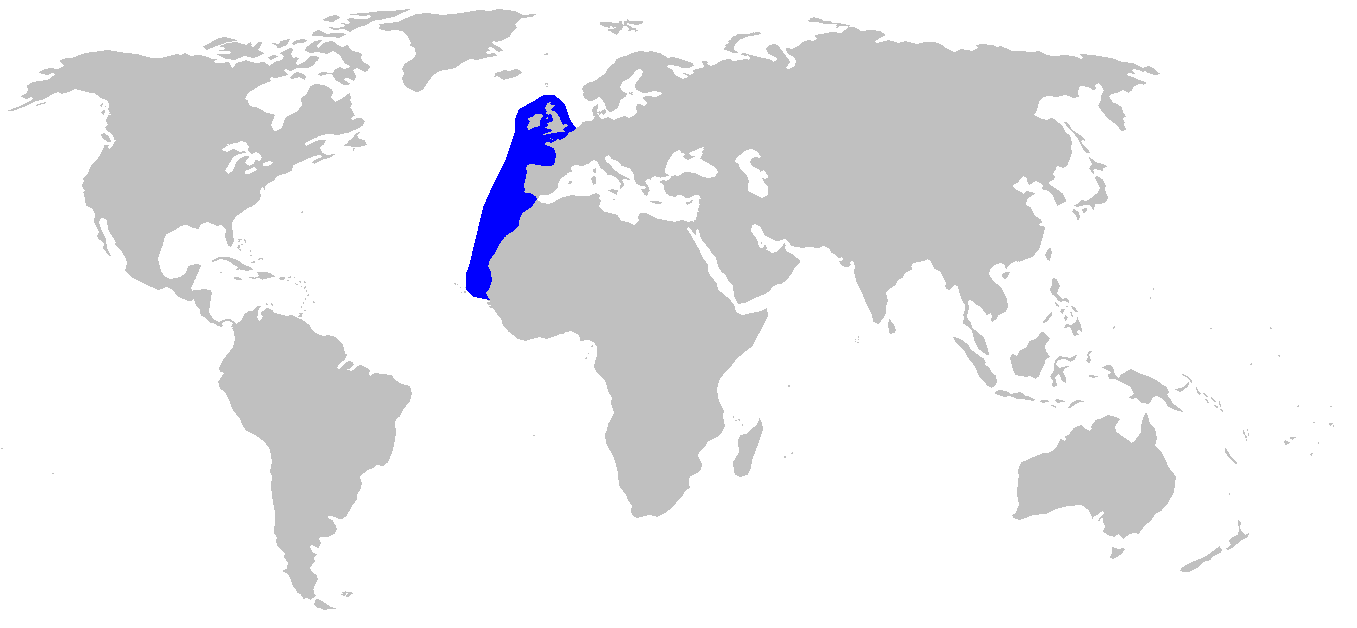
- Range of the knifetooth dogfish (in blue)

= Knifetooth dogfish =

Species of shark

The knifetooth dogfish (Scymnodon ringens), is a harmless sleeper shark of the family Somniosidae, found in the eastern Atlantic, from Scotland to Spain, Portugal, and Senegal, and the southwest Pacific from New Zealand, between latitudes 58°N and 15°N, at depths of between 200 and 1,600 m. Its length is up to 1.1 metres (3.6 ft).
