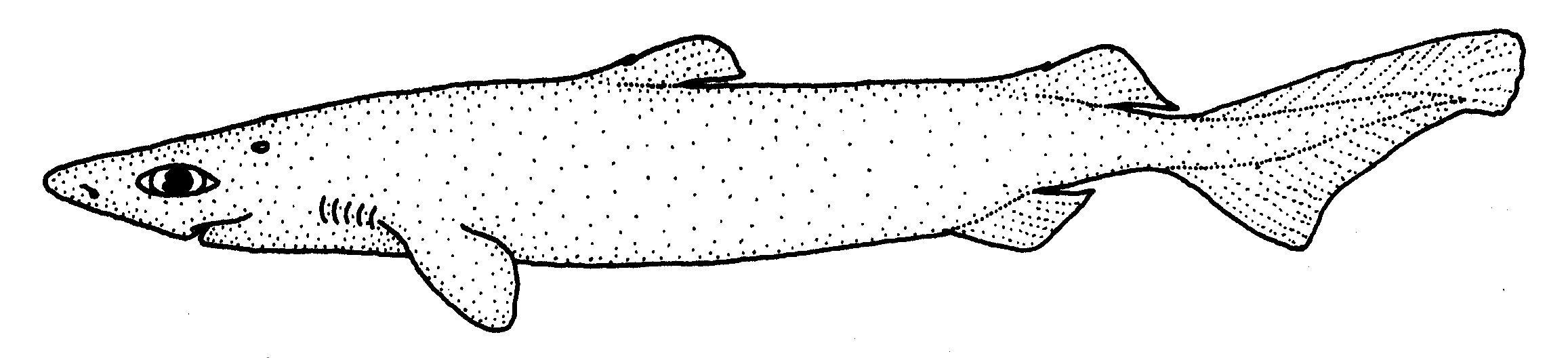
- Drawing by Dr Tony Ayling

Conservation status
- Vulnerable (IUCN 3.1)

Scientific classification
- Kingdom: Animalia
- Phylum: Chordata
- Class: Chondrichthyes
- Subclass: Elasmobranchii
- Division: Selachii
- Order: Squaliformes
- Family: Somniosidae
- Genus: Centroscymnus
- Species: C. owstonii

Binomial name
- Centroscymnus owstonii (Garman, 1906)
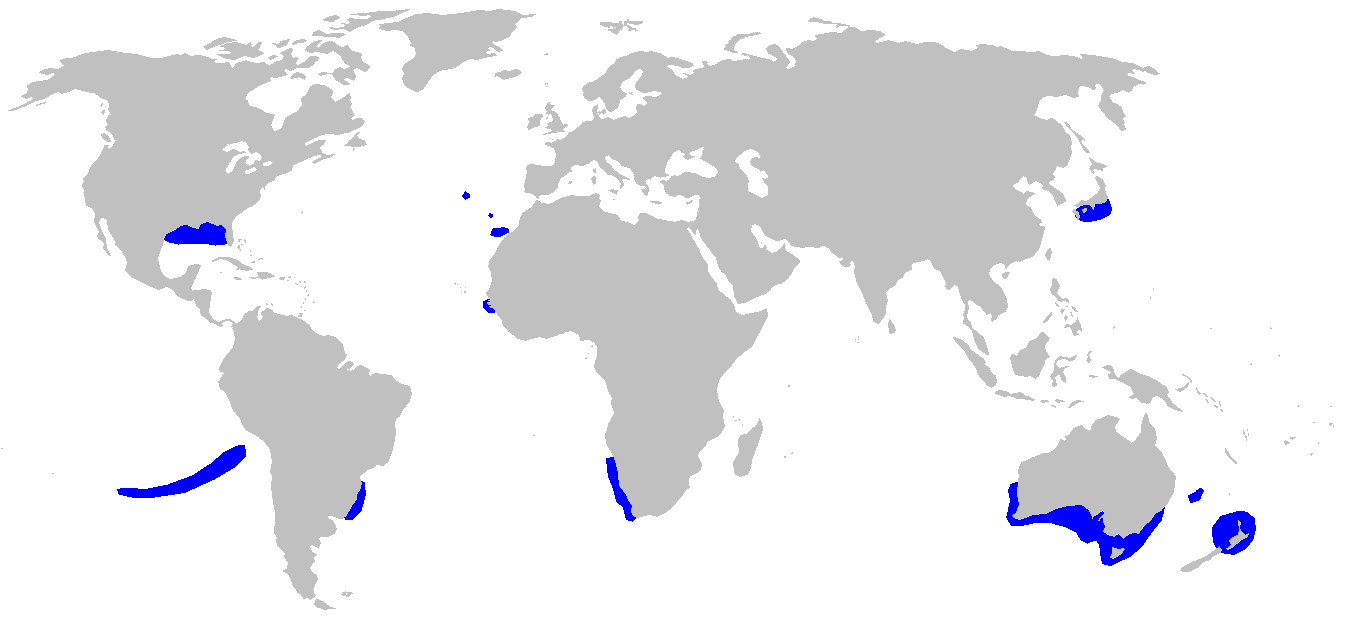
- Range of the roughskin dogfish (in blue)

Synonyms
- Centroscymnus cryptacanthus Regan, 1906

= Roughskin dogfish =

Species of shark

The roughskin dogfish (Centroscymnus owstonii) is a sleeper shark of the family Somniosidae, found around the world on continental shelves in tropical, subtropical and temperate seas, at depths of between 100 and 1,500 m. It reaches a length of 121 cm.

This species is distributed in deep-sea communities throughout the western and eastern Indian Ocean as well as in the south-central Atlantic Ocean and the South Pacific Ocean (Tasmania).

== Conservation status ==
The New Zealand Department of Conservation has classified the roughskin dogfish as "Not Threatened" under the New Zealand Threat Classification System.

== Ecosystem ==
Centroscymnus owstonii holds importance in its ecosystem as a predator and component of the upper slope assemblage, as it maintains an ecological balance in deep-sea communities. Particularly, in the depth range of 750–2050 meters, it contributes substantially (>60%) to the biomass and assemblage similarity.

=== Diet ===
As a top predator, the prey of C. owstonii consists mainly of fishes, with small proportions of crustaceans, squid and salps. The fish prey were predominantly hoki, with some mesopelagic sea bream (B. australis and B. brama), slender tuna (Allothunnus fallai), and a demersal rattail (Coelorinchus bollonsi).

== Etymology ==
The fish is named in honor of Alan Owston (1853‒ 1915), an English businessman, a yachtsman, and a collector of Asian wildlife, who obtained the holotype.
