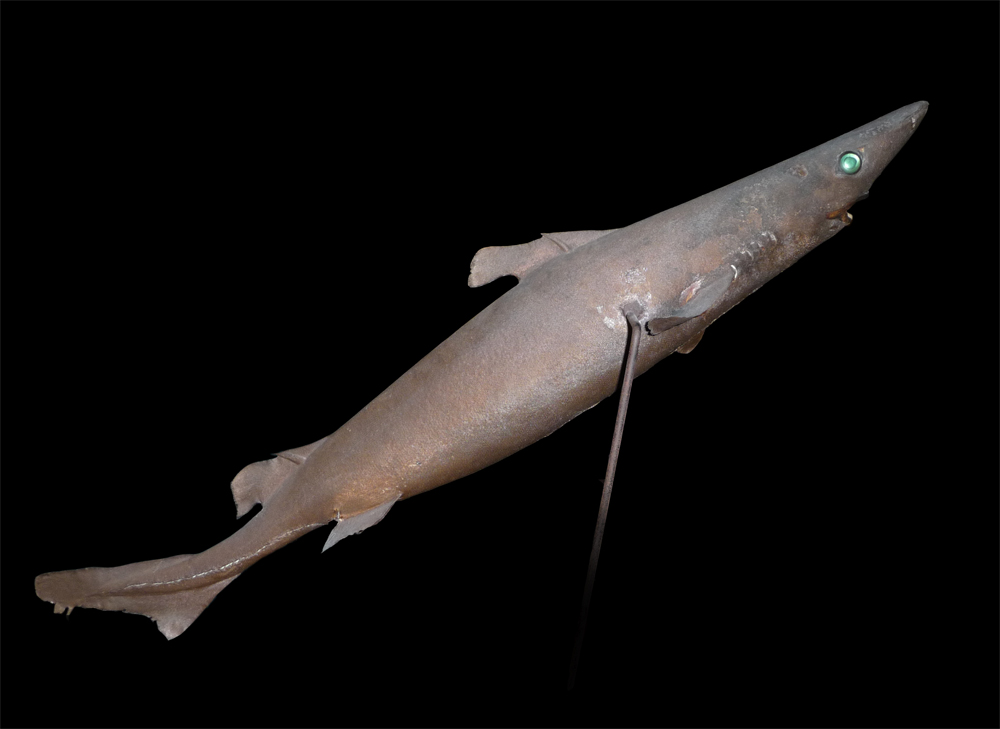

Conservation status
- Near Threatened (IUCN 3.1)

Scientific classification
- Kingdom: Animalia
- Phylum: Chordata
- Class: Chondrichthyes
- Subclass: Elasmobranchii
- Division: Selachii
- Order: Squaliformes
- Family: Somniosidae
- Genus: Centroselachus; Garman, 1913
- Species: C. crepidater

Binomial name
- Centroselachus crepidater (Barbosa du Bocage & Brito Capello, 1864)
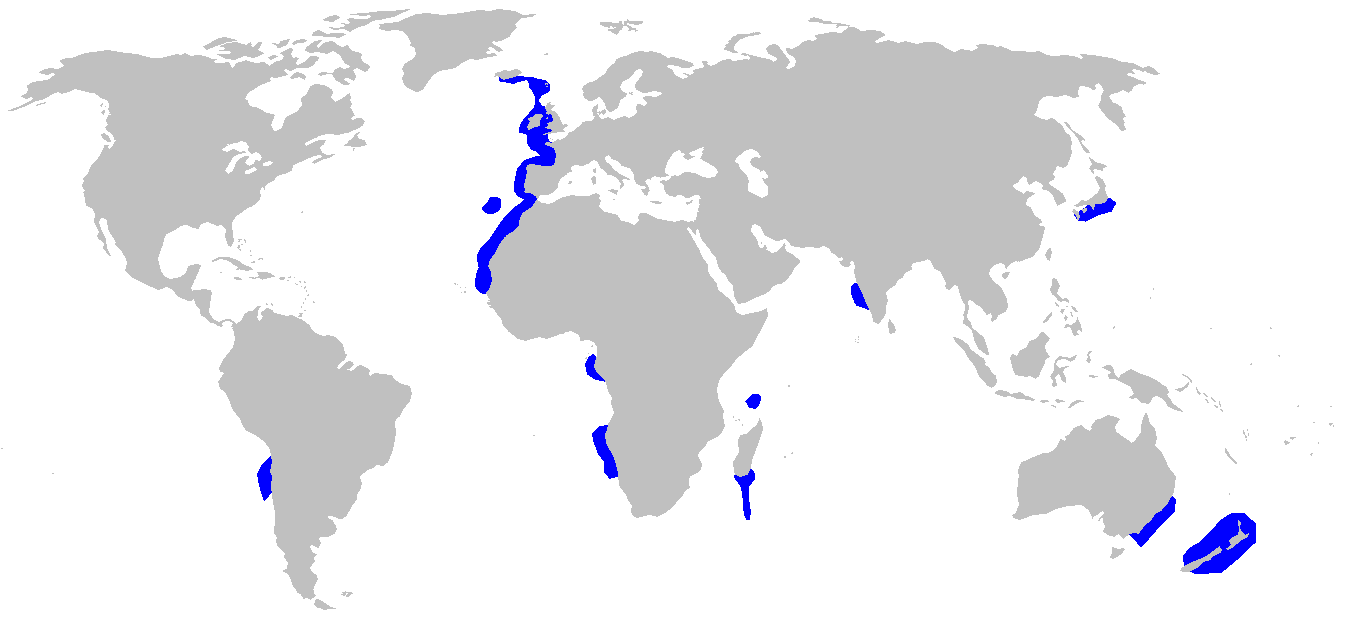
- Range of the longnose velvet dogfish (in blue)

= Longnose velvet dogfish =

Species of shark

The longnose velvet dogfish (Centroselachus crepidater) is a sleeper shark of the family Somniosidae, found circumglobally in Southern Hemisphere subtropical seas, at depths of between 230 and 1,500 m. It reaches a length of 130 cm. It has a diet consisting of predominantly mesopelagic fishes and squids.

== Conservation status ==
The New Zealand Department of Conservation has classified the longnose velvet dogfish as "Not Threatened" with the qualifier "Secure Overseas" under the New Zealand Threat Classification System.
