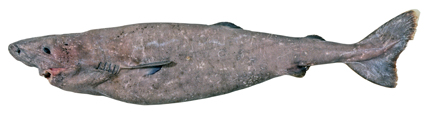

Conservation status
- Least Concern (IUCN 3.1)

Scientific classification
- Kingdom: Animalia
- Phylum: Chordata
- Class: Chondrichthyes
- Subclass: Elasmobranchii
- Division: Selachii
- Order: Squaliformes
- Family: Somniosidae
- Genus: Somniosus
- Species: S. antarcticus

Binomial name
- Somniosus antarcticus Whitley, 1939
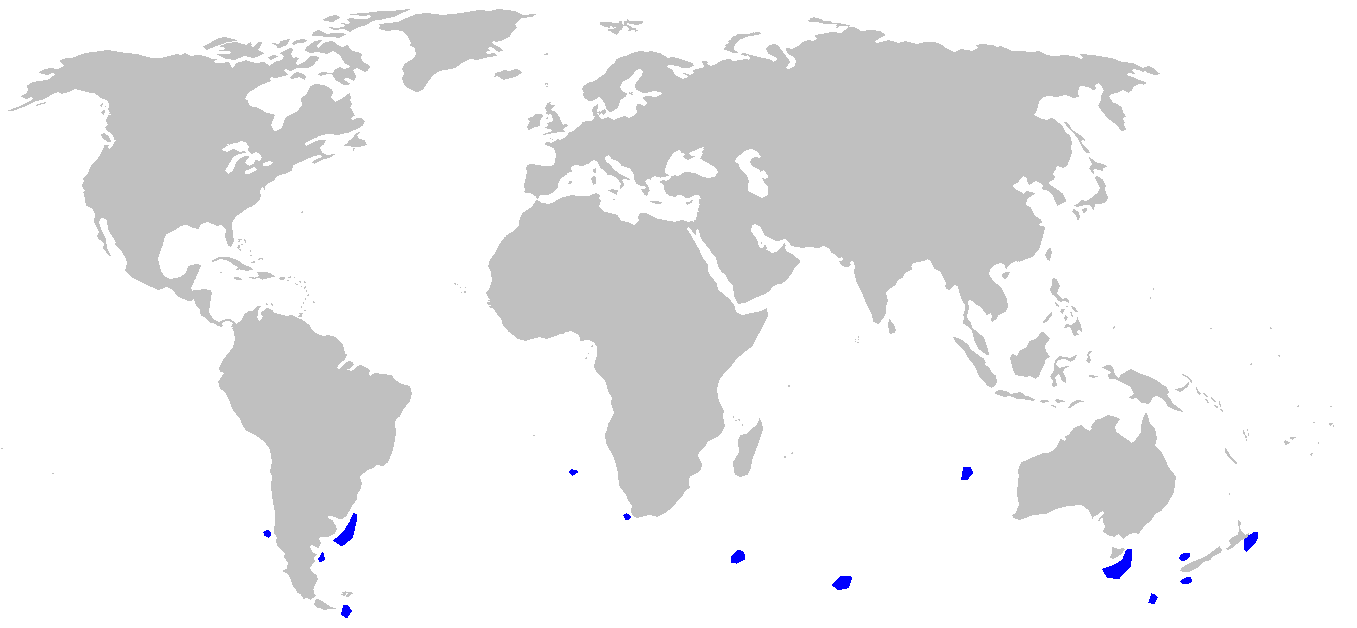
- Range (in blue)

= Southern sleeper shark =

Species of shark

The southern sleeper shark, or Whitley's sleeper shark (Somniosus antarcticus), is a deepwater benthopelagic sleeper shark of the family Somniosidae found in the southern and subantarctic extremes of the Atlantic, Indian and Pacific Oceans, and some northern reaches of the Antarctic oceans. It has been recorded near the southernmost areas of South America (such as Tierra del Fuego and the Strait of Magellan), near South Africa, southern Australia, Tasmania and New Zealand, as well as more remote locations in the south-central Indian Ocean.

== Taxonomy ==
The southern sleeper shark was formerly considered conspecific with either the Greenland (Somniosus microcephalus) or Pacific sleeper shark (S. pacificus), but was recognized as a distinct species by Yano et al. (2004) based on morphological and meristic differences.

The distinction between S. antarcticus and S. pacificus, however, remains unresolved. Phylogenetic analyses by Timm et al. (2023) found S. antarcticus specimens intermixed with S. pacificus and provided molecular evidence supporting their synonymization, although only two S. antarcticus specimens were included.

Another study by Mancilla et al. (2026) found similarly low genetic differentation between the two, but continued to recognize the Southern Hemisphere form as S. antarcticus based on morphological evidence. The authors note that further genomic research is needed to resolve their relationships.

== Distribution ==
Southern sleepers have a wide distribution throughout the Southern Ocean and temperate waters of the Southern Hemisphere. They have been recorded off Patagonia, Chile, Argentina, Namibia, South Africa, southern Australia, Tasmania and New Zealand.They are deepwater, primarily demersal to benthopelagic sharks, ocurring along continental and insular slopes, seamounts and oceanic plateaus at depths of at least 300-1,440 m (984-4724 ft).

In 2025, a shark believed to be a southern sleeper was sighted at 490 meters deep in the South Shetland Trough by a research team's underwater camera, among the first ever confirmed sightings of a shark in the Southern Ocean.

== Description ==
The southern sleeper shark is a large, robust fish with a torpedo-shaped body, short, broadly rounded snout, small eyes and relatively small fins. The two dorsal fins lack spines and are low, with the first originating well behind the pectoral fins. The caudal fin is asymmetrical and paddle-shaped, with a prominent upper lobe. The skin is covered in dermal denticles with narrow, erect corwns and hook-like cusps, giving it a rough texture. Like other sleeper sharks, this species is generally a uniform dark brownish-grey to grey in color. They have been reported to reach at least to 4.4 m (14.4 ft) in total length, though later literature suggests maximum lengths of up to 6 m (19.7 ft).

The teeth of the upper and lower jaws differ in form. The upper teeth are relatrively small and narrow with erect, lanceolate cusps while the lower teeth are large, overlapping and blade-like, with short, oblique cusps. A specimen from Chile possessed 37 upper and 52 lower tooth files. Compared to both the Greenland and the Pacific sleeper shark , the southern sleeper has lower dorsal fins, which the other two do not; they also have a greater number of lower jaw tooth rows and spiral valve turns and fewer precaudal vertebrae.

== Behavior and ecology ==
=== Diet and feeding ===
The southern sleeper shark is an opportunistic predator and scavenger that feeds on a variety of animal prey such as cephalopods, fishes, benthic invertebrates and even marine mammals. Squid appear to be particularly important in the diet of this shark.

In a study of 36 individuals caught in Kerguelen waters, all 36 stomachs contained cephalopod remains (beaks and flesh). Four large squid from juveniles to adult stages dominated the cephalopod diet component: giant warty squid, Dana octopus squid, colossal squid and giant squid. Other cephalopods recorded from the Kerguelen sharks included Alluroteuthis antarcticus, Chiroteuthis veranii, Filippovia knipovitchi, Galiteuthis glacialis, Gonatus antarcticus, Histioteuthis atlantica, H. eltaninae, Martialia hyadesi, Mastigoteuthis psychrophila, Megalocranchia sp., Moroteuthopsis ingens, Todarodes angolensis, and an unidentified large cirrate octopod. The largest reconstructed cephalopod specimen recorded from the stomach contents of one of the Kerguelen sharks was an adult giant squid with an estimated 220 (7.2 ft) cm mantle and approximately weighed 96 kg (211.6 lb). It remains unknown whether the largest squid are captured alive or consumed as carrion.

Fish prey recorded in the southern sleeper shark's diet include Patagonian toothfish, marbled and grey rockcod, and Bathyraja skates. Benthic invertebrates such as brittle and sea stars have also been recorded. Mammalian prey includes fur seals (perhaps Antarctic fur seals) and even cetaceans. A record from Chile involved a 3.6 (11.8 ft) female sleeper shark with tissue remains of an adult female southern right whale dolphin and a complete dolphin fetus.

=== Reproduction ===
Reproduction in the southern sleeper shark poorly known. Females are viviparous, with embryos developing internally. Females are estimated to reach sexual maturity at 4.3-4.5 m (14.1-14.8 ft) in total length. In 2023, a female was incidentally captured by a deep-sea longline fishery off Antofagasta, Chile. During handling, the female expelled a late-stage, near-term male embryo measuring 90.5 cm (35.6 in) in length.

== Conservation status ==
In June 2018 the New Zealand Department of Conservation classified the southern sleeper shark as "Not Threatened" with the qualifiers "Data Poor" and "Uncertain whether Secure Overseas" under the New Zealand Threat Classification System. The IUCN also does not regard it as threatened, noting a widespread distribution and no indication of a declining population, but believes it is not naturally abundant and that much more data and understanding of its population, interactions and biology is needed.They are sometimes taken as accidental bycatch in the orange roughy and Patagonian toothfish fisheries; whether or not this poses a threat to the species is currently unknown.
