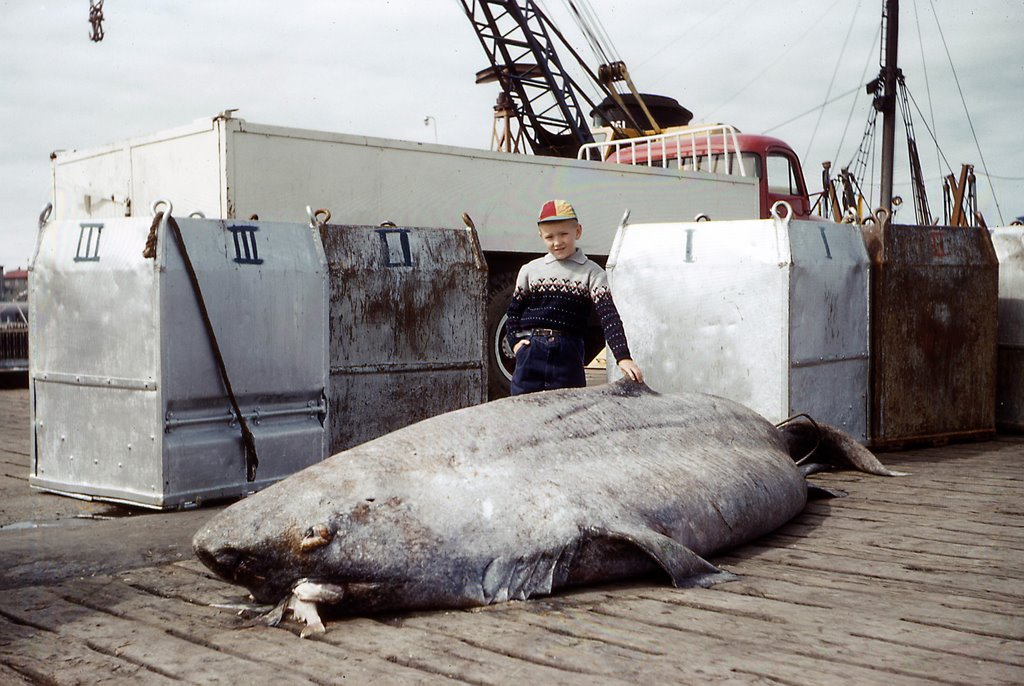
- Somniosus microcephalus

Scientific classification
- Kingdom: Animalia
- Phylum: Chordata
- Class: Chondrichthyes
- Subclass: Elasmobranchii
- Division: Selachii
- Order: Squaliformes
- Family: Somniosidae
- Genus: Somniosus; Lesueur, 1818

Type species
- Squalus microcephalus

= Somniosus =

Somniosus Temporal range: Early Oligocene to present

Genus of sharks

Somniosus is a widely distributed genus of deepwater dogfish sharks in the family Somniosidae. Several members of the genus are believed to attain lengths up to 7 m (23 ft), thus ranking among the largest of sharks.

== Species ==
- Somniosus antarcticus Whitley, 1939 (southern sleeper shark)
- Somniosus cheni Hsu, Lin, & Joung, 2020 (Taiwan sleeper shark)
- †Somniosus gonzalezi Welton & Goedert, 2016 – fossil, Oligocene
- Somniosus longus Tanaka, 1912 (frog shark)
- Somniosus microcephalus (Bloch & J. G. Schneider, 1801) (Greenland shark)
- Somniosus pacificus Bigelow & Schroeder, 1944 (Pacific sleeper shark)
- Somniosus rostratus A. Risso, 1827 (little sleeper shark)
- Somniosus sp. A Not yet described (longnose sleeper shark)
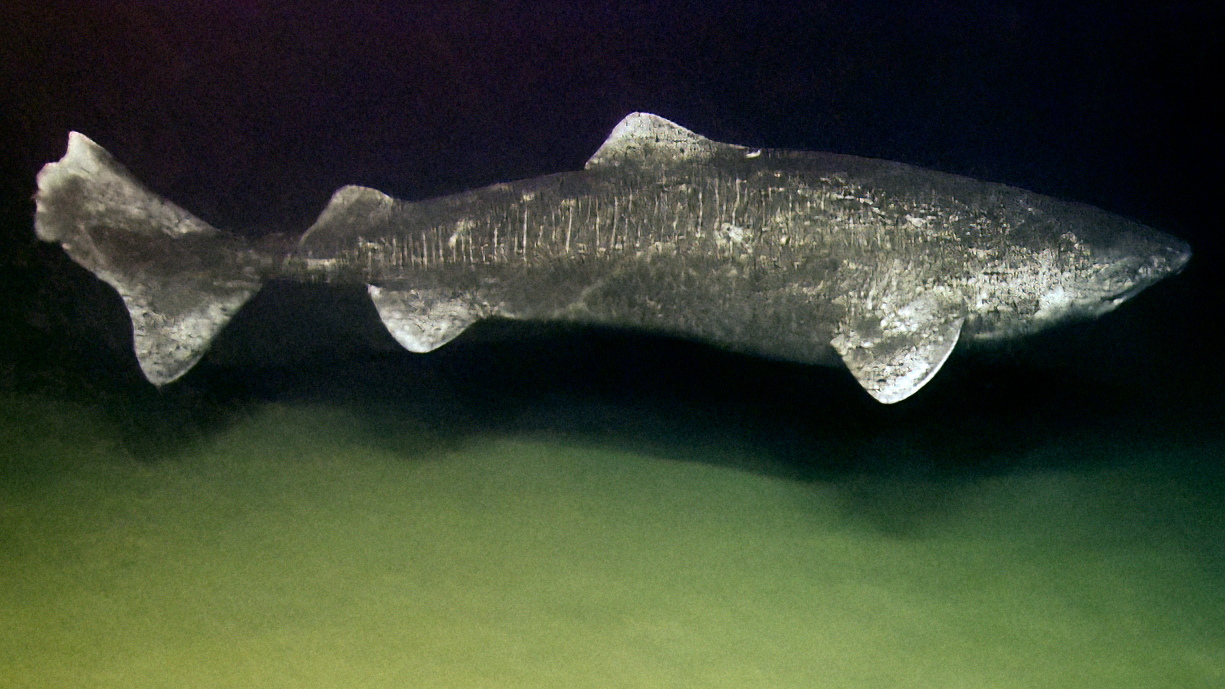
Somniosus microcephalus

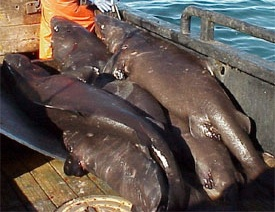
Somniosus pacificus

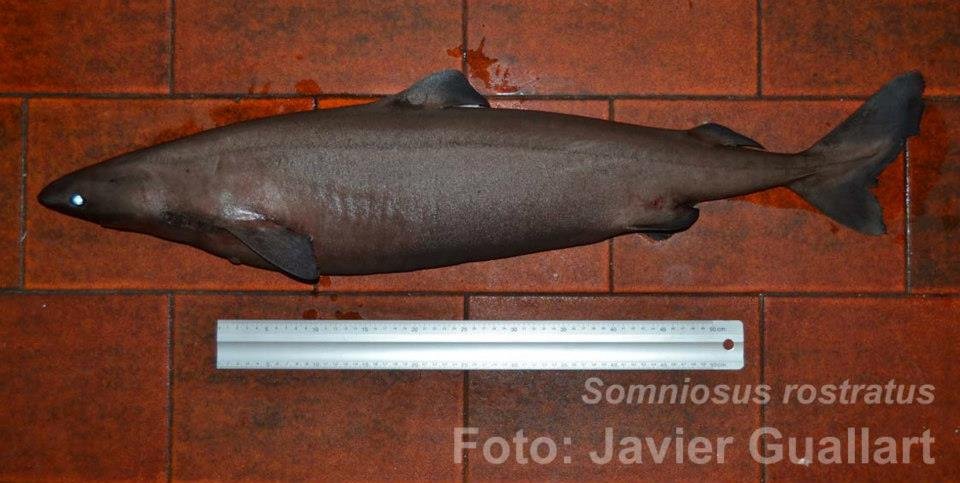
Somniosus rostratus

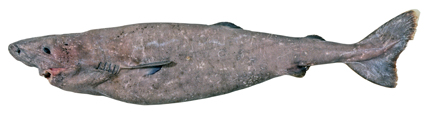
Somniosus antarcticus

== See also ==
- List of prehistoric cartilaginous fish
