= Taiwan sleeper shark =

Conservation status
- Data Deficient (IUCN 3.1)

Scientific classification
- Kingdom: Animalia
- Phylum: Chordata
- Class: Chondrichthyes
- Subclass: Elasmobranchii
- Division: Selachii
- Order: Squaliformes
- Family: Somniosidae
- Genus: Somniosus
- Species: S. cheni

Binomial name
- Somniosus cheni Hsu, Lin, & Joung, 2020

Species of shark

The Taiwan sleeper shark (Somniosus cheni) is a small sleeper shark from the western North Pacific Ocean around Taiwan. It is only known from a single adult specimen, a 1.34 m (4.4 ft) pregnant female with 33 embryos, which was caught in 2017.
