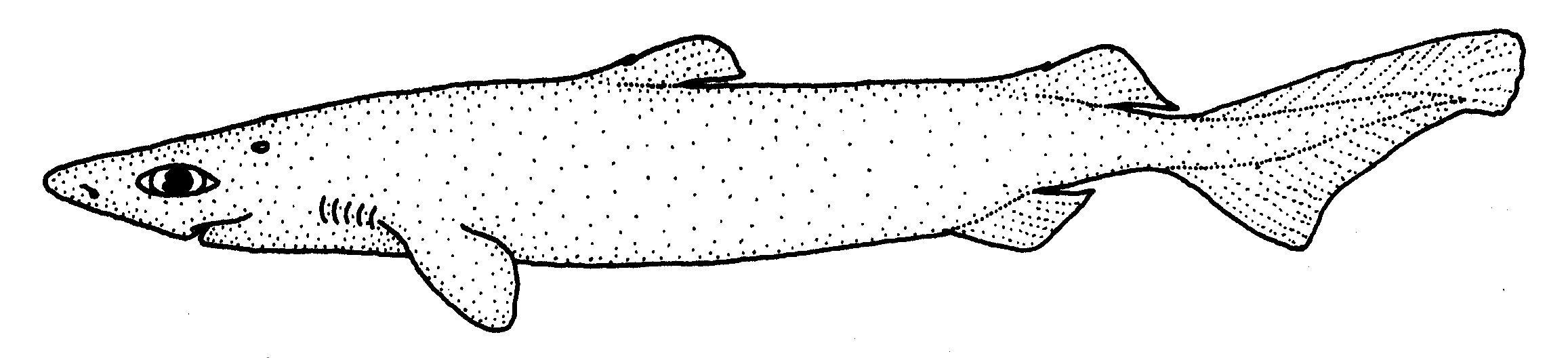
- Roughskin dogfish Centroscymnus owstonii Drawing by Dr Tony Ayling

Scientific classification
- Kingdom: Animalia
- Phylum: Chordata
- Class: Chondrichthyes
- Subclass: Elasmobranchii
- Division: Selachii
- Order: Squaliformes
- Family: Somniosidae
- Genus: Centroscymnus; Barbosa du Bocage & Brito Capello, 1864

= Centroscymnus =

Genus of sharks

Centroscymnus is a genus of squaliform sleeper sharks in the family Somniosidae and of the phylum chordata.

== Species ==
- Centroscymnus coelolepis Barbosa du Bocage & Brito Capello, 1864 (Portuguese dogfish)
- Centroscymnus owstonii Garman, 1906 (roughskin dogfish)
