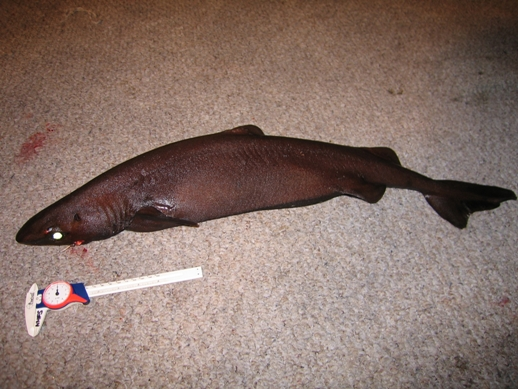

Conservation status
- Least Concern (IUCN 3.1)

Scientific classification
- Kingdom: Animalia
- Phylum: Chordata
- Class: Chondrichthyes
- Subclass: Elasmobranchii
- Division: Selachii
- Order: Squaliformes
- Family: Somniosidae
- Genus: Zameus; D. S. Jordan & Fowler, 1903
- Species: Z. squamulosus

Binomial name
- Zameus squamulosus (Günther, 1877)
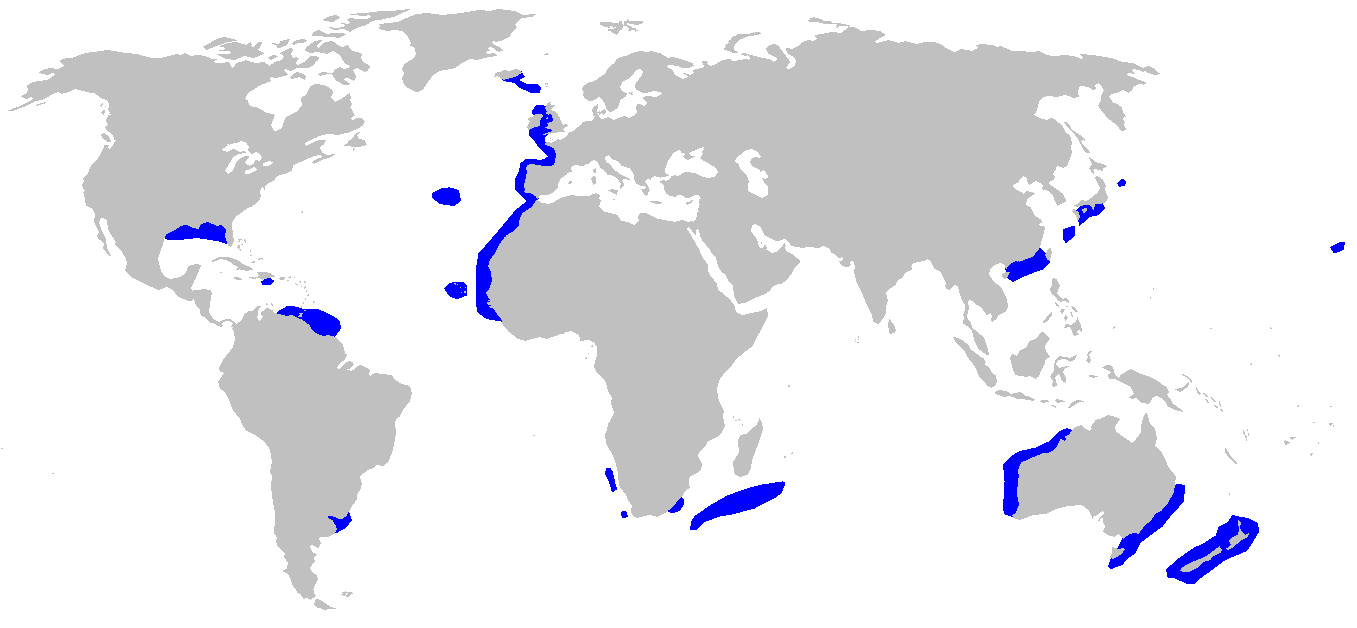
- Range of the velvet dogfish

Synonyms
- Centrophorus squamulosus Günther, 1877; Scymnodon obscurus Vaillant, 1888; Scymnodon niger Chu & Meng, 1982; Scymnodon squamulosus Günther, 1877

= Velvet dogfish =

Species of shark

The velvet dogfish (Zameus squamulosus), the only member of the genus Zameus, is a small sleeper shark of the family Somniosidae, found around the world between latitudes 64°N and 48°S, from the surface to 2,000 m.

== Description ==
Velvet dogfish range from 24.5 cm up to 84 cm. Although sharks within the family Somniosidae have generally been accepted to be non-luminous, Zameus squamulosus has photophores on its ventral epidermis allowing for them to be bioluminescent. They are mainly found as common bycatch to commercial fishes such as scabbardfish, tuna and swordfish. Despite being common bycatch, little is known of their biology due to them inhabiting deeper waters which are difficult to access.

== Distribution ==
Zameus squamulosus is found in latitudes between 64°N and 48°S within the Atlantic, Pacific and Indian Ocean. One well documented area of Zameus squamulosus is within the cost of Hawaii during fishing as it is common bycatch to tuna and swordfish. However they are commonly described as bottom dwelling fishes off continental and insular slopes within depths up to 2000 meters deep. Due to it inhabiting deeper waters, it is not well known just how far Zameus squamulosus is distributed.

== Biology ==
There is debate as to how the Velvet dogfish reproduces. One belief is that they reproduce ovoviviparously. Ovoviviparous is a form of life birth in which the eggs are “hatched” and the offspring grows within the female before being delivered. However, it is also believed that they actually reproduce viviparously, having a litter of 3 to 10 pups throughout the year. It is not assumed to have any breeding season. Female maturity in Zameus squamulosus is undetermined and varies widely throughout studies. It is estimated to be reached once they are about 71.5cm size in total length, with a maximum length of about 73cm for pregnant females for some, but there are records of mature females being as small as 57.1cm. Male maturity is believed to range from 493mm to 950mm with some males being measured as small as 410mm. It is inferred that they feed primarily on squid. Velvet dogfish primarily feed on squid which are abundant in their deep habitat, where other prey such as crustaceans and shrimp are less common. There is also the belief that Zameus squamulosus take advantage of the migration current of squid and fish to enhance their predation success. While a majority of Squaliformes possess “bristle and spine-shaped” placoid scales, Zameus squamulosus do not. Rather, their scales overlap and possess of a role as a “bioluminescence enhancer”. The inferred purpose of these bioluminescent placoid scales is to prevent predation from predators underneath them as it emits blue-green light.

== Conservation ==
The main interaction with Zameus squamulosus with humans is through being bycatch within the fishing industry, despite mainly inhabiting deeper waters. In June 2018 the New Zealand Department of Conservation classified the velvet dogfish as "Data Deficient" with the qualifier "Uncertain whether Secure Overseas" under the New Zealand Threat Classification System.
