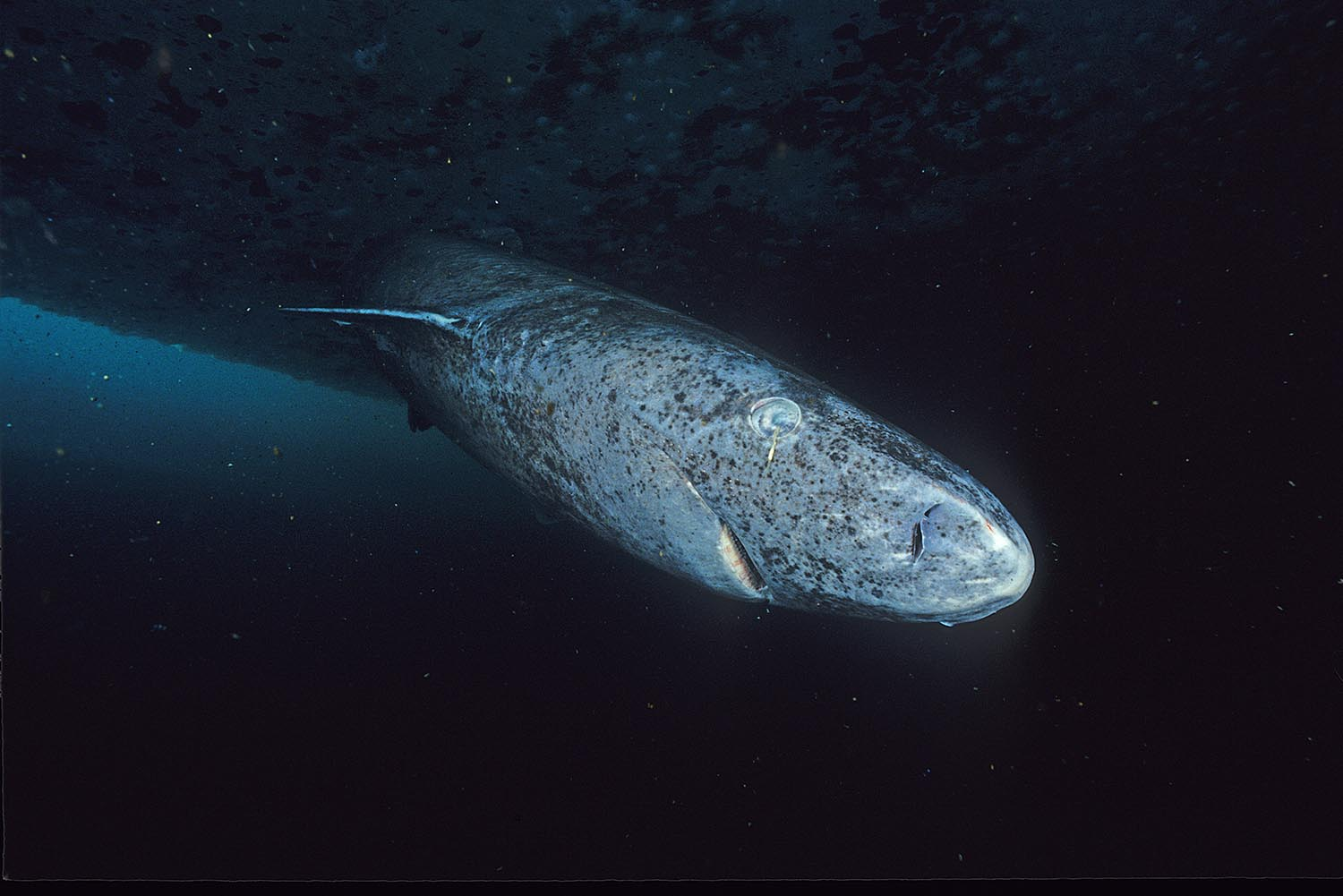
- Ommatokoita on a Greenland shark

Scientific classification
- Kingdom: Animalia
- Phylum: Arthropoda
- Clade: Pancrustacea
- Class: Copepoda
- Order: Siphonostomatoida
- Family: Lernaeopodidae
- Genus: Ommatokoita; Leigh-Sharpe, 1926
- Species: O. elongata

Binomial name
- Ommatokoita elongata (Grant, 1827)

Synonyms
- Lernaea elongata Grant, 1827; Ommatokoita superba Leigh-Sharpe, 1926

= Ommatokoita =

Genus of crustaceans

Ommatokoita is a monotypic genus of copepods, the sole species being Ommatokoita elongata. However, a specimen has been found on the skin of the great lanternshark (Etmopterus princeps), which has been assigned to the genus but not the species.

Ommatokoita elongata is a 30 mm (1.2 in) long pinkish-white parasitic copepod, frequently found permanently attached to the corneas of the Greenland shark and Pacific sleeper shark. The parasites cause severe visual impairment, but it is thought that the sharks do not rely on keen eyesight for their survival. It was speculated that the copepod may be bioluminescent and thus form a mutualistic relationship with the shark by attracting prey, but this hypothesis has not been verified.
