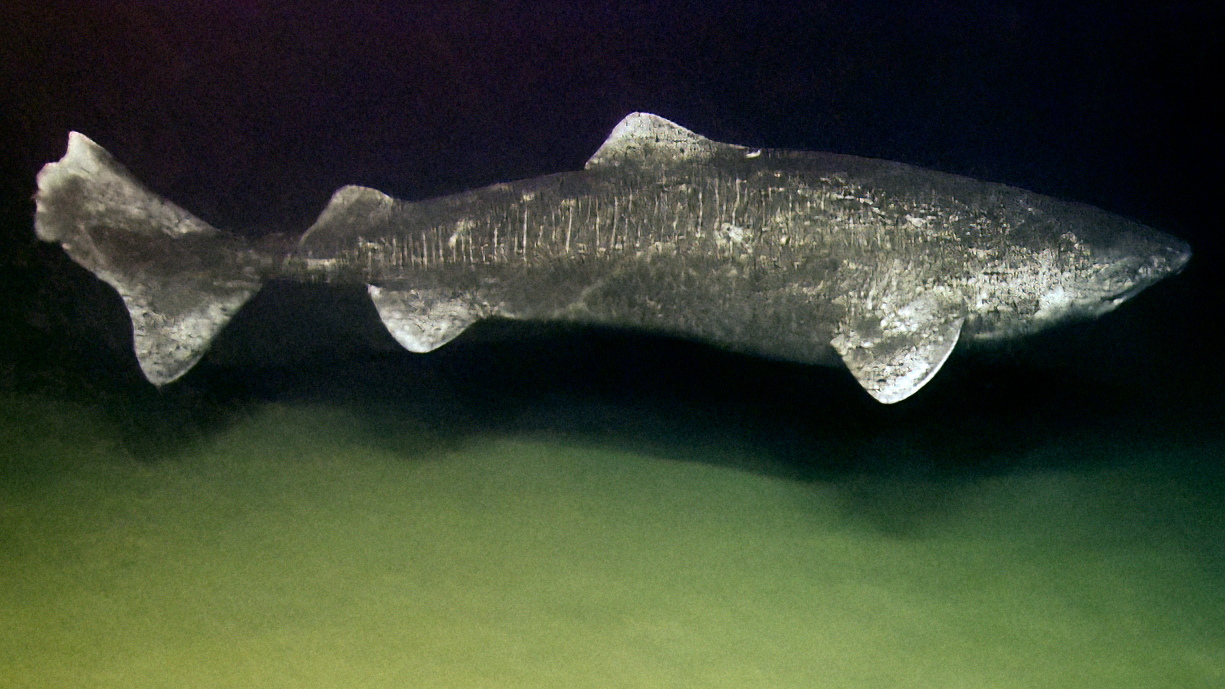

Conservation status
- Vulnerable (IUCN 3.1)

Scientific classification
- Kingdom: Animalia
- Phylum: Chordata
- Class: Chondrichthyes
- Subclass: Elasmobranchii
- Division: Selachii
- Order: Squaliformes
- Family: Somniosidae
- Genus: Somniosus
- Species: S. microcephalus

Binomial name
- Somniosus microcephalus (Bloch & J. G. Schneider, 1801)
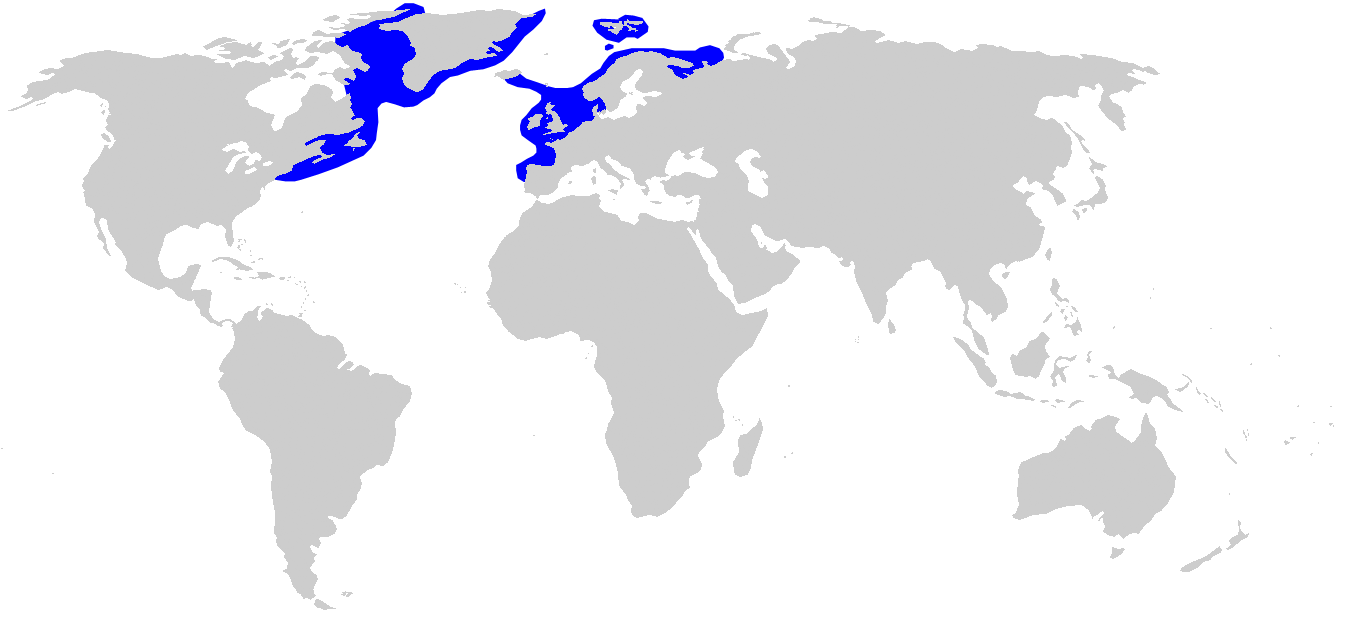
- Range of the Greenland shark

Synonyms
- List: Squalus squatina (non Linnaeus, 1758); Squalus carcharis (Gunnerus, 1776); Squalus microcephalus Bloch & Schneider, 1801; Somniosus brevipinna (Lesueur, 1818); Squalus borealis (Scoresby, 1820); Squalus norvegianus (Blainville, 1825); Scymnus gunneri (Thienemann, 1828); Scymnus glacialis (Faber, 1829); Scymnus micropterus (Valenciennes, 1832); Leiodon echinatum (Wood, 1846)

= Greenland shark =

Species of shark

The Greenland shark (Somniosus microcephalus), also known as the grey shark or gurry shark, is a large shark of the family Somniosidae ("sleeper sharks"), closely related to the Pacific and southern sleeper sharks. Inhabiting the North Atlantic and Arctic Oceans, they are notable for their exceptional longevity, although they are poorly studied because of the depth and remoteness of their natural habitat.

Greenland sharks have the longest lifespan of any known vertebrate, with one study reporting its oldest shark as aged approximately 272 to 510 years. They are among the largest extant shark species, reaching a maximum confirmed length of 6.4 m (21 ft) and weighing more than 1,000 kg (2,200 lb). They reach sexual maturity around 150 years of age and their pups are born alive after an estimated gestation period of 8 to 18 years. The shark is a generalist feeder, consuming a variety of available foods, including carrion.

Greenland shark meat is made toxic to mammals by high levels of trimethylamine N-oxide, although a treated form of it is eaten in Iceland as the pungent delicacy kæstur hákarl. Because they live deep in remote parts of the northern oceans, Greenland sharks are not considered a threat to humans. A possible attack occurred in August 1936 on two British fishermen, but the species was never identified.

== Description ==
The Greenland shark is one of the largest known existing species of shark, with adults growing to around 4 to 5 m (13 to 16 ft). The largest confirmed specimen measured up to 6.4 metres (21 ft) long and weighed around 1,023 kilograms (2,255 lb). The all-tackle International Game Fish Association (IGFA) record for this species is 775 kg (1,709 lb). It rivals the Pacific sleeper shark (possibly up to 7 m or 23 ft long) for the largest species in the family Somniosidae. Genetic data indicate that Greenland sharks diverged from ancestral sleeper sharks in the Canadian Arctic approximately 1–2.34 million years ago during the Pleistocene epoch, likely influenced by glacial fluctuations that periodically isolated marine populations. These ecological challenges may have driven physiological and metabolic adaptations for cold, deep waters.

The Greenland shark is a thickset species, with a short, rounded snout, small eyes, and small dorsal and pectoral fins. The five gill openings are very small for the species's great size. Females are typically larger than males, with males reaching maturity at a smaller size than females.

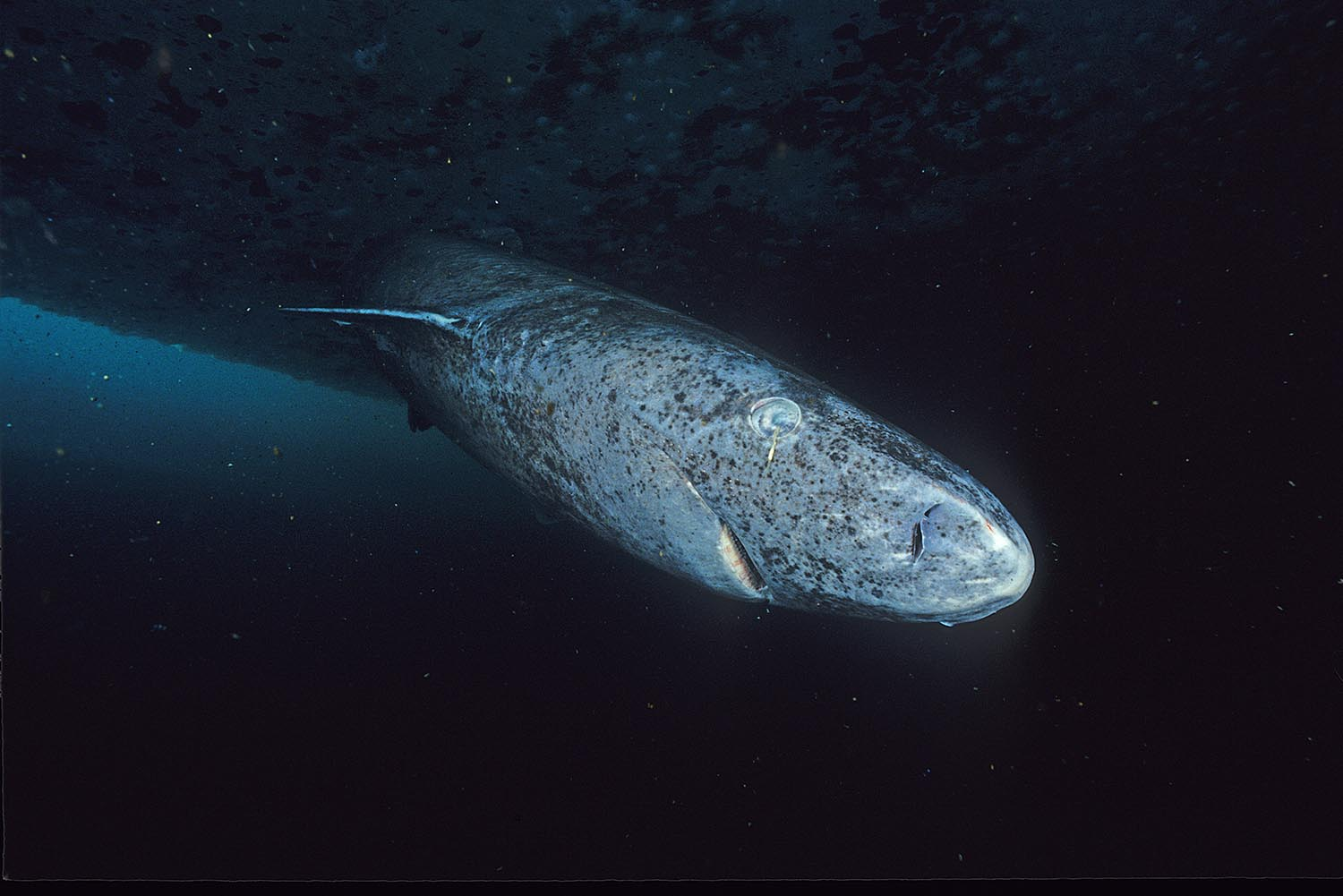
Greenland shark at Admiralty Inlet, Nunavut, with visible Ommatokoita

Coloration can range from pale creamy-gray to blackish-brown and the body is typically uniform in color, though whitish spots or faint dark streaks are occasionally seen on the back.

The shark is often infested by the copepod Ommatokoita elongata, a crustacean that attaches itself to the shark's eyes. The copepod may display bioluminescence, thus attracting prey for the shark in a mutualistic relationship, but this hypothesis has not been verified. These parasites can cause multiple forms of damage to the sharks' eyes, such as ulceration, mineralization, and edema of the cornea, leading to almost complete blindness. This does not seem to reduce the life expectancy or predatory ability of Greenland sharks, due to their strong reliance on smell and hearing.

The genome of the Greenland shark was published in 2024. It is 6.45 billion base pairs in length.

=== Dentition ===
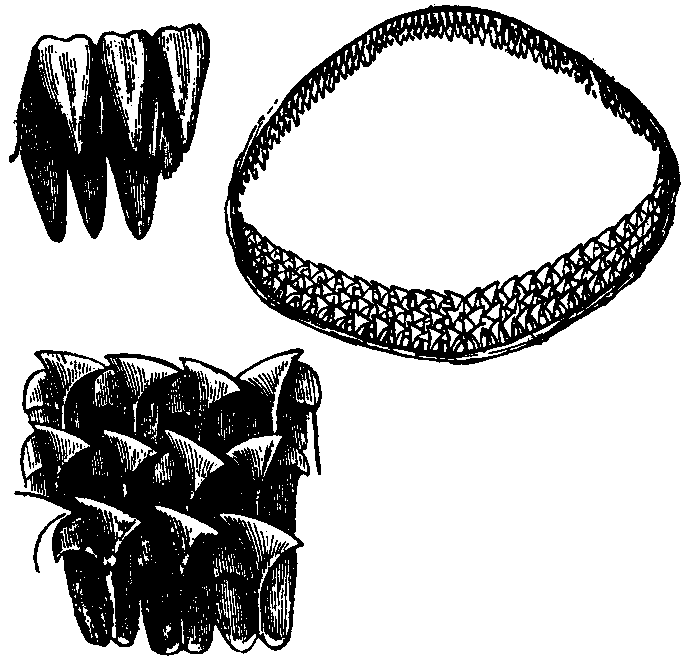
The dentition of a Greenland shark

When feeding on large carcasses, the shark employs a rolling motion of its jaw. The 48 to 52 teeth of the upper jaw are very thin and pointed, lacking serrations. These upper jaw teeth act as an anchor, while the lower jaw proceeds to cut massive chunks out of the prey.

The 48 to 52 lower teeth interlock, are broad and square in shape, and contain short, smooth cusps that point outward. Teeth in the two halves of the lower jaw are strongly pitched in opposite directions.

=== Physiology ===
Like other Elasmobranchii, Greenland sharks have high concentrations of the two nitrogenous compounds urea and trimethylamine N-oxide (TMAO) in their tissues, which increase their buoyancy and function as osmoprotectants. TMAO also counteracts the protein-destabilizing tendencies of urea and deep-water pressure. Its presence in the tissues of both elasmobranch and teleost fish has been found to increase with depth.

The blood of Greenland sharks contains three major types of hemoglobin, made up of two copies of α globin combined with two copies of three very similar β subunits. These three types show very similar oxygenation and carbonylation properties, which are unaffected by urea, an important compound in marine Elasmobranchii physiology. They display identical electronic absorption and resonance in Raman spectroscopy, indicating that their heme-pocket structures are identical or highly similar. The hemoglobins also have a lower affinity for oxygen compared to those of temperate sharks. These characteristics are believed to be adaptations to living at great depths.

When hoisted upon deck, it beats so violently with its tail, that it is dangerous to be near it, and the seamen generally dispatch it, without much loss of time. The pieces that are cut off exhibit a contraction of their muscular fibres for some time after life is extinct. It is, therefore, extremely difficult to kill, and unsafe to trust the hand within its mouth, even when the head is cut off. And, if we are to believe Crantz, this motion is to be observed three days after, if the part is trod on or struck.

— Henry William Dewhurst, The Natural History of the Order Cetacea (1834)

== Biology ==
The Greenland shark prefers cold water temperatures (−1.1 to 7.4 °C (30.0 to 45.3 °F)) and deep water (100–1,200 m (330–3,940 ft)).

As an ectotherm living in a just-above-freezing environment, this species is sluggish and slow moving, with the lowest swim speed and tail-beat frequency for its size across all fish species, which most likely correlates with its very slow metabolism and extreme longevity. It swims at an average of 0.34 m (1 ft 1 in) per second, with its fastest cruising speed reaching about 0.74 m (2 ft 5 in) per second. Because this speed is a fraction of the speed reached by seals (a well-established prey item), biologists are uncertain how the sharks are able to prey on the seals, though the sharks are thought to ambush while seals are asleep.

Like other sharks, the Greenland Shark has a well-developed lateral line system. This system is made up of fluid-filled canals that run beneath their skin, along the sides of their bodies, and over their heads. Small pores connect these canals to the water surrounding them, allowing them to detect vibrations and low-frequency pressure changes caused by movement in the water, such as prey swimming nearby. This is important, as Greenland Sharks live in deep, dark environments that provide no sunlight, where they cannot rely heavily on vision. Due to many Greenland Sharks experiencing eye damage from parasitic copepods, it is possible that vision is not their main, relied-upon sense. Instead, the lateral line, along with their sharp sense of smell, plays a key role in helping them locate prey and move through their environment, despite them being slow swimmers.

Studies have shown that their metabolic enzymes are more active in warmer temperatures.

=== Genetics ===
The Greenland Shark genome has roughly 5.9 billion base pairs, which is one of the largest shark genomes ever sequenced. More than two-thirds of the genes found in the Greenland Shark genome are transposable elements, commonly referred to as jumping genes, which are genes that can self-replicate. These genes often cause issues with normal gene function and lead to mutations and other genetic complications. However, in Greenland Sharks, DNA repair genes are hypothesized to be able to ‘jump’ like transposable elements, helping mitigate the damage caused by the other jumping genes. 81 genes that are unique to the Greenland Shark genome are suggested to be linked to DNA repair.

Because of the parasitic copepods that attach to the Greenland Shark’s eyes, along with the dark and visually obstructed environment, their vision may appear to be useless or impaired. However, the Greenland Sharks’ optic tectum (the brain region responsible for processing visual information) is a similar size to that of other elasmobranchii. Greenland Sharks have a tapetum lucidum, which enhances photon capture in low-light conditions. Greenland Sharks also possess rod-dominated retinas and rely on rod-specific phototransduction genes to be able to see in low-light conditions. The genes responsible for this rod-specific phototransduction include the rh1, sag, gnat1, gucy2f, pde6a, pde6b, pde6d, pde6g, grk1, cnga1, gnb5, rcvrn and gngt1 genes. Furthermore, only one set of cone-specific phototransduction genes (grk7) is found in the Greenland Shark’s genome, confirming its reliance on rod-based vision.

=== Diet ===
As both scavengers and active predators, Greenland sharks have established themselves as apex predators in Arctic ecosystems. They primarily eat fish (herring, salmon, smelt, cod, wolffish, haddock, halibut, redfish, sculpins, lumpfish, and skates) and seals. Some Greenland sharks have been found also to eat minke whale. Small Greenland sharks eat predominantly squid, as well as sea birds, crabs, amphipods, sea snails, brittle stars, sea urchins, and jellyfish. Large Greenland sharks (greater than 200 cm or 79 in) eat prey such as demersal fishes, as well as seals and small cetaceans such as oceanic dolphins and porpoises. The largest of these sharks were found having eaten redfish, as well as other higher trophic level prey.

Because of their slow speeds and low-twitch-speed muscle fiber, Greenland sharks are proposed to hunt marine mammals, such as seals and smaller cetaceans, that are asleep, injured, or sick, as well as scavenging. Regarding most benthic prey, they use their cryptic coloration, approaching prey undetected before closing the remaining distance. Once they get close to their prey, Greenland sharks expand their buccal cavity to create suction, drawing in prey. This suction mechanism is the likely explanation for why the gut contents of Greenland sharks are often of whole prey specimens.

Greenland sharks have also been found with remains of moose, horse, and reindeer (in one case an entire reindeer carcass) in their stomachs. Polar bear remains have also been recovered, though these are thought to be of bears that died from other causes. The Greenland shark is known to be a scavenger and is attracted by the smell of rotting meat in the water. The sharks have frequently been observed lurking around fishing boats and herds of seals.

Although such a large shark could easily consume a human swimmer, the frigid waters it typically inhabits make the likelihood of attacks on people very low. To date only one report exists of human predation by a Greenland shark. Around 1859 in Pond Inlet, Canada, a Greenland shark was caught reportedly containing a human leg in its stomach. This story, however, was never scientifically investigated and remains unverified.

=== Migration ===
Greenland sharks migrate annually based on depth and temperature rather than distance, although some do travel. During the winter, the sharks congregate in the shallows (up to 80° north) for warmth, but migrate separately in summer to the deeps or even farther south. The species has been observed at a depth of 2,200 m (7,200 ft) by a submersible investigating the wreck of the SS Central America that lies about 160 nmi (180 mi; 300 km) east of Cape Hatteras, North Carolina. Daily vertical migration between shallow and deep waters has also been recorded.

Genetic evidence suggests that Greenland sharks historically inhabited deep-sea environments, ranging across panoceanic regions at depths greater than 1,000 m. During the Quaternary period, global cooling influenced thickening sea ice and submerged Arctic landscapes, which likely severed connectivity between the local shark populations. Fluctuating glacial cycles, though, periodically opened opportunities for population mixing, impacting migration patterns and genetic diversity. Today, Greenland sharks are found not only in Arctic and sub-Arctic waters, but also in regions further south, such as the Mid-Atlantic Ridge and the Gulf of Mexico. These findings indicate a wider ecological range than previously thought.

In August 2013, researchers from Florida State University caught a Greenland shark in the Gulf of Mexico at a depth of 1,749 m (5,738 ft), where the water temperature was 4.1 °C (39.4 °F). Four previous records of Greenland shark were reported from Cuba and the northern Gulf of Mexico. A more typical depth range is 0–1,500 m (0–4,900 ft), with the species often occurring in relatively shallow waters in the far north and deeper in the southern part of its range.

In April 2022, a large Somniosus shark was caught and subsequently released on Glover's Reef off the coast of Belize. This shark was identified as being either a Greenland shark or hybrid; Greenland × Pacific sleeper shark. This observation is notable for being the first possible record of a Greenland shark from the Western Caribbean, and being caught on a nearshore coral reef (the only other record of this species from the Caribbean was made from a deep-water habitat off the Caribbean coast of Colombia). The discovery indicates that Greenland sharks may have a wider distribution in the tropics, primarily at greater depths, than previously believed.

=== Life history ===
The Greenland shark has the longest known lifespan of all vertebrates. It is estimated that the species has a lifespan of at least 272 years, with the oldest individual estimated to be 392 ± 120 years of age. Estimates of age were made using radiocarbon dating of crystals within the lenses of their eyes. Greenland sharks are estimated to reach sexual maturity around 150 years of age when females measure around 4.19 ± 0.04 m and males measure around 2.84 ± 0.06 m. One Greenland shark was tagged off the coast of Greenland in 1936 and recaptured in 1952. Its measurements suggest that Greenland sharks grow at a rate of 0.5–1 cm (1/4–1/2 in) per year. Efforts to conserve Greenland sharks are particularly important due to their extreme longevity, long maturation periods, and the heightened population sensitivity of large sharks. There are also efforts to understand exceptional Greenland shark longevity on the molecular level. Several published works suggest that expansion of transposable elements may play a crucial role as does immune enhancement, cancer resistance, DNA repair and unique amino acid substitutions in the globular domain of linker histone H1.0 that might enhance chromatin stability. The longer duration and complexity of the female maturation reflect sex differences in reproductive biology. Females undergo seven distinct maturation stages: immature, developing, ripening, early gravid, midterm gravid, late gravid, and postnatal. Males undergo three stages: immature, maturing, and mature. These additional stages in females are necessary for their larger size, preparation for pregnancy, and the eventual birth of a large number of pups.

==== Reproduction ====
Greenland sharks are born alive (a process known as ovoviviparity) after an estimated gestation period of 8–18 years. This extremely long gestation rate is crucial to understanding effective conservation strategies around the Greenland shark. Given the ongoing fishing pressures on Greenland sharks, their long gestation period and slow reproductive rate may severely limit their ability to recover from overfishing.

Estimates of litter size have varied across studies. Some suggest that this species produces up to 10 pups per litter, each initially measuring some 38–42 cm (15–17 in) in length. Based on these estimates, Greenland sharks may have between 200 and 700 pups during their lifetimes. Within a Greenland shark's uterus, villi serve a key function in supplying oxygen to embryos. Oxygen supply is proposed to be a major limiting factor in the size of litters.

Other studies, however, which take into account ovarian data and analysis of other squaliform shark species, have estimated that Greenland sharks may produce up to 10 pups per litter, each pup measuring from 35–45 cm (14–18 in) in length. The same study also confirms that Greenland shark embryos develop inside the uterus without a placenta.

== Threats ==
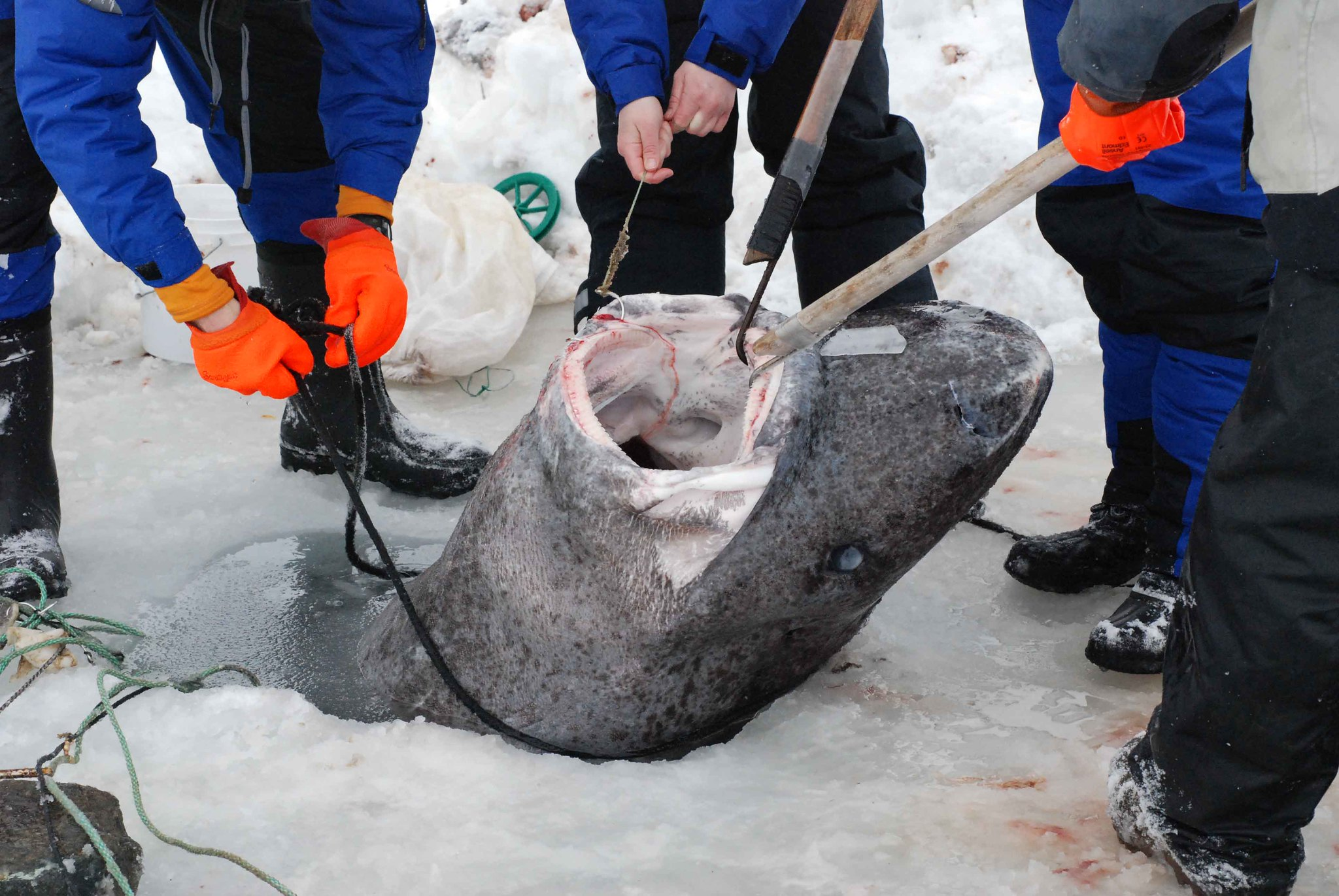
Overfishing and climate change are the main driving factors for the diminishing number of Greenland sharks.

The shark has historically been hunted for its liver oil until the development of synthetic oils and cessation of export of liver oil and skin from Greenland in the 1960s. In the 1970s, the species was seen as a problem for other fisheries in western Norway, and the government subsidized a fishery to reduce the stock of the species. Today, the Greenland shark is primarily caught as bycatch in industrial fisheries. While about 25 are caught per year by artisanal fisheries targeting the species in Iceland, 3,500 are caught annually as bycatch in the Arctic and Atlantic Oceans.

The shark is likely affected by quantity, dynamics, and distribution of Arctic sea ice. The rate of projected loss of sea ice will continue to negatively influence the abundance, distribution, and availability of prey, while at the same time, providing greater access for fishing fleets. A greater potential exists for new fisheries to develop as more productive and abundant southerly species invade the warming Arctic waters.

== Relation to humans ==
=== Conservation and management ===
Greenland sharks are recognized as the longest-living vertebrates on earth. They have a slow growth rate, late maturity period, and low fecundity, making the management and conservation of this species very important. Understanding their exceptionally long gestation period, along with other reproductive and developmental characteristics, is crucial to developing effective conservation strategies for the Greenland shark. Given the ongoing fishing pressures on Greenland sharks, their low productivity and extreme longevity may severely limit their ability to recover from overfishing and bycatch. Therefore, Greenland sharks' longevity and conservative life history traits, in tandem with their vulnerability to accidental catching and commercial fishing, promotes a growing concern for the sustainability of this species.

=== Hákarl ===
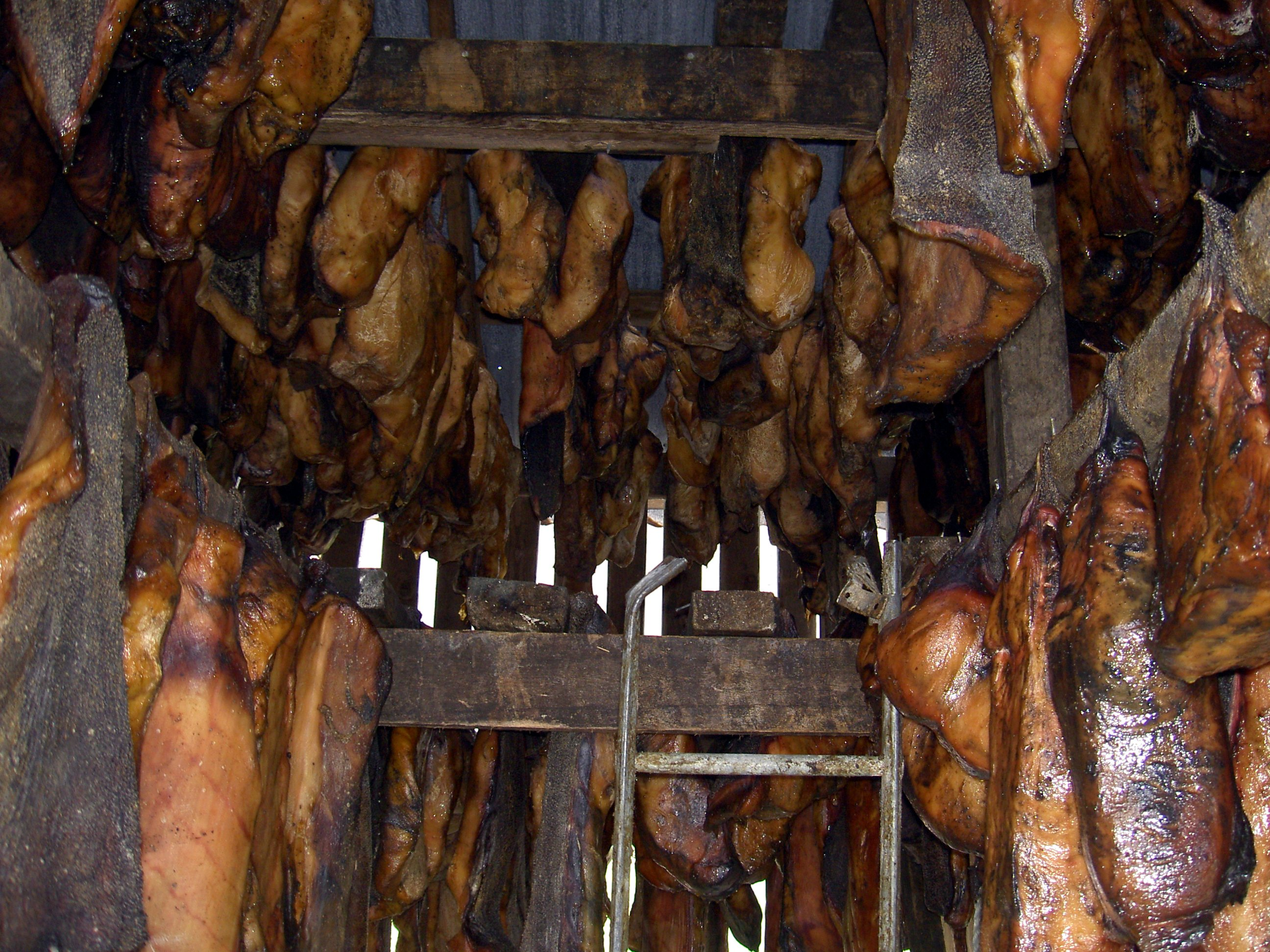
Greenland shark meat or kæstur hákarl in Iceland

The flesh of the Greenland shark is toxic because of the presence of high concentrations of urea and trimethylamine oxide (TMAO). If the meat is eaten without pretreatment, the ingested TMAO is metabolized into trimethylamine, which may be a uremic toxin. Occasionally, sled dogs that eat the flesh are unable to stand because of this effect. Similar toxic effects occur with the related Pacific sleeper shark, but not in most other shark species.

Greenland shark meat is produced and eaten in Iceland, where today it is known as a delicacy called hákarl. To make the shark safe for human consumption, it is first fermented and then dried in a process that can take several months. The shark was traditionally fermented by burying the meat in gravel pits near the ocean for at least several weeks. Now, shark cuts are typically fermented in containers that are perforated to allow liquid to drain. The fermentation process converts urea into ammonia and TMAO into TMA, which then drains as liquid from the meat. The meat is then excavated and hung in strips to dry for several more months.

=== Inuit legends ===
The Greenland shark's poisonous flesh has a high urea content, which gave rise to the Inuit legend of Skalugsuak, the first Greenland shark. The legend says that an old woman washed her hair in urine (a common practice to kill head lice) and dried it with a cloth. The cloth blew into the ocean to become Skalugsuak. Another legend tells of Sedna, whose father cut off her fingers while drowning her, with each finger turning into a sea creature, including Skalugsuak.

The Greenland shark plays a role in cosmologies of the Inuit from the Canadian Eastern Arctic and Greenland. Igloolik Inuit believe that the shark lives within the urine pot of Sedna, goddess of the sea, and consequently, its flesh has a urine-like smell and acts as a helping spirit to shamans.

== See also ==
- Pacific sleeper shark
- Southern sleeper shark
- List of sharks
