= 1916 New Year Honours =

Appointments by King George V to various orders and honours

The New Year Honours 1916 were appointments by King George V to various orders and honours to reward and highlight good works by members of the British Empire. They were announced on 1 January 1916.

A number of the honours were gazetted as being in recognition of the services of officers during the War. These are noted with a # below.

== Victoria Cross ==
- Squadron-Commander Richard Bell Davies, D.S.O., R.N.

== Order of the Garter ==
- The Right Honourable George Nathaniel, Earl Curzon of Kedleston, G.C.S.I., G.C.I.E.
- Right Honourable Victor Christian William, Duke of Devonshire, G.C.V.O.

== Order of the Bath ==
=== Knight Grand Cross (GCB) ===
Civil Division

- The Right Hon. Sir George Houstoun Reid, G.C.M.G.
- Sir Robert Chalmers, K.C.B.

=== Knight Commander (KCB) ===
Military Division

- Vice-Admiral Edward Eden Bradford, C.V.O. #
- Vice-Admiral Herbert Goodenough King-Hall, C.V.O., C.B., D.S.O. #
- Acting Vice-Admiral Charles Edward Madden, C.V.O. #
- Rear-Admiral Rosslyn Erskine Wemyss, C.M.G., M.V.O. #
- Acting Vice-Admiral The Honourable Somerset Arthur Gough-Calthorpe, C.B. #
- Acting Vice-Admiral John Michael de Robeck. #
- Rear-Admiral Dudley Rawson Stratford De Chair, C.B., M.V.O. #
- Acting Vice-Admiral Henry Francis Oliver, C.B., M.V.O. #
- Vice-Admiral Reginald Hugh Spencer Bacon, C.V.O., D.S.O., retired. #
- Temporary Major-General Archibald Paris, C.B., R.M.A. #
- Lieutenant-General Sir Percy Henry Noel Lake, K.C.M.G., C.B., Colonel, The East Lancashire Regiment, Chief of the General Staff, India.
- Major-General Arthur Phayre, C.B., Indian Army, Commanding Secunderabad Division.
- Major-General Fenton John Aylmer, V.C., C.B., Adjutant-General in India.

Civil Division

- Colonel Henry Capel Lofft Holden, C.B., Assistant Director of Supplies and Transport, War Office.
- Ernley Robertson Hay Blackwell, Esq., C.B., Assistant Under Secretary, Home Office.
- Lionel Earle, Esq., C.B., C.M.G., Secretary, H.M. Office of Works.
- Noel Thomas Kershaw, Esq., C.B., Assistant Secretary, Local Government Board.
- Frederick Francis Liddell, Esq., C.B., Second Parliamentary Counsel, The Treasury.

=== Companion (CB) ===
Military Division

- Rear-Admiral Stuart Nicholson, M.V.O. #
- Captain Herbert Arthur Stevenson Fyler, R.N. #
- Captain George Price Webley Hope, R.N. #
- Commodore Algernon Walker Heneage, M.V.O., R.N. #
- Captain the Honourable Algernon Douglas Edward Harry Boyle, M.V.O., R.N. #
- Captain Hughes Campbell Lockyer, R.N. #
- Captain Lionel George Preston, R.N. #
- Engineer Captain William Whittingham, R.N. #
- Engineer Captain Henry Humphreys, R.N. #
- Engineer Commander George Edward Andrew, R.N. #
- Fleet Surgeon Arthur Gaskell, R.N. #
- Fleet Paymaster Hamnet Holditch Share, R.N. #
- Captain Charles Alfred Bartlett, R.N.R., R.D. #
- Colonel (temporary Brigadier-General) John MacNeill Walter, D.S.O., Deputy Adjutant-General, Headquarters, India.
- Colonel (temporary Brigadier-General) Francis John Fowler, D.S.O., Indian Army, Commanding Derajat Brigade.
- Colonel (temporary Brigadier-General) Alexander Henry Eustace, D.S.O., Indian Army, Commanding Kohat Brigade.
- Colonel (temporary Brigadier-General) Wyndham Charles Knight, D.S.O., A.D.C., Indian Army, Commanding Bombay Brigade.
- Colonel (temporary Brigadier-General) Frederick Hopewell Peterson, D.S.O., Indian Army, Commanding Jhelum Brigade.
- Colonel Francis Herbert Sullivan Thomas, Indian Army.
- Colonel Arthur William Cripps, Indian Army, Assistant Director of Supplies and Transport, Lahore Division.
- Colonel (temporary Brigadier-General) Charles Edward Hendley, Indian Army.
- Colonel Edward Hearle Cole, Indian Army.
- Brevet Colonel William Westropp White, Indian Medical Service.

Civil Division

- Rear-Admiral Arthur William Waymouth. #
- Rear-Admiral Morgan Singer. #
- Captain Laurence Eliot Power, M.V.O., R.N. #
- Captain Clement Greatorex, M.V.O., R.N. #
- Lieutenant-Colonel Herbert Edward Blumberg, R.M.L.I. #
- Engineer Rear-Admiral William Henry Riley. #
- Surgeon-General William Henry Norman, R.N. #
- Temporary Surgeon-General Humphry Davy Rolleston, M.D., F.R.C.P., R.N. #
- Honorary Captain Sir Richard Henry Williams-Bulkeley, Bart., R.N.R. #
- Lieutenant-Colonel Charles Orby Shipley, Commanding 3rd Battalion, East Surrey Regiment.
- Lieutenant-Colonel Francis Henry Launcelot Errington, Commanding Inns of Court Officers Training Corps.
- Honorary Brigadier-General Horatio Reginald Mends (Retired Pay), Secretary, West Riding of York Territorial Force Association.
- Major-General John Wallace Carson, Canadian Local Forces. #
- Honorary Brigadier-General Frank Robert Crofton Carleton (Retired Pay), Director of Organisation, War Office. #
- Colonel Willoughby Garnons Gwatkin, Canadian Local Forces. #
- Colonel Charles Philip Martel, Superintendent, Royal Gun and Carriage Factories, Royal Arsenal. #
- Lieutenant-Colonel (temporary Colonel) Lionel Charles Gostling Tufnell, Officer in Charge of Records and Commanding Army Ordnance Corps. #
- Lieutenant-Colonel Charles Edward Phipps, Royal Garrison Artillery Inspection Staff, Royal Arsenal. #
- Montagu Sherard Dawes Butler, Esq., lately Joint Secretary on the Indian Public Services Commission.
- Albert Gray, Esq., K.C., Counsel to the Chairman of Committees, House of Lords.
- Sidney West Harris, Esq., Assistant Secretary, Home Office.
- George Macdonald, Esq., Assistant Secretary, Scotch Education Department.
- Henry Gascoyne Maurice, Esq., Assistant Secretary, Board of Agriculture and Fisheries.
- Walter Frederick Nicholson, Esq., Clerk, The Admiralty.
- Garnham Roper, Esq., Assistant Board of Trade.
- Robert Fitzwilliam Starkie, Esq., Magistrate, Ireland.
- Percy Thompson, Esq., Secretary to the Board of Inland Revenue.
- John Anthony Cecil Tilley, Esq., Chief Clerk, Foreign Office.
- Justin Theodore La Brooy, Esq., Civil Assistant to the Chief Superintendent, Royal Ordnance Factories. #
- Arthur William James MacFadden, Esq., M.B., Chief Inspector of Foods, Local Government Board. #

== Order of Merit ==
- Henry James, Esq.

== Order of the Star of India ==
=== Knight Grand Commander (GCSI) ===
- His Excellency General Sir Beauchamp Duff, G.C.B., K.C.S.I., K.C.V.O., C.I.E., A.D.C. General, Commander-in-Chief of His Majesty's Forces in India.

=== Knight Commander (KCSI) ===
- Sir Steyning William Edgerley, K.C.V.O., C.I.E., Member of the Council of India.
- Harrington Verney Lovett, Esq., C.S.I., Indian Civil Service, Commissioner of the Lucknow Division, United Provinces, and a Member of the Council of the Lieutenant-Governor for making Laws and Regulations.
- Robert Woodburn Gillan, Esq., C.S.I., Indian Civil Service, President of the Railway Board.
- Maharaj Sri Bhairon Singh Bahadur, C.S.I., Vice-President and Political Member of the State Council, Bikaner, Rajputana.

=== Companion (CSI) ===
- Henry Sharp, Esq., C.I.E., Indian Educational Service, Officiating Secretary to the Government of India in the Education Department, and an Additional Member of the Council of the Governor-General for making Laws and Regulations.
- Ludovic Charles Porter, Esq., C.I.E., Indian Civil Service, lately Secretary to the Government of India in the Education Department.
- Robert Russell Scott, Esq., Principal Clerk, The Admiralty, late Joint Secretary, Indian Public Services Commission.
- Lieutenant-Colonel John Walter Edward, Baron Montagu of Beaulieu, V.D., Commandant, 2/7 Hampshire Regiment. #

== Order of Saint Michael and Saint George ==
=== Knight Grand Cross (GCMG) ===
- Lieutenant-General Sir Herbert Scott Gould Miles, G.C.B., C.V.O., Governor and Commander-in-Chief of the City and Garrison of Gibraltar.
- His Highness, Ibrahim, Sultan of the State and Territory of Johore, K.C.M.G. (Honorary)

=== Knight Commander (KCMG) ===
- Sir Edward Marsh Merewether, K.C.V.O., C.M.G., Governor and Commander-in-Chief of the Colony of Sierra Leone.
- William Lamond Allardyce, Esq., C.M.G., Governor and Commander-in-Chief of the Bahama Islands.
- The Honourable William Thomas White, Minister of Finance of the Dominion of Canada.
- The Honourable Thomas Mackenzie, High Commissioner for New Zealand in the United Kingdom.
- The Honourable Sir Charles Kinnaird Mackellar, Knt., Member of the Legislative Council of the State of New South Wales, and lately President of the State Children's Relief Board.
- Collingwood Schreiber, Esq., C.M.G., General Consulting Engineer to the Government of the Dominion of Canada.
- Esme William Howard, Esq., C.V.O., C.M.G., His Majesty's Envoy Extraordinary and Minister Plenipotentiary to His Majesty the King of Sweden.
- The Honourable Lancelot Douglas Carnegie, M.V.O., His Majesty's Envoy Extraordinary and Minister Plenipotentiary to the Portuguese Republic.
- William Edwin Brunyate, Esq., C.M.G., Legal Counsellor to the Egyptian Government.
- Sheikh Said Ali el Morghani, C.M.G. (Honorary)
- Vice-Admiral Frederic Edward Errington Brock, C.B. #
- Vice-Admiral Sackville Hamilton Carden. #
- Vice-Admiral Sir George Edwin Patey, K.C.V.O. #
- Vice-Admiral Arthur Henry Limpus, C.B. #
- Rear-Admiral Cecil Fiennes Thursby, C.M.G. #
- Surgeon-General Sir James Porter, R.N., LL.D., M.D., K.C.B., Honorary Physician to the King. #
- Temporary Surgeon-General Sir William Watson Cheyne, Bart., R.N., M.B., C.B., Honorary Surgeon-in-Ordinary to the King. #

=== Companion (CMG) ===
- Thomas Alexander Vans Best, Esq., Colonial Secretary of the Leeward Islands.
- Thomas Inglis Binnie, Esq., Director of Public Works, Nyasaland Protectorate.
- James Rufus Boose, Esq., Travelling Commissioner, Royal Colonial Institute.
- William Brymner, Esq., President of the Royal Canadian Academy of Arts.
- John Cadman, Esq., D.Sc., Professor of Mining in the University of Birmingham; Petroleum Adviser to the Colonial Office, and Coal Mining Adviser to the Government of Nigeria.
- Lieutenant-Colonel Henry James Grasett, Chief Constable, Toronto.
- The Honourable Victor Albert Nelson Hood, Private Secretary to the Governor of Victoria.
- Surgeon-General Guy Carleton Jones, Director of Medical Services; Canadian Expeditionary Force.
- Brigadier-General James Charles MacDougall, Commanding Canadian Training Division; Canadian Expeditionary Force.
- John Middleton, Esq., M.A., Colonial Secretary of the Colony of Mauritius.
- Charles Frederick Wray Palliser, Esq., Secretary, Office of the High Commissioner for New Zealand.
- Bernard Senior, Esq., I.S.O., Treasurer of the Island of Ceylon.
- Adam Smith, Esq., Unofficial Member of the Legislative Council of the Colony of Trinidad and Tobago.
- Brigadier-General Frederick Hugh Gordon Cunliffe. ("in connection with military operations in the Cameroons.")
- Captain Guy Reginald Archer Gaunt, R.N., Naval Attache to His Majesty's Embassy at Washington.
- Andrew Ryan, Esq., late First Dragoman at His Majesty's Embassy at Constantinople.
- Thomas Harold Lyle, Esq., His Majesty's Consul-General at Bangkok.
- Arthur Hyde Lay, Esq., His Majesty's Consul-General at Seoul.
- Colonel William Hacche Drake, R.A., Adjutant-General for the Soudan.
- Commodore Roger John Brownlow Keyes, C.B., M.V.O., Ad.C. #
- Captain Douglas Lionel Dent, R.N. #
- Commodore Maurice Swynfen Fitzmaurice. #
- Captain Wilfrid Nunn, R.N., D.S.O. #
- Acting Commander Leopold Arthur Bernays, R.N. #
- Temporary Major William Wellington Godfrey, Royal Marine Light Infantry. #
- Major Arthur Edward Bewes, Royal Marine Light Infantry. #

== Order of the Indian Empire ==
=== Knight Grand Commander (GCIE) ===
- His Highness Maharaja Sir Ranbir Singh Bahadur, K.C.S.I., Chief of Jind, Punjab.

=== Knight Commander (KCIE) ===
- Edward Vere Levinge, Esq., C.S.I., Indian Civil Service, an Ordinary Member of the Council of the Lieutenant-Governor of Bihar and Orissa.

=== Companion (CIE) ===
- Major Cecil John Lyons Allanson, Indian Army, lately Military Secretary to His Excellency the Governor of Madras.
- Rao Bahadur Chunilal Hari Lai Setalvad, Second Presidency Magistrate, Bombay.
- John Andrew Turner, Esq., M.D., Executive Health Officer, Bombay Municipality.
- Suresh Prosad Sarbadhikary, Esq., M.D., Calcutta.
- John Norman Taylor, Esq., Public Works Department, Officiating Superintending Engineer, Irrigation Branch, Upper Jhelum Canal, Punjab.
- Khan Bahadur Sardar Din Muhammad Khan, Laghari, late Acting Tumandar of the Laghari tribe in the Dera Ghazi Khan District, Punjab.
- Lionel Linton Tomkins, Esq., Indian Police, Deputy Inspector-General of Police, Criminal Investigation Department, Punjab.
- Douglas Marshall Straight, Esq., Indian Police, Inspector-General of Police, United Provinces, and a Member of the Council of the Lieutenant-Governor for making Laws and Regulations.
- Babu Mot-i Chand, a Member of the Council of the Lieutenant-Governor for making Laws and Regulations.
- Matthew Hunter, Esq., Indian Educational Service, Principal, Rangoon College.
- John Tarlton Whitty, Esq., Indian Civil Service, Magistrate and Collector of Gaya, Bihar and Orissa.
- Moses Mordecai Simeon Gubbay, Esq., Indian Civil Service, Deputy Secretary to the Government of India in the Finance Department, and lately Wheat Commissioner for India.
- Lieutenant-Colonel Charles Augustus Muspratt-Williams, Royal Artillery, Chief Inspector of Explosives with the Government of India.
- Raja Bhagwat Raj Bahadur Singh, of Sohawal, Central India.
- Lieutenant-Colonel Robert Charles MacWatt, Indian Medical Service, Chief Medical Officer, Rajputana, and Civil Surgeon, Ajmer.
- George Paris Dick, Esq., Government Advocate, Central Provinces.
- Horatio Norman Bolton, Esq., Indian Civil Service, Deputy Commissioner, Peshawar District, North-West Frontier Province.
- Major William John Keen, Indian Army, Political Agent, Dir, Swat and Chitral, North-West Frontier Province.
- Major William Magill Kennedy, Indian Army, President of the Assam Labour Board.
- Khan Bahadur Sheikh Makbul Hosain, United Provinces Provincial Service, Revenue Minister in the Kashmir State.
- Colonel (temporary Brigadier-General) Cyril Harcourt Roe, Director of Movements and Quarterings, Quartermaster-General's Branch, Army Headquarters, India. #
- Colonel (temporary Brigadier-General) Offley Bohun Stovin Fairless Shore, C.B., D.S.O., Director of Staff Duties and Military Training, Army Headquarters, India. #
- Lieutenant-Colonel George Sim Ogg, Royal Artillery, Superintendent, Gun and Shell Factory, Cossipore. #
- Major Charles Hugh Hodges Nugent, Royal Engineers, Inspector of Machinery, Military Works Services, India. #
- Commander Michael Warren Farewell, Royal Indian Marine, Port Officer and Marine Transport Officer, Karachi. #
- Major John Bertram Cunliffe, Madras Artillery Volunteers. #
- Temporary Captain Evelyn Berkeley Howell, Special List, Censor of Indian Mails with the Indian Expeditionary Force in France. #

== Royal Victorian Order ==
=== Knight Grand Cross (GCVO) ===
- The Honourable Sir Derek William George Keppel, K.C.V.O., C.M.G., C.I.E., Master of the Household to His Majesty.

=== Knight Commander (KCVO) ===
- Richard Maximilian, Baron Acton, M.V.O., late Lord in Waiting to His Majesty.
- Lieutenant-Colonel Sir James Robert Dunlop-Smith, K.C.S.I., C.I.E., Political Aide-de-Camp to the Secretary of State for India.
- Surgeon-General Sir Anthony Alfred Bowlby, K.C.M.G., F.R.C.S., Surgeon in Ordinary to His Majesty.

=== Commander (CVO) ===
- William Rose Smith, Esq., C.B., Clerk of the Council of the Duchy of Lancaster.

=== Member, 4th Class ===
- John George Griffiths, Esq., Honorary Secretary, King Edward's Hospital Fund for London.
- Staff Surgeon Robert Joseph Willan, R.N.V.R. (Dated 10 November 1915.)

== Imperial Service Order (ISO) ==
Home Civil Service

- John Hobson Aitken, Esq., Chief Clerk to the Government Office, Isle of Man.

== King's Police Medal (KPM) ==
England and Wales

Police Forces

- Captain Fullarton James, Chief Constable of Northumberland.
- Captain Jasper G. Mayne, Chief Constable of East Suffolk.
- Henry Riches, Chief Constable of Middlesbrough.
- Captain Lindsay Robert Burnett, Chief Constable of the Wolverhampton Borough Police.
- George William Bailey, Superintendent, Kingston-upon-Hull City Police.
- James Bardwell, Superintendent and Deputy Chief Constable, West Suffolk Constabulary.
- John Clamp, Superintendent, Derby Borough Police.
- John James, Superintendent and Deputy Chief Constable, Pembrokeshire Constabulary.
- John Foulger Page, Superintendent and Deputy Chief Constable, East Suffolk Police.
- Young Sainsbury, Superintendent, Gloucestershire Constabulary.
- Donald Waters, Superintendent, Metropolitan Police.
- Albert Handley, Cecil Smithers, Sergeants, Metropolitan Police.
- Walter Carpenter, John Dew, Fred Drabble, Albert Hughes, Charles Kemp, Constables, Metropolitan Police.
- Jack Monks, Constable, Blackpool Police.

Fire Brigades

- William George Swanton, Deputy Superintendent, Newcastle-on-Tyne Fire Brigade.
- G. A. Henley, Fireman, London Fire Brigade.

Scotland

Police Forces

- Charles Harding, Chief Constable of the Renfrewshire Constabulary.
- James Ross, Superintendent and Deputy Chief Constable, Argyllshire Constabulary.
- William Moodie, Superintendent, Edinburgh Police.
- Archibald Swan, Inspector, Glasgow City Police.

Fire Brigades

- William Waddell, Chief Officer of the Glasgow Fire Brigade.
- William Allan, Superintendent, Edinburgh Fire Brigade.

Ireland

- Albert Augustine Roberts, County Inspector, Royal Irish Constabulary.
- Timothy Murphy, Head Constable, Royal Irish Constabulary.

India

- Richard Howard Hitchcock, Superintendent, fifth grade, Madras Police.
- Leslie Withinshaw, Acting Superintendent, Madras Police.
- Lakshmaua Rao, Probationary Sub-Inspector, Madras Police.
- Ellati Valiagatti Amu, Sub-Inspector, third grade, Madras Police.
- John Moore, Superintendent, fourth grade, Madras Police.
- Jack Elliott, Assistant Superintendent, second grade, Madras Police.
- Tharmapuram Venkatarama Ayyar Krishnaswami Ayyar, 2nd class Inspector, Madras Police.
- Abhiramapuram K Rajah Ayyar. Deputy-Superintendent of Police, third grade, Madras Police.
- Govindan Nayar, Head Constable, first grade, Madras Police.
- Edmond Harvey Sullivan, Officiating District Superintendent, Madras Police.
- Wilfred Henry Luck, Deputy Inspector-General of Police for Sind, Bombay Police.
- F. C. Griffith, Deputy Commissioner of Police, Criminal Investigation Department, Bombay City Police.
- Simon Favel, Inspector of Police, Criminal Investigation Department, Bombay City Police.
- Abdul Wahab Walad Shaik Fajee, First Grade Head Constable, G.I.P . Railway Police, Bombay Police.
- Khan Saheb Muhammad Faizullah Muhammad Taki, Inspector, Criminal Investigation Department, Bombay Police.
- J. Acton, Third Grade Inspector of Police, Ahmedabad, Bombay Police.
- Dhondu Narayan, Constable, Bombay City Police.
- Oswald Allen Harker, Deputy Commissioner, Bombay City Police.
- John Joseph Stenson, Inspector, Bombay City Police.
- William Thomas Moore, Deputy Inspector-General, Bengal Police.
- Trevor Claude Simpson, Superintendent, Bengal Police.
- Lionel Hewitt Colson, Superintendent, Bengal Police.
- Keramat Husain, Head Constable, Bengal Police.
- Elliot Kaye, Superintendent, United Provinces Police.
- Bashir Husain, Sub-Inspector, United Provinces Police.
- H. V. B. Scott, Superintendent, Punjab Police.
- A. W. Mercer, Superintendent, Punjab Police.
- J. F . Coatman, Assistant Superintendent, Punjab Police.
- Abdul Aziz, Inspector, Punjab Police
- Sardar Liaqat Hayat Khan, Deputy Superintendent, Punjab Police.
- Amir Ali, Inspector, Punjab Police.
- Fazil Imam, Sub-Inspector, Criminal Investigation Department, Punjab Police.
- Amar Singh, Sub-Inspector, Punjab Police. Sher Mohammad, Head Constable, No. 68 of the Dera Ghazi Khan District, Punjab Police.
- Phuman Singh, Foot Constable, Punjab Police.
- Edward Cheke Smalley Shuttleworth, Superintendent, Rangoon Town Police.
- Nawab Ali, Head Constable, third grade, Burma Police.
- Daim Khan, Head Constable, second grade, Burma Police.
- Maung Mo Zwe, Head Constable, first grade, and officiating Sub-Inspector of Police, sixth grade, Burma Police.
- Maung San Baw, Constable, Burma Police.
- Sukraj Limbu, Subadar, Burma Military Police.
- Maung Aung Ban, A.T.M., Deputy Superintendent, first grade, Burma Police.
- Lieutenant-Colonel Albert Edward Woods, C.S.I., Inspector-General, Assam Police.
- Hirarup Sahi, Jemadar, Lushai Hills Military Police Battalion, Assam Military Police.
- Muhammad Akbar, Officiating Sub-Inspector, fifth grade, North-West Frontier Police.
- Khan Sahib Boi Khan, Subadar Major, Frontier Constabulary, North-West Frontier Police.
- William Alfred Gayer, Deputy Inspector-General, His Highness the Nizam's Government, Hyderabad Police.
- Subhan Khan, Constable, Ajmer-Merwara Police.
- Abbas Raza Khan, Sub-Inspector, Baluchistan Police.
- Gulab Shah, Mounted Head Constable, first grade, Baluchistan Police.
- Sant Singh, Sub-Inspector, Punjab Police.

Colonial Forces

- Andrew John O'Byrne, Constable, South African Police.
- William Smith, Inspector of Police, Tasmania.
- Percy John Ernest Grant, Sergeant of Police, Tasmania.
- John Watson, Constable of Police, Tasmania.
- U. M. Kalu Banda, Constable, Ceylon Police Force.
- Mohamed Ali bin Nabi, Constable, Singapore Police Force.
- Bela Singh, Constable, Federated Malay States Police Force.
- Johnson Osuji Njemanze, Inspector, Police Force of the Southern Provinces, Nigeria.
- Samagi, Corporal No. 267, Police Force of the Southern Provinces, Nigeria.
- Nyama, Lance-Corporal No. 346, Police Force of the Southern Provinces, Nigeria.

== Distinguished Service Cross (DSC) ==
- Flight Sub-Lieutenant Gilbert Formby Smylie, R.N. #
- Lieutenant Humphrey John Lancaster, R.N. #
- Lieutenant Robert Jardine Carruthers, R.N.V.R. #
- Sub-Lieutenant Alexander Daniells, R.N.R. #
- Sub-Lieutenant George Grimshaw Rose, R.N.R. #
- Sub-Lieutenant William Quinn McKeown. #
- Sub-Lieutenant Harry Beedle, R.N.R. #
- Gunner (T) Arthur Samuel Edmund Roberts, R.N. #
- Artificer-Engineer Arthur Lewis Shaw, R.N. #
- Skipper Frederick Wink, R.N.R. #
- Skipper Francis McPherson, R.N.R. #
- Lieutenant Ralph Daniel Blyth Haddon, R.N. #
- Lieutenant Arthur William Lancelot Brewill, R.N. #
- Captain (now Major) George Leonard Raikes, R.M.A. #
- Captain William Noel Stokes, R.M.A. #
- Captain George Pinckard Lathbury, R.M.L.I. #
- Temporary Captain Frank Summers, R.M. #
- Acting Lieutenant Harold Roger Lambert, R.M. #
- Temporary Lieutenant Thomas Cuming, R.M. #
- Acting Lieutenant Francis Cecil Law, R.M. #
- Midshipman Hugh Beckett Anderson, R.N. #

== Distinguished Service Order (DSO) ==
- Commander (Acting Captain) Richard Huth Walters, R.N. #
- Commander Edgar Robert Morant, R.N. #
- Lieutenant-Commander (Acting Commander) Walter Geoffrey Rigg, R.N. #
- Lieutenant-Commander (Acting Commander) Gervase William Heaton Heaton, R.N. #
- Engineer-Commander John Carmichael, R.N.R. #
- Lieutenant-Commander Norman Malet Colquhoun Thurstan, R.N. #
- Lieutenant William Victor Rice, R.N. #
- Captain Charles Penrose Rushton Coode, R.N. #
- Commander Raymond Fitzmaurice, R.N. #
- Commander Ralph Stuart Sneyd, R.N.#
- Commander Robert Herbert Wilfrid Rhodes R.D., R.N.R. #
- Lieutenant-Commander Kenneth Mervyn Bruce, R.N. #
- Lieutenant Wilfrid Bayley Pirie, R.N. #
- Captain Edwin Harold Barr, R.M.A. #
- Temporary Captain Henry Meredith Leaf,. R.M.#
- Flight Sub-Lieutenant James Brian Patrick Ferrand, R.N. #
- Flight Sub-Lieutenant Taunton Elliott Viney, R.N. #
- Le Lieutenant en second Colley Saint-Paul Comte de Sincay (Honorary)

== Distinguished Service Medal (DSM) ==
- Chief Petty Officer William Westborough, O.N.145272 (R.F.R. Dev. A/3287). #
- Able Seaman Bezelell Jones, Mercantile Rating. #
- Chief Engine-room Artificer, 1st Class, Albert Edgar Abraham, O.N.268771. #
- Chief Petty Officer William Grant, O.N. 195507. #
- Able Seaman George Broomfield, O.N. 237502. #
- Petty Officer Samuel Robert Saul Chamberlain, O.N.195022. #
- Leading Seaman George William Tomsett, O.N.184462 (R.F.R. Ch.B/3055). #
- Leading Seaman Walter Robert Francis, O.N.231988. #
- Trimmer Christopher Pratt, R.N. Trawler Reserve, O.N.3680 T.S. #
- Leading Stoker Andrew Martin, O.N.289335 (R.F.R. Po.B/3653). #
- Engineman Frank Munro, R.N. Trawler Re- serve, O.N.3 E.S. #
- Stoker Petty Officer Thomas H. Lawrence, O.N.K.1106. #
- Yeoman of Signals Arthur Henry Hogbin, O.N.209010 (R.F.R. Ch.B/10824). #
- Chief Petty Officer Arthur Frederick Hears, O.N.143768 (R.F.R. Ch.A/1862). #
- Petty Officer, 1st Class, William Frederick Harris, O.N.119424 (R.F.R. Dev. A/2350). #
- Deck Hand John Donaldson, R.N. Trawler Reserve, O.N.6544 D.A. #
- Petty Officer, 1st Class, Charles Stuart Masters, O.N.178072 (R.F.R. Ch.B/5425). #
- Engineman Alderman Cooper, R.N. Trawler Reserve, O.N.2760 E.S. #
- Deck Hand Charles Henry Payee Drury, R.N. Trawler Reserve, O.N.649 D.A. #
- Stoker Petty Officer Henry Williams, O.N.309953. #
- Chief Petty Officer Charles Matthew Cleveland, O.N.124057 (R.F.R. Ch.A/1510). #
- Able Seaman Harry Elliott, O.N.229460. #
- Boy Telegraphist Alex Bernard Keune, O.N.J30036. #
- Seaman Christopher Kelly, R.N.R., O.N. 7806 A. #
- Able Seaman James Tyrrel Turner, R.N.V.R., London, Z.470. #
- Able Seaman Patrick Joseph' Welsh, Mercantile Rating. #
- Petty Officer, 1st Class, Frederick Felix Lynch, O.N.149593 (R.F.R. Ch.B/5969). #
- Second Hand Frederick Gibson, R.N. Trawler Reserve, O.N.76 D.A. #
- Second Hand James Bell, R.N. Trawler Reserve, O.N.372 S.A. #
- Deck Hand Frederick Hewitt, R.N. Trawler Reserve, O.N.1459 D.A. #
- Deck Hand Alexander Gumming Thomson, R.N. Trawler Reserve, O.N.1460 D.A. #
- Deck Hand Roger Brown Martin, R.N. Trawler Reserve, O.N.1377 D.A. #
- Deck Hand Arthur Burnard Mooney, R.N. Trawler Reserve, O.N.3184 D.A. #
- Deck Hand James McAllister Burnett, R.N. Trawler Reserve, O.N.1215 D.A. #
- Second Hand Joseph Foley, R.N. Trawler Reserve, O.N.80 D.A. #
- Chief Armourer Telford Anthony, O.N. 342614. #
- Chief Petty Officer Austin Jesse Emms, O.N.152170. #
- Chief Electrical Artificer, 2nd Class, William Arthur Ellis, O.N.346013. #
- Petty Officer Abercrombie Blunden, O.N. 182407. #
- Petty Officer Charles Fredrick Munds, O.N. 198331. #
- Petty Officer Robert Almond White, O.N. 189413. #
- Leading Seaman James Peter Travil, O.N. 215206. #
- Chief Petty Officer Charles Herbert Porter, O.N.172059. #
- Petty Officer William Joseph Brown, O.N. 160889. #
- Chief Petty Officer Henry Edward Saunders, O.N.161556. #
- Acting Chief Engine Room Artificer, 2nd Class, Robert Mills, O.N. 271072. #
- Petty Officer Robert Moth, O.N. 220366. #
- Chief Petty Officer William Henry Stamp,. O.N. 173,412.#
- Petty Officer Daniel Garrett, O.N. 181,495. #
- Able Seaman Edmund Charles Aslett, O.N. 236,458. #
- Able Seaman Ernest Alfred Hobbs, O.N. 224,576. (R.F.R. Ch. B/8236.) #
- Able Seaman Ernest Hall, O.N. SS.3771. #
- Acting Serjeant-Major William Thomas Clarke, No. R.M.A. 6475. #
- Gunner Robert McCurrach, No. R.M.A. 12045. #
- Gunner Harry James Messum, No. R.M.A. 9579. (R.F.R. 1295.) #
- Air Mechanic, 1st Class, George Thomas Oldfield. #
- Leading Seaman William Norman, O.N. 184442. #
- Petty Officer Thomas James Butland, O.N. 193117. #
- Stoker Petty Officer William Coyte, O.N. 276228. #
- Able Seaman Albert Victor Cornish, O.N. J.4508. #
- Petty Officer Hugh McKenzie, O.N. 195365. #
- Leading Seaman Samuel Peck, O.N. 208367. (R.F.R. Dev. B/4695.) #
- Serjeant (Road Inspector) Alfred Chouffot, No. R.M.A./99(S), R.N.D., Motor Transport Company. #
- Officier-marinier Francois Billois, pilote d'avion, Dunkerque Naval Aeroplane Squadron. #

== Royal Red Cross (RRC) ==
- Miss Margaret Clothilde Macdonald, Matron-in-Chief, Canadian Nursing Service.
