= Viney =

Viney is a female first name and surname. Notable people with this name include:

== Last name ==
- Alexandra Viney (born 1992), Australian Paralympic rower
- Allan Viney (1919–2008), Australian politician
- Doug Viney (born 1976), New Zealand boxer and kickboxer
- Jack Viney (born 1994), Australian rules football player; son of Todd
- Jay Viney (born 1968), Australian rules football player
- John Viney (1786/87–1856), English luggage manufacturer
- Keith Viney (born 1957), English association football player
- Matt Viney (born 1954), Australian politician
- Michael Viney (born 1933), Irish environmentalist and nature writer
- Moses Viney (1817–1909), American escaped slave
- Paul Viney (born 1949), British auctioneer and valuer
- Ron Viney (born 1949), Australian rules football player
- Sophie Viney (born 1974), English composer
- Taunton Elliott Viney (1891–1916), British Royal Navy aviator
- Todd Viney (born 1966), Australian rules football player, coach, and manager; father of Jack
- William M. Viney, American civil rights activist and politician

== Middle name ==
- Leicester Viney Vernon (1798–1860), British politician

== See also ==
- Viney Mountain, a summit in West Virginia, United States
