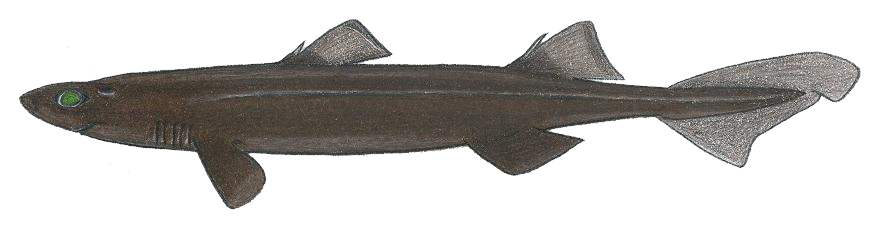

Conservation status
- Least Concern (IUCN 3.1)

Scientific classification
- Kingdom: Animalia
- Phylum: Chordata
- Class: Chondrichthyes
- Subclass: Elasmobranchii
- Division: Selachii
- Order: Squaliformes
- Family: Etmopteridae
- Genus: Centroscyllium
- Species: C. fabricii

Binomial name
- Centroscyllium fabricii (Reinhardt, 1825)
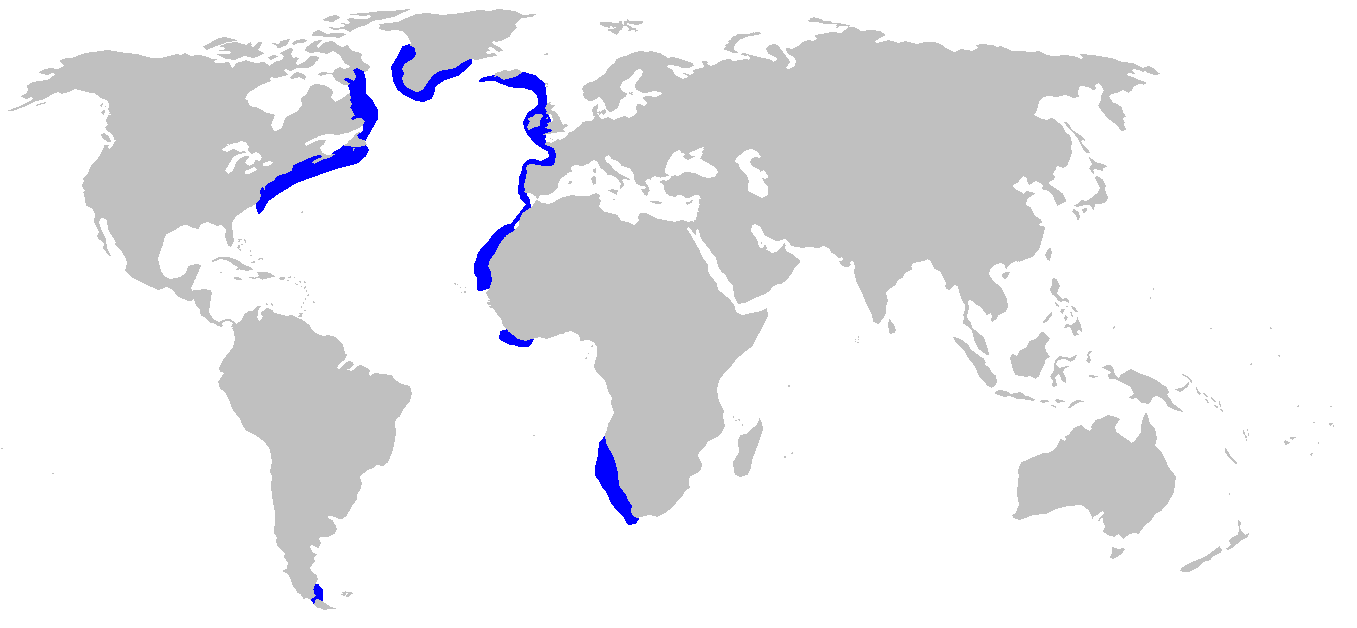
- Range of the black dogfish

Synonyms
- Spinax fabricii Reinhardt, 1825

= Black dogfish =

Species of shark

The black dogfish (Centroscyllium fabricii) is a species of dogfish shark in the family Etmopteridae. It is common over the outer continental shelf and continental slope at depths of 180–2,250 m (590–7,380 ft). Females generally inhabit deeper water than males, and depending on the region, smaller sharks may occur at different depths than larger ones. This species is distributed widely in the Atlantic Ocean, from Greenland and Iceland to Virginia and West Africa in the north, and off southwestern Africa and Argentina in the south. The largest member of its family, the black dogfish, typically measures 60–75 cm (24–30 in) long. It has a stocky, dark brown body that is darker below than above, and bears scattered, minute bioluminescent organs. Its two dorsal fins are preceded by stout spines, and the anal fin is absent.

Active and schooling, the black dogfish is an opportunistic predator and scavenger that mainly consumes bony fishes, crustaceans, and cephalopods. It is aplacental viviparous, with females producing litters of four to 40 pups that are sustained to term by a yolk sac. There is no well-defined breeding season, and mating and birthing take place year-round. The black dogfish contributes significantly to the bycatch of deep-sea commercial fisheries operating in the North Atlantic; it is of little commercial value and is usually discarded. As large portions of its range see little deepwater fishing activity and its northwestern Atlantic population seems to be stable, the International Union for Conservation of Nature has listed this species under Least Concern overall. It has been assessed as Near Threatened in the northeastern Atlantic, where its numbers may have declined from heavy fishing pressure.

== Taxonomy and phylogeny ==
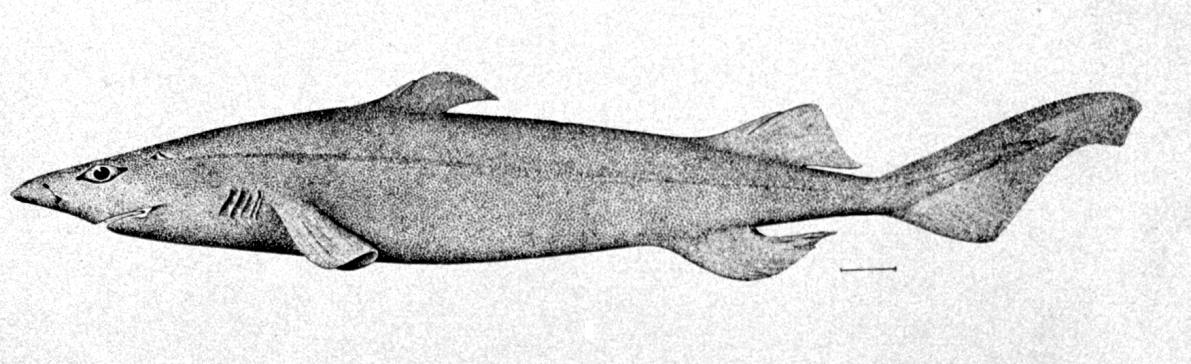
Early illustration of a black dogfish

The first known specimen of the black dogfish was collected near Julianehåb in Greenland and described by Danish zoologist Johannes Reinhardt in his 1825 Ichthyologiske bidrag. Reinhardt gave it the name Spinax fabricii in honor of missionary and naturalist Otto Fabricius, who pioneered the study of Greenlandic fishes. German biologists Johannes Müller and Jakob Henle, in their 1839–41 Systematische Beschreibung der Plagiostomen, created the new genus Centroscyllium for this species.

According to the IUCN, further taxonomic investigation is required to confirm the black dogfish in the North Atlantic and the southeastern Atlantic represent the same species. A 2010 phylogenetic study by Nicolas Straube and colleagues, based on nuclear and mitochondrial DNA, found the black dogfish is the sister species of the whitefin dogfish (C. ritteri), and the two are, in turn, sister to the clade formed by the granular dogfish (C. granulatum) and combtooth dogfish (C. nigrum).

== Distribution and habitat ==
The black dogfish is a common species, with a wide but discontinuous distribution in the temperate waters of the Atlantic Ocean; its range abuts, but does not extend into, the Arctic Ocean. In the northeast, it occurs from Iceland to Sierra Leone, including the Faroe Islands, southern Norway, and the Rockall Trough and Porcupine Seabight off Ireland. In the northwest, it is found from southern Greenland and Baffin Island to Virginia, being particularly abundant in the Laurentian Channel, and may occur further south to the Gulf of Mexico off Alabama. In the southeast, it is found off Namibia and South Africa as far as Cape Agulhas. In the southwest, it has been recorded from the Beagle Channel at the southern tip of Argentina.

Inhabiting the outer continental shelf and continental slope, the black dogfish is found mostly near the bottom in water 180–2,250 m (590–7,380 ft) deep. It is most common at depths of 800–1,200 m (2,600–3,900 ft) off Iceland, 1,250–1,500 m (4,100–4,920 ft) in the Rockall Trough, 500–1,300 m (1,600–4,300 ft) off Greenland, 350–500 m (1,150–1,640 ft) off northern Canada, and below 500 m (1,600 ft) off southern Africa. The species may venture closer to the surface in the northern extreme of its range, particularly during the dark, cold winter months. Depth segregation by sex has been documented in the North Atlantic, with females outnumbering males at depths greater than 1 km (0.62 mi). Depth segregation by size varies by region: larger sharks are generally found in deeper water off western Greenland, in shallower water off western Iceland, and without pattern with respect to depth off eastern Iceland. The black dogfish prefers water temperatures of 3.5–4.5 °C (38.3–40.1 °F), though off northern Canada, it is most abundant in water of 5–6.5 °C (41.0–43.7 °F); it can tolerate temperatures down to 1 °C (34 °F). There is some evidence that this species conducts seasonal migrations, spending winter and spring in shallower water. Sharks off northern Canada perform development-related movements (see below) not observed off western Greenland, suggesting the presence of two distinct stocks in the northwestern Atlantic.

== Description ==
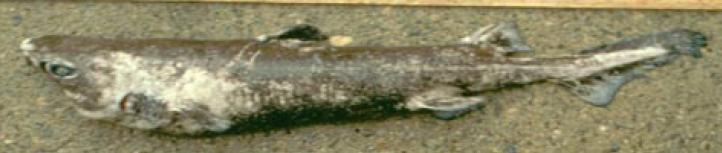
The black dogfish has a stout, dark brown body and large green eyes; this specimen has light patches where its dermal denticles have rubbed off from handling.

Adult black dogfish typically measure 60–75 cm (24–30 in) in length and can reach 1.1 m (3.6 ft), making it the largest member of its family. Females attain a larger ultimate size than males. The shark has a rather stocky and laterally compressed body, with a moderately long, thick, and flattened snout that forms a very broad arch at the front. The sizable, horizontally oval eyes are a reflective green in life and lack nictitating membranes (protective third eyelids); they are followed a short distance behind by much smaller spiracles (accessory respiratory openings). The nostrils are anteriorly placed and preceded by short flaps of skin. The mouth is wide and evenly arched, with thin lips and short but deep furrows around the corners. There are around 34 tooth rows in either side of both jaws; each tooth has three (occasionally up to five) slender cusps, with the central one the longest.

Both dorsal fins are immediately preceded by stout, grooved spines, with the second much longer than the first. The small first dorsal fin has a rounded apex and a nearly straight trailing margin, with its origin lying behind the pectoral fins. The second dorsal fin is rather angular and has about double the area of the first, with its origin located opposite the midpoint of the pelvic fin bases. The pectoral fins are small and rounded. The pelvic fins are about as large as the second dorsal fin, with rounded tips and nearly straight trailing margins. The caudal peduncle is short and leads to a broad caudal fin comprising less than a quarter of the total length; the upper lobe has a convex upper margin leading to a squared-off tip, while the lower lobe is indistinct. The skin is densely covered by tiny dermal denticles; each one is recurved and thornlike, rising from an irregular star-shaped base. This species is a plain dark brown above, darkening to almost black below, with white dorsal fin spines. Juvenile sharks have white edges on the dorsal, pectoral, and pelvic fins. Minute, luminescent dots are scattered about the skin without a regular pattern.

== Biology and ecology ==
The black dogfish forms shoals or schools that tend to be larger during the winter and spring. Though fairly active, its swimming muscles exhibit lower activity of glycolytic enzymes and higher activity of creatine phosphokinase compared to the shallow-water spiny dogfish (Squalus acanthias), suggesting a lesser capacity for bursts of speed. The lipid-filled liver comprises about one-fifth of its total weight and functions in maintaining neutral buoyancy. Potential predators of the black dogfish are larger sharks and bony fishes. It is one of several deep-sea sharks parasitized by the barnacle Anelasma squalicola, which attaches in front of the second dorsal fin and impairs the reproductive development of its host. Other known parasites of this species include the fluke Otodistomum cestoides, the copepods Neoalbionella fabricii and Neoalbionella centroscyllii, and the protozoans Haemogregarina delagei and Trypanosoma rajae.

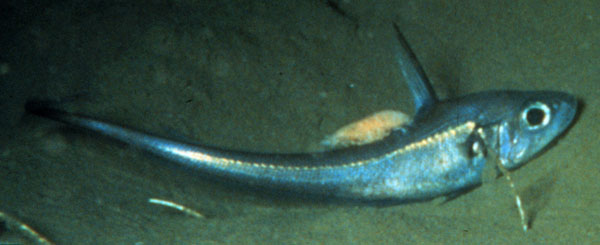
Rattails are among the prey consumed by the black dogfish.

Apparently opportunistic in feeding habits, the black dogfish typically hunts in open water, but also scavenges off the bottom. The bulk of its diet consists of a variety of bony fishes, including rattails, whitings, rockfishes, lanternfishes, and barracudinas, as well as pelagic crustaceans such as krill and shrimp, and cephalopods. Fish become a progressively more important food source as the shark ages, while crustaceans become less important. Infrequently, polychaete worms and jellyfish are also eaten. In the northwestern Atlantic, Greenland halibut (Reinhardtius hippoglossoides) and rattail offal discarded from fishing vessels have become a major source of food for this species, particularly for older sharks that are capable of consuming larger pieces such as heads.

=== Life history ===
Reproduction in the black dogfish occurs year-round, with no well-defined seasonal pattern. This species is aplacental viviparous, in which the developing embryos are retained inside the uterus and are sustained to term solely by yolk. Mature females have two functional ovaries and two functional uteruses. Fertilized eggs are ovulated into the uterus at a diameter of 3.0–4.5 cm (1.2–1.8 in), though a few may be retained in the ovary; the eggs are not enclosed in a capsule. The external yolk sac is fully resorbed when the embryo is close to term, with the remaining yolk having been transferred to an internal yolk sac attached to the intestine. The internal yolk sac serves to provision the newborn shark until it learns to feed. The litter size ranges from four to 40. Newborns measure 13–19 cm (5.1–7.5 in) long.

Various authors have reported the size at maturity as between 46 and 63 cm (18 and 25 in) for males and 51 and 70 cm (20 and 28 in) for females, reflecting differences between geographical areas. Off northern Canada, females give birth in the portion of the Laurentian Channel less than 400 m (1,300 ft) deep. As the young grow, they migrate into the deeper parts of the Channel, and eventually a long distance northward over the Grand Banks or the Labrador Shelf, to the deep continental slope. This movement pattern has not been observed in black dogfish inhabiting adjacent waters off western Greenland. A number of anomalous hermaphroditic specimens have been documented.

== Human interactions ==
The black dogfish is harmless to humans and of little commercial value. Substantial numbers are caught incidentally by commercial deep-sea trawl, gillnet, and longline fisheries operating throughout the North Atlantic, including the Icelandic Greenland halibut fishery, the French mixed-species trawl fishery, and the Canadian Greenland halibut, crab, redfish, monkfish, and witch fisheries. Captured sharks are usually discarded, though in recent years this and other small deepwater sharks have been increasingly retained and used for fishmeal. Reported catches by European countries, of which France made the largest contribution, have followed a declining trend from 486 tons in 2001 to 35 tons in 2006. The average catch by Canadian fisheries was 68 tons per year from 1996 to 2005. The black dogfish occurs mostly too deep for fisheries off southern Africa; in the remainder of its range, little information is available on fishery impact.

The International Union for Conservation of Nature (IUCN) has listed the black dogfish under Least Concern worldwide; it is minimally affected by fishing activity across many parts of its range, while its population in the northwestern Atlantic presently seems to be stable and may have increased from 1978 to 1995. By contrast, the intensity of deepwater fisheries in the northeastern Atlantic has led the IUCN to give this species a regional assessment of Near Threatened. The reproductive characteristics of the black dogfish, such as a large female maturation size, may render it susceptible to overfishing, though it is more fecund than other deep-sea dogfish sharks. In the northeastern Atlantic, catches of this species are managed as part of the total allowable catch for deep-sea sharks set by the International Council for the Exploration of the Sea (ICES).
