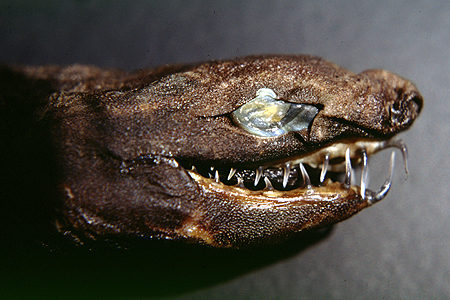

Conservation status
- Least Concern (IUCN 3.1)

Scientific classification
- Kingdom: Animalia
- Phylum: Chordata
- Class: Chondrichthyes
- Subclass: Elasmobranchii
- Division: Selachii
- Order: Squaliformes
- Family: Etmopteridae
- Genus: Trigonognathus; Mochizuki & Ohe, 1990
- Species: T. kabeyai

Binomial name
- Trigonognathus kabeyai Mochizuki & Ohe, 1990
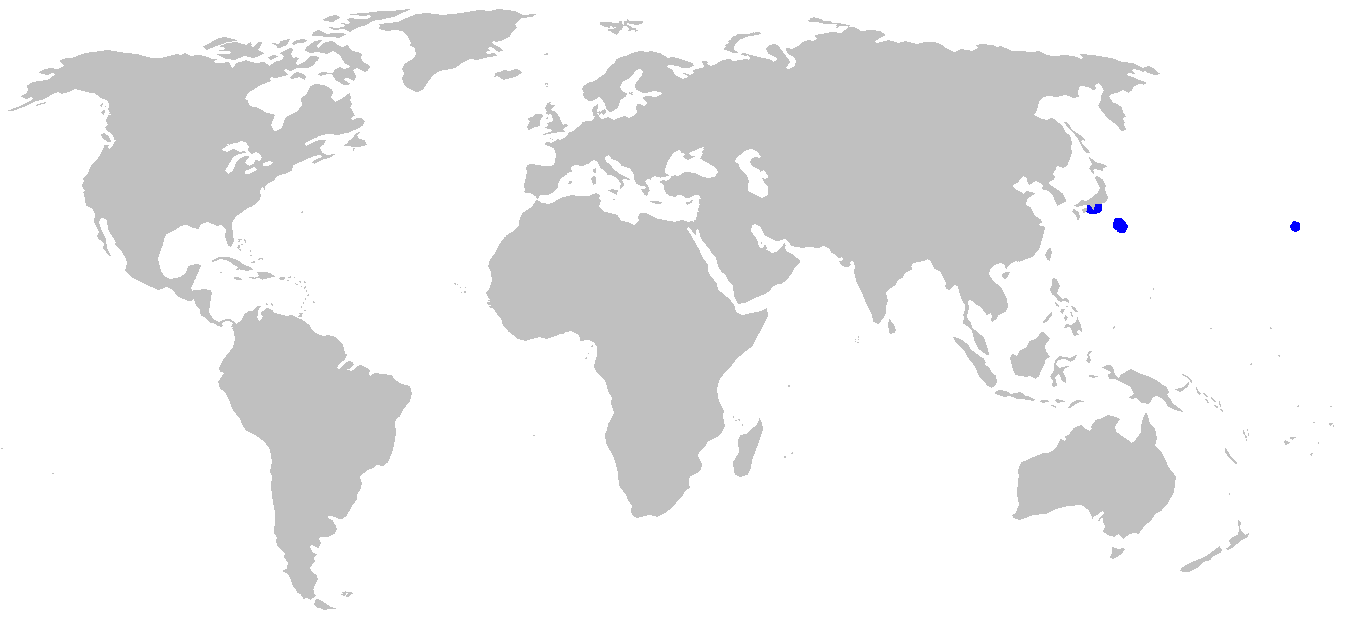
- Range of the viper dogfish

= Viper dogfish =

Species of shark

The viper dogfish or viper shark (Trigonognathus kabeyai) is a rare species of dogfish shark in the family Etmopteridae, and the only extant member of its genus. It has been found in the Pacific Ocean off southern Japan, the Bonin Islands, Pacific Ocean off northern Taitung County and the Northwestern Hawaiian Islands. This species inhabits upper continental slopes and seamounts. It may migrate vertically, shifting between bottom waters 270–360 m (890–1,180 ft) deep during the day and upper waters less than 150 m (490 ft) deep at night. A slender, black shark reaching 54 cm (21 in) in length, the viper dogfish can be recognized by its narrow, triangular jaws and well-spaced, fang-like teeth. It also has two spined dorsal fins, dermal denticles with faceted crowns, and numerous light-emitting photophores concentrated on its ventral surface.

Feeding mainly on bony fishes, the viper dogfish captures prey by protruding its jaws and impaling them with its teeth. Its impressive gape allows it to swallow relatively large fish whole. The skeletal and muscular structure of its head shows unique features that support this feeding mechanism, which is unlike that of other dogfish sharks. This shark gives birth to live young, which are nourished by yolk during gestation; the litter size is probably fewer than 26 pups. Small numbers of viper dogfish are caught incidentally in purse seines and bottom trawls.

== Taxonomy ==
The first specimens of the viper dogfish were two immature males caught off southern Japan by the bottom trawler Seiryo-Maru in 1986. The first, designated as the holotype, measured 22 cm (8.7 in) long and was collected off Cape Shiono at a depth of 330 m (1,080 ft). The second measured 37 cm (15 in) long and was collected off Hiwasa, Tokushima at a depth of 360 m (1,180 ft). The shark was described as a new species and genus by University of Tokyo researchers Kenji Mochizuki and Fumio Ohe in a 1990 article for the Japanese Journal of Ichthyology. They gave it the name Trigonognathus kabeyai; the specific name honors Hiromichi Kabeya, the captain of the Seiryo-Maru.

Mochizuki and Ohe originally assigned the viper dogfish to the family Squalidae, which at the time was used for all members of the order Squaliformes aside from the bramble and rough sharks. In a 1992 morphological study, Shigeru Shirai and Osamu Okamura placed this species in the squalid subfamily Etmopterinae, which most taxonomists now recognize as the separate family Etmopteridae.

== Phylogeny and evolution ==
The position of Trigonognathus within the Etmopteridae is uncertain. Morphological and molecular phylogenetic data generally support the subdivision of the Etmopteridae into two clades, one consisting of Etmopterus and Miroscyllium and the other consisting of Centroscyllium and Aculeola. Phylogenetic analyses have variously placed Trigonognathus as closer to one clade or the other or as basal to both, depending on which morphological characters, nuclear DNA markers, and/or mitochondrial DNA markers were used.

Based on molecular clock estimation, Trigonognathus is thought to have originated around 41 million years ago during the Middle Eocene, as part of a larger evolutionary radiation of etmopterid genera. The genus is represented in this time period by the extinct species T. virginiae, whose fossilized teeth have been recovered from Lutetian age (47.8–41.3 Mya) strata in Landes, southwestern France. Fossil teeth virtually identical to those of the modern viper dogfish are known from the Cubagua Formation in northeastern Venezuela, which dates to the Late Miocene and Early Pliocene (11.6–3.6 Mya).

== Description ==
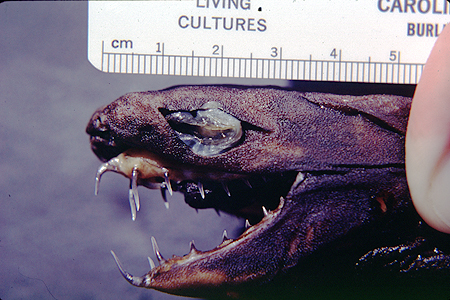
The narrow jaws and needle-like teeth of the viper dogfish are distinctive.

The viper dogfish has a slender, cylindrical body and a moderately flattened head with a very short and blunt snout. Behind the large oval eyes are narrow, elliptical spiracles. The nostrils are nearly vertical slits. The jaws are long and narrowly triangular, and can be protruded from the head. The teeth are distinctively fang-like and widely spaced; the most anterior teeth are grooved lengthwise. Six to 10 upper and seven to 10 lower tooth rows occur on each side, along with a single tooth row at the upper and lower symphyses (jaw midpoints). The teeth are largest at the symphysis and decline in size towards the corners of the mouth. When the mouth is closed, the upper symphysial tooth overlaps the lower, while the lateral teeth interlock. Five gill slits are seen, with the fifth pair longer than the others.

The fins are small and very thin. The pectoral fins are rounded and lobe-like. The two dorsal fins are positioned about between the pectoral and pelvic fins. Each dorsal fin bears a slightly grooved spine in front; the second dorsal spine is longer than the first. The anal fin is absent, and the caudal peduncle lacks keels or notches. The upper lobe of the caudal fin is larger than the lower and has a notch in the trailing margin. The skin, excluding on the fins, is densely covered with irregularly arranged, nonoverlapping dermal denticles. Each denticle has a swollen rhombic shape with 10–40 facets on the crown. The viper dogfish is black with distinct darker markings on the underside. These markings contain large numbers of tiny light-producing photophores; more photophores are found sparsely scattered over the rest of the body, as well as in a translucent patch on the upper eyelid. The fins are translucent, and the tip of the caudal fin upper lobe is blackish. The largest known male is 47 cm (19 in) long and weighs 0.43 kg (0.95 lb), and the largest female is 54 cm (21 in) long and weighs 0.76 kg (1.7 lb).

== Distribution and habitat ==
Most specimens of the viper dogfish have been collected from a relatively small area of the northwestern Pacific Ocean off the Kii Peninsula in Japan. A number of specimens were also recovered from the stomachs of predatory fishes caught in the Bonin Islands. One specimen was caught from the Hancock Seamount, located some 300 km (190 mi) northwest of Kure Atoll in the northwestern Hawaiian Islands. During the day, this species has been caught close to the bottom on the upper reaches of continental slopes and seamounts, at depths of 270–360 m (890–1,180 ft). At night, it has been caught between the surface and a depth of 150 m (490 ft) in water over 1.5 km (0.93 mi) deep. This pattern suggests the viper dogfish performs a diel vertical migration, spending the day in deeper water and rising towards the surface at night; such daily movement may relate to feeding.

== Biology and ecology ==
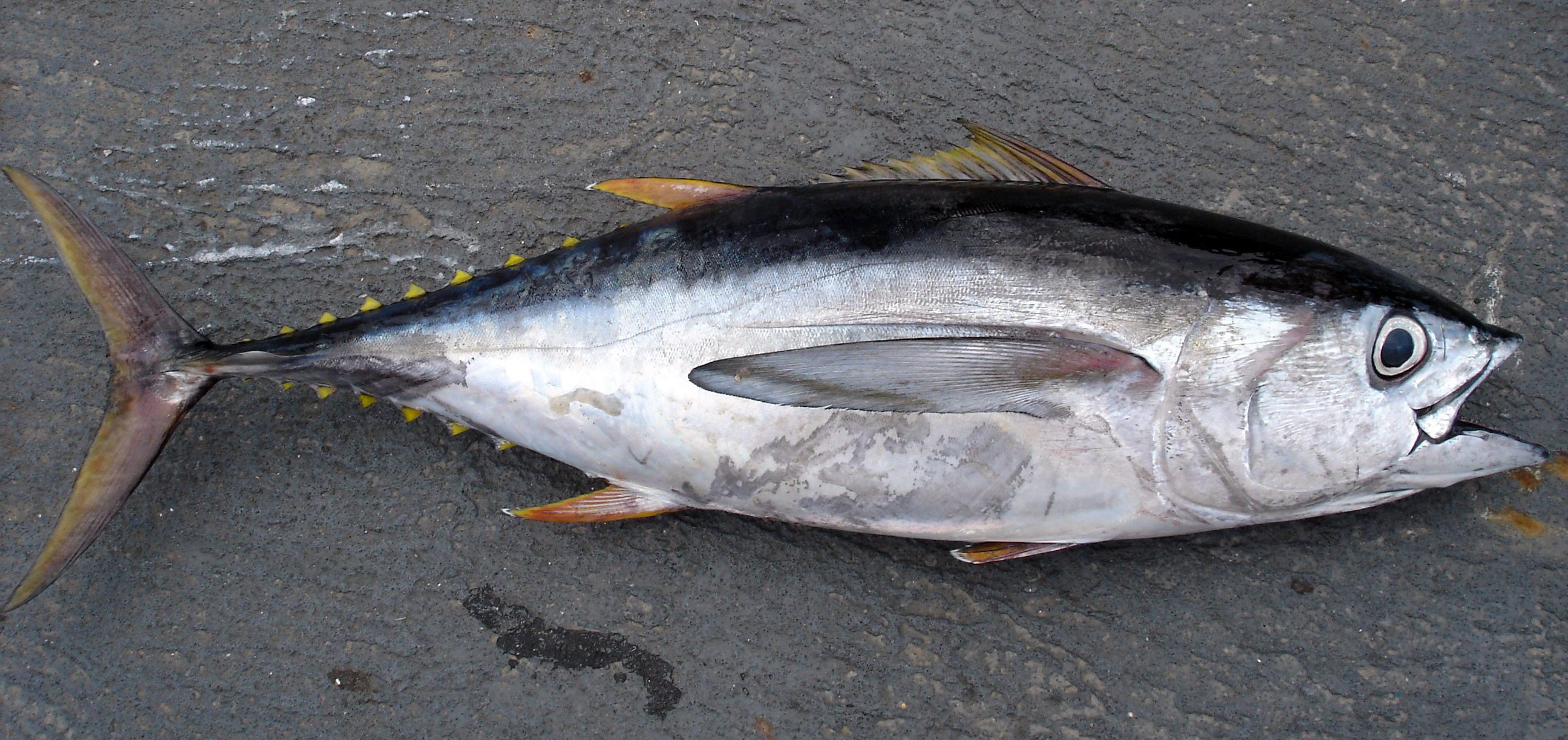
The bigeye tuna preys on the viper dogfish.

The viper dogfish feeds primarily on bony fishes, notably lanternfishes in the genera Benthosema and Diaphus, and also takes crustaceans. Its long jaws and slender teeth are adapted for grasping rather than cutting, in contrast to the short jaws and saw-like lower teeth of other dogfish sharks that are suited for excising chunks of meat. Prey is seized by a rapid extension of the jaws and swallowed whole; the shark can consume fish close to 40% as long as itself. The viper dogfish is the only dogfish species that lacks a suborbital muscle, which is normally responsible for pulling the jaws forward when biting. Jaw protrusion is instead effected by the hyomandibular bone, which is articulated to the skull in a manner that allows it to swing down and forward. This unique arrangement serves to increase the distance the shark can protrude its jaws, as well as the size of its gape both vertically and horizontally.

Known predators of the viper dogfish include the bigeye tuna (Thunnus obesus) and the sickle pomfret (Taractichthys steindachneri). Like other members of its family, this species is viviparous, giving birth to live offspring, with the developing embryos sustained to term by yolk. Adult females have two functional ovaries and two functional uteri. Two of the recorded female specimens contained 25 and 26 mature ova; in the related black dogfish (Centroscyllium fabricii), the number of mature ova in a female is slightly greater than the number of resulting embryos, which suggests a litter size under 26 in the viper dogfish. Males and females mature sexually at roughly 43 and 52 cm (17 and 20 in) long, respectively.

== Human interactions ==
The viper dogfish has no economic value. It is very infrequently caught in commercial purse seines and bottom trawls targeting other species, though what effect, if any, fishing has on its population is unknown. The IUCN has listed it as Least Concern.
