= Highfin dogfish =

Conservation status
- Near Threatened (IUCN 3.1)

Scientific classification
- Kingdom: Animalia
- Phylum: Chordata
- Class: Chondrichthyes
- Subclass: Elasmobranchii
- Division: Selachii
- Order: Squaliformes
- Family: Etmopteridae
- Genus: Centroscyllium
- Species: C. excelsum

Binomial name
- Centroscyllium excelsum Shirai & Nakaya, 1990
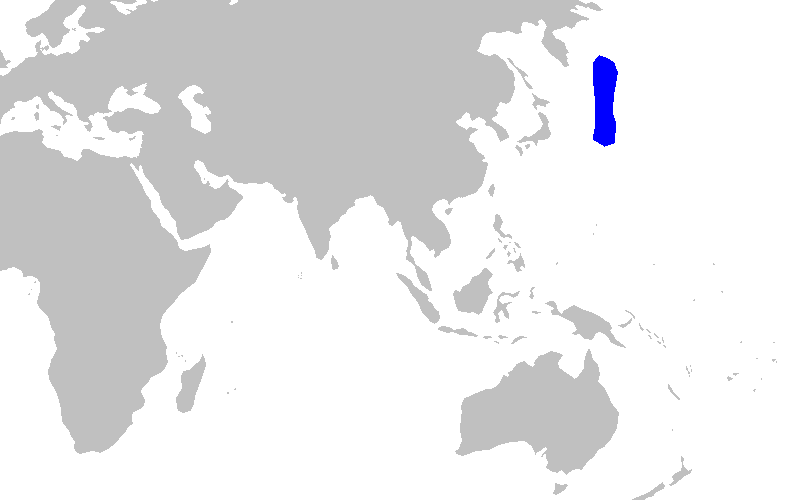
- Range of highfin dogfish (in blue)

Species of shark

The highfin dogfish (Centroscyllium excelsum) is a lanternshark of the family Etmopteridae, found in the northwest Pacific Ocean on the Emperor Seamount chain between latitudes 50 and 38°N, at depths between 800 and 1,000 m. It reaches a length of 63 cm.

The highfin dogfish is ovoviviparous.
