= CIEM =

CIEM may refer to:

- Calcutta Institute of Engineering and Management, a government college in West Bengal, India
- Conseil International de l'Exploration de la Mer, a regional fishery advisory body
