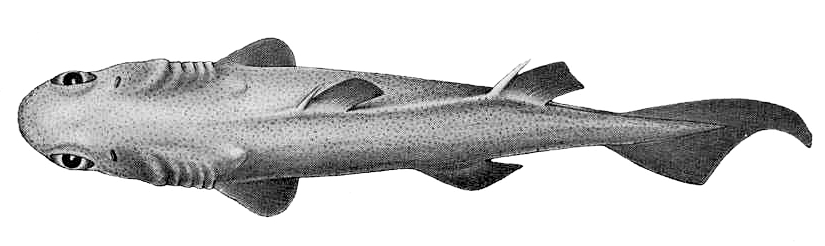

Conservation status
- Least Concern (IUCN 3.1)

Scientific classification
- Domain: Eukaryota
- Kingdom: Animalia
- Phylum: Chordata
- Class: Chondrichthyes
- Subclass: Elasmobranchii
- Division: Selachii
- Order: Squaliformes
- Family: Etmopteridae
- Genus: Centroscyllium
- Species: C. ornatum

Binomial name
- Centroscyllium ornatum (Alcock, 1889)
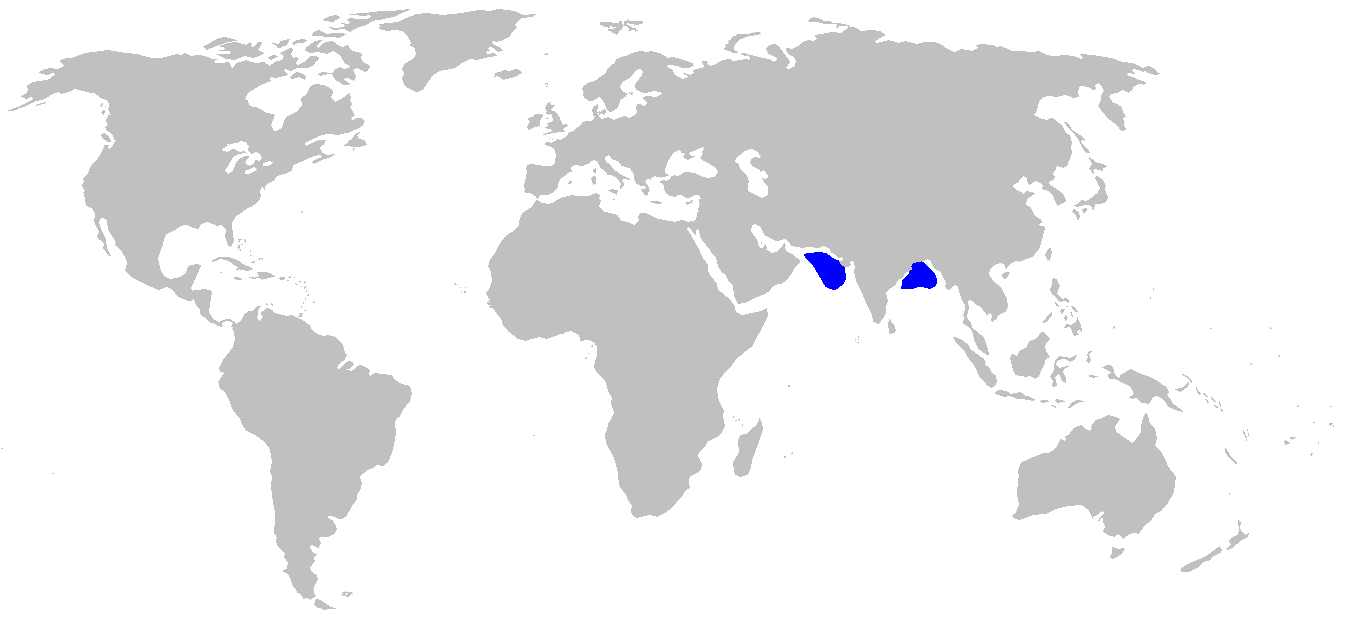
- Range of ornate dogfish (in blue)

= Ornate dogfish =

Species of shark

The ornate dogfish (Centroscyllium ornatum) is dogfish shark which is not widely known. It is found in deepwater on the continental slopes of the Indian Ocean, the Arabian Sea and the Bay of Bengal, at depths between 520 and 1,260 m. Its length is up to 30 cm, and its reproduction is ovoviviparous.

== Field marks ==
No anal fin, grooved dorsal fin spines, teeth with narrow cusps and cusplets in upper and lower jaws, uniform dark coloration. Short abdomen and short caudal peduncle, close-set denticles on body.

== Diagnostic features ==
Body moderately stout and compressed, preoral snout moderately long, about half of distance from mouth to pectoral origins; mouth narrowly arched, nearly half as high as wide. Second dorsal fin somewhat larger than first; pectoral apices when laid back ending about opposite to first dorsal spine origin. Caudal peduncle moderately long, distance from second dorsal insertion to upper caudal origin about as long as distance from eye to third gill slits. Lateral trunk denticles close-set, conical and with hooked cusps. Colour blackish, without white fin tips or prominent black markings on underside of body and sides of tail. Size moderate, adults about 50 cm.
