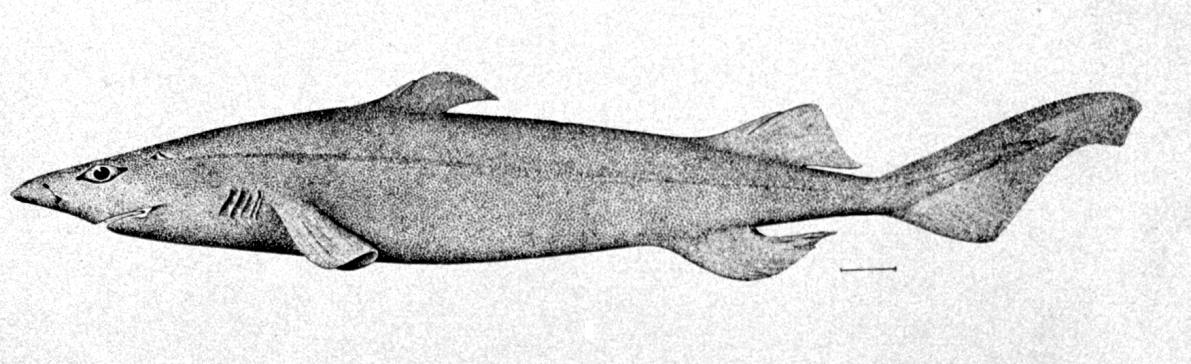
- Black dogfish, C. fabricii

Scientific classification
- Domain: Eukaryota
- Kingdom: Animalia
- Phylum: Chordata
- Class: Chondrichthyes
- Subclass: Elasmobranchii
- Division: Selachii
- Order: Squaliformes
- Family: Etmopteridae
- Genus: Centroscyllium; J. P. Müller & Henle, 1841

Species
- See text

= Centroscyllium =

Genus of sharks

Centroscyllium is a genus of big-eyed, deepwater dogfishes with no anal fin, a grey or black-brown body, and dorsal spines, with the second one being much larger than the first. Seven extant species are described.

== Species ==
- Centroscyllium excelsum Shirai & Nakaya, 1990 (highfin dogfish)
- Centroscyllium fabricii J. C. H. Reinhardt, 1825 (black dogfish)
- Centroscyllium granulatum Günther, 1887 (granular dogfish)
- Centroscyllium kamoharai T. Abe, 1966 (bareskin dogfish)
- Centroscyllium nigrum Garman, 1899 (combtooth dogfish)
- Centroscyllium ornatum Alcock, 1889 (ornate dogfish)
- Centroscyllium ritteri Jordan & Fowler, 1903 (whitefin dogfish)
