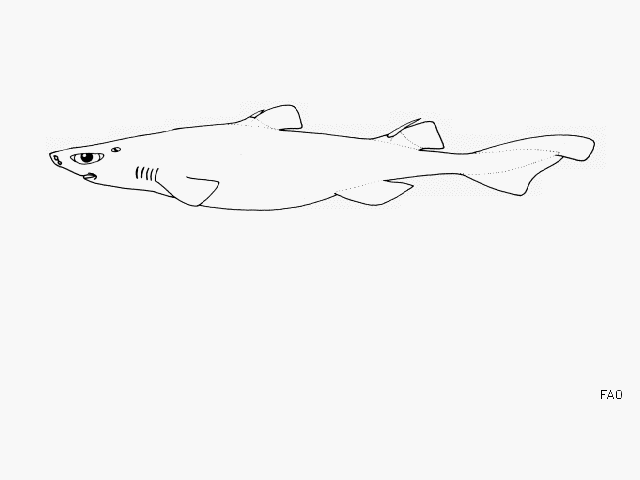

Conservation status
- Least Concern (IUCN 3.1)

Scientific classification
- Kingdom: Animalia
- Phylum: Chordata
- Class: Chondrichthyes
- Subclass: Elasmobranchii
- Division: Selachii
- Order: Squaliformes
- Family: Etmopteridae
- Genus: Centroscyllium
- Species: C. kamoharai

Binomial name
- Centroscyllium kamoharai T. Abe, 1966
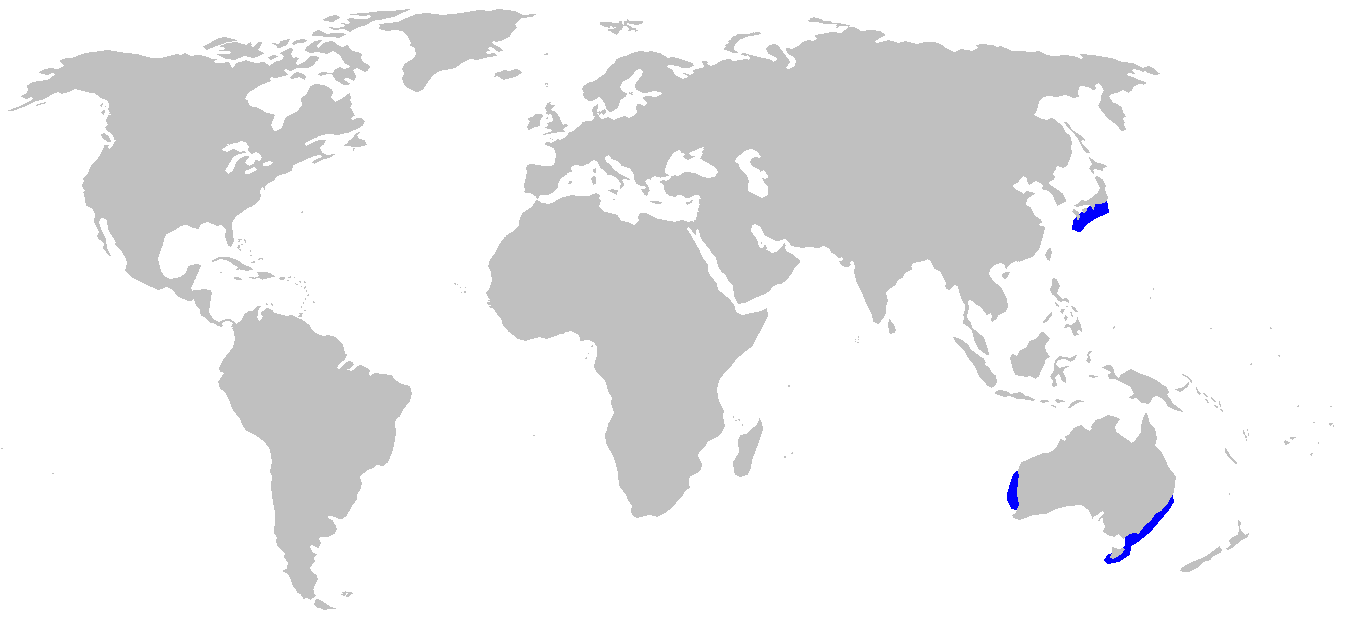
- Range bareskin dogfish (in blue)

= Bareskin dogfish =

Species of shark

The bareskin dogfish (Centroscyllium kamoharai) is a little-known, deepwater dogfish shark of the family Etmopteridae. This species is found in the western Pacific from southern Japan to western and southeastern Australia as well as in New Zealand waters.

The bareskin dogfish has no anal fin. It has grooved dorsal spines with the second larger than the first, a smaller first dorsal fin, blunt nose, large eyes, large nostrils, widely spaced and sparse denticles, and is dark in color with white-tipped fins. It is stout and grows to a maximum of 40 cm. Like other species in the family Etmopteridae (lanternsharks), the bareskin dogfish has a bioluminescent organ on the ventral side; however, perhaps owing to the depth at which the species lives, it has relatively fewer photophores on its ventral skin than other bioluminescent sharks.

== Conservation status ==
The New Zealand Department of Conservation has classified the bareskin dogfish as "Data Deficient" under the New Zealand Threat Classification System.
