= J. G. Mayne =

J. G. Mayne CBE KPM

Chief Constable of East Suffolk Constabulary
- In office 1899 – May 1933

Personal details
- Born: Jasper Graham Mayne; 9 April 1859
- Died: 6 January 1936 (aged 76)
- Occupation: British Army officer

Jasper Graham Mayne CBE KPM (9 April 1859 – 6 January 1936) was a British soldier, marksman and police officer.

Mayne was the son of a lieutenant-colonel in the Indian Army. He was educated at Cheltenham College and the Royal Military College, Sandhurst. In 1879 he was commissioned into the 27th Regiment of Foot (later the Royal Inniskilling Fusiliers). He was promoted lieutenant in 1881. In 1886, he was appointed ADC to the governor of the Straits Settlements, Sir Frederick Aloysius Weld, and married his daughter later the same year. In July 1887 he rejoined his regiment, being promoted captain in September. From 1888 to 1889 he was acting military secretary and ADC to Sir Hercules Robinson, Governor and High Commissioner of South Africa.

In August 1891 he became an instructor at the School of Musketry in Hythe and in January 1896 was appointed inspector of musketry of the Home District. He retired from the army in January 1899.

Mayne was secretary of the Army Rifle Association from 1894 to 1924. He won many shooting trophies and titles.

In 1899 he was appointed Chief Constable of the East Suffolk County Constabulary and held the post until his retirement in May 1933.

Mayne was awarded the King's Police Medal in the 1916 New Year Honours, appointed Officer of the Order of the British Empire (OBE) in the 1920 civilian war honours and Commander of the Order of the British Empire (CBE) in the 1924 Birthday Honours.
