= Jakob Jakobsson (biologist) =

Icelandic fisheries biologist and former ICES President

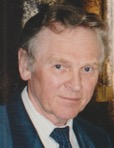
- Born: 28 June 1931; Neskaupstaður, Iceland
- Died: 22 October 2020 (aged 89); Reykjavík, Iceland
- Occupations: Fisheries biologist, marine scientist
- Known for: Research on herring biology; President of ICES (1988–1991)

Jakob Jakobsson (28 June 1931 – 22 October 2020) was an Icelandic fisheries biologist, research administrator, and marine scientist. He served as Director of the Marine Research Institute (now the Marine and Freshwater Research Institute) from 1984 to 1998 and was President of the International Council for the Exploration of the Sea (ICES) from 1988 to 1991. He is widely regarded as one of the most influential Icelandic fisheries scientists of the twentieth century.

== Early life and education ==
Jakobsson was born in Neskaupstaður in eastern Iceland. His father was a fishing-boat skipper, and as a boy Jakobsson helped measure sea temperature at high tide for local fisheries planning.

He graduated from Reykjavík Grammar School in 1952 and earned a BSc (Hons.) degree in fisheries biology and mathematics from the University of Glasgow in 1956.

== Career ==
Jakobsson joined the Marine Research Institute (MRI) in the 1950s. He became deputy director in 1975 and served as Director from 1984 to 1998.

As Director, he modernised the Institute and strengthened scientific advice for Icelandic fisheries. He played a key role during the development and implementation of Iceland's individual transferable quota (ITQ) system.

Jakobsson was known for his research on Icelandic summer-spawning herring and Norwegian spring-spawning herring. His work contributed to understanding stock collapses in the 1960s–70s, environmental drivers of recruitment, and recovery dynamics.

He worked extensively on capelin stock assessments and contributed to knowledge of North Atlantic pelagic ecosystems, including interactions among capelin, cod, herring, and marine mammals.

Jakobsson served on several ICES working groups, including:

- Herring Assessment Working Group for the Area South of 62° N
- Atlanto-Scandian Herring and Capelin Working Group
- Blue Whiting Assessment Working Group
- Working Group on North Atlantic Salmon

His work helped refine stock-assessment methodologies and improve communication of scientific uncertainty.

== Leadership in ICES ==
Jakobsson became Iceland's Delegate to ICES in 1983. He was elected vice-president and Bureau member in 1984, and First Vice-president in 1985.

During his presidency, Jakobsson oversaw organisational reforms, including:

- shifting to thematic scientific committees
- strengthening Theme Sessions at the ICES Annual Science Conference
- introducing awards for best presentations
- upgrading Secretariat computing systems
- improving the accessibility and visibility of ICES publications

He was widely respected for his fair, warm, and humorous leadership style.

== Honours and awards ==
- Order of the Falcon (Stórriddarakross), Iceland
- Chorafas Prize (1995), for work on sustainable use of natural resources

== Personal life ==
He married Jóhanna Gunnbjörnsdóttir, who died in 1974, and later married Margrét E. Jónsdóttir, a reporter at Reykjavík Radio. He had three children and several grandchildren.

== Death and legacy ==
Jakobsson died in Reykjavík on 22 October 2020, aged 89.

Jakobsson is regarded as a central figure in Icelandic fisheries science. His legacy includes:

- building trust between scientists and the fishing industry
- strengthening the scientific foundations of Iceland's quota-based management system
- mentoring generations of Icelandic fisheries scientists
- modernising both MRI and ICES during key transitional periods

Colleagues remembered him for his wit, charm, and ability to keep complex discussions productive.
