= Viney Mountain =

Mountain in West Virginia, United States

Highest point
- Elevation: 1,161 m (3,809 ft)
- Coordinates: 38.1631739°N 80.2653510°W

Geography
- Location: West Virginia, United States

Viney Mountain is a summit in West Virginia, in the United States. With an elevation of 3,809 feet (1,161 m), Viney Mountain is the 138th highest summit in the state of West Virginia.

According to tradition, Viney Mountain derives its name from Vina, a slave who received manumission and the mountain upon her master's death.
