= Henry Gascoyne Maurice =

Henry Gascoyne Maurice CB (24 May 1874, Marlborough – 12 May 1950) was President of the International Council for the Exploration of the Sea 1920–1938 and President of the Zoological Society of London 1942–1948. He also headed the Fisheries Department of the Ministry of Agriculture from 1912 and was Fisheries Secretary at the Ministry of Agriculture and Fisheries from 1920 until his retirement in 1938, after which he served on the White Fish Commission from its inception in 1938 until its suspension on the outbreak of war in September 1939.
