= Robert Joseph Willan =

British surgeon

Robert Joseph Willan CBE MVO VD FRCS (10 January 1878 - 12 January 1955) was a British surgeon and academic.

== Early life ==
Robert Joseph Willan was born on 10 January 1878, the second son of John Willan JP of Durham, and was educated there at Durham School followed by Durham University where he qualified as a doctor in 1906. He was born into a family of farmers in Shincliffe, on the south-east edge of Durham.

== Career ==
In the First World War he served as Staff Surgeon, and was awarded the MVO in 1915. Willan retired from the RNVR in 1933 with the rank of Surgeon-Captain, and King's Honorary Surgeon.

In 1935, he succeeded Professor Grey Turner as chair of surgery at Royal Victoria Infirmary in Newcastle upon Tyne, and remained in post until his retirement in 1942.

In the Second World War, he was re-employed as Surgeon-Captain RNVR and rose to Surgeon Rear-Admiral, Royal Navy.

== Personal life ==
In 1910, he married Dorothy Eleanor Shawyer (died 8 September 1949), and they had a son (died age 20) and two daughters.

Willan died on 12 January 1955.
