= E. C. S. Shuttleworth =

British civil servant

Edward Cheke Smalley Shuttleworth CIE KPM (1866 – 11 December 1943) was a British civil servant who was first sent to India and afterwards (from about 1916) to Burma as head of security in Yangon (Rangoon). In 1918 the editors of the periodical Thuriya objected to the rule whereby the British were required to enter Buddhist temples barefoot. Shuttleworth published an account of the life of prostitutes in the cities of India and Burma in 1917 and in 1923 another about Burmese shorthand.

== Works ==
- E. C. S. Shuttleworth, Extent, distribution and regulation of the "social evil" in the cities of Calcutta, Madras and Bombay and in Rangoon town. Rangoon, 1917 [BL Oriental and India Office Collections L/P&J/6/1448 (2987)]
- E. C. S. Shuttleworth, A Manual on Burmese Shorthand. Rangoon: Superintendent of Government Printing, 1923

== Sources ==
- Philippa Levine, "Orientalist Sociology and the Creation of Colonial Sexualities" in Feminist Review vol. 65 no. 1 (2000) pp. 5–21
- Philippa Levine, Prostitution, Race, and Politics: Policing Venereal Disease in the British Empire. London: Routledge, 2003. ISBN 0-415-94447-3
