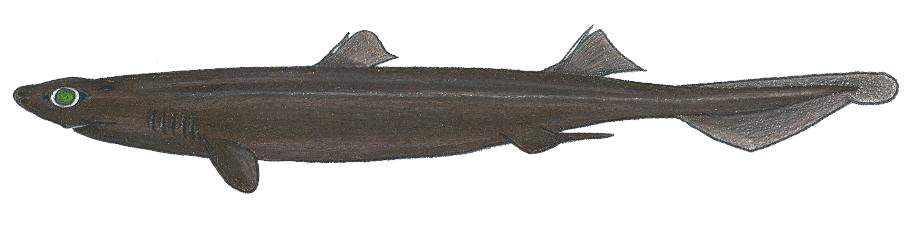

Conservation status
- Vulnerable (IUCN 3.1)

Scientific classification
- Kingdom: Animalia
- Phylum: Chordata
- Class: Chondrichthyes
- Subclass: Elasmobranchii
- Division: Selachii
- Order: Squaliformes
- Family: Etmopteridae
- Genus: Centroscyllium
- Species: C. granulatum

Binomial name
- Centroscyllium granulatum Günther, 1887
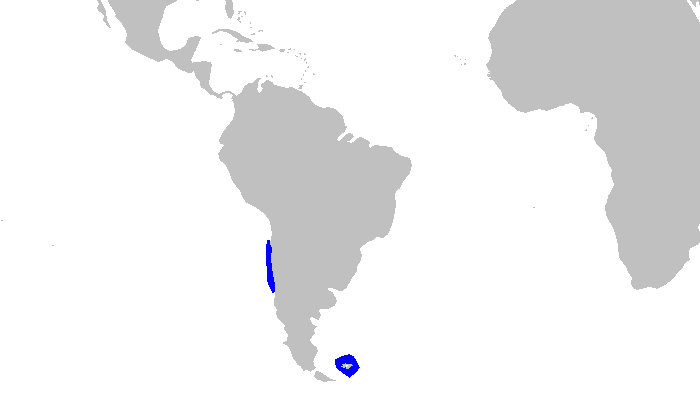
- Range of the granular dogfish (in blue)

= Granular dogfish =

Species of shark

The granular dogfish (Centroscyllium granulatum) is a little-known, very small dogfish shark of the family Etmopteridae, endemic to the Falkland Islands.

== Physical characteristics ==
The granular dogfish has no anal fin, two dorsal spines with the second one much larger than the first, a large second dorsal fin, a long abdomen, small pectoral and pelvic fins, a large eye, prominent nostrils and spiracles, and brownish-black coloration. It is very small, growing to only 28 cm (11 in).

== Distribution ==
It has only been found around the Falkland Islands in the South Atlantic.

== Habits and habitat ==
Almost nothing is known about this shark. It has been caught at around 450 m (1,480 ft) depth.
