= Shigeru Shirai =

Japanese ichthyologist

Shigeru Shirai (白井 滋, Shirai Shigeru) is a Japanese ichthyologist specializing in elasmobranchs, especially sharks. He graduated from Hokkaido University's Laboratory of Marine Zoology with a PhD in Fisheries Science. He is an editor of Japan's Ichthyological Research journal and author of the book, Squalean Phylogeny. He died at the age of 63 on September 9, 2020.

== Taxon described by him ==
- See Category:Taxa named by Shigeru Shirai
