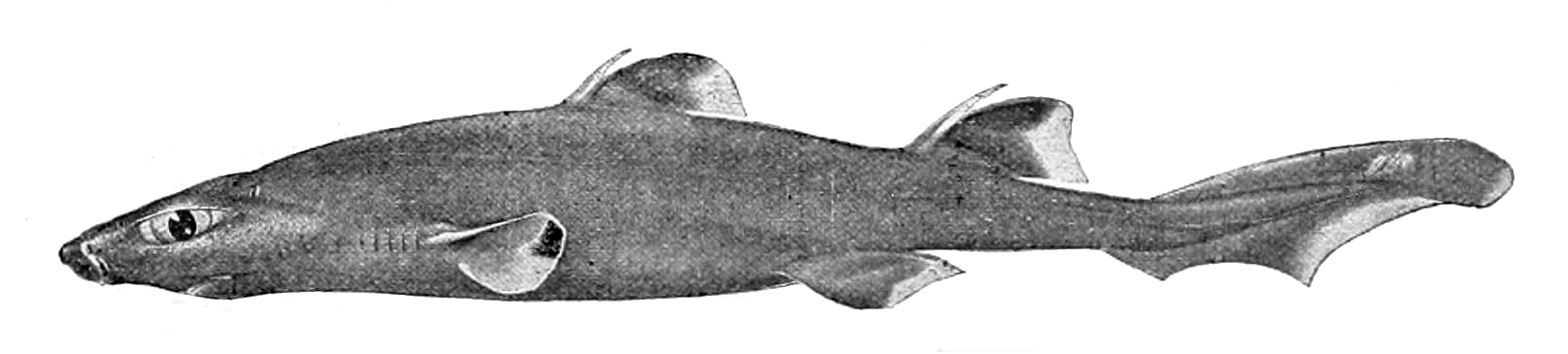

Conservation status
- Least Concern (IUCN 3.1)

Scientific classification
- Kingdom: Animalia
- Phylum: Chordata
- Class: Chondrichthyes
- Subclass: Elasmobranchii
- Division: Selachii
- Order: Squaliformes
- Family: Etmopteridae
- Genus: Centroscyllium
- Species: C. nigrum

Binomial name
- Centroscyllium nigrum Garman, 1899
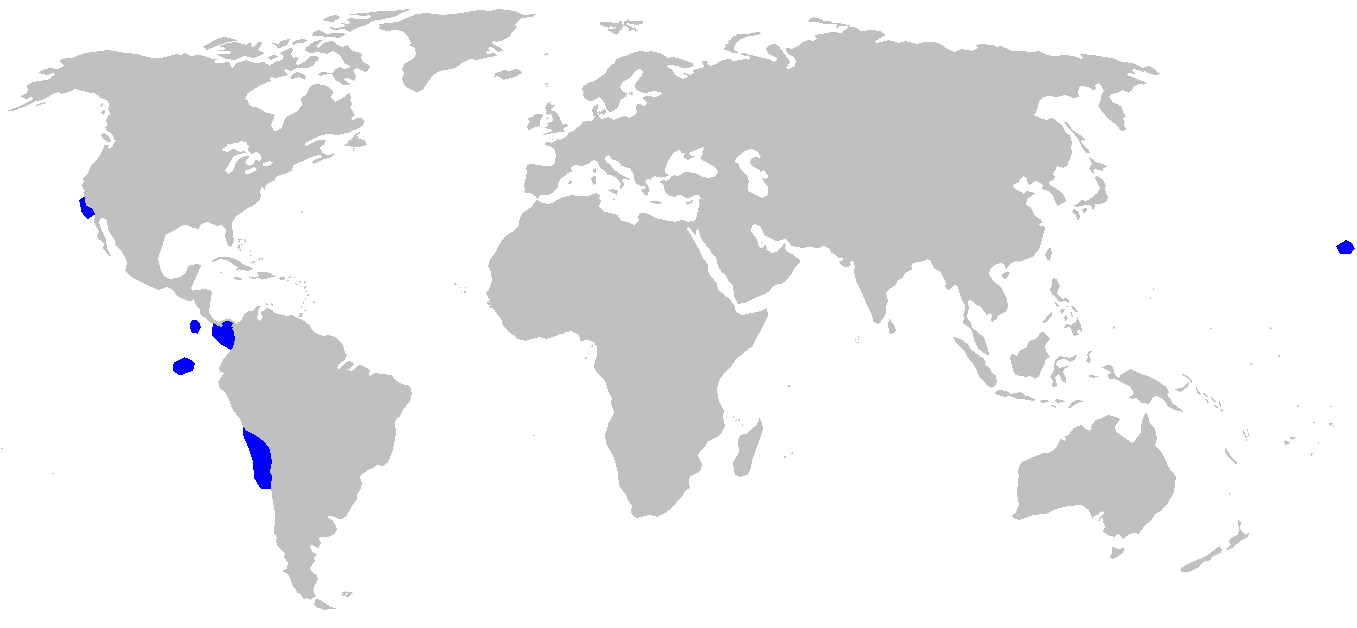
- Range of combtooth dogfish (in blue)

= Combtooth dogfish =

Species of shark

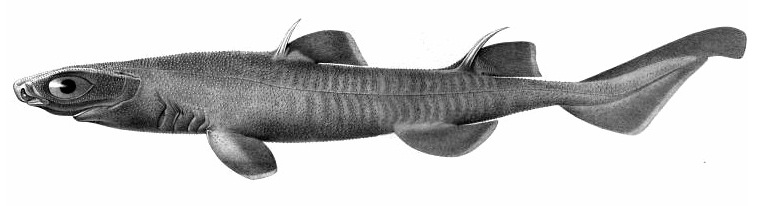

The combtooth dogfish (Centroscyllium nigrum) is a little-known, deepwater dogfish shark, named after its teeth that are comb-shaped.

== Description ==
The combtooth dogfish has no anal fin, grooved dorsal spines, two dorsal fins of about same size, a pointed nose, large eyes, small gill slits, a short abdomen, a short caudal peduncle, and is blackish-brown in color with white-tipped fins. Like all dogfish sharks, it has 2 spines in front of its 2 dorsal fins. It grows to a maximum of 50 cm. It has a faint tiger-like band held together by the lateral line that has photophores that emit light to attract prey. Immature pups are born at 11-13 cm. It has a spiracle behind each eye.

== Diet ==
Its diet consists of eating small fish, shrimp, and cephalopods.

== Habits and Habitat ==
It is an uncommon deepwater shark found close to the bottom between 400 and 1,145 m. It is found in the eastern Pacific and around Hawaii.
