= William M. Viney =

African American activist (c. 1840–?)

- Born: Ohio, U.S.
- Other name: W. M. Viney
- Occupations: political organizer, a civil rights activist, farmer, minister

William M. Viney was an African-American political organizer, a civil rights activist, farmer, and minister. Viney served as a constitutional convention delegate in South Carolina during the Reconstruction era, as a political organizer, and as a sergeant in the American Civil War.

== Biography ==
William M. Viney was born in Ohio, and early in life he worked as a broom maker. He served as a sergeant in Company G of the 54th Massachusetts Infantry Regiment during the American Civil War.

After the war he settled in the Colleton County of South Carolina and bought land near Somerville, and in July 1865 he tried to integrate Charleston, South Carolina's streetcars by riding on one for "whites only". He travelled throughout the Colleton County District holding meetings and reached out to poor whites in his political organizing, which led up to the South Carolina's 1868 Constitutional Convention. He was frequently threatened violence during his political organizing.

He was a delegate to South Carolina's 1868 Constitutional Convention.
