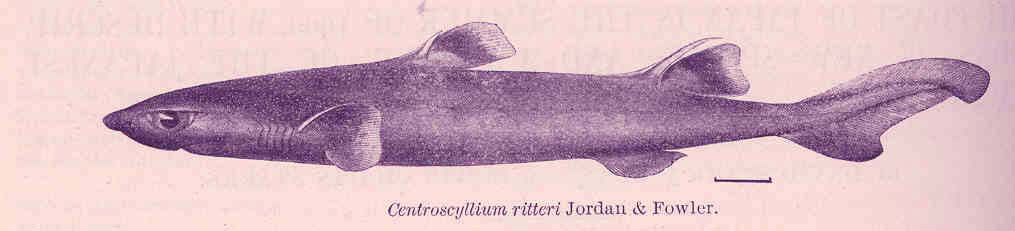

Conservation status
- Least Concern (IUCN 3.1)

Scientific classification
- Kingdom: Animalia
- Phylum: Chordata
- Class: Chondrichthyes
- Subclass: Elasmobranchii
- Division: Selachii
- Order: Squaliformes
- Family: Etmopteridae
- Genus: Centroscyllium
- Species: C. ritteri

Binomial name
- Centroscyllium ritteri D. S. Jordan & Fowler, 1903
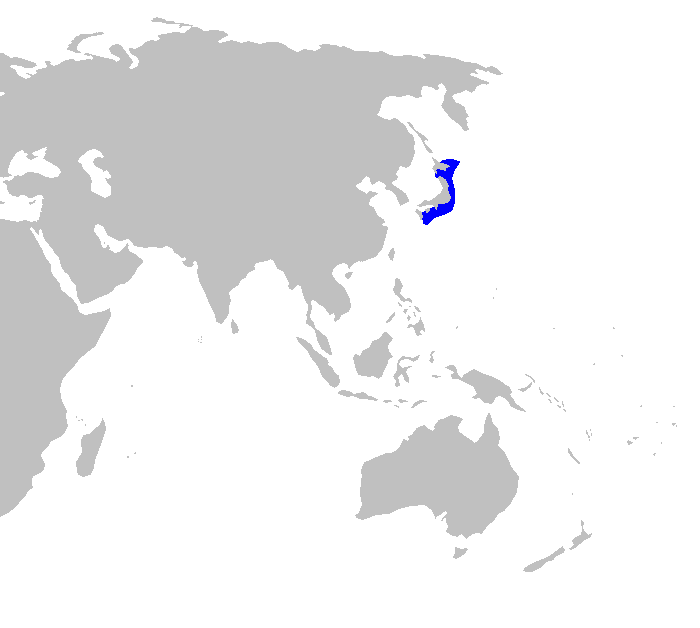
- Range of the whitefin dogfish

= Whitefin dogfish =

Species of shark

The whitefin dogfish (Centroscyllium ritteri) is a species of deep-sea dogfish shark in the family Etmopteridae. It has only been found in the northwest Pacific Ocean off the southeastern coast of Japan, between the latitudes of 35 and 32°N. It inhabits continental slopes and seamounts at a depth of 320 to 1,100 m (1,050 to 3,610 ft). Reproduction is ovoviviparous. It is of no interest to fisheries and almost nothing is known of its biology. The specific epithet ritteri is in honor of Dr. William Emerson Ritter of the University of California.

The largest known example of this shark measured 43 cm (17 in) long. It has an elongated body with a broad, flattened head and a moderately long snout. The eyes and spiracles are large. The mouth is broadly arched, containing many teeth with narrow cusps and lateral cusplets. There are two roughly equal-sized dorsal fins with grooved spines; the second spine is longer than the first and slightly curved. The pectoral fins are short and broad, not reaching the first dorsal fin base when folded back. The pelvic fins are small and placed forward of the second dorsal fin. There is no anal fin; the caudal peduncle is long, leading to an asymmetrical caudal fin.

This shark is distinctive in being the only Centroscyllium species with abrupt black markings beneath its head, trunk, and pectoral fins, with a black stripe running from under the caudal peduncle to over the pelvic fins. These markings are in fact concentrations of tiny light-emitting photophores. Unusually, this shark also has photophores along the undersides of its upper eyelids. What function these structures could serve is unclear; Tchernavin speculated that they could be used to illuminate prey or stimulate the eye. The rest of the body is gray-brown, with white fin margins. There are numerous small cone-shaped, hooked prickles over the body, except for under the snout.
