= Ichthyological Research =

Peer-reviewed scientific journal

- Discipline: Ichthyology
- Language: English
- Edited by: Tomoyuki Kokita

Publication details
- History: 1988-present
- Publisher: Springer Science+Business Media
- Frequency: quarterly
- Open access: Hybrid
- Impact factor: 1.223 (2021)

Standard abbreviations
- ISO 4: Ichthyol. Res.

Indexing
- CODEN: GYOZA7
- ISSN: 1341-8998 (print); 1616-3915 (web)
- LCCN: 2008233048
- OCLC no.: 47228094

Links
- Journal homepage

Ichthyological Research is a quarterly peer-reviewed scientific journal covering ichthyology. It is published by Springer Science+Business Media and was established in 1988. The editor-in-chief is Tomoyuki Kokita.

The journal publishes research articles, reviews, and commentaries on Ichthyology, including topics such as taxonomy, systematics, and evolution.

== Abstracting and indexing ==
The journal is abstracted and indexed in:

- Biological Abstracts
- BIOSIS Previews
- CAB Abstracts
- Current Contents/Agriculture, Biology & Environmental Sciences
- EBSCO databases
- ProQuest databases
- Science Citation Index Expanded
- Scopus

According to the Journal Citation Reports, the journal has a 2021 impact factor of 1.223.
