= Moses Viney =

Moses Viney was born into slavery in Maryland in 1817. During his lifetime, he escaped slavery and settled in Schenectady, New York. Viney is best known for his association with Eliphalet Nott for whom Viney was a coachman, messenger and constant companion.

== Early life ==
Born into slavery on March 10, 1817, Moses Viney lived in Talbot, Maryland where he worked on Murphy's Fields up until the age of 17. Around this time, Viney was moved to work in the main house where he was forced to harvest corn, tobacco, and wheat. Viney and two associates ran away from the plantation on Easter Sunday 1840, heading north through the Underground Railroad when he was 23 years old. The friends' biggest fear was being sold back into slavery further south where punishments were generally harsher.

== After slavery ==
The Murphy plantation had dogs to help them track runaway slaves, but Moses himself had trained the dogs, thereby eluding his pursuers and former masters. Running out of funds in Schenectady, New York, Viney had no option but to settle there.

Around 1842, Eliphalet Nott, the president of Union College at that time, hired Moses Viney. When Richard Murphy, Viney's former master, attempted to take Viney back, Eliphalet helped Viney escape to Canada where he lived for two years. Eliphalet Nott paid $250 to Richard Murphy to free Moses Viney from slavery. Upon his death, Eliphalet left $1,000 to Viney in his will. With these funds, Viney bought a horse and carriage and started his own business. Moses Viney died on January 10, 1909, at the age of 92. Viney is buried at Vale Cemetery in Schenectady, New York.
