= International Council for the Exploration of the Sea =

Intergovernmental science organization

The International Council for the Exploration of the Sea (ICES; French: Conseil International de l'Exploration de la Mer, CIEM) is a regional fishery advisory body and the world's oldest intergovernmental science organization. ICES is headquartered in Copenhagen, Denmark, where its multinational secretariat staff of 51 provide scientific, administrative and secretarial support to the ICES community. It was established on July 22, 1902, in Copenhagen.

== Functions ==
ICES is a leading multidisciplinary scientific forum for the exchange of information and ideas on all aspects of marine sciences pertaining to the North Atlantic, including the adjacent Baltic Sea and North Sea, and for the promotion and coordination of marine research by scientists within its member nations. Its principal functions, both when it was established and continuing to the present time, are to: (i) promote, encourage, develop, and coordinate marine research; (ii) publish and otherwise disseminate results of research; and (iii) provide non-biased, non-political scientific advice to member nation governments and international regulatory commissions.

== History ==
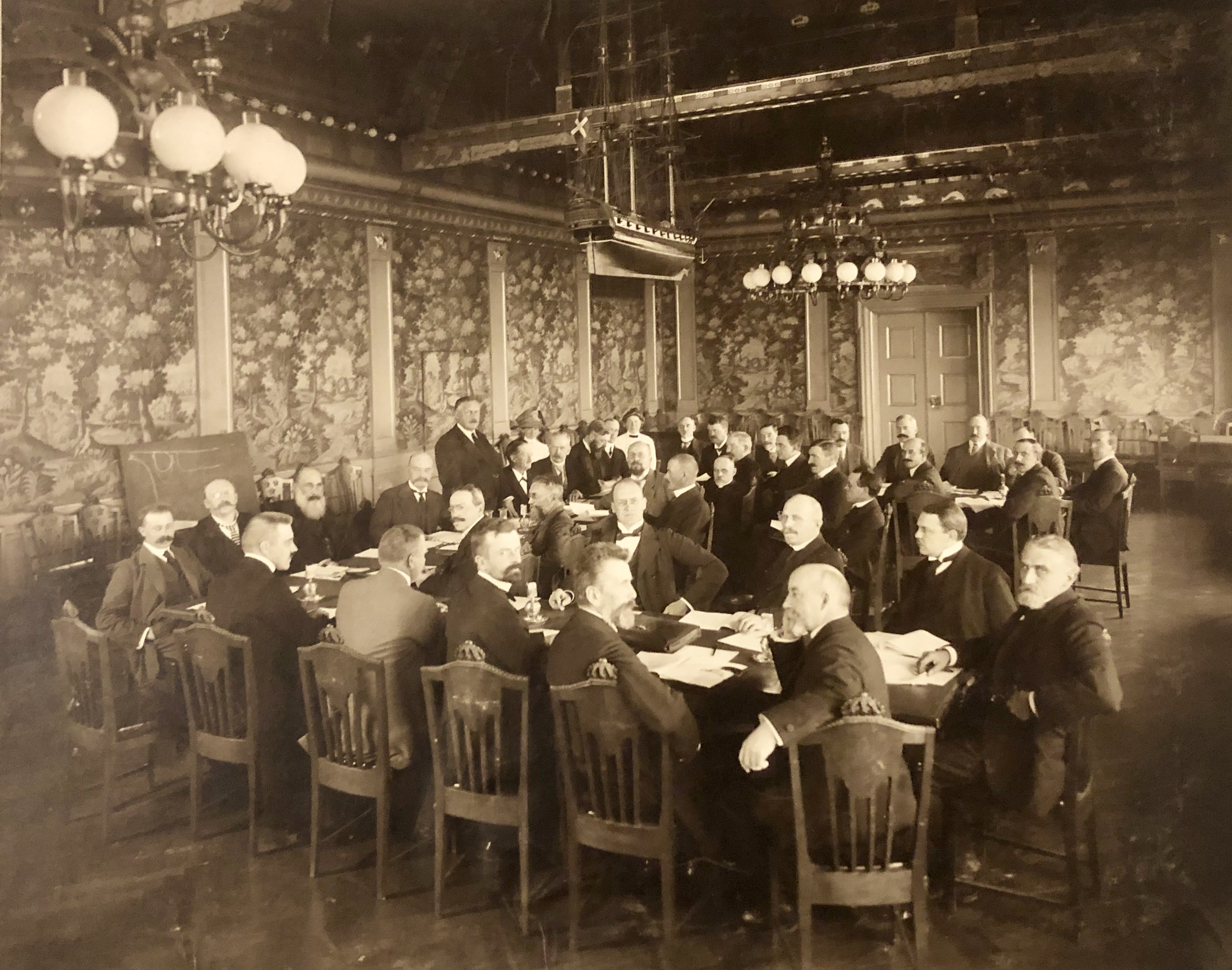
International Council for the Exploration of the Sea with President Walter Archer

In the late 19th century, a growing concern over the well-being of fish stocks in the North Sea coupled with efforts by different groups of scientists in neighboring countries to promote and encourage international scientific marine cooperation resulted in the establishment of ICES on July 22, 1902. The new organization was created in Copenhagen, Denmark by eight founding nations: Denmark, Finland, Germany, the Netherlands, Norway, Sweden, Russia, and the United Kingdom. The council's membership has fluctuated over the years with nations joining/leaving/rejoining at different times as a result of wars and political decisions.

An exchange of letters among the original eight member nations was sufficient to establish the council in 1902. This type of arrangement continued until the early 1960s when this informal status became unacceptable in light of the establishment of the United Nations and its subsidiary bodies as well as other international organizations. Steps were initiated to achieve full international recognition of the council by the host country, Denmark. At a conference convened in Copenhagen on September 7, 1964, a formal convention was signed which subsequently came into force on July 22, 1968, following its ratification by the then 17 member nations.

As of 2026, ICES has 19 member nations, including seven of the eight original members (Russia left in 2025) plus twelve additional nations: Belgium, Canada, Estonia, France, Iceland, Ireland, Latvia, Lithuania, Poland, Portugal, Spain, and the United States. It also has affiliate institutes with observer status from: Australia, Chile, Greece, Peru, and South Africa. Formal observer status has been given to two non-governmental organizations: Worldwide Fund for Nature and Birdlife International.

== Structure ==
The principal decision and policy-making body of ICES is the council. The council consists of a president and two delegates from each of the 20 member nations. Delegates elect the president, first vice-president, and five additional vice-presidents (all for three-year terms) to comprise the bureau or executive committee. The bureau is responsible for carrying out the council's decisions, preparing and convening council meetings, formulating council budgets, appointing a secretariat staff, and performing other tasks as assigned by the council. A finance committee consisting of five delegates provides oversight to the council's fiscal matters. Delegates are also responsible for appointing a general secretary, who serves as the council's chief executive officer and is charged with managing the council's secretariat facilities and staff, finances, meetings, reports, publications, and communications.

The council's scientific work is accomplished by various committees and working groups. During the long history of ICES, the committee and working group structure has changed periodically to reflect the needs of the time. At present, there is an advisory committee (ACOM) that provides advice to clients on fisheries and marine ecosystem issues, a Science Committee (SCICOM; formally the Consultative Committee as established in the ICES Convention) that oversees all aspects of the scientific work, and steering groups that coordinate the more than 100 expert groups covering most aspects of the marine ecosystem that work under them.

A recently prepared strategic plan focuses on science that is broad-based, relevant, and farsighted, and providing advice that is rigorous, reliable, and objective. The plan identifies a mission which calls for 1) establishing effective arrangements to provide scientific advice; 2) informing interested parties and the public objectively and effectively about marine ecosystem issues; 3) coordinating and enhancing physical, chemical, biological, and interdisciplinary research; 4) fostering partnerships with other organizations that share a common interest; and 5) developing and maintaining accessible marine databases. The strategic plan addresses six critical themes: 1) Science, 2) Collaboration, 3) Advice, 4) Data, 5) Communication, and 6) Service support. An action plan specifies the activities that will be undertaken over the coming years in order to achieve the goals. It explains how ICES will continue to advance scientific knowledge and improve scientific advice, whereas the goals in the strategic plan tell what the overall objectives will be.

== ICES work ==
The scientific work of ICES is done by a community of more than 1600 marine scientists from research institutes and universities in member and affiliate nations collaborating to gather information about the marine ecosystem, fill gaps in existing knowledge, and develop unbiased, non-political advice in addressing terms of reference developed each year by the advisory and science committees at the week-long ICES Annual Science Conference (ASC). The reports of the expert groups are presented at the ASCs and made available on the ICES website. Some groups produce special reports, such as “ICES Report on Ocean Climate” or “ICES Zooplankton Status Report”, that are published in the ICES Cooperative Research Report series.

The ASC (formerly called the Statutory Meeting), held every year in September, generally attracts 500–700 scientists from around the world. The programme features plenary lectures by noted scientists, theme sessions of contributed papers addressing timely multidisciplinary topics, and poster sessions. In addition, meetings of the Committees, Bureau, and Council are held to conduct the necessary business of the organization.

During the year, meetings of the more than 100 expert groups and workshops are held either at ICES headquarters in Copenhagen or at venues in member (and occasionally affiliate) nations to address terms of reference developed at the previous ASC.

Symposia are an important part of the ICES work programme, not least because they foster the broadening of the diversity of scientists who participate in ICES activities. ICES welcomes proposals for stimulating symposia on topics that are fundamental to the science components of the ICES Strategic Plan including (a) understanding the physical, chemical, and biological functioning of marine ecosystems, (b) understanding and quantifying human impacts on marine ecosystems, including living marine resources, and (c) evaluating options for sustainable marine-related industries, particularly fishing and mariculture. ICES generally sponsors, either itself or in collaboration with other organizations, at least two, and sometimes as many as seven or eight, scientific symposia in a calendar year.

The ICES Recognition Programme honours individuals whose contributions have improved ICES and the community of scientists associated with it, advanced marine science, and/or exemplify the objective application of ICES scientific information to societal decisions concerning the sustainable use of marine ecosystems. The Programme consists of four awards:

- Outstanding Achievement Award recognizes a sustained, outstanding performance and exceptional contribution by a member of the ICES community whose career has been distinguished by a sustained commitment to excellence in such endeavours as science and research, and leadership.
- Prix d’Excellence Award recognizes the highest level of contribution to the ICES vision of “An international scientific community that is relevant, responsive, sound, and credible, concerning marine ecosystems and their relation to humanity”.
- Merit Awards give formal recognition to the best research paper and poster given at the Annual Science Conference, and to the best up-and-coming new scientist making a presentation at the Annual Science Conference.
- Service Awards recognize the achievements and contributions of outgoing chairs of expert groups, science and advisory groups, and conveners of Annual Science Conference theme sessions and ICES symposia which further the objectives of ICES.

== Advice ==
The council has delegated its advisory authority to the advisory committee (ACOM), which designs strategies and processes for the preparation of advice, manages the advisory processes, and creates and delivers advice, subject to direction from the council. ACOM works on the basis of scientific analyses prepared in the ICES expert groups, and the advisory process includes peer review of the analyses before it can be used as the basis for advice. ACOM has one member from each member nation under the direction of an independent ACOM chair and four vice-chairs appointed by the council.

Unbiased scientific advice is provided to member nation governments and international regulatory commissions in support of the management and conservation of coastal and ocean resources and ecosystems. Advice on the management of over 160 separate fin-fish and shellfish stocks is provided to the North-East Atlantic Fisheries Commission (NEAFC), North Atlantic Salmon Conservation Organization (NASCO), and the European Commission (EC). Advice and scientific information on anthropogenic impacts to the marine environment are provided to the Commission for the Protection of the Marine Environment of the North-East Atlantic (OSPAR), the European Commission (EC), and the Baltic Marine Environment Protection Commission (HELCOM).

== Publications ==
ICES produces a variety of publications, many of which can be accessed on the ICES website. ICES issued its first publication within a year of its establishment. Since then, it has published thousands more, including many that are now considered to be the standard references in their fields. These include:

- ICES Journal of Marine Science (Journal du Conseil) constitutes a primary source for articles on fishery-oriented marine science and is a standard reference for work in the fields of ecology, population studies, plankton research, and physical and chemical oceanography, among others. Since January 2007, the Journal has been published by Oxford University Press.
- ICES Advice annually presents the collected information from the advisory committee (ACOM). The advice is based on an ecosystem approach to management.
- ICES Cooperative Research Report (Rapport des Recherches Collectives) presents reports prepared by ICES Expert Groups and ad hoc groups, and edited reports on cooperative research activities organized by the council.
- Techniques in Marine Environmental Sciences presents detailed descriptions of methods and procedures relating to chemical and biological measurements in the marine environment.
- ICES Identification Leaflets for Plankton (Fiches d’Identification du Plancton) furnish keys, in a standardized form, for the identification of the major plankton species in the North Atlantic.
- ICES Identification Leaflets for Diseases and Parasites of Fish and Shellfish (Fiches d’Identification des Maladies et Parasites des Poissons, Crustacés et Mollusques) serve as diagnostic aids and present, in a standardized format, information about the most important diseases and parasites of fish and shellfish in the North Atlantic and adjacent seas.
- ICES Fisheries Statistics present nominal catch statistics for the Northeast Atlantic for 1973–2000, presented using FishStat Plus software, as well as catch statistics for the entire Atlantic for 1950–1998.
- ICES Marine Science Symposia (Actes du Symposium) contains the scientific papers and proceedings of Symposia and Special Meetings held under the auspices of ICES independently or in collaboration with cooperating organizations. Since 1995, most of these volumes have been published as special numbers in the ICES Journal of Marine Science, but continue to be included in the consecutive numbering system of the ICES MSS series.
- ICES Insight is an annual publication that offers more in-depth articles exploring subjects that feature prominently in ICES work.
- ICES Annual Reports recap ICES annual activities and scientific network.
- ICES Inside Out is a regularly appearing electronic newsletter that updates subscribers on the activities of ICES and its secretariat.
- CD-ROMs contain papers (CM Documents) presented at ICES Annual Science Conferences and may be ordered from the secretariat.
- ICES Newsletters from years past are archived and available at the ICES website.

== Data ==
Scientists working through ICES gather information about the marine ecosystem. The data from this work is held at the ICES Data Center, a cross-discipline department with expertise in fisheries, oceanography and the marine environment. The Data Center holdings include some of the largest databases in the world on these subjects. The Data Center is staffed by data managers and programmers who manage the data submissions and guidelines and develop tools and products to facilitate the use of the data by end users ranging from scientists to policy-makers. In addition, the ICES Data Center acts as the Marine Data Center for the regional marine convention in the North-East Atlantic (OSPAR) and the Baltic Sea (HELCOM).

In the 1970s, an area notation system known as ICES Statistical Rectangles was developed for simplified analysis and visualisation of marine data over the north-east Atlantic region. The component rectangles measure 1 degree of longitude by 0.5 degrees of latitude and are intended to be roughly square in temperate latitudes, approximately 30 nautical miles by 30 nautical miles (55×55 km) at 60°N. More recently, some ICES applications such as "FishFrame", and selected ICES reports have used 0.5×0.5 degree C-squares (part of a fully hierarchical, global system designed for a similar purpose) for equivalent activities, 2 c-squares (at that resolution) occupying exactly the same space as a single ICES rectangle.

== Member countries ==
As of 2026, ICES has 19 member countries, largely clustered around the North Atlantic:

- Belgium 1903
- Canada 1967
- Denmark (founder, 1902)
- Estonia 1924
- Finland (founder, 1902)
- France 1920
- Germany (founder, 1902)
- Iceland 1938
- Ireland 1925
- Latvia 1923
- Lithuania 2006
- The Netherlands (founder, 1902)
- Norway (founder, 1902)
- Poland 1922
- Portugal 1920
- Russian Federation (founder, 1902) to 2025
- Spain 1924
- Sweden (founder, 1902)
- United Kingdom (founder, 1902)
- United States of America 1912
- Italy 1927 and 1956–1974

== List of presidents ==
ICES maintains a complete list of bureau members (presidents, first vice-presidents, vice-presidents and extraordinary members) since its inception on its website.

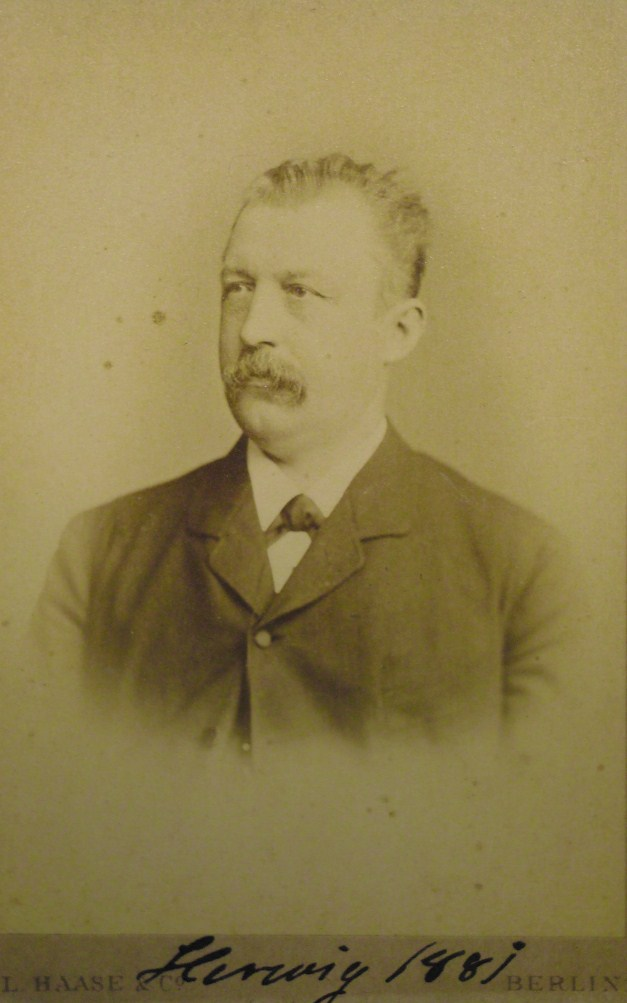
Dr. Walther Herwig

- Dr. Walther Herwig, Germany (1902–1908)
- Walter Archer, C.B. F.R.S.E., UK (1908–1912)
- Mr. F. Rose, Germany (1912–1915)
- Prof. Otto Pettersson, Sweden (1915–1920)
- Mr. Henry G. Maurice, UK (1920–1938)
- Prof. Johan Hjort, Norway (1938–1948)
- Dr. K. A. Andersson, Sweden (1948–1952)
- Mr. A. T. A. Dobson, UK (1952–1955)
- Prof. H .U. Sverdrup, Norway (1955–1957)
- Dr Å. Vedel Tåning, Denmark (1957–1958)
- Dr. J. Furnestin, France (1958–1963)
- Dr. J. Hult, Sweden (1963–1966)
- Dr. A. E. J. Went, Ireland (1966–1969)
- Prof. W. Cieglewicz, Poland (1969–1972)
- M. R. Letaconnoux, France (1972–1975)
- Prof. G. Nikolsky, USSR (1975–1976)
- Mr. B. B. Parrish, UK (1976–1979)
- Prof. Gotthilf Hempel, Fed. Rep. of Germany (1979–1982)
- Prof. W. S. Wooster, USA (1982–1985)
- Mr. O. J. Østvedt, Norway (1985–1988)
- Mr. Jakob Jakobsson, Iceland (1988–1991)
- Mr. D. de G. Griffith, Ireland (1991–1994)
- M A. Maucorps, France (1994–1997)
- Dr. L. Scott Parsons, Canada (1997–2000)
- Prof. Pentti Mälkki, Finland (2000–2003)
- Dr. M. P. Sissenwine, USA (2003–2006)
- Dr. Joe Horwood, UK (2006–2009)
- Dr. Michael Sinclair, Canada (2009–2012)
- Dr. Paul Connolly, Ireland (2012–2015)
- Prof. Dr. Cornelius Hammer, Germany (2015–2018)
- Dr. Fritz W. Köster, Denmark (2018–2021)
- Prof. Dr. William Karp, USA (2021–2024)
- Dr. Carl O'Brian, UK (2024-present)

== List of General Secretaries ==
- Dr. P. P. C. Hoek, The Netherlands (1902–1908)
- Captain C. F. Drechsel, Denmark (1908–1927)
- Captain K. Schøning, Denmark (1927–1932; Administrative Secretary)
- Captain M. W. Nellemose, Denmark (1932–1944)
- Ms. E. Brønniche, Denmark (1944–1945; Acting Administrative Secretary)
- Dr. H. Blegvad, Denmark (1945–1950)
- Dr. P. Jespersen, Denmark (1950–1952)
- Mr. V. Dessau, Denmark (1952–1953)
- Mr. Á. Fridriksson, Iceland (1954–1964)
- Mr. H. Tambs–Lyche, Norway (1964–1983)
- Dr. B. B. Parrish, UK (1983–1989)
- Dr. E. D. Anderson, USA (1989–1993)
- Prof. C. C. E. Hopkins, United Kingdom (1994–1999)
- Mr. D. de G. Griffith, Ireland (2000–2006)
- Dr. G. Hubold, Germany (2006–2012)
- Dr. A. C. Brusendorff, Denmark (2012–2022)
- Dr. Alan Haynie, USA (2022–present)
