= Taunton Elliott Viney =

Pioneer of aerial warfare

Taunton Elliott Viney DSO
- Born: 14 November 1891; Saffron Walden, England
- Died: 21 May 1916 (aged 24); Ostend, Belgium
- Burial place: Mariakerke Cemetery, Ostend (1916); Ostend New Communal Cemetery (relocated 1924)
- Military career
- Allegiance: United Kingdom
- Service: Royal Naval Air Service
- Rank: Flight Lieutenant
- Unit: RNAS No. 5 Wing
- Awards: Distinguished Service Order

Taunton Elliott Viney DSO (14 November 1891 – 21 May 1916) was a pioneer of aerial warfare who served in the Royal Naval Air Service during World War I. He was credited with sinking a German submarine by dropping two 65-pound (29 kg) bombs from his open-cockpit bi-plane on 28 November 1915. He was killed in action when his plane was shot down during an air raid on Ostend in May 1916. His body was recovered by the Germans who, although he had been fighting for their enemy, buried him with full military honours. Photographs of the funeral and military honour guard were dropped over France in a message cylinder.

== Early life ==
Taunton Elliott Viney was the son of Arthur Viney and Edith Henrietta Taunton. He was born at Saffron Walden, Essex, England in 1891. As a young boy, he moved with his family to South Africa where he attended Kingswood College in Grahamstown. He returned to England and completed his education at Mill Hill School in London.

== Service history ==
Viney first joined the war effort in South Africa and served as a private in the Prince Alfred's Guard (August 1914 to February 1915). He returned to England and obtained a commission in the Royal Navy Armoured Car section (RNVS) in April 1915. Shortly afterwards he transferred to the Royal Navy Air Service (RNAS) for pilot training. He obtained his R.A.C. certificate at Eastbourne on 1 July 1915. (Certificate # 1384). During the second half of 1915, Viney flew more than 60 hours and was continually employed on reconnaissance work and hostile aircraft patrol over the enemy's lines. He was described by superiors as a good officer who was hardworking and trustworthy.

== Submarine attack ==
On 28 November 1915, Viney and his observer, Lieut. Le Comte de Sincay, were dispatched to search for a German submarine which had been reported going north between Middelkerke and Ostend. They took off at 11:30 a.m. in Henri Farman No. 3620. When they were off Middelkerke, de Sincay spotted two submarines – one about six miles off shore and the second a mile or two nearer in. They set off in pursuit while at the same time spiralling down from an altitude of 5,000 to 1,500 feet (1,520 to 460 m) They observed that the first submarine had turned northwards and was diving. They then went after the second submarine, dropping to 1,000 feet (300 m) as they went.

Viney described what followed thus: "Finally, we swooped down directly over her, and looking down between my feet through the aeroplane's framework I saw the deck and the conning tower… "I waited an instant and then let go both bombs. They made just one great explosion. Sincay followed the flight of both bombs, and he says they hit their mark. Circling about, I caught a glimpse of her bow and stern rising and her centre crumpling in and then she disappeared. I could not follow many details, of course, because I was busy managing my machine, and the only way one can see is beneath through the legs”.

When the smoke from the bomb had cleared away, the submarine seemed to be sinking, apparently broken amidships, as its ends were stuck up in the air. After circling around for some minutes, Viney observed a large quantity of oil coming up on the spot where the submarine had sunk. For this action, Viney was mentioned in dispatches, recommended for promotion and for a medal by Dover Patrol.

The press hailed Viney as a hero. The story of the attack on the submarine along with Viney's photograph and illustrations of the sinking sub featured in many newspaper articles both in England and overseas.

Cope's Cigarettes made a collectors’ edition card with Viney's portrait on it as part of the VC and DSO Heroes series.

Viney was awarded the Distinguished Service Order in the New Years Honours, 1 January 1916. The exact citation reads: "Flight Sub-Lieutenant Taunton Elliott Viney, R.N. For his services on 28 November 1915, when accompanied by le Lieutenant en second de Sincay as observer, he destroyed a German submarine off the Belgian coast by bombs dropped from an aeroplane".

Viney's promotion to Flight Lieutenant was announced on 1 January 1916.

More recently, the success of the mission has been called in question. Although Viney and de Sincay were credited with sinking the submarine, the loss is not reflected in German records.

== Death and German military funeral ==
Viney was killed five months later on 21 May 1916 when he was based in France while serving with No. 5 (Naval) Wing, RNAS. He failed to return from an air raid on Mariakerke in a Sopwith 1½ Strutter (serial number # 9384).

Viney's death was reported in several newspapers and he was once again hailed as a war hero.

The manner of Viney's death and his funeral are verified by notes in his service record, official correspondence and correspondence from fellow officers, as well as artefacts and photographs which are now in the collection of the Imperial War Museum.

Viney's mother received a letter from E. T. Newton-Clare, Flight Command, Acting CO, No 5 Wing, postmarked 19 July 1916. The letter confirmed that Viney had been killed on 21 May 1916 while on a bombing raid on an aerodrome at Ostend. Newton-Clare writes: “A few days ago a German aeroplane dropped two message bags in the French lines, which were forwarded to us. The message said as far as I can remember the translation ‘Lieutenant Taunton Viney with his bi-plane was shot down by us and fell into the sea. All efforts were made to save him but he was dead when we reached the machine. He is buried …… and was afforded full military honours’. They enclosed two large photographs one of the funeral and one of the grave. On the grave was an inscription “To our brave enemy”. We copied the photographs and enclosed them together with the message to the Headquarters Intelligence Office who will or have forwarded them to the Air Department Admiralty who will send them to you”.

Viney’'s service record summarises this information: "A/67580 V. A. Dover 2.6.16:- Killed 21.5.16. Message dropped at La Panne from a German Aeroplane, that he was picked up in the water off Ostende, and all efforts to restore life were unsuccessful. Buried in Ostende – Mariakerke Cemetery".

The cylinder and the photographs it contained were subsequently delivered to the family.

Personal items found on Viney’s body at the time of his death were saved and stored in Berlin. They were returned to the family by the International Red Cross after the war was over. (Cover letter dated 31 December 1920). These included his wrist watch, wallet, tie pin, a souvenir bullet and French currency.

Viney’s personal effects; a collection of letters, photographs and clippings; his medals; the wooden cross which marked his grave in Ostend; the cylinder which contained the photographs of his funeral; the photographs of the German military funeral; have all been donated to the Imperial War Museum, London.

Viney's service record indicates that he was buried at Ostend, in the Mariakerke Cemetery. He was reburied in the Ostend New Communal Cemetery where his grave is marked by a marble Commonwealth War Graves headstone.

The story of Viney bombing a submarine from an open-cockpit bi-plane captured widespread attention at the time and earned him a place in the history of aerial warfare.
