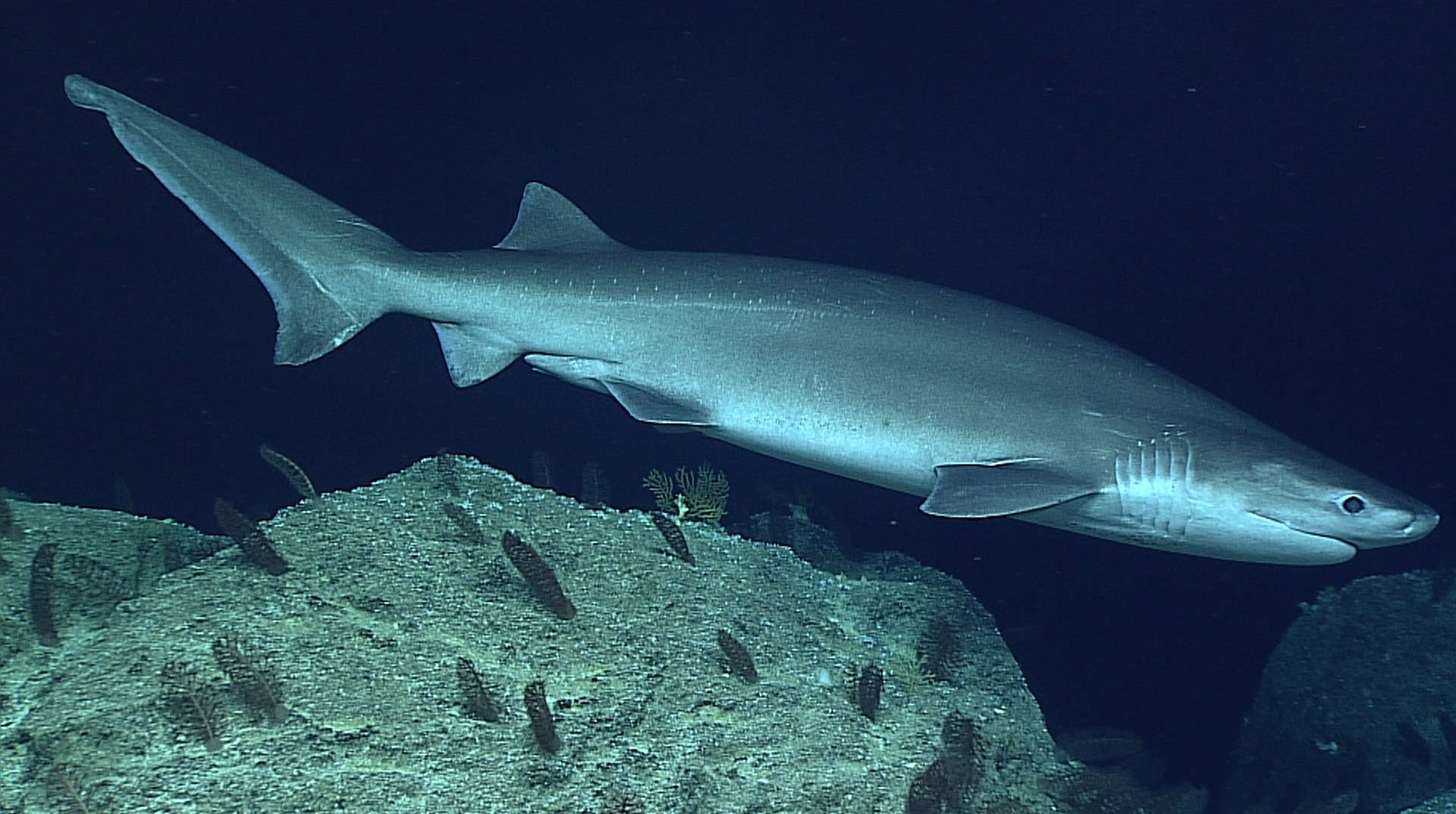
- Bluntnose sixgill shark (Hexanchus griseus)

Scientific classification
- Kingdom: Animalia
- Phylum: Chordata
- Class: Chondrichthyes
- Subclass: Elasmobranchii
- Division: Selachii
- Order: Hexanchiformes
- Family: Hexanchidae
- Genus: Hexanchus; Rafinesque, 1810

Type species
- Squalus griseus Bonnaterre, 1788

Species
- See text

Synonyms
- Monopterhinus de Blainville, 1816; Notidanus Cuvier, 1816

= Hexanchus =

Hexanchus Temporal range: Albian–Present

Genus of sharks

The sixgill sharks are a genus, Hexanchus, of deepwater sharks in the family Hexanchidae. These sharks are characterized by a broad, pointed head, six pairs of gill slits, comb-like, yellow lower teeth, and a long tail. The largest species can grow up to 8 m (26 ft) long and weigh over 600 kg (1,300 lb). They are continental shelf-dwelling and abyssal plain scavengers with a keen sense of smell and are among the first to arrive at carrion, together with hagfish and rattails. They show a characteristic rolling motion of the head when feeding.

They have been found at depths of up to 2,500 m (8,200 ft). Though only two extant species (the bluntnose sixgill shark and the bigeyed sixgill shark) were originally known, a third, the Atlantic sixgill shark, was found to exist.

== Swimming behavior ==
The bluntnose sixgill shark, Hexanchus griseus, is relatively common to scientists. However, very little information exists about its distribution patterns, migrations and behavior. Data on occurrence and behavior of sixgill sharks inhabiting waters north of Spain (Galicia and Cantabrian Sea, NE Atlantic) were obtained from yearly oceanographic trawl surveys. Data obtained from one electronic pop-up tag (Mini PAT), provided information about depth and temperature preferences over 75 days. Mean depth obtained during that period was 913 m (depth range 727–1247 m), and the mean temperature was 10.3 °C, (range 8.0–10.8 °C). Movements up and down in the water column within a single day ranged from 50 to 385 m. No cyclic diel vertical migration was however observed, the shark having moved smoothly without a defined pattern.

The six-gill sharks have the ability to alter their feeding behaviors due to the situation that they are in. A feeding behavior analysis displayed that the six-gill sharks are able to utilize a bite of food compared to other aquatic vertebrates.

== Extant species ==
- Hexanchus griseus (Bonnaterre, 1788) (bluntnose sixgill shark)
- Hexanchus nakamurai Teng, 1962 (bigeyed sixgill shark)
- Hexanchus vitulus Springer & Waller, 1969 (Atlantic sixgill shark)

== Extinct species ==
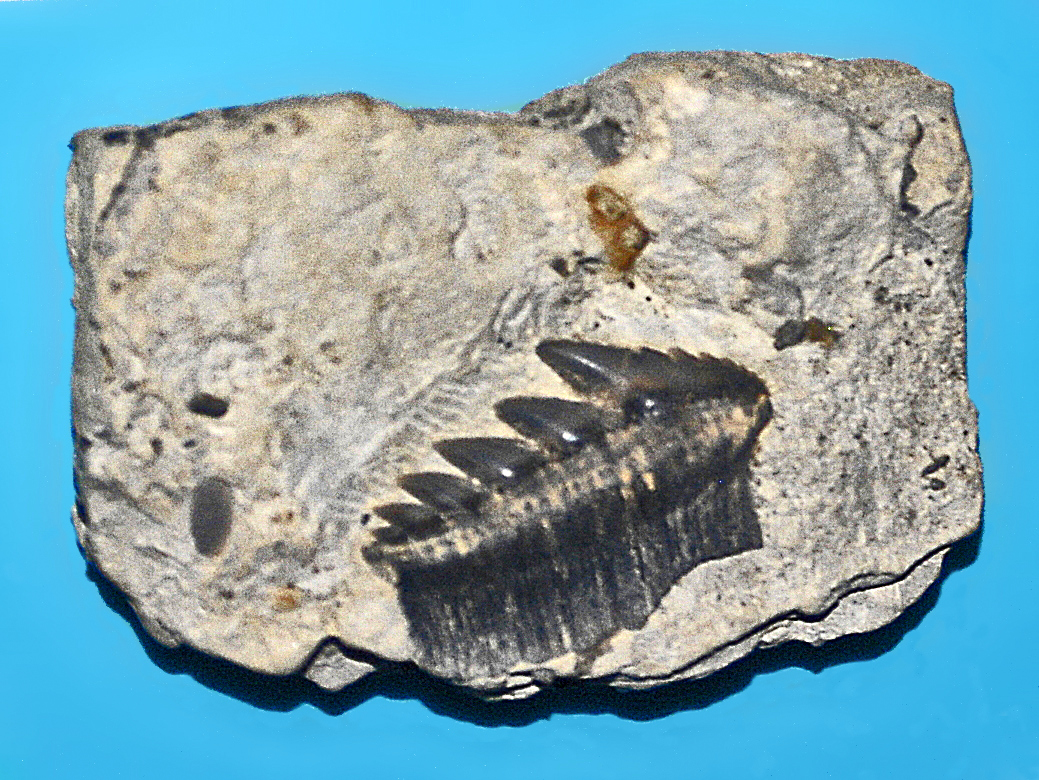
Fossil teeth of Hexanchus andersoni

Based on:

- Hexanchus agassizi Cappetta, 1976
- Hexanchus andersoni (Jordan, 1907)
- Hexanchus casieri Kozlov, 1999
- Hexanchus collinsonae Ward, 1979
- ?Hexanchus gigas (Sismonda, 1861) (likely conspecific with H. griseus)
- Hexanchus gracilis (Davis, 1887)
- Hexanchus hookeri Ward, 1979
- Hexanchus microdon (Agassiz, 1835)
- Hexanchus tusbairicus Kozlov in Zhelezko & Kozlov, 1999

Records earlier than Albian such as Jurassic species H. arzoensis and H. wiedenrothi are later considered as misidentification, the first moved to Notidanoides and later moved to Crassodontidanus.

Almost all fossil Hexanchus species are known only from isolated teeth, aside from H. gracilis which is also known from articulated fossil skeletons.

== See also ==
- Shark teeth
- List of prehistoric cartilaginous fish genera
