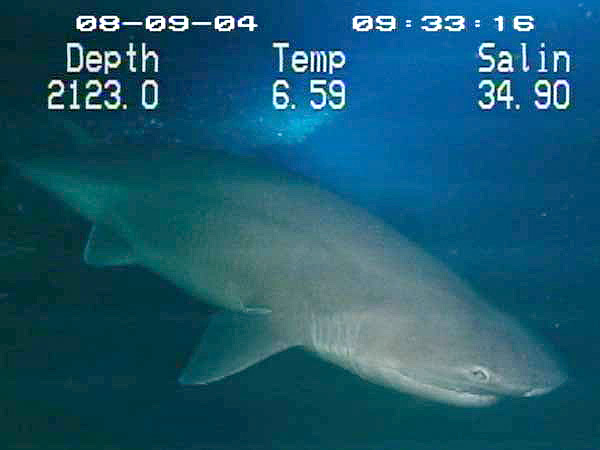

Scientific classification
- Kingdom: Animalia
- Phylum: Chordata
- Class: Chondrichthyes
- Subclass: Elasmobranchii
- Division: Selachii
- Order: Hexanchiformes
- Family: Hexanchidae; J. E. Gray, 1851

Genera
- See text

= Cow shark =

Cow sharks Temporal range: Upper Jurassic–Recent Possible Permian occurrence

Family of sharks

Cow sharks are a shark family, the Hexanchidae, characterized by an additional pair or pairs of gill slits. Its species are placed within the 11 genera: Gladioserratus, Heptranchias, Hexanchus, Notidanodon, Notorynchus, Pachyhexanchus, Paraheptranchias, Pseudonotidanus, Welcommia, Weltonia, and Xampylodon.

== Description ==
Cow sharks are considered the most primitive of all the sharks, as their skeletons resemble those of ancient extinct forms, with few modern adaptations. Their excretory and digestive systems are also unspecialized, suggesting they may resemble those of primitive shark ancestors. A possible hexanchid tooth is known from the Permian of Japan, making the family a possible extant survivor of the Permian–Triassic extinction.

Their most distinctive feature, however, is the presence of a sixth, and, in two genera, a seventh, gill slit, in contrast to the five found in most other sharks. The first pair are not connected across the throat. They range from 1.4 to 5.5 m (4.6 to 18.0 ft) in adult body length.

These cylindrical sharks have a ventral mouth with compressed, comb-like teeth in the lower jaw and smaller, pointed teeth in the upper jaw. They have a short, angular and spinless dorsal fin. The pelvic fins are smaller than the angular pectoral fins. The caudal fin has a notch towards the end.

== Biology ==
Cow sharks are ovoviviparous, with the mother retaining the egg cases in her body until they hatch. They feed on relatively large fish of all kinds, including other sharks, as well as on crustaceans and carrion.

== Fossil record ==
The fossil record of cow sharks consists mainly of isolated teeth. Although skeletal remains for these species have been found from the Jurassic time period, these have been very rare and have only been found in the "Late Jurassic lithographic limestones of South Germany, Nusplingen, Solnhofen, and late Cretaceous calcareous sediments of Lebanon." Due to these sparse records some scientists conclude that the cow shark is now a more "diverse and numerous species".

== Species ==
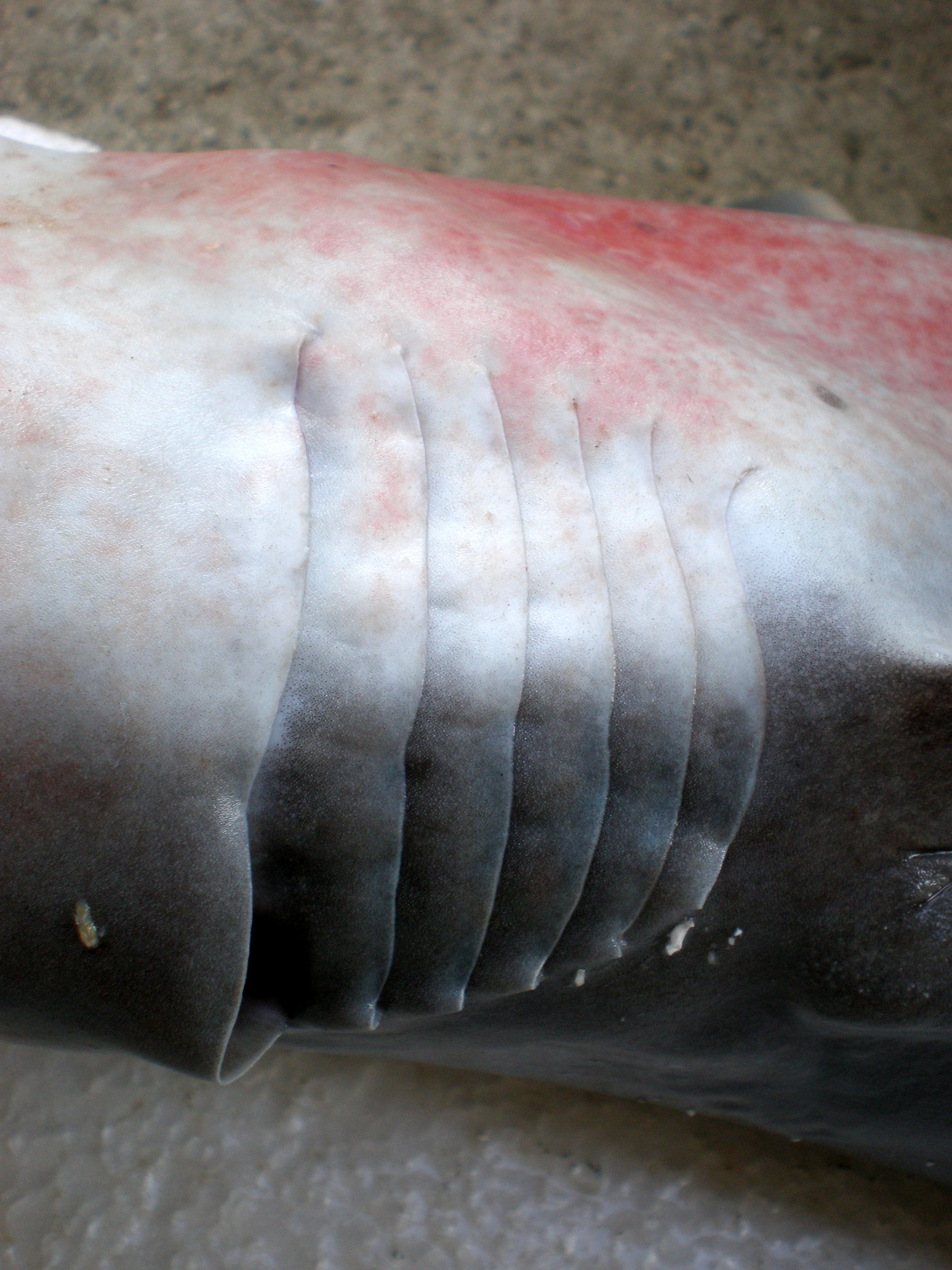
View of the six gill openings of Hexanchus nakamurai

The 40+ species of cow shark (five of which are extant), in 11 genera, are:

- †Gladioserratus Underwood, Goswami, Prasad, Verma & Flynn, 2011
  - †Gladioserratus aptiensis Pictet, 1864
  - †Gladioserratus dentatus Guinot, Cappetta & Adnet, 2014
  - †Gladioserratus magnus Underwood, Goswami, Prasad, Verma & Flynn, 2011
- Heptranchias Rafinesque, 1810
  - Heptranchias perlo (Bonnaterre, 1788) (sharpnose sevengill shark)
  - †Heptranchias ezoensis Applegate & Uyeno, 1968
  - †Heptranchias howelli Reed, 1946
  - †Heptranchias karagalensis Kozlov in Zhelezko & Kozlov, 1999
  - †Heptranchias tenuidens Leriche, 1938
- Hexanchus Rafinesque, 1810
  - Hexanchus griseus (Bonnaterre, 1788) (bluntnose sixgill shark)
  - Hexanchus nakamurai Teng, 1962 (bigeyed sixgill shark)
  - Hexanchus vitulus Springer & Waller, 1969 (atlantic sixgill shark)
  - †Hexanchus agassizi Cappetta, 1976
  - †Hexanchus andersoni Jordan, 1907
  - †Hexanchus casieri Kozlov, 1999
  - †Hexanchus collinsonae Ward, 1979
  - †Hexanchus gracilis Davis, 1887
  - †Hexanchus hookeri Ward, 1979
  - †Hexanchus microdon Agassiz, 1843
  - †Hexanchus tusbairicus Kozlov in Zhelezko & Kozlov, 1999
- †Notidanodon Cappetta, 1975
  - †Notidanodon lanceolatus Woodward, 1886
  - †Notidanodon pectinatus Agassiz, 1843
- Notorynchus Ayres, 1855
  - Notorynchus cepedianus (Péron, 1807) (broadnose sevengill shark)
  - †Notorynchus borealus Jordan & Hannibal, 1923
  - †Notorynchus kempi Ward, 1979
  - †Notorynchus lawleyi Cigala Fulgosi, 1983
  - †Notorynchus primigenius Agassiz, 1843
  - †Notorynchus serratissimus Agassiz, 1843
  - †Notorynchus subrecurvus Oppenheimer, 1907
- †Pachyhexanchus Cappetta, 1990
  - †Pachyhexanchus pockrandti Ward & Thies, 1987
- †Paraheptranchias Pfeil, 1981
  - †Paraheptranchias repens Probst, 1879
- †Pseudonotidanus Underwood & Ward, 2004
  - †Pseudonotidanus semirugosus Underwood & Ward, 2004
- †Welcommia Klug & Kriwet, 2010
  - †Welcommia bodeuri Cappetta, 1990
  - †Welcommia cappettai Klug & Kriwet, 2010
- †Weltonia Ward, 1979
  - †Weltonia ancistrodon Arambourg, 1952
  - †Weltonia burnhamensis Ward, 1979
- †Xampylodon Cappetta, Morrison & Adnet, 2019
  - †Xampylodon brotzeni (Siverson, 1995)
  - †Xampylodon dentatus (Woodward, 1886)
  - †Xampylodon diastemacron Santos et al., 2024
  - †Xampylodon loozi (Vincent, 1876)
