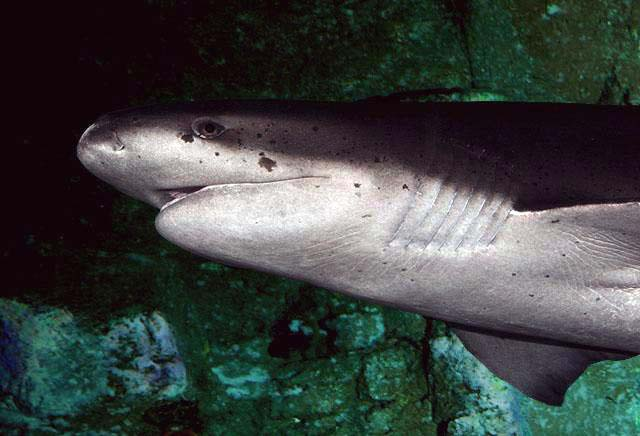
- Broadnose sevengill shark (Notorynchus cepedianus)
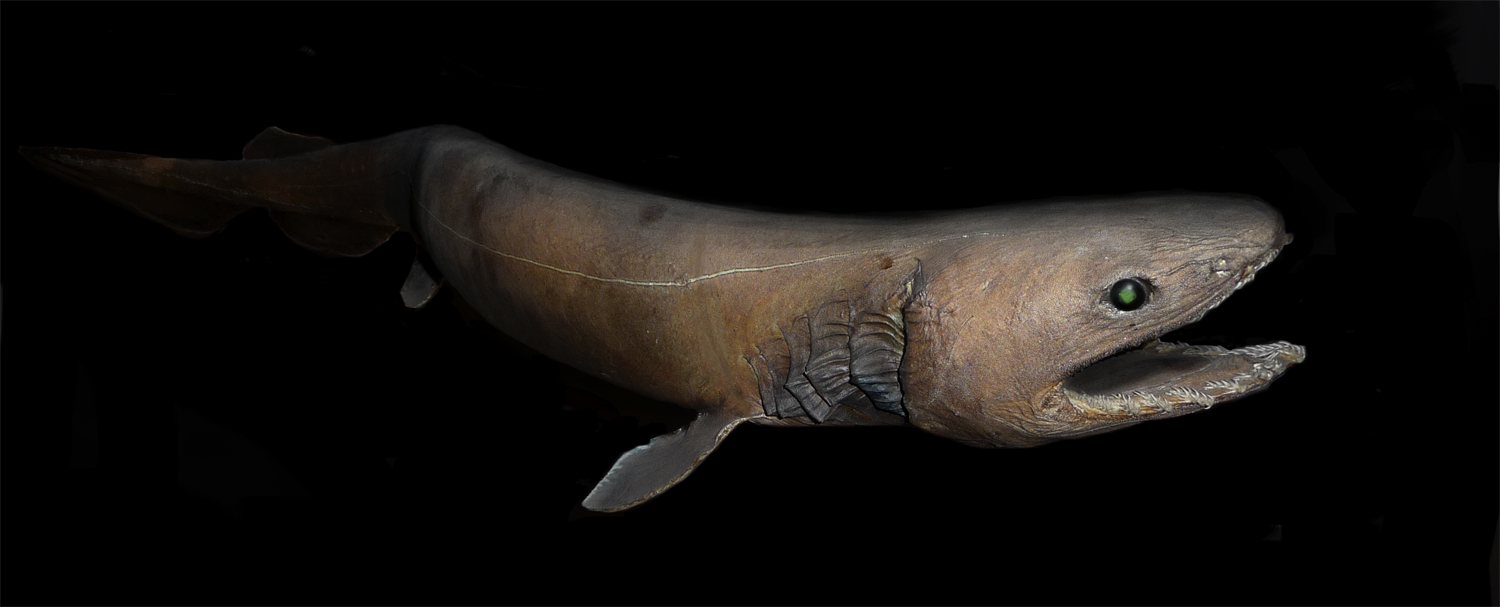
- Frilled shark (Chlamydoselachus anguineus)

Scientific classification
- Kingdom: Animalia
- Phylum: Chordata
- Class: Chondrichthyes
- Subclass: Elasmobranchii
- Division: Selachii
- Superorder: Squalomorphi
- Series: Hexanchida
- Order: Hexanchiformes; F. de Buen, 1926

Families
- See text

= Hexanchiformes =

Hexanchiformes Temporal range: Early Jurassic–Recent Possible Permian record

Order of sharks

The Hexanchiformes /hɛkˈsæŋkɪfɔːrmiːz/ are a primitive order of sharks, numbering just seven extant species in two families, Chlamydoselachidae and Hexanchidae. Chlamydoselachidae are also known as frilled sharks, these sharks are very rare fishes and typically reside in deeper waters. Hexanchidae are also known as cow sharks and are the lesser known of the two types of Hexanchiformes and also reside in deep waters.

== Taxonomy ==
Due to their primitive anatomy, hexanchiforms were previously considered the most basal group of sharks. However, more recent phylogenetic studies indicate that while primitive, they in fact belong to the superorder Squalomorphi, which also contains dogfishes, angelsharks, and sawsharks, although they are thought to be the most basal member of the group.

== Description ==
Hexanchiform sharks have one spineless dorsal fin located over or behind the pelvic fins. Therefore, they do not have a "main dorsal fin", that is, the large dorsal fin located towards the middle of the back, unlike other orders of sharks. The vertebral column extends into the long dorsal lobe of the caudal fin, while the ventral lobe is either small or absent. They have either six or seven gill slits, located in front of the pectoral fins. They have a large mouth, with eyes on either side of the head. The spiracles are small and located well above and behind the eyes. The eyes have no nictitating membrane.

The frilled sharks of the genus Chlamydoselachus are very different from the cow sharks, and have been proposed to be moved to a distinct order, Chlamydoselachiformes. However, genetic studies have found them to be each other's closest relatives, and they share certain derived features supporting them both being in the same order.

Shark teeth similar to modern hexanchids and echinorhinids are known from Devonian deposits in Antarctica and Australia, as well as Permian deposits in Japan. If these are in fact hexanchids, this may be the only extant order of elasmobranchs to have survived the Permian extinction (and by extension, the oldest extant order of elasmobranchs). However, the Australian/Antarctic shark teeth, from the family Mcmurdodontidae, have also been found to lack a multilayer enameloid layer covering the tooth crown, something found in all modern sharks and most Devonian sharks, indicating that they are neoselachians of uncertain affinity or even indeterminate chondrichthyans. The occurrence of derived sharks in the Devonian is also irreconcilable with the results of all phylogenetic estimates in the group.

It is debated whether the extinct families Orthacodontidae and Paraorthacodontidae belong to the Hexanchiformes or the extinct Synechodontiformes. However, the Shark-References database currently lists them as members of the Hexanchiformes.

== Distribution ==
Species are widespread and found across most of the world. They are most common in cold deep water in the tropics, but are also found closer to the shore in more temperate regions.

== Reproductive biology ==
Hexanchiforms are viviparous, meaning they give birth to live young. Males have two testes which are capable of producing sperm year-round and females have two ovaries and two uteri. Chlamydoselachus africana Males have two testes which produce sperm and females have two ovaries and ovulate from summer to autumn. Embryos develop only in the right uterus of a female. The research regarding the reproductive Biology of the Hexanchidae family is limited but thought to be similar, as no year-round research has been done regarding female hexanchids.

== Classification ==
=== Living species ===
- Family Chlamydoselachidae Garman 1884 (frilled sharks)
  - Chlamydoselachus Garman, 1884
    - Chlamydoselachus africana Ebert & Compagno, 2009 (Southern African frilled shark)
    - Chlamydoselachus anguineus Garman, 1884 (frilled shark)
- Family Hexanchidae J. E. Gray 1851 (cow sharks)
  - Heptranchias Rafinesque, 1810
    - Heptranchias perlo (Bonnaterre, 1788) (sharpnose sevengill shark)
  - Hexanchus Rafinesque, 1810
    - Hexanchus griseus (Bonnaterre, 1788) (bluntnose sixgill shark)
    - Hexanchus nakamurai Teng, 1962 (bigeyed sixgill shark)
    - Hexanchus vitulus Daly-Engel, 2018 (Atlantic sixgill shark)
  - Notorynchus Ayres, 1855
    - Notorynchus cepedianus (Péron, 1807) (broadnose sevengill shark)

=== Extinct species ===
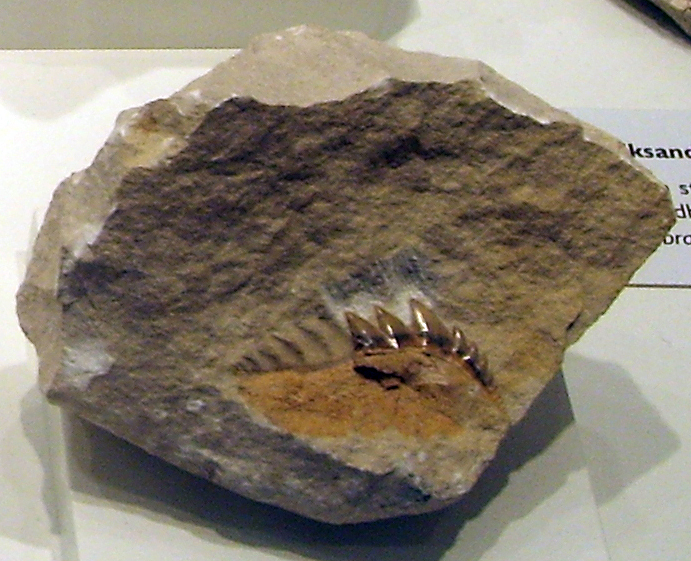
Notidanodon sp. fossil at the Geological Museum, Copenhagen

- Suborder Chlamydoselachoidi
  - Family Chlamydoselachidae
    - Chlamydoselachus Garman, 1884
      - Chlamydoselachus balli Cappetta, Morrison & Adnet, 2019
      - Chlamydoselachus gracilis Antunes & Cappetta, 2002
      - Chlamydoselachus lawleyi Davis, 1887
      - Chlamydoselachus tobleri Leriche, 1929
    - Dykeius Cappetta, Morrison & Adnet, 2019
      - Dykeius garethi Cappetta, Morrison & Adnet, 2019
    - Rolfodon Cappetta, Morrison & Adnet, 2019
      - Rolfodon bracheri (Pfeil, 1983)
      - Rolfodon fiedleri (Pfeil, 1983)
      - Rolfodon goliath (Antunes & Cappetta, 2002)
      - Rolfodon keyesi (Mannering & Hiller 2008)
      - Rolfodon landinii (Carrillo-Briceño et al. 2014)
      - Rolfodon ludvigseni Cappetta, Morrison & Adnet, 2019
      - Rolfodon tatere (Consoli, 2008)
      - Rolfodon thomsoni (Richter & Ward, 1990)
- Suborder Hexanchoidei
  - Family Crassodontidanidae
    - Crassodontidanus Kriwet & Klug, 2011
      - Crassodontidanus serratus Fraas, 1855
      - Crassodontidanus wiedenrothi Thies, 1983
    - Notidanoides Maisey, 1986
      - Notidanoides muensteri Agassiz, 1843
    - Notidanus Cuvier, 1816
      - Notidanus amalthei Oppel, 1854
      - Notidanus atrox Ameghino, 1899
      - Notidanus intermedius Wagner, 1862
      - Notidanus nikitini Chabakov & Zonov, 1935
    - Pachyhexanchus Cappetta, 1990
      - Pachyhexanchus pockrandti Ward & Thies, 1987
  - Family Hexanchidae
    - Gladioserratus Underwood, Goswami, Prasad, Verma & Flynn, 2011
      - Gladioserratus aptiensis Pictet, 1864
      - Gladioserratus dentatus Guinot, Cappetta & Adnet, 2014
      - Gladioserratus magnus Underwood, Goswami, Prasad, Verma & Flynn, 2011
    - Heptranchias Rafinesque, 1810
      - Heptranchias ezoensis Applegate & Uyeno, 1968
      - Heptranchias howellii Reed, 1946
      - Heptranchias karagalensis Kozlov in Zhelezko & Kozlov, 1999
      - Heptranchias tenuidens Leriche, 1938
    - Hexanchus Rafinesque, 1810
      - Hexanchus agassizi Cappetta, 1976
      - Hexanchus andersoni Jordan, 1907
      - Hexanchus casieri Kozlov, 1999
      - Hexanchus collinsonae Ward, 1979
      - Hexanchus gracilis Davis, 1887
      - Hexanchus hookeri Ward, 1979
      - Hexanchus microdon Agassiz, 1843
      - Hexanchus tusbairicus Kozlov in Zhelezko & Kozlov, 1999
    - Notidanodon Cappetta, 1975
      - Notidanodon lanceolatus Woodward, 1886
      - Notidanodon pectinatus Agassiz, 1843
    - Notorynchus Ayres, 1855
      - Notorynchus borealus Jordan & Hannibal, 1923
      - Notorynchus kempi Ward, 1979
      - Notorynchus lawleyi Cigala Fulgosi, 1983
      - Notorynchus primigenius Agassiz, 1843
      - Notorynchus serratissimus Agassiz, 1843
      - Notorynchus subrecurvus Oppenheimer, 1907
    - Pachyhexanchus Cappetta, 1990
      - Pachyhexanchus pockrandti Ward & Thies, 1987
    - Paraheptranchias Pfeil, 1981
      - Paraheptranchias repens Probst, 1879
    - Pseudonotidanus Underwood & Ward, 2004
      - Pseudonotidanus semirugosus Underwood & Ward, 2004
    - Welcommia Cappetta, 1990
      - Welcommia bodeuri Cappetta, 1990
      - Welcommia cappettai Klug & Kriwet, 2010
    - Weltonia Ward, 1979
      - Weltonia ancistrodon Arambourg, 1952
      - Weltonia burnhamensis Ward, 1979
    - Xampylodon Cappetta, Morrison & Adnet, 2019
      - Xampylodon brotzeni (Siverson, 1995)
      - Xampylodon dentatus (Woodward, 1886)
      - Xampylodon loozi (Vincent, 1876)
  - ?Family Orthacodontidae
    - Occitanodus Guinot, Cappetta & Adnet, 2014
      - Occitanodus sudrei Guinot, Cappetta & Adnet, 2014
    - Sphenodus Agassiz, 1843
      - Sphenodus alpinus Gümbel, 1861
      - Sphenodus longidens Agassiz, 1843
      - Sphenodus lundgreni Davis, 1890
      - Sphenodus macer Quenstedt, 1852
      - Sphenodus nitidus Wagner, 1862
      - Sphenodus longidens Agassiz, 1843
      - Sphenodus planus Agassiz, 1843
      - Sphenodus rectidens Emmons, 1858
      - Sphenodus robustidens Seguenza, 1900
      - Sphenodus tithonius Gemmellaro, 1871
      - Sphenodus virgai Gemmellaro, 1871
- ?Family Komoksodontidae Cappetta, Morrison & Adnet, 2019
  - Komoksodon Cappetta, Morrison & Adnet, 2019
    - Komoksodon kwutchakutch Cappetta, Morrison & Adnet, 2019
- ?Family Paraorthacodontidae
  - Macrourogaleus Fowler, 1947
    - Macrourogaleus hassei
  - Paraorthacodus Glückman, 1957
    - Paraorthacodus andersoni (Case, 1978)
    - Paraorthacodus antarcticus Klug, Kriwet, Lirio & Nuñez, 2008
    - Paraorthacodus arduennae Delsate, 2001
    - Paraorthacodus clarkii (Eastman, 1901)
    - Paraorthacodus conicus (Davis, 1890)
    - Paraorthacodus eocaenus (Leriche, 1902)
    - Paraorthacodus jurensis (Schweizer, 1964)
    - Paraorthacodus recurvus (Trautschold, 1877)
    - Paraorthacodus rossi Cappetta, Morrison & Adnet, 2019
    - Paraorthacodus turgaicus Glikman, 1964

== Species ==
Family	Image	Common name	Genera	Species	Description
Chlamydoselachidae		Frilled sharks	1 extant 1 extinct	2 extant 12 extinct	Frilled sharks contain only two extant species of deepsea creatures which are typically weakened in areas closer to the surface. The most widely known species still surviving is the frilled shark, known as a living fossil, along with the Southern African frilled shark, found along coastal areas of South Africa. Several extinct species are known.
†Crassodontidanidae		†Crassodontidanidae	4	8	Extinct
Hexanchidae		Cow sharks	3 extant 5 extinct	5 extant 31 extinct	Cow sharks are considered the most primitive of all the sharks, because their skeletons resemble those of ancient extinct forms, with few modern adaptations. Their excretory and digestive systems are also unspecialised, suggesting that they may also resemble those of their primitive shark ancestors. Their most distinctive feature, however, is the presence of a sixth, and, in two genera, a seventh, gill slit, in addition to the five found in all other sharks. They range from 1.4 metres (4.6 ft) to over 5.5 metres (18 ft) in adult body length.
†Komoksodontidae?		†Komoksodontidae?	1	1	Extinct
†Orthacodontidae?		†Orthacodontidae?	2	12	Extinct
†Paraorthacodontidae?		†Paraorthacodontidae?	2	11	Extinct

== See also ==
- Time range of Hexanchiformes species
