= Hexanchus microdon =

Hexanchus microdon Temporal range: Cenomanian–Danian Possible Aptian to Ypresian record

Scientific classification
- Kingdom: Animalia
- Phylum: Chordata
- Class: Chondrichthyes
- Subclass: Elasmobranchii
- Division: Selachii
- Order: Hexanchiformes
- Family: Hexanchidae
- Genus: Hexanchus
- Species: †H. microdon

Binomial name
- †Hexanchus microdon (Agassiz, 1835)

Synonyms
- Notidanus microdon Agassiz, 1835

Hexanchus microdon is an extinct species of sixgill shark that was found worldwide from the mid-Cretaceous to the Paleocene.

== Taxonomy ==
One of the earliest known sixgill sharks in the fossil record, it was described by Louis Agassiz in 1835, but was originally identified by Gideon Mantell in 1822 as a Squalus tooth. The name has been often applied to any shark teeth from the Late Cretaceous of Europe with a small morphology reminiscent of the modern bigeye sixgill shark, and taxonomic revisions are likely necessary, especially due to the non-informative nature of the type specimens. Teeth from as late as the Early Eocene of Morocco have also been referred to this species, even while concurrent Hexanchus species in other regions are known by different names. In contrast, at some areas such as the Late Cretaceous of Germany, it appears to be the only Hexanchus species confidently present. Hexanchus gracilis, a species known from complete fossil skeletons from the Sahel Alma site in Lebanon, may be potentially synonymous with it.

== Occurrences ==
Based on the Paleobiology Database:

=== Early Cretaceous ===
- ?Aptian of Iwate, Japan (Hiraiga Formation)

=== Late Cretaceous ===
==== Europe ====
- Cenomanian of Germany (Hesseltal Formation)
- Cenomanian of England (Cambridge Greensand)
- Cenomanian of Lithuania (Labguva Formation)
- Turonian of Germany (Salder Formation)
- Coniacian of France (Lezennes Chalk)
- Santonian of Germany (Burgsteinfurt Formation)
- Campanian of England (upper English Chalk)
- Campanian of Belgium (Trivières Chalk)
- Campanian of Germany (Beckum Formation)
- Maastrichtian of Saratov, Russia (Karsun Formation)
- Maastrchtian of Austria (Gerhartsreit Formation)

==== North America ====
- Campanian of British Columbia, Canada (Northumberland Formation)

==== Asia ====
- Cenomanian of Hokkaido, Japan
- Coniacian of Fukushima, Japan (Ashizawa Formation)
- Santonian of Kumamoto, Japan (Hinoshima Formation)
- Campanian of Ehime, Japan (Izumi Group)
- Campanian of Israel (Mishash Formation)
- Maastrichtian of Israel (Ghared Formation)

==== Africa ====
- Coniacian of Angola (Itombe Formation)
- Campanian of Angola
- Maastrichtian of Egypt
- Maastrichtian of Morocco (Ganntour Basin)

=== Paleogene ===
==== Europe ====
- Danian of Denmark (Rødvig Formation)

==== North America ====
- Danian of New Jersey, US (Hornerstown Formation)
- ?Thanetian of California, US (Lodo Formation)
