= Time range of Hexanchiformes species =

Timeline of shark order

The shark order Hexanchiformes (in a broad sense, not only comprising the cow sharks, but also including the frilled sharks, Chlamydoselachidae) is often considered the most primitive of extant sharks, since they share some features with Paleozoic and early-Mesozoic shark groups as the Cladoselachiformes. Thus, it is interesting to see how far back the fossil record of this order reaches.

== Family Chlamydoselachidae ==
Species	Lower Cretaceous						Upper Cretaceous						Paleocene			Eocene				Oligocene		Miocene						Pliocene			Pleistocene			Holocene	Extant
Species	B	V	H	B	A	A	C	T	C	S	C	M	D	S	T	Y	L	B	P	R	C	A	B	L	S	T	M	Z	P	G	L	M	U	Holocene	Extant
Chlamydoselachus thomsoni																																			
Chlamydoselachus gracilis																																			
Chlamydoselachus goliath																																			
Proteothrinax baumgartneri																																			
Chlamydoselachus fiedleri																																			
Chlamydoselachus tobleri																				.															
Chlamydoselachus bracheri																																			
Chlamydoselachus lawleyi																																			
Chlamydoselachus anguineus																																			

== Family Hexanchidae ==
Species	Lower Cretaceous						Upper Cretaceous						Paleocene			Eocene				Oligocene		Miocene						Pliocene			Pleistocene			Holocene	Extant
Species	B	V	H	B	A	A	C	T	C	S	C	M	D	S	T	Y	L	B	P	R	C	A	B	L	S	T	M	Z	P	G	L	M	U	Holocene	Extant
Heptranchias howellii												.																							
Heptranchias ezoensis																																			
Heptranchias tenuidens																																			
Heptranchias perlo																											.	.	-	-	-	-	-	-	

Genus	Species	Early Jurassic				Middle Jurassic				Upper Jurassic			Lower Cretaceous						Upper Cretaceous						Paleocene			Eocene				Oligocene		Miocene						Pliocene			Pleistocene			Holocene	Extant
Genus	Species	H	S	P	T	A	B	B	C	O	K	T	B	V	H	B	A	A	C	T	C	S	C	M	D	S	T	Y	L	B	P	R	C	A	B	L	S	T	M	Z	P	G	L	M	U	Holocene	Extant
Hexanchus	arzoensis																																														
	microdon “agassizii”																	.							.			.				.															
	gracilis																																														
	collinsonae																																														
	hookeri																																														
	agassizi																											.																			
	griseus																															.		-	-	-	-	-	-	-	-	-	-	-	-	-	
	nakamurai “vitulus”																																														
	griseus “andersoni” “gigas"																																	.													
Notidanoides	-										.	-	-	-	-	-	-	-	-	-	-	-																									
Notidanodon	lanceolatus														.		-																														
	antarcti																																														
	dentatus																																														
	pectinatus																																														
	brotzeni”																																														
	loozi”																																														
Notorynchus	“Notidanus” aptiensis”																																														
	“Notidanus” intermedius																																														
	“Notidanus” lawleyi																																														
	“Notidanus” munsteri																																														
	“Notidanus” cepedianus “primigenius” “kempi”																												.			.		.													
	“Notidanus” serratissimus																																														
	“Notidanus” serratus																																														
