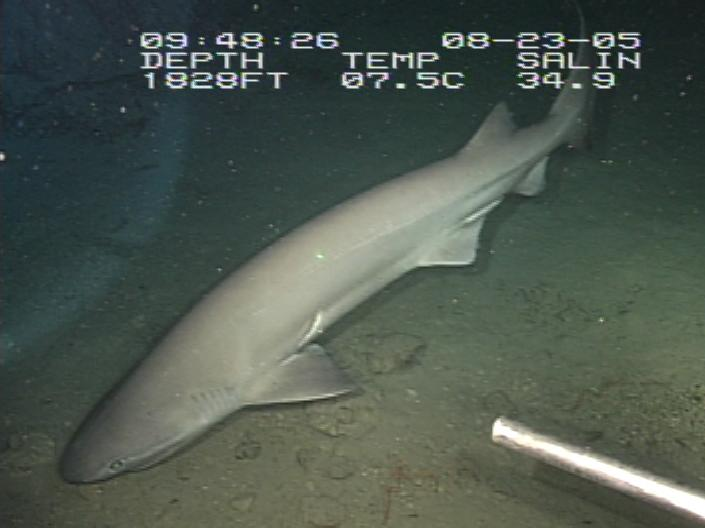

Conservation status
- Near Threatened (IUCN 3.1)

Scientific classification
- Kingdom: Animalia
- Phylum: Chordata
- Class: Chondrichthyes
- Subclass: Elasmobranchii
- Division: Selachii
- Order: Hexanchiformes
- Family: Hexanchidae
- Genus: Hexanchus
- Species: H. griseus

Binomial name
- Hexanchus griseus (Bonnaterre, 1788)
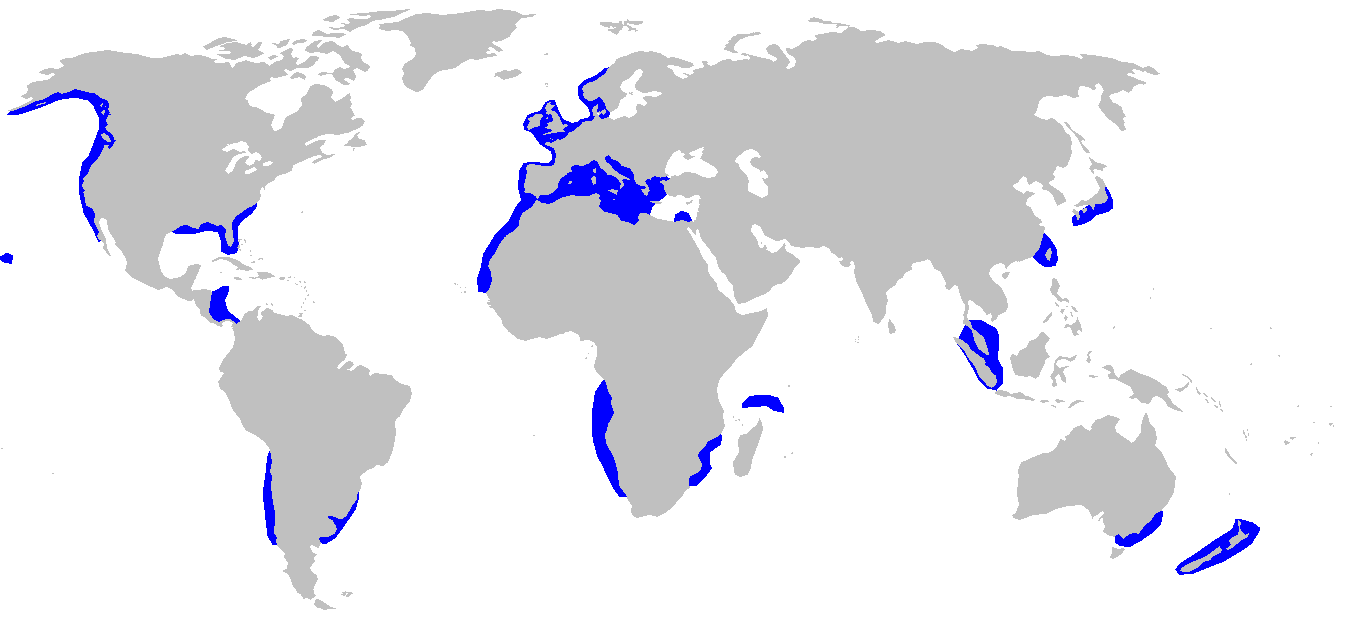
- Range of bluntnose sixgill shark (in blue)

= Bluntnose sixgill shark =

Bluntnose sixgill shark Temporal range: Early Miocene to present

Species of shark

The bluntnose sixgill shark (Hexanchus griseus), often simply called the cow shark, is the largest hexanchoid shark, growing to 18 ft (5.5 m) in length. It is found in tropical and temperate waters worldwide. Its diet varies widely depending on the habitat.

The bluntnose sixgill is a species of sixgill shark, of genus Hexanchus, which also consists of two other species: the bigeye sixgill shark (Hexanchus nakamurai) and the Atlantic sixgill shark (Hexanchus vitulus). By analyzing their base pairs of mitochondrial genes COI and ND2, these species can be easily distinguished.

== Taxonomy ==
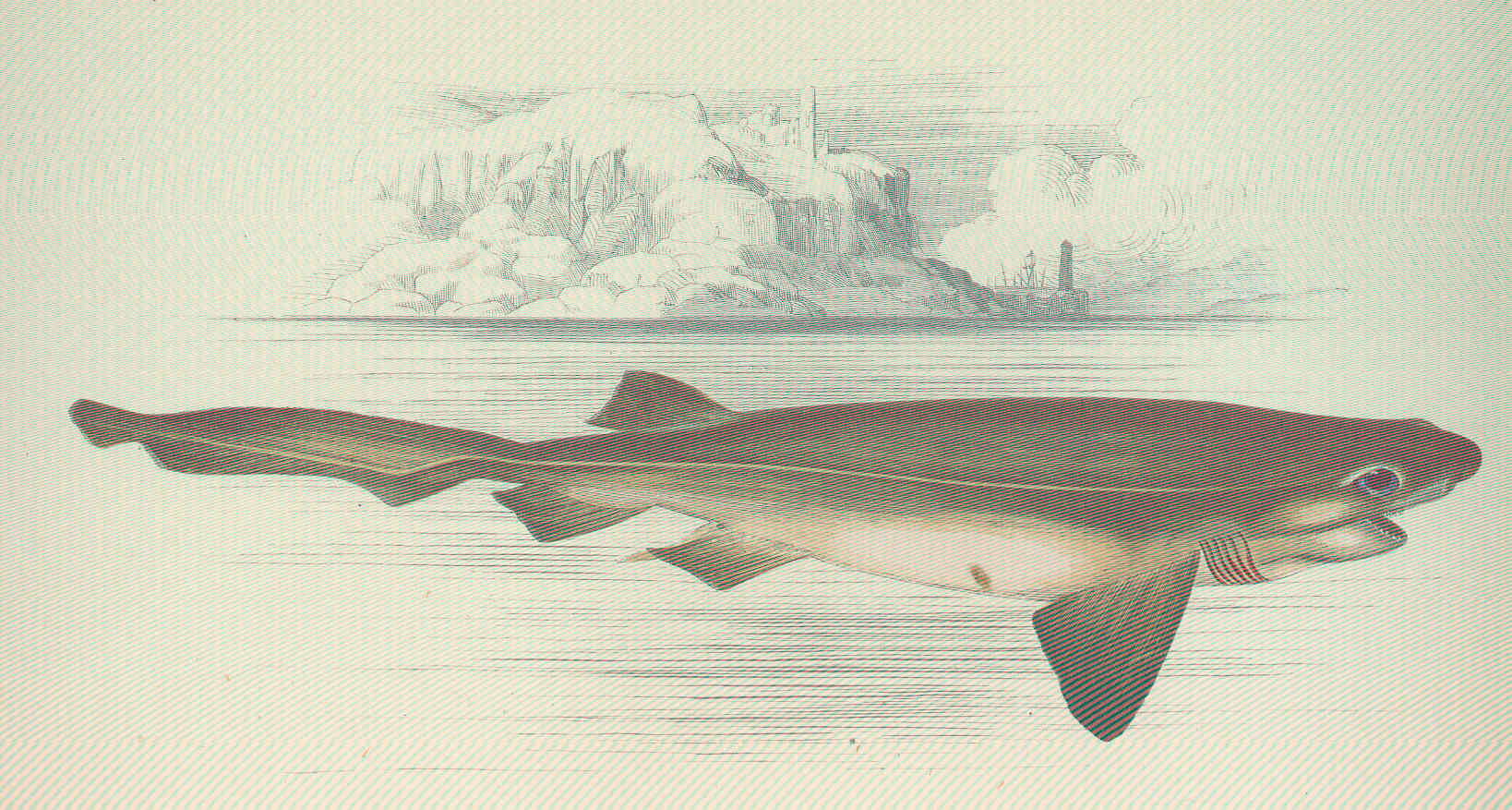
1877 drawing of the bluntnose sixgill shark

The first scientific description of the bluntnose sixgill shark was authored in 1788 by Pierre Joseph Bonnaterre. As a member of the family Hexanchidae, it has more close relatives in the fossil record than living relatives. The related living species include the dogfish, the Greenland shark, and other six- and seven-gilled sharks. Some of the shark's relatives date back 200 million years. This shark is a notable species due to both its primitive and current physical characteristics.

Very large fossil teeth of sixgill sharks, known as †Hexanchus gigas (Sismonda, 1857) are known rarely worldwide from the Early Miocene to the Pliocene. Such teeth are very similar to those of H. griseus aside from their large size, and it is uncertain whether H. gigas is synonymous with H. griseus.

== Description ==
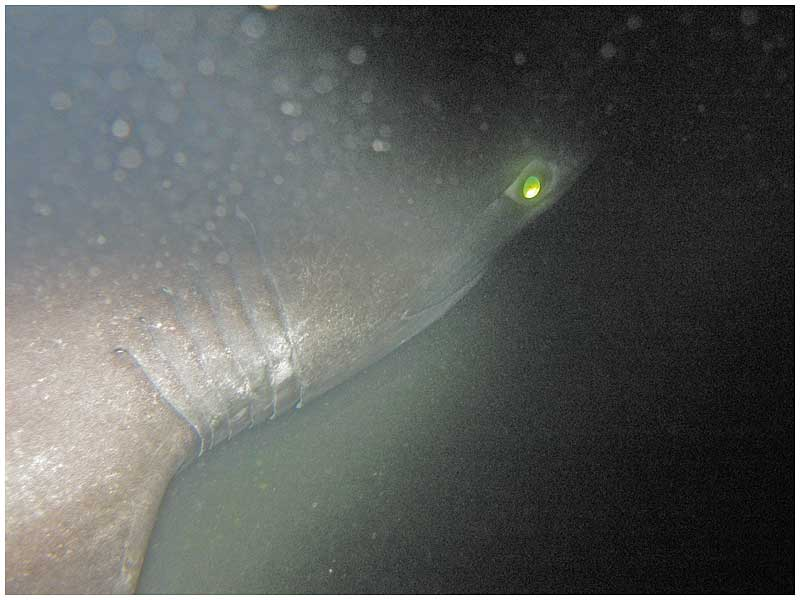
The Bluntnose sixgill shark is one of few shark species that have six gill pairs, rather than five as in most other sharks

The bluntnose sixgill shark has a large body and long tail. The snout is blunt and wide, and its eyes are small. There are 6 rows of saw-like teeth on its lower jaw and smaller teeth on its upper jaw. Skin color ranges from tan, through brown, to black. It has a light-colored lateral line down the sides and on the fins' edges, and darker colored spots on the sides. They also get stains/spots on their neural arches, and the number of stains increase as they get older. Its pupils are black and its eye color is a fluorescent blue-green. The bluntnose sixgill shark can grow to 5.5 m (18 ft). A work from the 1880s stated that a bluntnose sixgill shark caught off Portugal in 1846 measured 9 m (30 ft). This specimen was originally reported in an 1846 work and said to be only 0.68 m (2.2 ft) long. Adult males generally average between 3.1 and 3.3 m (10 and 11 ft), while adult females average between 3.5 and 4.2 m (11 and 14 ft). The average weight of an adult bluntnose sixgill shark is 500 kilograms (1,100 pounds). Large specimens may reach 6 m (20 ft) in length and 1,000 kg (2,200 lb) in weight.

The bluntnose sixgill shark resembles many of the fossil sharks from the Triassic period. A greater number of Hexanchus relatives occur in the fossil record than are alive today. They have one dorsal fin located near the caudal fin. The pectoral fins are broad, with rounded edges. The six gill slits give the shark its name. Most common sharks today only have five gill slits.

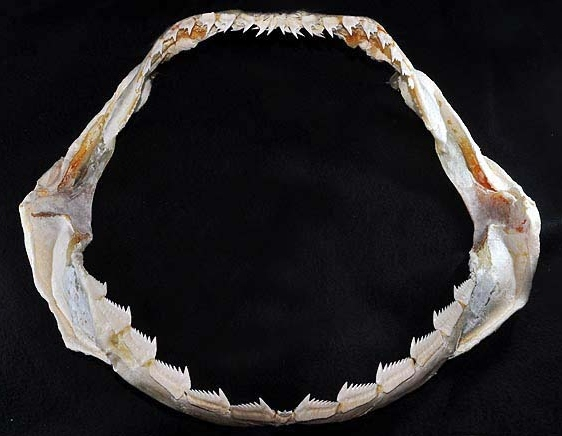
Jaws, male

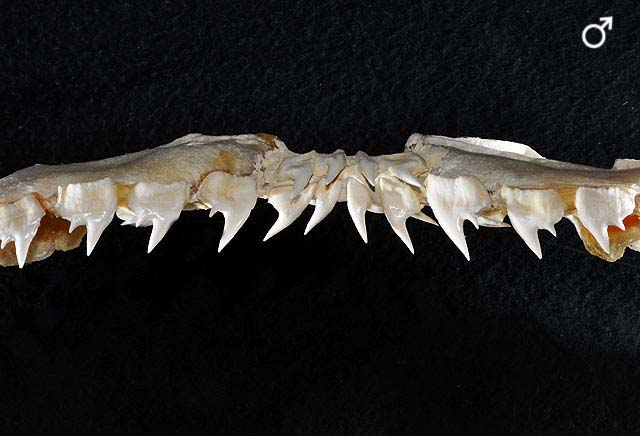
Upper teeth, male

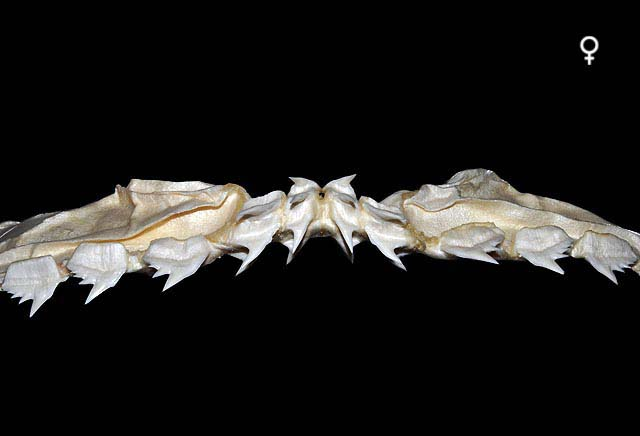
Upper teeth, female

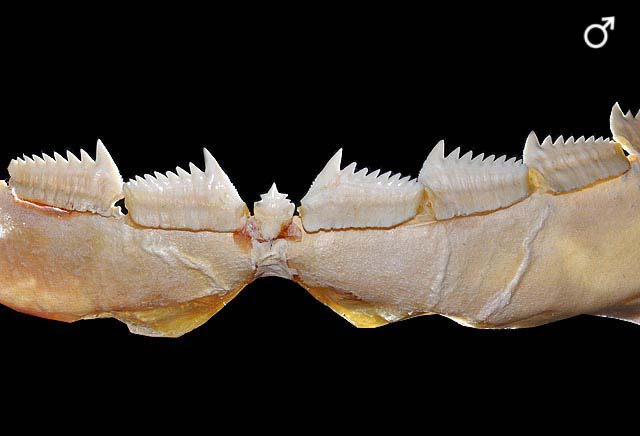
Lower teeth, male

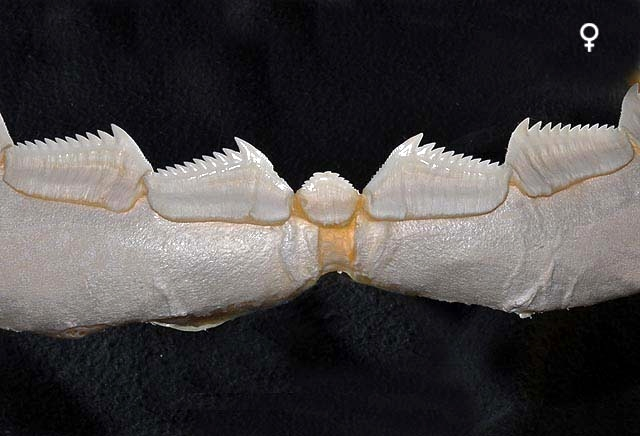
Lower teeth, female

== Growth and development ==
In general, sixgills increase in length and weight with maturity. The maturity of male sharks is usually determined by the length of their claspers. While juveniles have short and flexible claspers, mature male sixgills have rigid, calcified longer ones. On the other hand, the length-weight relationship of females tends to increase very rapidly as they approach sexual maturity.

== Distribution and habitat ==
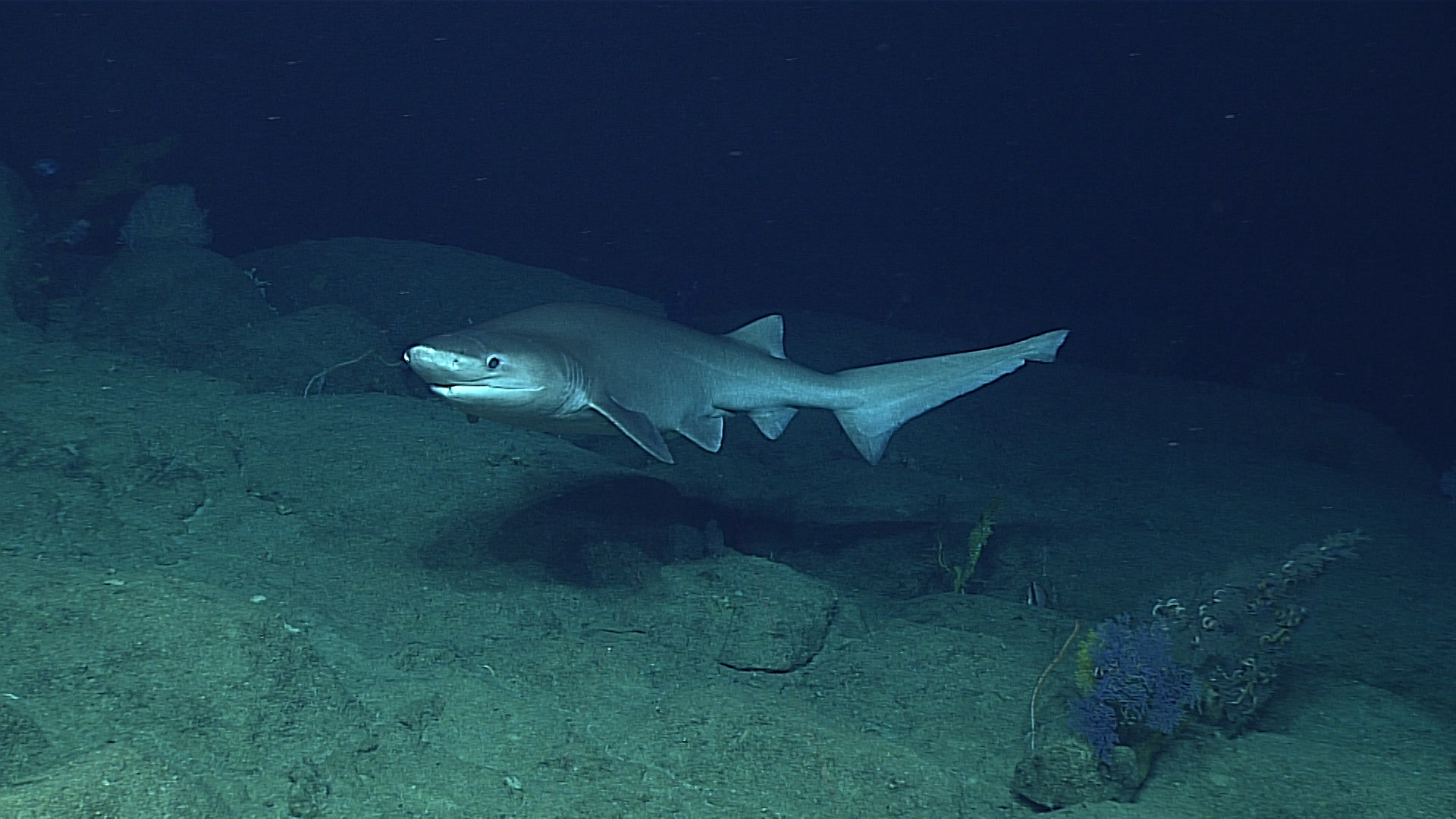
The bluntnose sixgill is often found near the ocean floor.

With a global distribution in tropical and temperate waters, the bluntnose sixgill shark is found in a latitudinal range between 65°N and 48°S in the Atlantic, Indian, and Pacific oceans. It has been seen off the coasts of North and South America from North Carolina to Argentina and Alaska to Chile. In the eastern Atlantic, it has been caught from Iceland to Namibia, in the Indo-Pacific it has been caught from Madagascar north to Japan and east to Hawaii and in the Mediterranean it has been caught in Greece and Malta. Fossilized remains of this species from the Middle Miocene have also been discovered in the Duho Formation of South Korea. It typically swims near the ocean floor or in the water column over the continental shelf in poorly lit waters. It is usually found 180–1,100 m (590–3,610 ft) from the surface, inhabiting the outer continental shelf, but its depth range can extend from 0–2,500 m (0–8,202 ft). Juveniles will swim near the shoreline in search of food, sometimes in water as shallow as 12 m (39 ft), but adults typically stay at depths greater than 100 m (330 ft). It can be seen near the ocean's surface only at night.

On December 2, 2017, the ROV camera of Paul Allen's research vessel RV Petrel captured video footage an adult bluntnose sixgill shark lurking around a World War II shipwreck in Ormoc Bay, Philippines at a depth of 259 m (850 ft). This was the first time the species was photographed in Philippine waters. In 2018, a sixgill shark was filmed near the Saint Peter and Saint Paul Archipelago, midway between Brazil and Africa, at a depth of around 120 metres (400 ft). In 2019, the remains of a pregnant bluntnose sixgill shark were found on a Vancouver Island beach, north of Victoria, British Columbia. On 18 October 2019, a large bluntnose sixgill shark measuring over 3 metres (9.8 ft) and weighing 900 kilograms (2,000 lb) was found dead on the beach of Ürkmez in the western province of Izmir, Turkey.

Being in such a deep area of the ocean, these sharks have developed the behavior of undergoing diel vertical migration (DVM) in order to have more access to food. Research has found that it takes more time for the sixgills to have to swim back down to their natural habitat of the bathypelagic rather than to swim up during the night to find food in the more populated zones. As such, it can be inferred that they have some sort of adaptation that aids buoyancy to ensure that these sharks are able to float more easily. An example of this DVM occurrence was found off the coast of Oahu, Hawaii, whereby 4 sixgills' behaviors were studied. Between midnight and 3 AM, the 4 sharks swam up to a minimum depth of 300 m (980 ft) whereas at about noon, they reached their maximum depth of between 600 and 700 m (2,000 and 2,300 ft). This shows a daily pattern whereby the sixgills are going up during the nights when it is darker and colder to forage for food up in the shallower depths but as morning comes and light and higher temperatures starts to come in more intently again, the sharks go back down to their original habitat to maintain a lower metabolic rate, ensuring that they will be able to use the nutrients from whatever they ate during the night slowly, reducing the need for them to search for more food throughout the day. Another study found that the motivating factor for the bluntnose sixgill sharks' DVM behavior was foraging. Researchers were able to rule out predator and competitor avoidance as potential reasons for the vertical movement patterns because they found pairs of sharks with synchronized movements, indicating that the sharks were responding to the same stimuli. The sharks demonstrated distinct and consistent patterns of vertical migration despite size, sex, and spatial scales, showing that foraging behavior can most likely be seen as the reason for the diel vertical patterns of sixgill sharks. Lastly, the bluntnose sixgill shark has consistent seasonal movements. They move north during the winter and spring and south during the summer and fall. In this study as well, researchers were able to determine that these movement patterns can be attributed to the seasonal movements of prey over other reasons.

== Feeding behavior ==
Feeding behavior of the sixgills

Sixgill sharks possess variability in their feeding mechanisms that could have contributed to their evolutionary success and global distribution. These sharks are able to protrude their jaws and vary their methods of feeding depending on the situation. They utilize sawing and lateral tearing techniques to manipulate food. Sixgill sharks also lower their pectoral fins right before they strike in order to stop forward progressions, making it easier for them to forage.

== Biology and ecology ==
Although sluggish in nature, the bluntnose sixgill shark is capable of attaining high speeds for chasing and catching its prey using its powerful tail. Because of its broad range, it has a wide variety of prey, including bony fish (such as dolphinfish, billfish, flounder, and lingcod), hagfish, lampreys, rays, chimaeras, squid, crabs, shrimps, snails, seals, cetaceans, carrion, and other (smaller) sharks (such as spiny dogfish, longnose dogfish, shortnose dogfish, and prickly sharks). The bluntnose sixgill shark is therefore classified as a generalist species, and is less likely to be affected by scarcity in any one of its food sources. A study done in 1986, with 28 sixgills, discovered that the most abundant meal they were able to obtain include cartilaginous and bony fishes, followed by marine mammals and several invertebrates. As time passes, however, it seems that their stomach contents have changed. In 1994, it was found that of 137 samples, the major prey groups were cephalopods, teleost fishes, chondrichthyans and marine mammals. This difference in results could be due to several reasons. Firstly, as noticed in the different sample sizes of the two studies, it could be due to technology back then not being advanced enough to fully study the stomach contents and capture enough samples, leading to a skewed result for the 1986 study. Next, as human activities have increased over the years, it could affect the availability of food for the sixgills in the deep. There are many other potential factors that may have affected the diet of sixgills.

Bluntnose sixgill sharks are also positively buoyant as hypothesized earlier. During vertical movements, the sixgill sharks demonstrate more swimming efforts for the descent than the ascent. This is indicated by the greater number of tail beats and the sharks' ability to glide upwards for several minutes. The positive buoyancy can help the sharks to hunt stealthily by approaching prey from below undetected since the upward gliding permits minimal movement. It can also be advantageous for their Diel vertical migrations. Since the sharks spend their days in colder water, their metabolic rates decline. Positive buoyancy can help them to glide upwards with minimal swimming involved during their evening migrations.

Reproduction is ovoviviparous with embryos receiving nourishment from a yolk sac while remaining inside the mother. Litters are large and typically have 22–108 pups measuring 60–75 cm (24–30 in) at birth, and the largest recorded pup is 82 centimetres (32 in). New pups are also born with a lighter belly color than adults. This form of cryptic coloration or camouflage is used to disguise the pup's appearance. A high mortality rate of the young pups is presumed, owing to the large litter size. The gestation period is unknown, but is probably more than two years, based on the gestation time of other hexanchiform sharks like the frilled sharks. Females reach sexual maturity at 4.5 m (15 ft) in length and 18–35 years in age, while males reach sexual maturity much earlier at 3.15 m (10.3 ft) in size and 11–14 years in age. Many biologists believe that the male bluntnose sixgill shark's teeth are specially adapted for courtship. The male nips at the female's gill slits using its longer-cusped teeth. This action is thought to entice the female into mating. Evidence of this hypothesis is that female bluntnose sixgill sharks show up with seasonal scars around their gill slits, which apparently is from breeding with males. Males and females are thought to meet seasonally between May and November.

== Human interaction ==
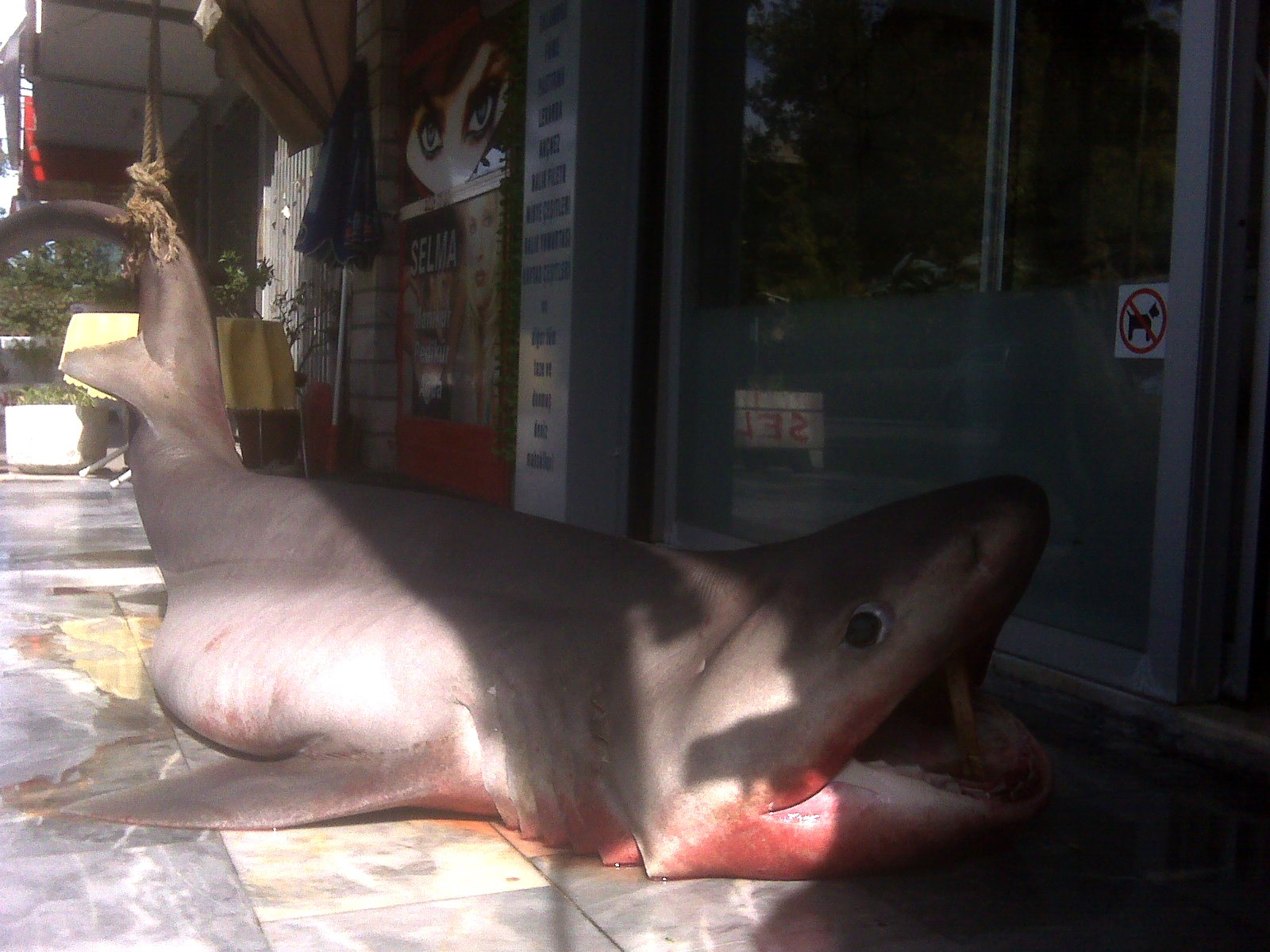
The bluntnose sixgill shark is sold for its meat and oil.

The bluntnose sixgill shark is listed as Near Threatened by the International Union for Conservation of Nature (IUCN) because, despite its extensive range, its longevity and popularity as a sport fish makes it vulnerable to exploitation and unable to sustain targeted fishing for very long. Although population data is lacking in many areas for this species, certain regional populations have been classified as severely depleted. Although it is usually caught as bycatch, it is also caught for food and sport. In June 2018, the New Zealand Department of Conservation classified the bluntnose sixgill shark as "Not Threatened" with the qualifiers "Data Poor" and "Secure Overseas" under the New Zealand Threat Classification System.

This species is harmless to humans unless provoked.

Encounters between Indonesian trepangers and the sixgill shark may account for tales of the Ground Shark of the Timor Sea.

== Recent research ==
=== Blue Planet II ===
Blue Planet II, a documentary on marine organisms produced by the BBC, featured an episode focusing on deep sea organisms and environments. In this episode, bluntnose sixgill sharks were filmed feeding on a whale fall. In behind-the-scenes footage, the sharks attacked the deep sea submersible as crew members tried to collect the video footage. Thinking that they were competition, the sharks used their bodies to try to fend off the submarine, only leaving it behind once they realized that the sub was not there to feed. The film crew was able to obtain useful video footage of the sixgills that they later featured in the episode. As a worldwide, well-known, scientific platform, it hence helped with the awareness of the existence of these species of sharks.

=== Tagging sixgills in their natural habitat ===
Since 2005, scientists have successfully been able to tag sixgill sharks as a means of studying their behavior. However, it was not until 2019 that a sixgill was tagged in its natural deep-sea habitat for the first time. Researchers from Florida State University, the Florida Museum of Natural History, the Cape Eleuthera Institute, and OceanX hence decided to join forces to tag a deep-sea shark through use of a submersible, and they succeeded in doing so. After 3 months of leaving the tag on the sixgill, the tag was thought to float up to the surface where scientists will be able to collect the data from that tag. Overall, this study showed how advancements in technology has helped scientists be better able to study marine life. Instead of having to go on an expedition for years at a time, the scientists here simply had to attach a tag onto the sixgill once and collect the data another time. The tag simply showed behavioral results of the sixgills.

=== Sixgills in the Salish Sea ===
Using data collected over 20 years, scientists with the Seattle Aquarium, NOAA Fisheries Northwest Fisheries Science Center, and the Washington Department of Fish and Wildlife learned that the Salish Sea, which includes Puget Sound, WA, comprises one of the world's few known pupping grounds for the species. The team reported on the genetic analysis of 274 sixgill shark tissue samples collected over 16 years. It revealed that litters of pups such as those collected from stranded females in 2007 and 2019, had multiple fathers. That showed that females mate with multiple males during breeding seasons, a strategy that increases genetic diversity.
