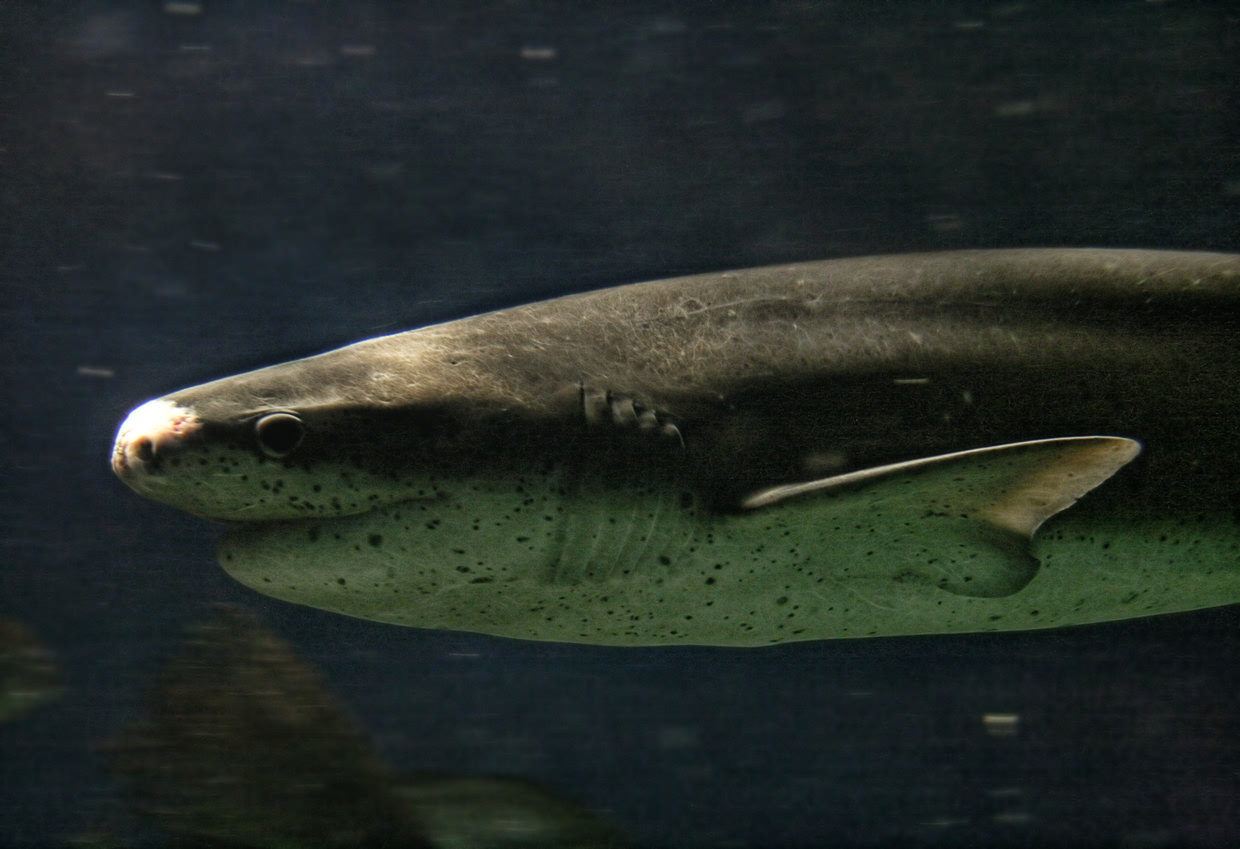
- Broadnose sevengill shark (Notorynchus cepedianus)

Scientific classification
- Kingdom: Animalia
- Phylum: Chordata
- Class: Chondrichthyes
- Subclass: Elasmobranchii
- Division: Selachii
- Order: Hexanchiformes
- Family: Hexanchidae
- Genus: Notorynchus; Ayres, 1855

Type species
- Squalus cepedianus Péron, 1807

Species
- See text

= Notorynchus =

Genus of sharks

Notorynchus is a genus of deepwater sharks in the family Hexanchidae. There is one extant species.

== Extant species ==
- Broadnose sevengill shark (Notorynchus cepedianus) Péron, 1807

== Extinct species ==
- Notorynchus borealus Jordan & Hannibal, 1923
- Notorynchus kempi Ward, 1979
- Notorynchus lawleyi Cigala Fulgosi, 1983
- Notorynchus primigenius Agassiz, 1843
- Notorynchus serratissimus Agassiz, 1843
- Notorynchus subrecurvus Oppenheimer, 1907
