= Vitulus =

Vitulus may refer to:

- Vitulus Aureus (the golden calf), a book by Dutch alchemist Johann Friedrich Schweitzer
- Hexanchus vitulus, the bigeyed sixgill shark, a shark species
- a Roman cognomen
