= Komoksodon =

Komoksodon Temporal range: Campanian–Selandian

Scientific classification
- Kingdom: Animalia
- Phylum: Chordata
- Class: Chondrichthyes
- Subclass: Elasmobranchii
- Division: Selachii
- Order: Hexanchiformes
- Family: †Komoksodontidae; Cappetta, Morrison & Adnet, 2019
- Genus: †Komoksodon; Cappetta, Morrison & Adnet, 2019

Species
- †K. kwutchakuth Cappetta, Morrison & Adnet, 2019

Extinct genus of hexanchiform shark

Komoksodon is an extinct genus of hexanchiform shark known from the Late Cretaceous to the Paleocene. It is the only member of the monotypic family Komoksodontidae.

It is represented by a single known species, K. kwutchakuth from the Campanian Northumberland Formation of Canada. However, teeth have also been identified from the Campanian of Angola and the middle Paleocene of New Zealand, suggesting that Komoksodon briefly survived the Cretaceous-Paleogene extinction. All these localities appear to be deep-water habitats, suggesting that Komoksodon was a deep-water specialist much like other hexanchiforms. The New Zealand teeth were previously assigned to the orthacodontid Sphenodus before being reanalyzed prior to the genus's description, and likely represent an undescribed taxon due to certain morphological differences from the Canadian species.

The teeth can be distinguished from all other extant and extinct sharks by their highly distinctive and complex root morphology, which suggests that teeth could closely interlock with one another. These structures are somewhat similar to those of chlamydoselachid sharks, suggesting that komoksodontids are also hexanchiforms.

The genus name honors the Kʼómoks people of British Columbia, who assisted with the naming of the species kwutchakuth, which means "shark" in the unwritten Comox language.
