= Ground shark (cryptid) =

Mystery shark of the Timor Sea

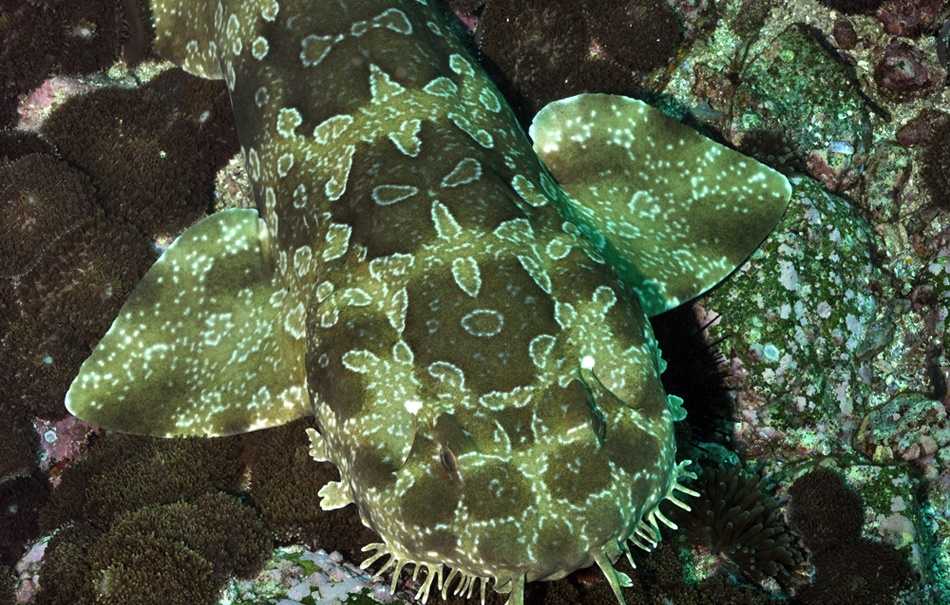
Spotted wobbegong (Orectolobus maculatus)

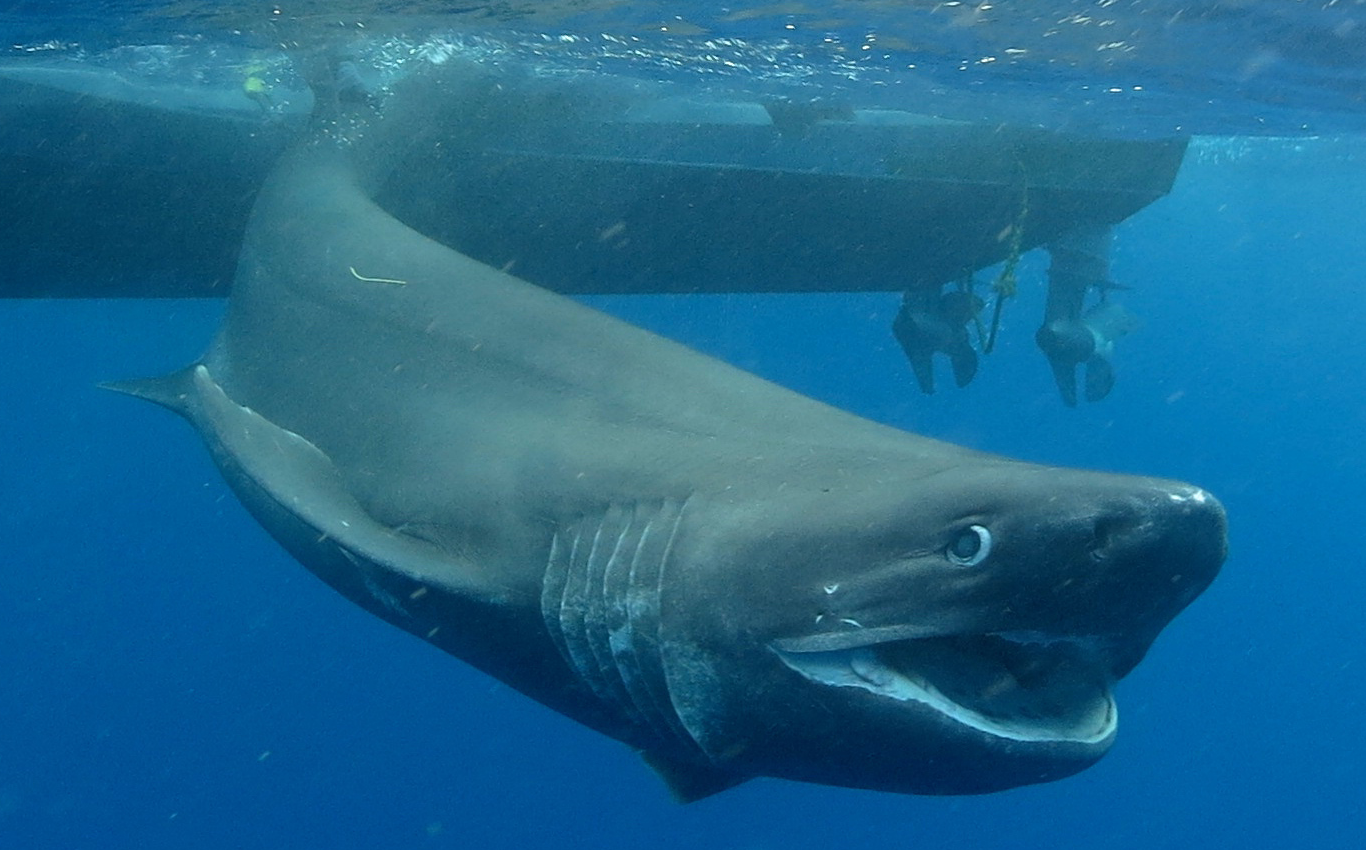
Bluntnose sixgill shark (Hexanchus griseus)

In 1941’s The Lungfish and the Unicorn, Willy Ley described the ferocious ground shark of the Timor Sea as larger than "the well-known man-eating shark" but without the prominent dorsal fin. Rather than swim on the surface, the ground shark was said to lie in wait for its prey on the seafloor.

== Explanations ==
Cryptozoologist and author Karl Shuker suggested an undiscovered species of giant wobbegong as the potential culprit. In his 1991 article The Search for Monster Sharks, he noted the largest known wobbegongs can exceed three metres (9.8 ft) in length but are generally not considered dangerous to humans.

In a 2026 article, Karl Brandt proposed the bluntnose sixgill shark (Hexanchus griseus) as the Timor Sea’s mystery fish. The sixgill, known as hiu tahu putih (tofu shark) in the Lesser Sundas, lacks a prominent central dorsal fin and can grow to more than five metres (16 ft) in length. Cruising the seafloor by day, the sixgill's positive buoyancy allows it to ascend through the water column at night, a behaviour known as diel vertical migration, to ambush unsuspecting prey.
