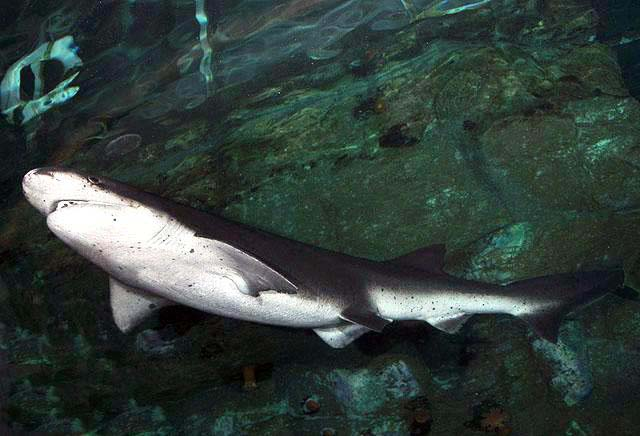
- At Aquarium of the Bay

Conservation status
- Vulnerable (IUCN 3.1)

Scientific classification
- Kingdom: Animalia
- Phylum: Chordata
- Class: Chondrichthyes
- Subclass: Elasmobranchii
- Division: Selachii
- Order: Hexanchiformes
- Family: Hexanchidae
- Genus: Notorynchus
- Species: N. cepedianus

Binomial name
- Notorynchus cepedianus (Péron, 1807)
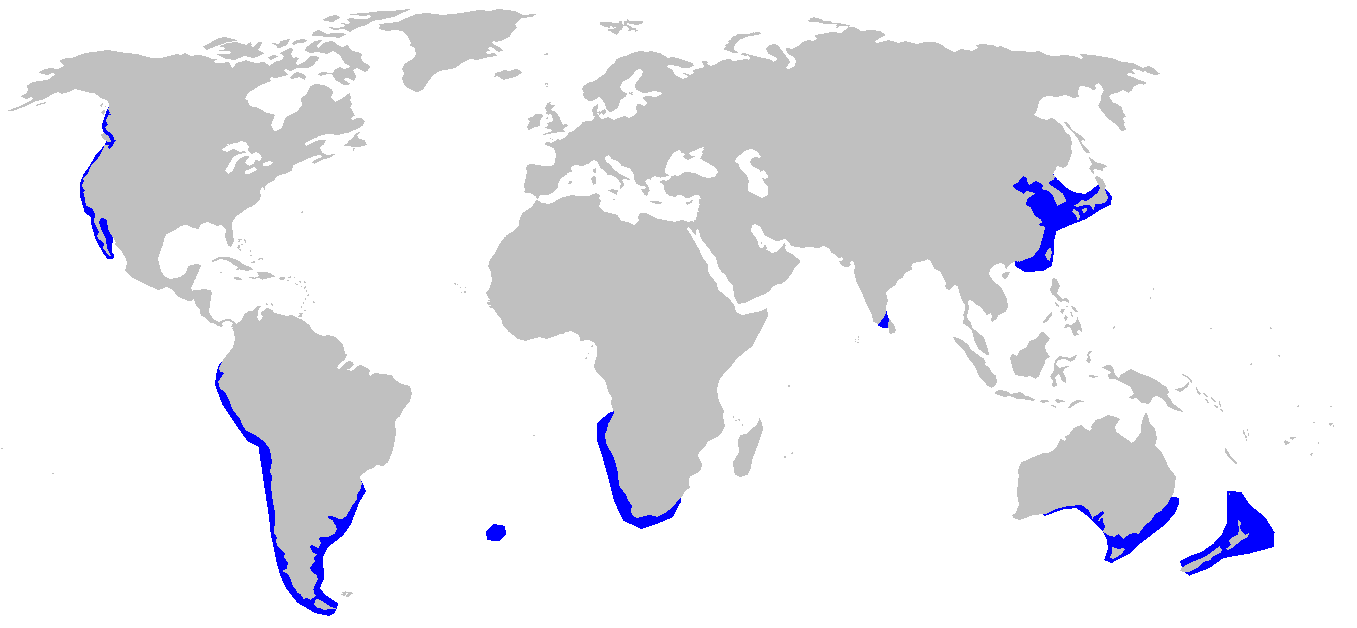
- Range of the broadnose sevengill shark

Synonyms
- Heptranchias haswelli Ogilby, 1897; Heptranchias pectorosus Garman, 1884; Heptranchias spilotus Lahille, 1913; Notidanus ferox Perez Canto, 1886; Notidanus indicus Agassiz, 1838; Notidanus medinae Philippi, 1902; Notidanus wolniczkyi Philippi, 1902; Notorynchus macdonaldi Whitley, 1931; Notorynchus maculatus Ayres, 1855; Notorhynchus borealis Gill, 1864; Notorhynchus ocellatus Devincenzi, 1920; Squalus cepedianus Péron, 1807; Squalus platycephalus Tenore, 1809

= Broadnose sevengill shark =

Species of shark

The broadnose sevengill shark (Notorynchus cepedianus) is the only extant member of the genus Notorynchus, in the family Hexanchidae. It is recognizable because of its seven gill slits, while most shark species have five gill slits, with the exception of the members of the order Hexanchiformes and the sixgill sawshark. This shark has a large, thick body, with a broad head and blunt snout. The top jaw has jagged, cusped teeth and the bottom jaw has comb-shaped teeth. Its single dorsal fin is set far back along the spine towards the caudal fin, and is behind the pelvic fins. In this shark the upper caudal fin is much longer than the lower, and is slightly notched near the tip. Like many sharks, this sevengill is counter-shaded. Its dorsal surface is silver-gray to brown in order to blend with the dark water and substrate when viewed from above. In counter to this, its ventral surface is very pale, blending with the sunlit water when viewed from below. The body and fins are covered in a scattering of small black & white spots. In juveniles, their fins often have white margins.

It is also known as sevengill shark or simply sevengill and was formerly known as cow shark and mud shark; it is called sevengill due to its seven gill slits. Because of this, it was listed along with the sharpnose sevengill shark (Heptranchias perlo) by Guinness World Records as having the most gill slits. It is similar to the sharpnose sevengill shark but the latter has a pointed snout and lacks spots on its dorsal surface. The sevengill species are also related to ancient sharks as fossils from the Jurassic Period (200 to 145 million years ago) also had seven gills. As recently as the 1930s and 1940s, the shark was targeted by fisheries along the coast of California and, once the commercial fishery receded, recreational fishing of the shark started in the 1980s and 1990s.

== Taxonomy ==
=== Name ===
The genus name Notorynchus a portmanteau is derived from the Ancient Greek νῶτον (nôton, meaning "back") prefixed to the Ancient Greek ῥῠ́γχος (rhúnkhos, meaning "snout"). It has been interpreted that this refers to the spots on the broadnose sevengill's dorsal. The specific epithet cepedianus is derived from a variation of the name Lacepede, which refers to Bernard Germain de Lacépède, a French naturalist during the late 18th and early 19th century. Altogether, the scientific name as a whole literally means "Lacepede's back snout".

The common name "broadnose sevengill shark" refers to the seven gill slits the species possesses and the shape of its snout. Sometimes, the name is shortened to "sevengill shark" or simply "sevengill". However, a variety of other common names are known in many languages. Other known common names in English include the bluntnose sevengill shark, broad-snout, cowshark, ground shark, seven-gill cowshark, seven-gilled shark, spotted cow shark, spotted seven-gill shark, and Tasmanian tiger shark. Common names from other languages include cação-bruxa (Portuguese), cañabota gata, gatita, tiburón de 7 gallas, tiburón pinto, and tollo fume (Spanish), ebisuzame and minami-ebisuzame (Japanese), gevlekte zevenkieuwshaai (Dutch), Kammzähner and Siebenkiemiger Pazifischer Kammzähner (German), koeihaai (Afrikaans), k'wet'thenéchte (Salish), platneus-sewekiefhaai (Afrikaans), platnez and requin malais (French), siedmioszpar plamisty (Polish), and tuatini (Maori).

== Description ==
The length at birth is 40–45 cm (15.5–17.5 in) while the mature male length is 1.5 m (4.9 ft) and mature female length is around 2.2 m (7.2 ft). The maximum length found is 3.0 metres (9.8 ft). The maximum recorded weight is 182 kg (401 lb) for a 2.91-metre (9.5 ft) individual. The shark is large and active and has a large head but small eyes and snout. The mouth is broad and prominent. The shark has one dorsal fin at the back of the body that spans from the insertion to the tops of the pelvic fins. The mottled grey and white body is covered in a variable number of small black spots.

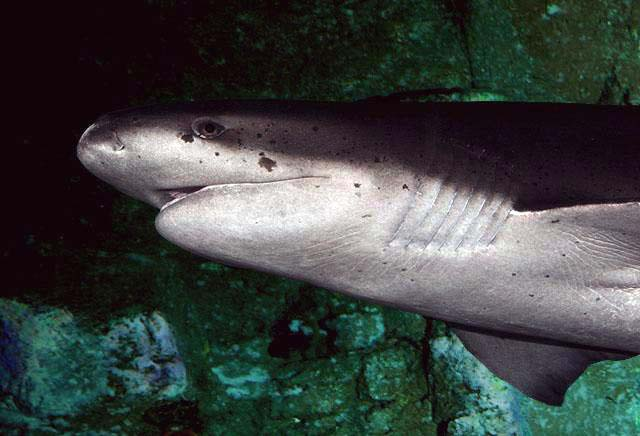
Front part including the seven gills

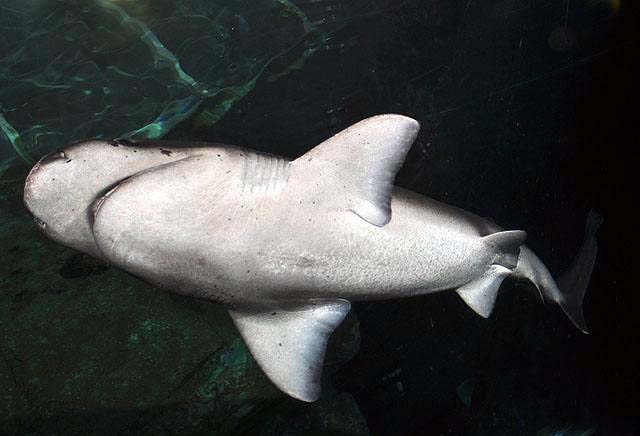
Bottom part

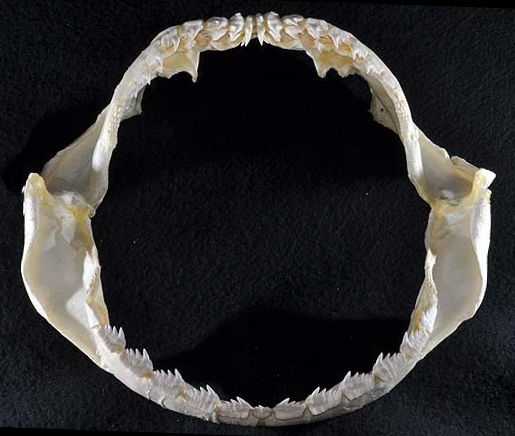
Jaws

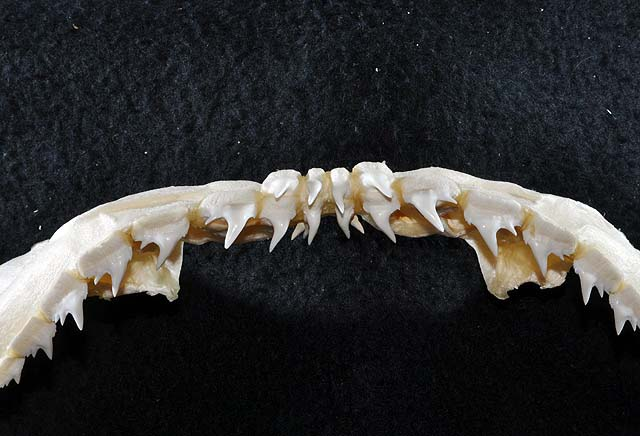
Upper teeth

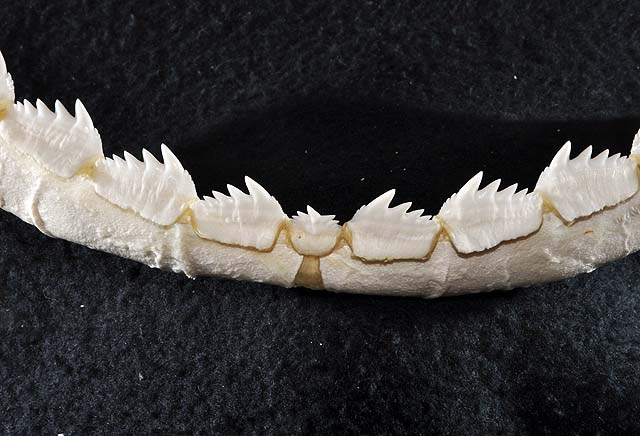
Lower teeth

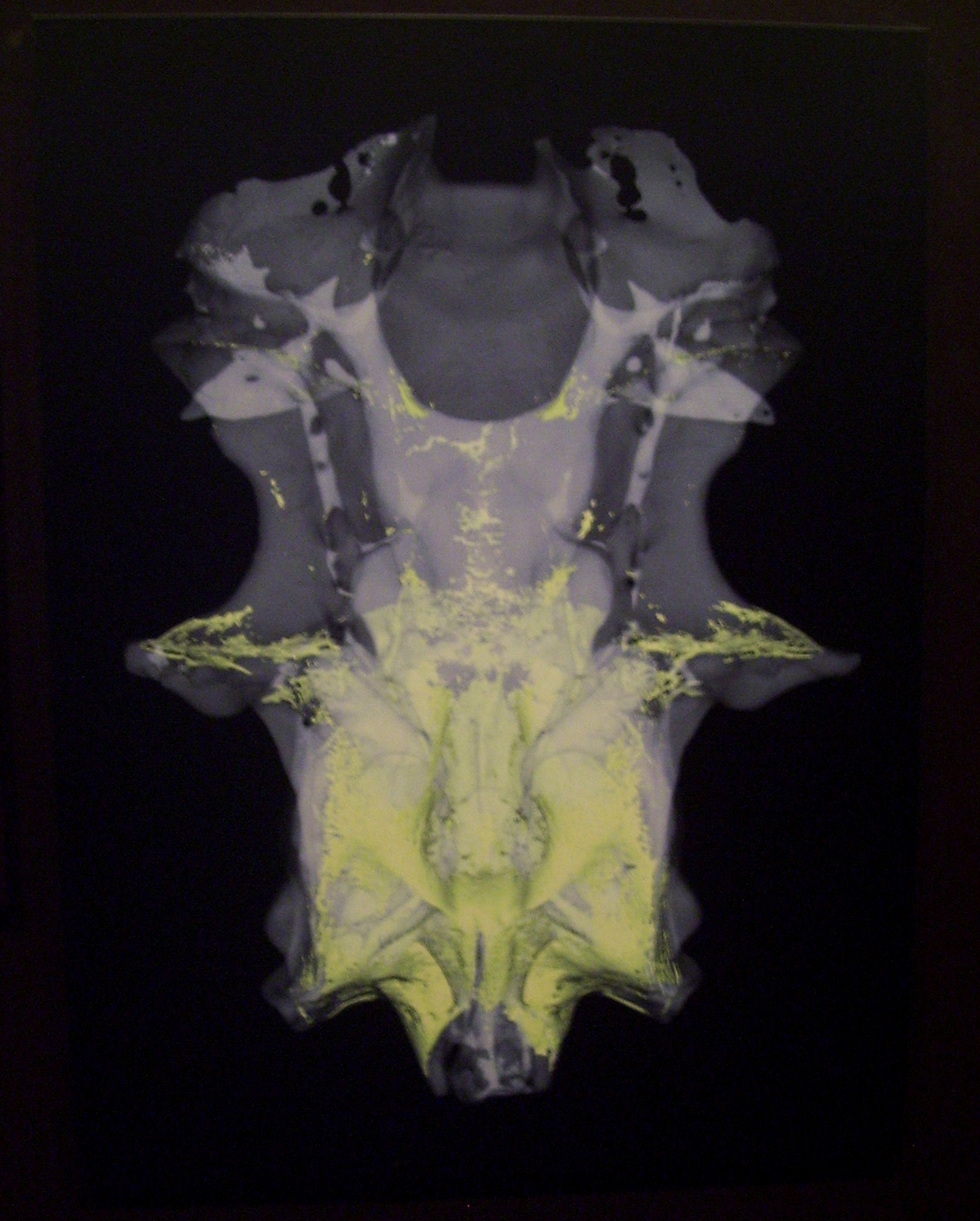
CT scan of the broadnose sevengill shark's braincase

== Range and habitat ==
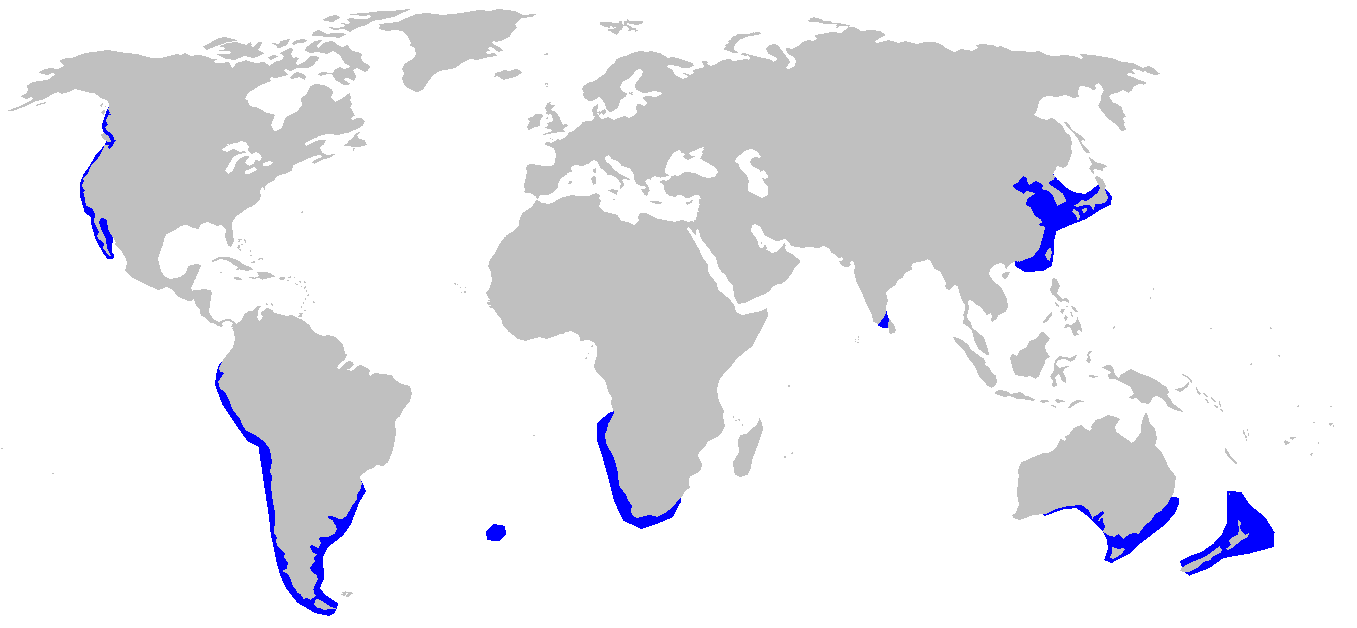
Range of the broadnose sevengill

The broadnose sevengill has so far been found in the western Pacific Ocean off China, Japan, Australia, New Zealand, the eastern Pacific Ocean off Canada, United States and Chile, and the southern Atlantic Ocean off Argentina and South Africa. It is significantly found in the San Francisco Bay particularly near the Golden Gate Bridge and Alcatraz Island. Large, old individuals tend to live in deep offshore environments as far down as 446 feet (136 m). However, most individuals live in either the deep channels of bays, or in the shallower waters of continental shelves and estuaries. These sharks are mainly benthic in nature, cruising along the sea floor and making an occasional foray to the surface. Individuals that live closer to the coast in South Africa tend to prefer more open areas with a sandy sea floor and sparse clumps of kelp.

== Behavior ==
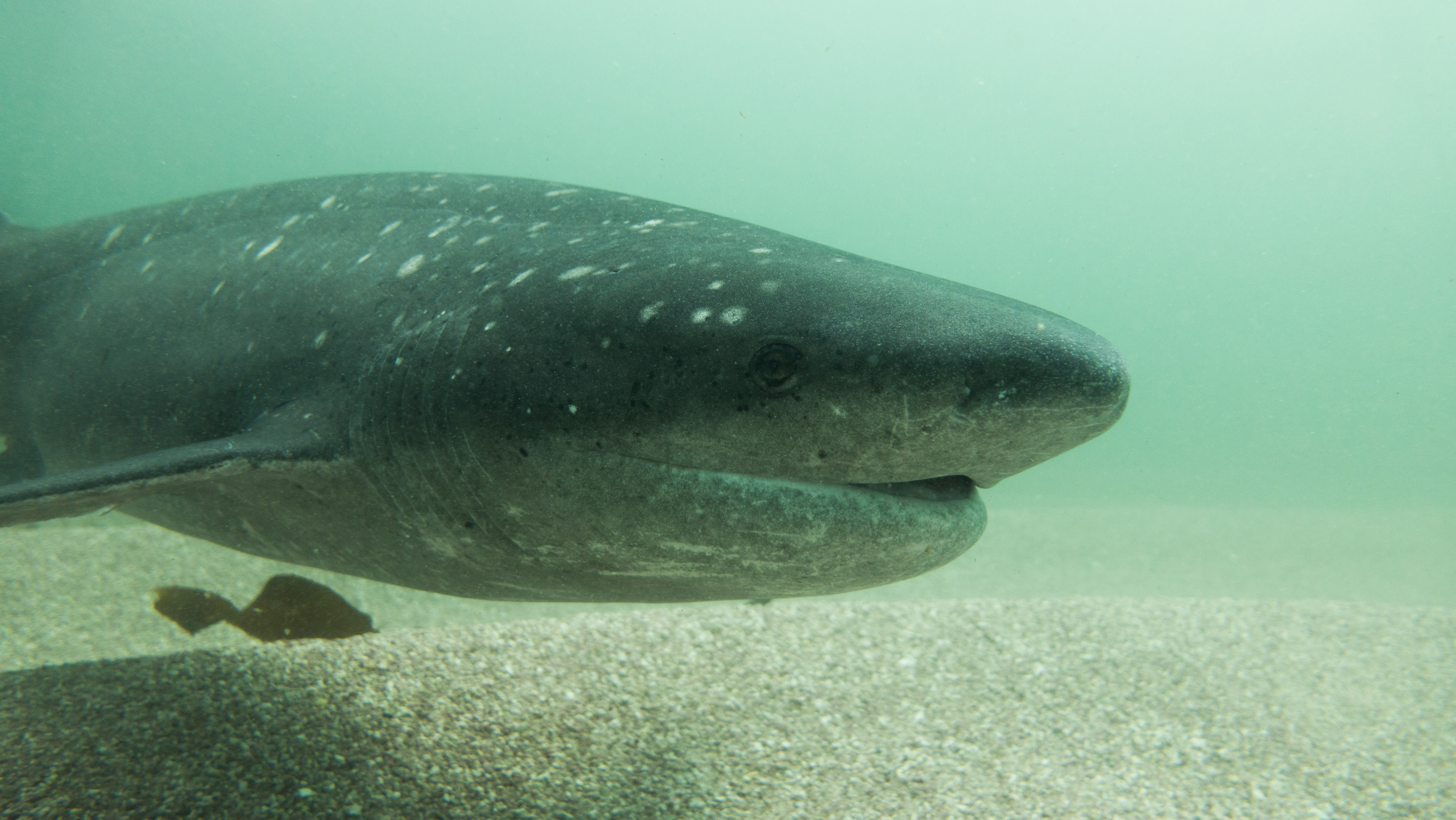
A broadnose sevengill shark in "Shark Alley", South Africa

An opportunistic predator, the broadnose sevengill preys on a great variety of animals, and has been found at depths of 1,870 feet (570 m), in offshore waters. It has been found to feed on other sharks (including the gummy shark, one of its main prey choices, and cowsharks), rays, chimaeras, cetaceans, pinnipeds, bony fishes and animal falls (seafloor carrion). It will also feed on anything that fits in its mouth, such as shark egg cases, sea snails, crustaceans and any remains of rats, seabirds, and even deceased drowned humans. Research in 2003 found that its diet consisted of 30% mammals, with a frequency of occurrence of 35%. It is a frequent top predator in shallow waters, and has comb-like teeth, with the upper teeth having slender, smooth edged cusps to swallow small enough prey whole and lower teeth that are broad enough to bite flesh into pieces. These sharks occasionally hunt in packs to take larger prey, using tactics such as stealth to succeed. After feeding, it slowly digests for several days, and can go weeks until eating again. Larger, predatory sharks (such as the great white shark) can be a threat, and cannibalism among this species has also been recorded. The species has also been observed being preyed upon by orcas in False Bay, South Africa. When not actively hunting, it patrols the water, stealthily, while making very little movement except for moving its caudal fin; when prey is detected, they conserve their energy until ready to make an accelerated dash to attack.

It can be one of the most abundant predators in coastal waters in summer; for example, in southeastern Tasmania, there is a high abundance of elasmobranchs (including the gummy shark) in coastal regions in summer. In New Zealand, it is also one of the most common inshore sharks. While it is mainly a nocturnal forager, it may opportunistically feed on prey casually found during the day; however, research in 2010 noted even amounts of activity during day and night. During this research, the shark was consistently detected at many depths, from bottom to near the surface, although it was mainly near the seafloor during the day. It also found that, as Norfolk Bay does not have adequate shelter cover, this species may use group formation to avoid predation.

The sevengill, like all other members of Hexanchiformes, is ovoviviparous. The broadnose sevengill lives for about 30 years, although the Washington State Department of Fish and Wildlife lists a maximum of 49 years, with the males maturing at 4 to 5 years and the female 11 to 21 years; the average reproductive age for a female is 20 to 25 years. After a 12-month gestation period, the female moves to a shallow bay or estuary to give birth between April and May to a large litter of between 82 and 95 pups, measuring 40–45 cm (15.5–17.5 in).

In 2004 and 2005, along with research for the sand tiger shark, there was research for the broadnose sevengill shark for development techniques for semen collection and artificial insemination to potentially increase breeding and lower overreliance on natural mating. Research in 2010 found that this shark has very poorly calcified vertebrae that cannot be used for age and growth estimations. Research in 2009 in Ría Deseado (RD) and Bahía San Julián (SJ), Argentina found that females were larger in RD than SJ and the heaviest female in RD was 70 kg while it was 36.9 kg in SJ. For the males, the heaviest in RD was 40 kg while it was 32.5 in SJ. Both locations also found the most significant to occur December and January.

Research in 2014 also found that for the first time, reproductive hormones levels were found in the broadnose sevengill shark. for a few years before venturing out. The probable predators of this species are larger sharks. Research from 2002 showed that although juvenile sevengill sharks utilize nursery areas in a similar way, males mature faster than females even if they are the same size and thus males are more likely to leave the nursery area before females.

In 2004, John G Maisey of the American Museum of Natural History published a detailed analysis of the broadnose sevengill shark including imagery such as CT scans and morphology of its braincase.

== Interactions with humans ==
The International Shark Attack File considers this shark to be potentially dangerous because of its proximity to humans, and because of its aggressive behavior when provoked. It has also been noted as being aggressive towards divers and spearfishermen in both public aquariums and the wild. One database shows 21 recorded incidents of this shark biting humans from 1890 to 2026, which no reported fatalities. New Zealand had the most reported bites.

In 2013, in Fiordland, New Zealand, a sevengill bit a diver's regulator and then her head.

In 2020 a 13 year old girl suffered a minor injury from a suspected broadnose sevengill shark while surfing at Oreti Beach in New Zealand. The girl felt no pain and continued to surf for an hour before realizing her leg was bleeding.

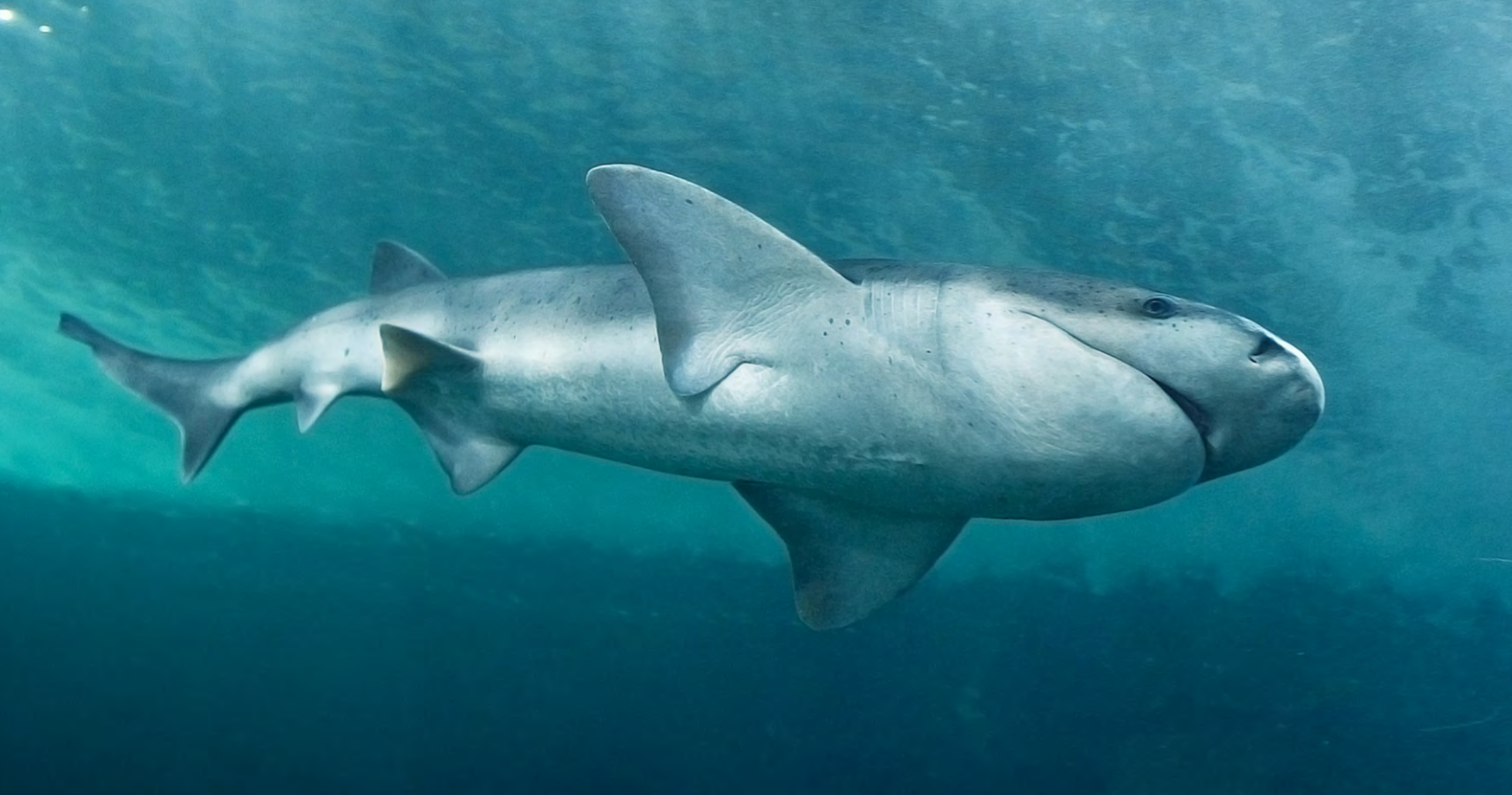
A broadnose sevengill shark in the Aquarium of the Bay

== Conservation status ==
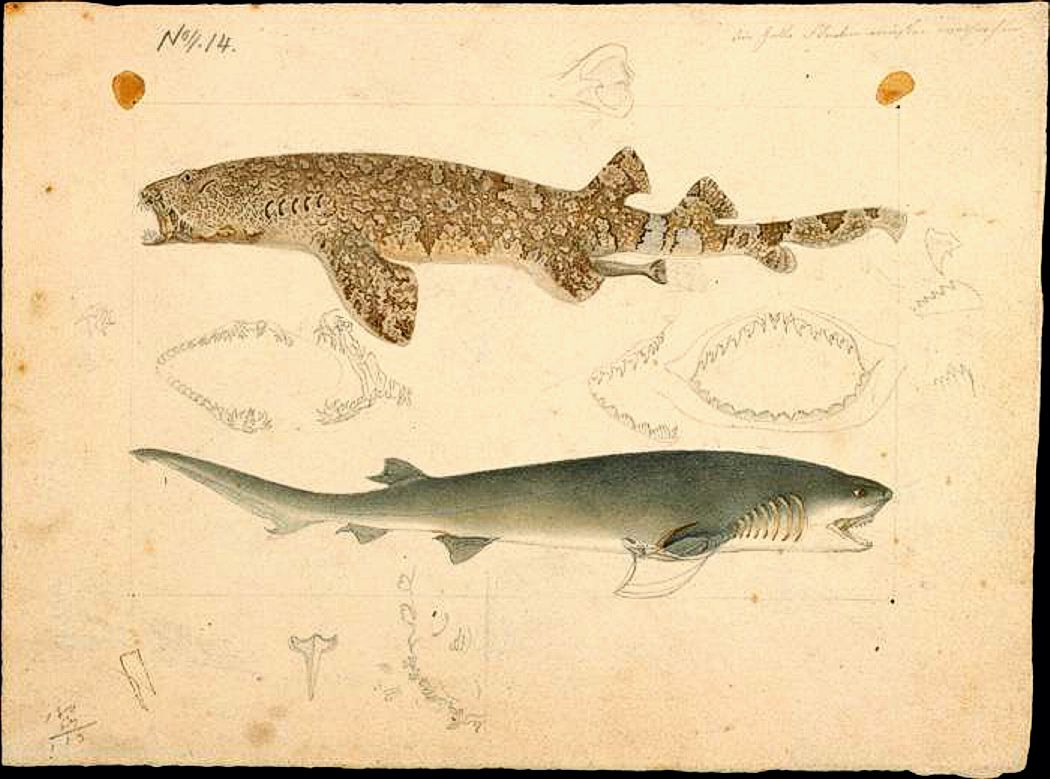
Painting by Frederick Schoenfeld

The broadnose sevengill is listed by the IUCN Red List as Vulnerable throughout its range. This species likely suffers great ongoing pressure from various types of fisheries, and from frequently being caught as bycatch. In Argentina, it's fished by rod and reel and broadnose sevengill shark fishing competitions have been occurring since the 1960s. It is also threatened by water pollution and is hunted for its liveroil and hide which is considered good quality in places such as China. In the early 1980s, intense fishing in the San Francisco Bay caused a local decline. In June 2018 the New Zealand Department of Conservation classified the broadnose sevengill shark as "Not Threatened" with the qualifiers "Data Poor" and "Secure Overseas" under the New Zealand Threat Classification System.

The broadnose sevengill is also a source of vitamin A and utilized by South African sport anglers for winter tournaments, however, this shark is not easy to land despite being readily hooked.

It is frequently seen by tourists and in temperate water aquariums and can adapt to captivity. One of the aquariums that houses the broadnose sevengill shark, Oregon Coast Aquarium in Newport, Oregon, has featured it as a "keynote species". There is also an app Sevengill Shark Tracking "Shark Observers" that allows divers to log sightings that are added to the Shark Observation Network, where the information supports "environmental awareness, assessment and policy making, and public participation at a global level".

Not many conservation measures are known but it has been recorded from one marine reserve in South Africa and it occurs in La Jolla Cove, La Jolla, San Diego, California with the latter having an apparent population increase in 2013. 2009 research also suggested that Bahía Anegada be made a conservation area given the high number of sharks there. In Washington state, recreational fishing of broadnose sevengill shark is closed on all state waters. In Victoria, Australia, the Department of Environment and Primary Industries sets a one bag limit and must be whole or in carcass form.
