= Hexanchus collinsonae =

Hexanchus collinsonae Temporal range: Eocene

Scientific classification
- Kingdom: Animalia
- Phylum: Chordata
- Class: Chondrichthyes
- Subclass: Elasmobranchii
- Division: Selachii
- Order: Hexanchiformes
- Family: Hexanchidae
- Genus: Hexanchus
- Species: H. collinsonae

Binomial name
- Hexanchus collinsonae Ward, 1979

Species of shark

Hexanchus collinsonae (named after M. E. Collinson) is a species of prehistoric shark that was found in the Eocene London Clay beds. It is a member of the family Hexanchidae.
