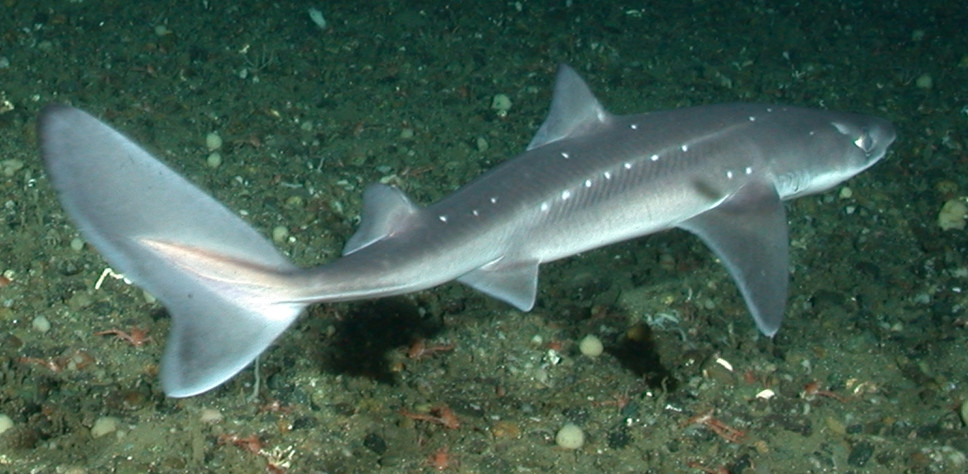
- Spiny dogfish

Scientific classification
- Kingdom: Animalia
- Phylum: Chordata
- Class: Chondrichthyes
- Subclass: Elasmobranchii
- Division: Selachii
- Superorder: Squalomorphi; Compagno, 1973

Series, orders and genera
- Hexanchida; Hexanchiformes; Squalida; Squaliformes; Squatinida; †Protospinaciformes; Echinorhiniformes; Squatiniformes; Pristiophoriformes; †Protospinax

= Squalomorphi =

Squalomorphi Temporal range: 170–Recent Ma

Superorder of sharks

Squalomorphi is a superorder of sharks, generally characterized by lacking traits such as an anal fin, nictitating membrane, or suborbital shelves in the cranium. Squalomorphs are also called squalea, or squaleans. There are about 163 living species in 11 families. Squalean sharks are divided into six orders: Echinorhiniformes, Hexanchiformes, Squaliformes, Squatiniformes, Pristiophoriformes and the extinct Protospinaciformes.

== Extant orders ==
=== Order Hexanchiformes ===
The order Hexanchiformes is a very small and primitive order consisting of cow sharks and frilled sharks. These sharks have only 1 dorsal fin, 6-7 gill slits, and no nictitating membrane on the eyes. Cow sharks are fairly large and stocky, while frilled sharks are smaller and have eel-like bodies. The oldest fossils from this order can be dated back to the mid-Jurassic.

There are six living species in 4 genera, and 2 families.

- Family Hexanchidae (Cow sharks)
- Family Chlamydoselachidae (Frilled sharks)

=== Order Squaliformes ===
The order Squaliformes is a large, ancient order of sharks. Sharks from this order have two dorsal fins -usually with spines-, no anal fin, and no nictitating membrane on the eyes. Squaliform sharks are extremely variable in size and shape, and can be found in most marine habitats throughout the world. Like Hexanchiformes, members of Squaliformes can be found as early as the Jurassic period.

There are around 120 species in 22 genera, and 6 families.

- Family Centrophoridae (Gulper sharks)
- Family Dalatiidae (Kitefin sharks)
- Family Etmopteridae (Lantern sharks)
- Family Oxynotidae (Rough sharks)
- Family Somniosidae (Sleeper sharks)
- Family Squalidae (Dogfish sharks)

=== Order Echinorhiniformes ===
- Family Echinorhinidae (bramble sharks)

=== Order Squatiniformes ===
The order Squatiniformes is a small order of highly specialized and recognizable sharks called angel sharks. The angel sharks have flattened bodies and broad pectoral fins, as well as camouflaged coloration. These characteristics allow angel sharks to blend in with their benthic environments. Members of Squatiniformes have been found since the late Jurassic period.

There are 23 species in 1 genus, and 1 family.

- Family Squatinidae (Angel sharks)

=== Order Pristiophoriformes ===
The order Pristiophoriformes is a small order of unique sharks called sawsharks. Sawsharks have a long snout covered in teeth, between 5-6 gill slits, and no anal fin. They also have a pair of barbels usually located halfway down the snout. Sawsharks are frequently confused with sawfish, which are members of the ray order Pristiformes. Sawsharks can be discerned from sawfish thanks to their lateral gill slits, which differ from the sawfish's ventral gill slits. These sharks can mostly be found in deep benthic environments. Fossils of members of this order have been found since the late Jurassic period.

There are 8 species in 2 genera, and 1 family.

- Family Pristiophoridae (Saw sharks)
