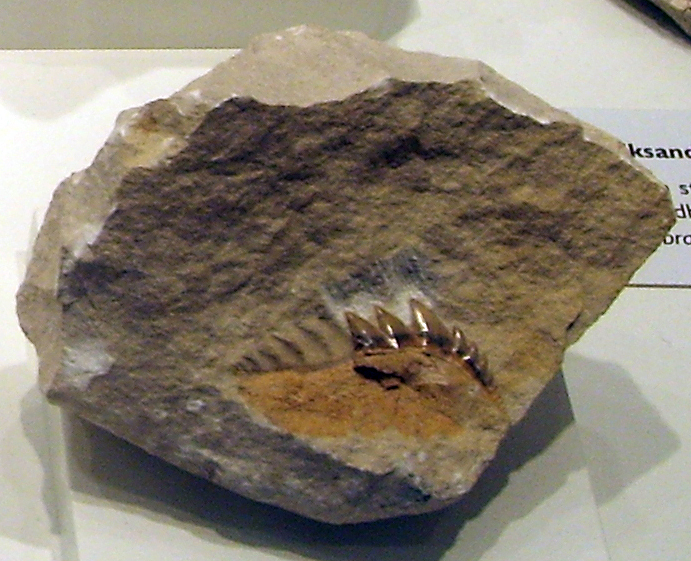
- Fossil of an anterolateral lower tooth, probably from Xampylodon loozi

Scientific classification
- Kingdom: Animalia
- Phylum: Chordata
- Class: Chondrichthyes
- Subclass: Elasmobranchii
- Division: Selachii
- Order: Hexanchiformes
- Family: Hexanchidae
- Genus: †Xampylodon; Cappetta, Morrison & Adnet, 2021

Species
- see text

= Xampylodon =

Xampylodon Temporal range: Valanginian–Thanetian

Extinct genus of cow shark

Xampylodon is an extinct genus of cow shark. Fossils assigned to this genus are known from the Late Cretaceous and early Paleocene. Xampylodon was erected in 2021 after a revision on the taxonomy of hexanchid fossil teeth, and includes four species (X. dentatus, X. loozi,X. brotzeni, and X. diastemacron), most of them previously included in Notidanodon.

== Morphology ==
Xampylodon is known exclusively from isolated teeth. These teeth have a unique morphology (especially the saw-like teeth from the lower jaw). Xampylodon teeth are characterized by having an acrocone (or main cusp) and cusplets bent distally, with a convex mesial cutting edge. The mesial cusplets are much smaller than the distal ones. The root is very deep, unlike the condition observed in Notidanodon. Xampylodon species differ from each other in aspects such as size, the number and shape of the mesial cusplets, the orientation of the acrocone, and the presence of a gap between cusplets.

== Species ==
- Xampylodon brotzeni (Siverson 1995)
- Xampylodon dentatus (Woodward 1886)
- Xampylodon diastemacron Santos et al. 2024
- Xampylodon loozi (Vincent 1876)
