= Atlantic sixgill shark =

Conservation status
- Least Concern (IUCN 3.1)

Scientific classification
- Kingdom: Animalia
- Phylum: Chordata
- Class: Chondrichthyes
- Subclass: Elasmobranchii
- Division: Selachii
- Order: Hexanchiformes
- Family: Hexanchidae
- Genus: Hexanchus
- Species: H. vitulus

Binomial name
- Hexanchus vitulus Springer and Waller, 1969
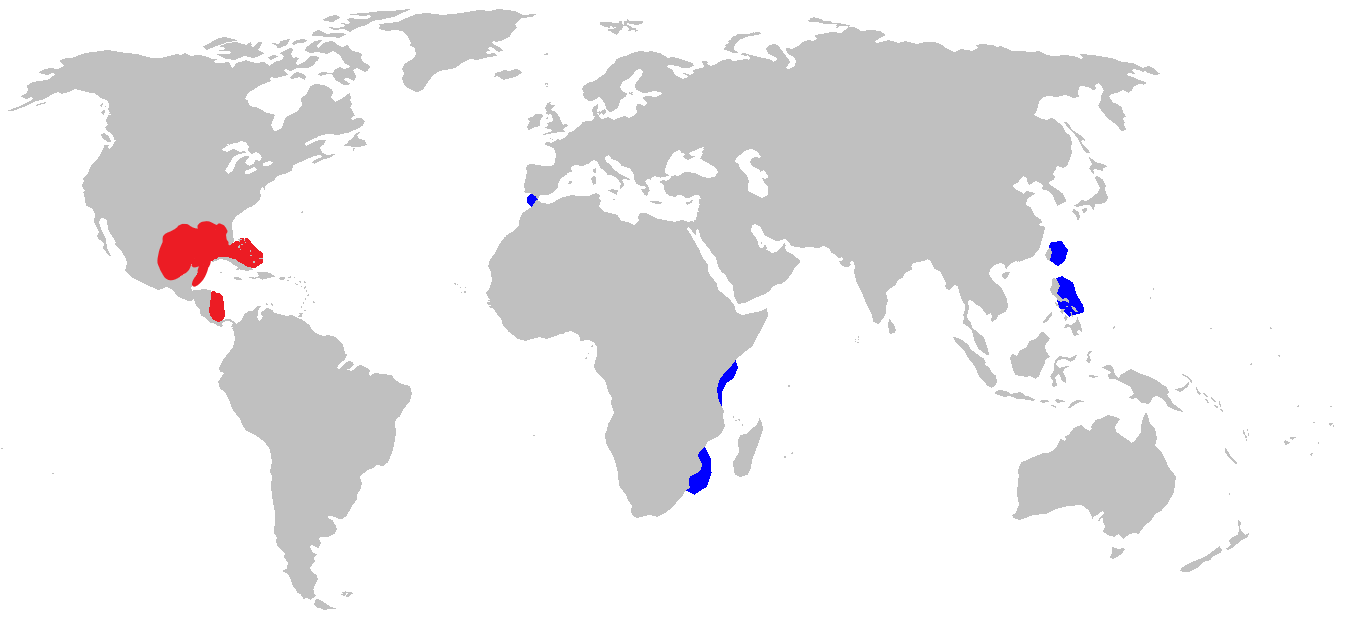
- Distribution of Hexanchus vitulus (red) and Hexanchus nakamurai (blue)

Species of shark

The Atlantic sixgill shark (Hexanchus vitulus) is one of the five extant species of the Hexanchidae family of cow sharks. They are found in the Atlantic Ocean at depths that are greater than 300 meters. Due to their habitat being difficult to access for humans, they are rarely encountered and hard to study. The Atlantic sixgill shark is very similar to other species of cow shark in terms of its morphology and growth rate in deep sea waters. It is believed that this is due to the abiotic and biotic factors in relation to the depths at which they are found. It was first described as its own species in 1969, but was later synonymized with the morphologically similar bigeye sixgill shark (Hexanchus nakamurai). However, a study published in 2018 resurrected the species on the basis of molecular data.

== Description ==
The Atlantic sixgill shark is a fairly slender, medium sized shark. Females are typically larger than males, with females growing to between 142-178 cm (4.66 ft-5.84 ft) and males growing to 123-157 cm (4.04-5.15 ft). It has a brownish dorsal coloration and a white ventral coloration. As its name suggests, it has six gill slits which get smaller as they move towards the posterior of the shark. It has large eyes relative to its body and its head is narrow and pointed. It has a singular dorsal fin located near the posterior end of its body, and the upper lobe of the caudal fin is significantly longer than the lower lobe. Relative to its body length, the pectoral fins are short and wide, and the pelvic fins are long. The teeth of the upper and lower jaw are different in shape. Both sides of the upper jaw have nine large, pointed teeth with about nine smaller teeth following. The shark has a singular, symmetrical tooth in the middle of the lower jaw with five rows of large, trapezoidal, and serrated teeth with five much smaller teeth following them on both sides of the lower jaw.

The Atlantic sixgill shark's extreme morphological similarity to the bigeyed sixgill shark makes the two species nearly impossible to discern through external traits. The lack of morphological differences led to the two species being merged in 1991, with Hexanchus nakamurai becoming the accepted name. However, based on genetic analysis study from 2018, the two species were discovered to be as genetically distinct from each other as they were from the other extant shark in its genus, the bluntnose sixgill shark (Hexanchus griseus), reviving Hexanchus vitulus as a species. The Atlantic sixgill shark can also be confused as juveniles or small specimens of the bluntnose sixgill shark. Compared to the Atlantic sixgill shark, the bluntnose sixgill shark grows to significantly larger sizes and has smaller eyes proportional to body size. However, identifying using these methods can be difficult. One distinguishing feature between these sharks is that the bluntnose sixgill sharks have six rows of large, trapezoidal, and serrated teeth instead of the five that Atlantic sixgill sharks have.

== Distribution ==
The Atlantic sixgill shark inhabits tropical waters across the Gulf of Mexico and the Caribbean Sea in the Atlantic Ocean. They are found from the surface to as deep as 700 meters, but are typically bathydemersal, meaning they live 200 meters or below the surface of the water, where they tend to live on the continental shelves and slopes.

== Life History ==
Information about the life history of Atlantic sixgill sharks is sparse. They are viviparous with young being live at birth, and there are between 13 and 26 young per litter. The size of these pups is between 40-45 cm (15.7-17.7 in). Research has shown that Atlantic sixgill sharks may stratify through the water column and geographically based on size and age. One study caught mostly adults around 640 m in the Bahamas, and another study only caught juveniles at depths of less than 350 m near Belize and the Gulf of Mexico. Conversely, a study off the coast of Guatemala used similar depth and methods of capture as to the study in Belize and Gulf of Mexico, but they caught mostly mature specimens. This may reflect differentiated nursing sites and feeding zones for Atlantic sixgill sharks.

The Atlantic sixgill shark feeds mostly on bony fish and cephalopods, with crustaceans being occasionally included in their diet.

The rectal gland of the Atlantic sixgill shark has a lobulate shape and higher concentrations of urea, a trait which it shares with only the rest of its family of Hexanchidae and family Echinorhinidae. This may reflect a more ancestral form of the rectal gland in sharks as the order Hexanchiformes, which Hexanchidae is under, is thought to have diverged from the rest of the Squalomorphi, a superorder of sharks, first among the extant orders.

== Conservation Status ==
The Atlantic sixgill shark is currently listed as least concern by the International Union for the Conservation of Nature as of 2025. They are caught in relatively low numbers as bycatch through deep-sea fisheries. While they are commonly caught alive and often released after being caught, their post-release survivability is uncertain, and other deep-sea sharks show notable post-release mortality rates. Due to its fatty and soft meat, it is supposedly not of commercial value to fisherman. With the low number of studies for this shark and its elusive nature, information about the actual abundance and stability of its population is extremely limited. However, due to fishing activity within its usual habitat being low, it is assumed that the population of Atlantic sixgill sharks is stable.

There are no specific conservation efforts for the Atlantic sixgill shark, but the Final Fishery Management Plan for Atlantic Tunas, Swordfish, and Sharks released by the National Oceanic and Atmospheric Administration in 1999 declared Hexanchus vitulus as a prohibited species. This makes the shark prohibited from landing, meaning that it cannot be brought back to shore and basically must be discarded as bycatch. However, this document has not been updated to recognize the reclassification of the Atlantic sixgill shark as a distinct species and still lists it as the bigeye sixgill shark.
