= Gladioserratus =

Gladioserratus Temporal range: Valanginian–Danian Possible Ypresian record

Scientific classification
- Domain: Eukaryota
- Kingdom: Animalia
- Phylum: Chordata
- Class: Chondrichthyes
- Subclass: Elasmobranchii
- Division: Selachii
- Order: Hexanchiformes
- Family: Hexanchidae
- Genus: †Gladioserratus; Underwood et al., 2011

Extinct genus of sharks

Gladioserratus is an extinct genus of cow shark. It contains three species:

- Gladioserratus aptiensis Pictet, 1865
- Gladioserratus magnus Underwood, Goswami, Prasad, Verma & Flynn, 2011
- Gladioserratus dentatus Guinot, Cappetta & Adnet, 2014

The authors of its description considered it to be an exclusively Cretaceous genus, containing species living from Hauterivian to Cenomanian. Subsequently the species G. dentatus was described from the Valanginian of France. Teeth described by Adolfssen and Ward (2015), collected from the middle Danian Faxe Formation at Faxe, Denmark, extend the temporal range of the genus to Paleocene; according to the authors, the species "Notorynchus" serratissimus Agassiz (1843) should probably be assigned to the genus Gladioserratus as well, which, if confirmed, would further extended the temporal range of the genus to the early Eocene.
