= Welcommia =

Welcommia Temporal range: 183–175.6 Ma Jurassic

Scientific classification
- Domain: Eukaryota
- Kingdom: Animalia
- Phylum: Chordata
- Class: Chondrichthyes
- Subclass: Elasmobranchii
- Division: Selachii
- Order: Hexanchiformes
- Family: †Pseudonotidanidae
- Genus: †Welcommia; Klug & Kriwet, 2010

Extinct genus of sharks

Welcommia is an extinct genus of shark. It contains only three species :-

- †Welcommia bodeuri H. Cappetta, 1990 (Late Jurassic of France)
- †Welcommia cappettai Stefanie Klug and Jürgen Kriwet, 2010 (middle Oxfordian of Germany)
- †Welcommia terencei D. Delsate and P. Godefroit, 1995 (Jurassic of Belgium)
