= Henri Cappetta =

French paleoichthyologist (1946–2024)

Henri Cappetta (August 29, 1946 – January 6, 2024) was a French ichthyologist specializing in the paleontology of sharks and rays. He was a managing director at the Institut des Sciences de l'Evolution in the University of Montpellier.
