= William Orville Ayres =

American physician (1817–1887)

- Born: September 11, 1817; New Canaan, Connecticut
- Died: 30 April 1887 (aged 69); Brooklyn, New York
- Education: Yale
- Spouse: Maria J. Hildreth
- Children: 2 daughters
- Parents: Jared Ayres (father); Dinah (Benedict) Ayres (mother)
- Scientific career
- Fields: Ornithology, Ichthyologist
- Workplaces: San Francisco, Chicago, New Haven

William Orville Ayres (September 11, 1817 – April 30, 1887) was an American medical doctor and ichthyologist. Born in Connecticut, he studied to become a medical doctor at Yale University School of Medicine.

== Life and career ==
Ayers, the son of Jared and Dinah (Benedict) Ayres, was born in New Canaan, Conn, September 11, 1817. He graduated from Yale College in 1837. For fifteen years after graduation he was employed as a teacher as follows in Berlin, Conn. (1837–38), Miller's Place, L. I. (1838–41), East Hartford, Conn. (1842–44), Sag Harbor, L. I. (1844–47), and Boston, Mass (1845–52). He began the study of medicine in Boston, and in 1854 received the degree of M.D. from Yale College. He then moved to San Francisco, Cal., where he remained for nearly twenty years, engaged in practice. He also served as Professor of the Theory and Practice of Medicine in the Toland Medical College in that city. He removed to Chicago shortly before the great fire of 1871, in which he suffered considerable pecuniary loss. About 1878 he returned to New Haven, and opened an office for the practice of his profession. From 1879 he also held an appointment as Lecturer on Diseases of the Nervous System in the Yale Medical School.

He removed his residence, early in 1887, to Brooklyn, N. Y., his health having already begun to fail; and he died in Brooklyn, on the 30th of April, in his 70th year. He married, November 23, 1847, Maria J. Hildreth, of Sag Harbor, L. I, who survived him, with one of their two daughters. Besides his specialty of nervous diseases, Dr Ayers had made notable acquisitions in certain departments of natural science, especially in ichthyology, on which he had published a large number of memoirs, in the Proceedings of the Boston Society of Natural History and of the California Academy of Sciences. While in San Francisco he was a deacon in the First Congregational Church.

This section incorporates public domain material from the 1887 Yale Obituary Record .

== Ornithology ==
Ayres was also interested in natural science, however, particularly in ornithology. He became friends with famed ornithologist and painter John James Audubon, who named a woodpecker (now called the northern flicker) after him, mentioning him by name in his Birds of America:

I have named this handsome bird after my young and learned friend W. O. AYRES, Esq., who is well known to science as an excellent ichthyologist; and who also is well conversant with the birds of our country.

As the first Curator of Ichthyology of the California Academy of Sciences, Ayres wrote several many papers on the fish of California, despite poor facilities. In a letter to a colleague at the Smithsonian Institution Ayers pleaded for support for the fledgling academy:

I am working along here in the dark as well as I can, with almost nothing in the way of books or means of reference, and what mistakes I make, some of you more advantageously situated must correct.

Since there were no established scientific journals available, he turned to local newspapers to publish his descriptions of fish.

In 1882 Ayres wrote an article in The American Naturalist, "The Ancient Man of Calaveras" about the Calaveras Skull, a human skull purported at the time to have been found in a mine in Calaveras County, California. He defended the claim that the skull was indeed of ancient origin. That the skull was of ancient provenance is now generally believed to have been a hoax.

Ayres's name (cited in Latin as ayresii) is used in the binomial names of several species of birds and fish.

== See also ==
- Category:Taxa named by William Orville Ayres
