= Pierre Joseph Bonnaterre =

French naturalist (1752–1804)

Abbé Pierre Joseph Bonnaterre (1752, Aveyron – 20 September 1804, Saint-Geniez-d'Olt) was a French zoologist who contributed sections on cetaceans, mammals, birds, reptiles, amphibians, fish, and insects to the Tableau encyclopédique et méthodique. He is also notable as the first scientist to study the feral child Victor of Aveyron.

Bonnaterre is credited with identifying about 25 new species of fish, and assembled illustrations of about 400 in his encyclopedia work.

He was the first scientist to study Victor, the wild child of Aveyron, whose life inspired François Truffaut for his film The Wild Child.

== Partial bibliography ==
- Tableau encyclopédique et méthodique des trois règnes de la nature, dix-huitième partie, insectes. Agasse, Paris 1797.
- Recueil de médecine vétérinaire ou Collection de mémoires d'instructions et de recettes sur les maladies des animaux domestiques.
- Tableau encyclopédique et méthodique des trois règnes de la nature ..., cétologie, ophiologie, erpétologie. Padoue 1795.
- Tableau encyclopédique et méthodique des trois règnes de la nature, Ophiologie. Panckoucke, Paris 1790.
- Tableau encyclopédique et méthodique des trois règnes de la nature, ornithologie. Panckoucke, Paris 1790/91.
- Tableau encyclopédique et méthodique des trois règnes de la nature ... Cétologie. Panckoucke, Paris 1789.
- Tableau encyclopédique et méthodique des trois règnes de la nature ..., Erpétologie. Panckoucke, Paris 1789/90.
- Tableau encyclopédique et méthodique des trois règnes de la nature ..., Ichthyologie. Panckoucke, Paris 1788.

== See also ==
- Category:Taxa named by Pierre Joseph Bonnaterre
