= Enchoteuthis =

Enchoteuthis Temporal range: Albian–Campanian
- Life restoration of E. melanae

Scientific classification
- Kingdom: Animalia
- Phylum: Mollusca
- Class: Cephalopoda
- Order: Octopoda
- Family: †Muensterellidae
- Genus: †Enchoteuthis; Miller & Walker, 1968

Type species
- †Enchoteuthis melanae Miller & Walker, 1968

Other species
- †E. tonii (Wade, 1993); †E. cobbani (Larson, 2010)

Synonyms
- Kansasteuthis lindneri Miller & Walker, 1968; Niobrarateuthis walkeri Green, 1977; Muensterella tonii Wade, 1993; Tusoteuthis cobbani Larson, 2010

Genus of Cretaceous cephalopods

Enchoteuthis (meaning "spear squid") is an extinct genus of large enchoteuthine cephalopod that lived during the Cretaceous. Although it and its relative Tusoteuthis are often compared to squid, both are now thought to be more closely related to modern octopuses. Examination of gladius remains initially yielded an estimated mantle length of about 2 m (6 ft 7 in) based on one specimen once described as Tusoteuthis longa, which is close to or equal to that of the modern giant squid, although reclassification of this genus as a muensterelloid results in a longer total length, about 3 m (10 ft). Three species are currently recognized as valid: E. melanae, E. tonii, and E. cobbani.

== Etymology ==
The generic name Enchoteuthis is derived from the Greek enchos ("spear") and teuthis ("squid"). The specific name melanae honors Melanie Bonner, who discovered the holotype. E. cobbani is named after William Cobban.

== Distribution ==
Reconstructions of the holotype and largest specimens based on Muensterella and Dosidicus

E. melanae and E. cobbani are both known from the Late Cretaceous Western Interior Seaway of North America, with specimens found in Kansas, Wyoming, South Dakota, North Dakota, and Manitoba. E. tonii is known from the Early Cretaceous Eromanga Seaway of Australia. An additional unnamed species is known from the Late Cretaceous Paleo-Pacific Ocean of North America, specifically British Columbia and Alaska.

== Taxonomy and Phylogeny ==
In analysis of Enchoteuthis and related fossil coleoid cephalopods, Larson erected the family Enchoteuthididae for Enchoteuthis, Tusoteuthis, Niobrarateuthis and Kansasteuthis. However Kansasteuthis has since been deemed a subjective junior synonym of Enchoteuthis while Tusoteuthis is considered a nomen dubium.

Muensterelloids have traditionally been identified as being closely related to teudopseids, a clade that includes the majority of known gladius-bearing Mesozoic cephalopods. In 1990 Engeser for the first time considered the relationship of the Muensterelloidea to the Octopoda, which includes all modern cirrate and incirrate octopus. Fuchs et al. (2020) found Muensterelloids to be sister taxa to the Palaeololiginidae. The very same analysis finds Muensterelloids, which have never been found to be paraphyletic, to consist of two main clades, the Patelloctopodidae and the ‘Muensterella–Enchoteuthidae clade’. The unusual morphology of the gladius in Patelloctopus ilgi links the morphology seen in teudopseids like Muensterella and crown cirrates and incirrates. It is possible that the patelloctopodid clade includes the last common ancestor of cirrate and incirrate octopods, whereas the "Muensterella-Enchoteuthidae" clade likely became extinct during the Late Cretaceous. Presumably, these two clades split in the middle-late Toarcian, which would make it congruent with the minimum divergence date calculated by Tanner et al. (2017) using molecular clock analysis.

The results of the 2020 analysis show Enchoteuthis as the most derived member of the "Muensterella-Enchoteuthidae" clade:

- Vampyromorphida
  - - Teudopsis acuta
    - - Palaeololigo albersdoerferi
      - Muensterelloidea
        - Celaenoteuthis incerta
        - - Engeseriteuthis arcuatus
          - - - Listroteuthis conica
              - - Muensterella scutellaris
                - - Muensterella spinosa
                  - - Muensterella jillae
                    - - Muensterella sp.
                      - Enchoteuthidae
                        - Niobrarateuthis bonneri
                        - - Enchoteuthis melanae
                          - - Enchoteuthis cobbani
                            - Enchoteuthis tonii
            - - Tyrionella fauseri
              - - Etchesia martilli
                - - Muensterellina johnjagti
                  - - Patelloctopodidae
                      - Pearceiteuthis buyi
                      - Patelloctopus ilgi
                    - Palaeoctopodidae (Relationship with Patelloctopodidae is assumed only)
                      - - Keuppia hyperbolaris
                        - Keuppia levante
                      - Palaeoctopus newboldi
                      - Styletoctopus annae

== See also ==
- Tusoteuthis
- Muensterella
- Cephalopod size
