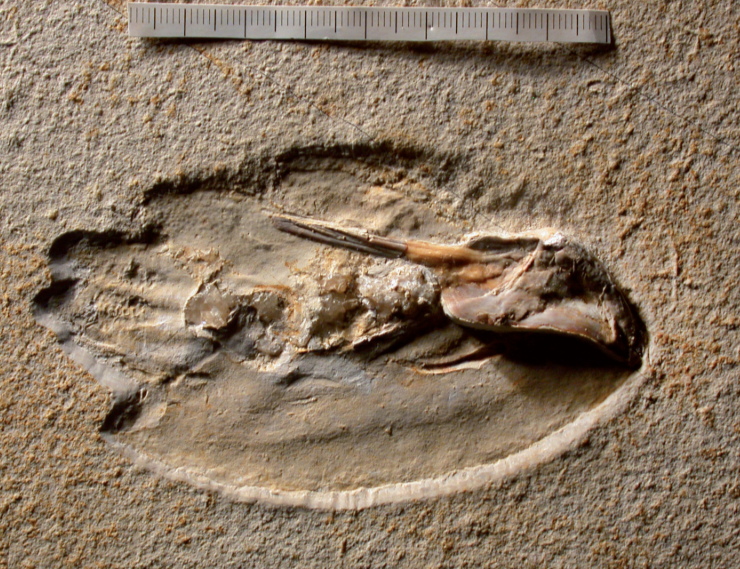
- Fossil specimen BSPG MC-21 of Muensterella scutellaris

Scientific classification
- Kingdom: Animalia
- Phylum: Mollusca
- Class: Cephalopoda
- Order: Octopoda
- Family: †Muensterellidae
- Genus: †Muensterella; Schevill, 1950

Type species
- Muensterella scutellaris Münster, 1842

Species
- Muensterella scutellaris Münster, 1842; Muensterella spinosa Fuchs et al., 2019; Muensterella jillae Fuchs et al., 2019

Synonyms
- Kelaeno Münster, 1842 (preoccupied)

= Muensterella =

Muensterella Temporal range: Kimmeridgian-Turonian ~155–90 Ma

Extinct genus of molluscs

Muensterella (IPA: [ˈmʏns.tɐ.ɛl.la]) (meaning "Münster's small one") is an extinct genus of small muensterellid cephalopod, which superficially resembles cuttlefish or bobtail squid but are actually more closely related to octopus. Fossils of this genus have primarily been found in the Upper Jurassic lithographic limestones of Southern Germany, and additional material is known from the Tithonian of Antarctica and the Upper Cretaceous of Germany and Texas.

== History ==
The fossil that would later be known as Muensterella scutellaris was first described by the German palaeontologist Georg Graf zu Münster in 1842 based on the fossil material from the Solnhofen lithographic limestones in Bavaria as Kelaeno arquata. However, the genus Kelaeno as named by Münster is a younger homonym of Kelaeno named by d’Orbigny in 1841. Therefore, Kelaeno Münster, 1843, and the family name Kelaenidae Naef, 1921, had to be replaced by younger synonyms, which are Muensterella, as described by Schevill in 1950, and Muensterellidae Roger, 1952.

Previously it had been erroneously assumed that the holotype, later designated as MfN MB.c.1023, had been destroyed in WW2 during the RAF bombing raid on the Paleontological Museum in Munich. Later research by Fuchs et al. in 2003 illustrated what they thought was the counterpart of the holotype, which they found in the Museum of Natural History Berlin. Subsequently, said specimen was proven to in fact be the holotype itself; the error was caused by the fact that the original drawings published by Münster back in 1842 were mirrored, making the actual holotype appear to be its counterpart.

In 2019 a comprehensive paper on the evolution and phylogeny of the Muensterelloidea by Fuchs et al. named two further species of Muensterella: M. spinosa from the Tithonian of Daiting, Mörnsheim Formation in Bavaria, and M. jillae from the middle Turonian South Bosque Formation of Texas.

== Description ==
Most fossil cephalopods are primarily known from the remains of their hard parts, usually the gladius, a mostly thin, flexible internal shell that provides structural support and helps maintain the body shape, or the beak. Specimens of Muensterella are usually preserved in a lateral position; dorsal or ventral views which would better preserve the detailed anatomy of the gladius are rarer. Several very well-preserved specimens of M. scutellaris from the Solnhofen Limestone offer a detailed insight into the soft tissue anatomy of this genus.

=== Gladius ===
In muensterelloids such as Muensterella, the gladius can be subdivided into an anterior free median field (or rachis) and a posterior patella. In M. scutellaris the patella is shaped like a long oval; its apex is located in its anterior half. The margins of the patella as well as its dorsal surface are smooth and lack tubercles or radial ribs. The slender and moderately wide median field expresses itself as a keel-like elevation above the depressed hyperbolar zone, which is the part of the rachis enclosed by the patella. The free rachis is slightly shorter than the patella. M. spinosa is very similar in its morphology to M. scutellaris, but its gladius exhibits spine-like structures on its dorsal surface as well as faint ribs radiating from the apex of the patella, a trait unique amongst other muensterelloids. M. jillae is also very similar in its gladius shape to the type species, but the apex of its conus is more posterior, and the species is far larger as a whole.

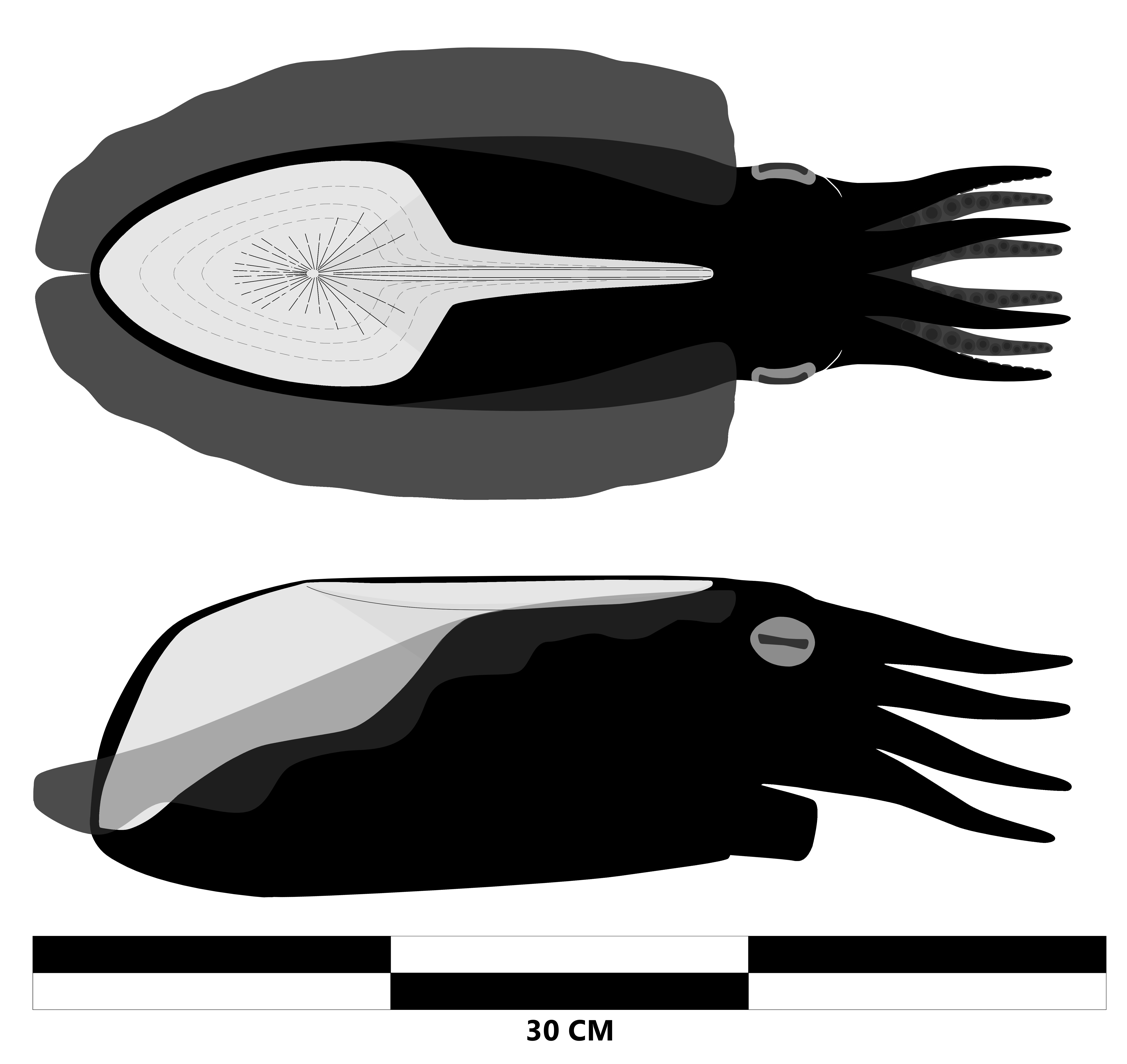
Muensterella scutellaris diagram depicting soft tissue and gladius

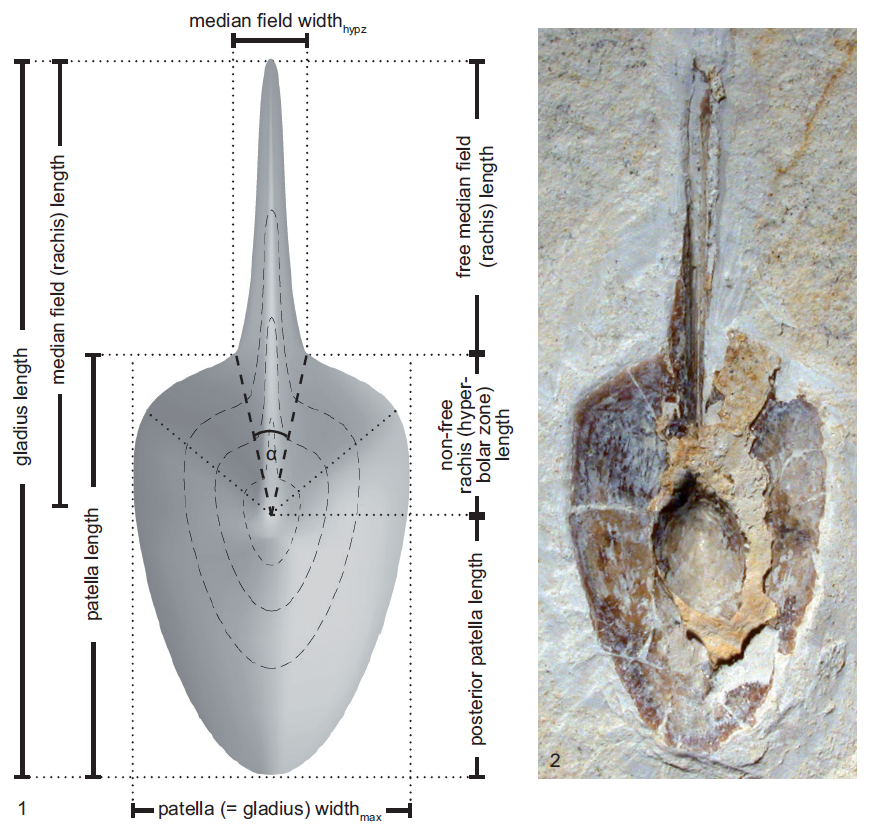
Detailed morphology and measurements of the gladius of M. scutellaris

=== Mantle and head ===
The mantle musculature of gladius-bearing cephalopods like Muensterella usually corresponds to the gladius length. In the specimen MC-51 of M. scutellaris, the mantle's musculature is almost completely preserved: a muscular mantle can be recognised in the fossil by the striated appearance created by the alternation of circular and radial muscles, which in modern cephalopods are continuous around the mantle. In Muensterella however, they extend for only a short distance, which may be the more basal state compared to modern taxa. It has been previously assumed that the imprints seen in the fossils indicate a squat body, but the preserved mantle tissues instead point to a comparatively slender body shape. Similar to modern representatives of the Octopodiformes, Muensterella appears to exhibit a head-mantle fusion, meaning there is no visible divide between the head and the mantle and the absence of a "neck", unlike in squid and cuttlefish. In some Solnhofen specimens, what is interpreted to be a strand of muscular tissue usually running in anterioposterior directions might possibly represent the funnel retractor, a muscle that pulls the funnel (or siphon) backward, helping control the direction and force of water expelled for jet propulsion and manoeuvring.

==== Mantle fins ====
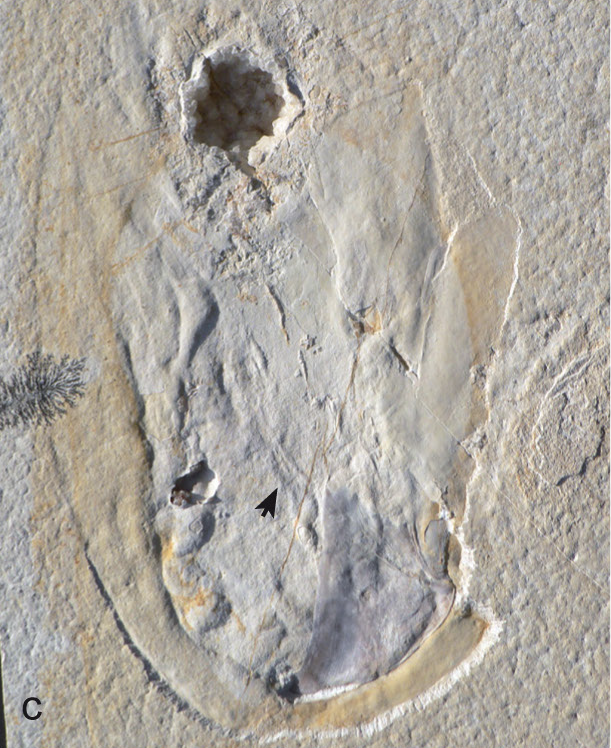
Specimen of M. scutellaris in left lateral view showing imprints of skirtlike fins, with arrow marking position of funnel retractor

In the original description by Münster, he interpreted the fossil as showing a squat body shape and lacking any signs of fins. Later reinterpretations of the holotype and additional material show a slight ridge running along the outline of the body, starting at the posterior ventral part of the conus and running up to the head region. The region separated from the mantle by the ridge does not show the same well-preserved musculature as is typical for the mantle; hence, this region has been interpreted as the remains of the mantle fins, which exhibit musculature which are not as well developed as the mantle's musculature, and thus were not preserved. Entirely unique in octopodiformes, Muensterella appears to exhibit marginal fringing or skirt-like fins similar to representatives of the Sepiidae (cuttlefish). There is no evidence of a direct connection to the gladius; it is therefore assumed that the fins were inserted into the mantle.

=== Arms ===
Muensterella shows 4 pairs of visible arm bases in at least 2 specimens preserving soft tissue from Solnhofen; this points to Muensterella having 8 arms of equal length, as is expected for octopodiformes. The very tips of the arms appear to be missing, but Muensterella still shows some of the shortest known arms among Mesozoic gladius-bearing cephalopods. The presence of tentacles is unlikely and cannot be confirmed by the fossil material. A short interbrachial web possibly extends for 1 cm (0.39 in) between the arms. The imprints of suckers are only known from a single specimen, MC-21. The circular suckers are arranged in a single row proximally, but they make a zigzag pattern the closer they get to the distal ends of the arms. Closer to the base, the suckers are larger in size, the largest being 5 mm wide, while at the end they grow to only 1 mm in width. Hooks or cirri are unknown.

=== Internal anatomy ===
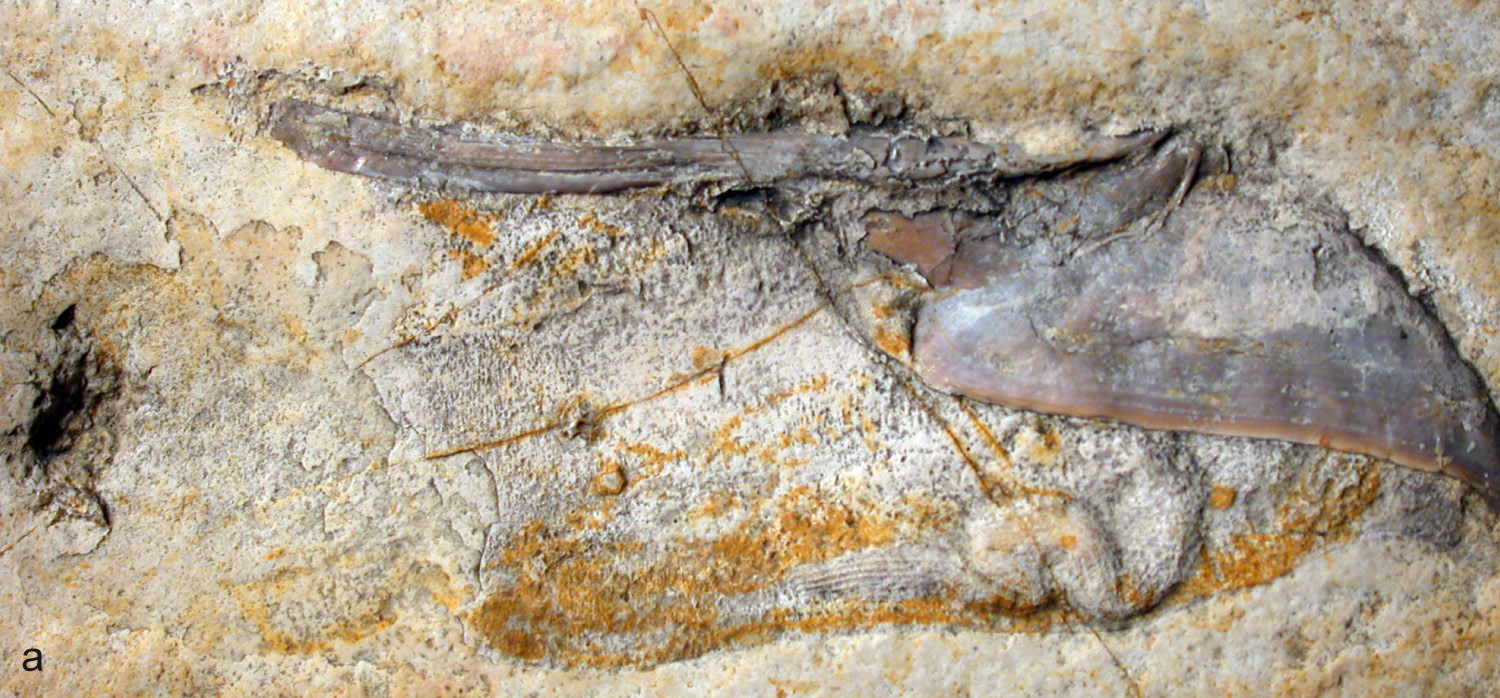
Fossilized remains of the digestive system of M. scutellaris

A few specimens show different parts of the internal anatomy of Muensterella, including the holotype of M. spinosa, which shows the imprint of an ink sac, the organ typical of cephalopods used to spray ink at predators to enable escape. A specimen of M. scutellaris preserves parts of the digestive system; the preserved remains resemble a swollen, meandering tube which, in contrast to the surrounding mantle, is longitudinally striated. It might either represent the remains of a crop, a temporary food-storage organ in the digestive system of cephalopods where captured prey is stored and softened after passing through the oesophagus, or the intestine.

== Paleobiology and paleoecology ==
Muensterella is a small octopodiforme, with M. scutellaris reaching a maximum gladius length of ~170 mm (6.7 in) and M. spinosa ~70 mm (2.8 in). The single known specimen of M. jillae is incomplete, but the patella alone is already longer than the complete gladius of M. scutellaris, with a length of ~220 mm (8.7 in).

Fossil remains of Muensterella have exclusively been found in shallow water deposits such as the Kimmeridgian to Tithonian Solnhofen Limestone, where both M. scutellaris and M. spinosa originate from. The paleogeographic region known as the Solnhofen Archipelago consisted of a series of islands and reefs which were part of a warm, tropical, shallow epicontinental sea at the northern edge of the Tethys Ocean. The limestone deposited in this region preserved one of the most speciose palaeobiotas on earth, showing a vast diversity of fish, marine reptiles, crustaceans, gastropods and cephalopods, such as Muensterella itself. The fossils themselves were deposited at the bottom of anoxic basins on the seafloor, often referred to as lagoons, which allowed for the exceptional preservation of details like their soft tissue. This means however that they were swept into the basins from surrounding environments, and did not inhabit these locations (allochthonous). Muensterella probably inhabited the surrounding coral and sponge reefs.

Muensterella was presumably a necto-benthic animal, meaning it stayed close to the sea floor while retaining the ability to move freely through the water column as it most likely represented a negatively buoyant shallow water jet swimmer, which propelled itself through the water column using the water pushed out of the siphon, similar to cuttlefish and bobtail squid. These are probably closest living analogues to the general ecological role of Muensterella; both cuttlefish and bobtail squids are ambush predators that primarily feed on crustaceans and small fish using their ability to change color to camouflage themselves, and also to avoid becoming prey themselves. While this cannot be proven by the fossil record it is probable that Muensterella shared the typical intelligence and camouflaging abilities of both cuttlefish and their closer relatives, octopus.

== Distribution and species ==
The type species of Muensterella, M. scutellaris, is found in the Solnhofen Lithographic limestones of Bavaria, Germany, a series of several different very similar fossil localities. M. scutellaris has been found in the Kimmeridgian to Tithonian Geisental Formation and the Tithonian Painten Formation, Altmühltal Formation and Mörnsheim Formation. Muensterella is so far absent from other Late Jurassic lithographic limestones such as Nusplingen or Cerin.

The second species from the Solnhofen Archipelago, M. spinosa, is known only by one specimen (BSPG 1964XXII) from the Mörnsheim Formation. It is distinguished from M. scutellaris by the prominent spines on the dorsal surface of the patella and the posteriorly shifted apex of the patella. It has been discussed whether or not this species could represent an example of sexual dimorphism, but that has been deemed unlikely.

Another specimen, referred to as Muensterella sp., is known from the Tithonian Ameghino Formation (=Nordenskjöld Formation) of Antarctica; it is too incomplete to diagnose properly as a distinct species.

An extraordinarily well-preserved specimen of what has been tentatively referred to as Muensterella aff. scutellaris hails from a Cenomanian to Turonian black shale succession near Misburg, Hannover. The specimen is very similar to the type species but distinguished by the shape of its patella, which is more slender than that of M. scutellaris. The specimen has not been named as it belongs to a private collection.

The largest species of Muensterella, M. jillae, is known by a singular incomplete specimen (NPL81150) originating from the middle Turonian South Bosque Formation. M. jillae is very similar in its gladius shape to the type species, but the apex of its conus is more posterior; the complete gladius might have been 399 mm (15.7 in) long.

"Muensterella" tonii from the late Albian Toolebuc Formation of Queensland, Australia, has been reassigned to the genus Enchoteuthis.

== Evolutionary significance and phylogeny ==
Muensterelloids have traditionally been identified as being closely related to teudopseids, a clade that includes the majority of known gladius-bearing Mesozoic cephalopods. In 1990 Engeser for the first time considered the relationship of the Muensterelloidea to the Octopoda, which includes all modern cirrate and incirrate octopus. However, a 2015 phylogenetic analysis conducted by Sutton, which only included one Muensterelloid, Muensterella itself, found it to be more closely related to trachyteuthids, with the squid-like plesioteuthids grouped closer to octopodes. This relationship has since been deemed unlikely; instead, Fuchs et al. (2020) found Muensterelloids to be sister taxa to the Palaeololiginidae. The very same analysis finds Muensterelloids, which have never been found to be paraphyletic, to consist of two main clades, the Patelloctopodidae and the ‘Muensterella–Enchoteuthidae clade’. The unusual morphology of the gladius in Patelloctopus ilgi links the morphology seen in teudopseids like Muensterella and crown cirrates and incirrates. It is possible that the patelloctopodid clade includes the last common ancestor of cirrate and incirrate octopods, whereas the "Muensterella-Enchoteuthidae" clade likely became extinct during the Late Cretaceous. Presumably, these two clades split in the middle-late Toarcian, which would make it congruent with the minimum divergence date calculated by Tanner et al. (2017) using a molecular clock analysis.

The results of the 2020 analysis show Muensterella as a grade leading up to the Enchoteuthidae:

- Vampyromorphida
  - - Teudopsis acuta
    - - Palaeololigo albersdoerferi
      - Muensterelloidea
        - Celaenoteuthis incerta
        - - Engeseriteuthis arcuatus
          - - - Listroteuthis conica
              - - Muensterella scutellaris
                - - Muensterella spinosa
                  - - Muensterella jillae
                    - - Muensterella sp.
                      - Enchoteuthidae
                        - Niobrarateuthis bonneri
                        - - Enchoteuthis melanae
                          - - Enchoteuthis cobbani
                            - Enchoteuthis tonii
            - - Tyrionella fauseri
              - - Etchesia martilli
                - - Muensterellina johnjagti
                  - - Patelloctopodidae
                      - Pearceiteuthis buyi
                      - Patelloctopus ilgi
                    - Palaeoctopodidae (Relationship with Patelloctopodidae is assumed only)
                      - - Keuppia hyperbolaris
                        - Keuppia levante
                      - Palaeoctopus newboldi
                      - Styletoctopus annae
