= Pen (disambiguation) =

A pen is a writing instrument which applies ink to a surface, usually paper.

Pen may also refer to:

== Other common meanings ==
- Pen (enclosure), an enclosure for holding animals
- Bullpen, an area at a baseball field where relief pitchers warm up
- Submarine pen, a type of submarine base
- Informal short form for penitentiary

== Places ==
- Pen, India, Maharashtra, a town and taluka
- Pen Hill, Somerset, England
- East Pen Island, also known as Pen Island, Nunavut, Canada
- Pen (livestock farm), a historic livestock farm on Jamaica

== People ==
=== Surname ===
- Albert Pen (1931–2003), French politician from Saint Pierre and Miquelon
- Catherine Pen (born 1954), French politician representing Saint Pierre and Miquelon
- Dany Pen (born 1986), Khmer-Canadian human rights activist, artist and educator
- Eric Pen (born 1992), Cambodian-American boxer
- Jan Pen (1921–2010), Dutch economist, professor and columnist
- Luke Pen (1960–2002), Australian biologist and environmental scientist
- Marta Pen (born 1993), Portuguese middle-distance runner
- Pen Panha (born 1941), Cambodian politician
- Pen Phath (born 1948), Cambodian former football manager and player
- Peter Pen (born 1972), Slovenian alpine skier
- Pen Ran (c. 1944–c. 1979), Cambodian singer and songwriter
- Pen Sovann (1936–2016), Cambodian revolutionary and politician
- Ue-Li Pen (born 1967), Canadian astrophysicist
- Varlen Pen (1916–1990), Soviet Russian-Korean painter and graphic artist
- Yudel Pen (1854–1937), Lithuanian Jewish painter and art teacher
- Le Pen, a surname

=== Given name ===
- Pen Densham (born 14 October 1947), British-Canadian film and television producer, writer and director
- Pen Foreman, 21st century archaeologist

=== Nickname ===
- Pen Cayetano (born 1954), Belizean artist and musician
- Pen Dalton (born 1944), English artist, critic and writer
- Pen Farthing (born 1969), British former Royal Marines commando and founder of the Nowzad Dogs charity
- Pen Hadow (born 1962), British Arctic region explorer, advocate, adventurer and guide
- Pen Medina (born 1950), Filipino actor
- Pen Tennyson (1912–1941), British film director

=== Stage name ===
- Queen Pen, stage name of American rapper Lynise Walters (born 1972)
- Shawn Pen, a stage name of American rapper, songwriter and producer Tyrone La Shon Wilkins (born 1969)

== Fictional characters ==
- Pen, the name of Finn the Human in the original pilot of Adventure Time
- Pen, from the first season of Battle for Dream Island, an animated web series
- Pen, one of the naughty penguin twins from the Malaysian animated series Chuck Chicken

== Other uses ==
- Pen (play), by David Marshall Grant
- "The Pen", an episode of Seinfeld
- Olympus Pen, a camera
- The 'Pen, a spectator area in the T-Mobile Park baseball stadium in Seattle
- PEN International, a worldwide association of writers founded in 1921
- Short for slave pen, an antebellum American slave jail
- Pen, an adult female swan
- Gladius (cephalopod), or pen, a hard internal body part of certain cephalopods

== See also ==
- PEN (disambiguation)
- Autoinjector pen, a medical device to deliver a dose of a drug
  - Insulin pen
- Pen Basin, Idaho, United States, a valley
- Pen Formation, a geologic formation in the United States
- Sea pen, an order of Cnidarians in the class Octocorallia
- Pen Centre, St. Catharines, Ontario, Canada, a shopping mall
- Penn (disambiguation)
- Pens (disambiguation)
- Pen Pen (disambiguation)
- Pen register, or dialed number recorder
