= Pens (disambiguation) =

Pens are common writing instruments.

Pens or PENS may also refer to:

- Pen (enclosure), enclosure for holding animals
- Pen, an adult female swan
- Gladius (cephalopod), or pen, a hard internal bodypart found in certain cephalopods
- Pittsburgh Penguins or the Pens, an American ice hockey team
- PENS (software)
- Pan-European Network Service, a telecommunications network
- Politeknik Elektronika Negeri Surabaya, a technical institution in Indonesia

== Other uses ==
- Pen (disambiguation)
- PEN (disambiguation)
- Penalty shootout
