= Penn =

Penn may refer to:

== Arts and entertainment ==
- Penn (film), 1954 Tamil film starring Vyjayanthimala
- Penn (TV series), a 1991 Tamil mini-series
- Penn (TV series), a 2006 Tamil-language soap opera
- The Penn, or The Stylus, a would-be periodical owned and edited by Edgar Allan Poe

== People ==
- Penn (name), including lists of people with the surname and given name

== Places ==
=== Australia ===
- Penn, South Australia

=== United Kingdom ===
- Penn, Buckinghamshire, England
- Penn, West Midlands, England
- Lower Penn, Staffordshire

=== United States ===
- Penn, North Dakota
- Penn, Oregon
- Pennsylvania (short form)
  - Penn, Pennsylvania
- Penn Lake Park, Pennsylvania
- Penn Township (disambiguation), several municipalities

== Other uses ==
- Penn (automobile), manufactured in Pittsburgh from 1910 until 1913
- Penn Club of New York, in New York City
- Penn Entertainment (Nasdaq: PENN), American operator of casinos and racetracks
- Penn FC, a soccer club based in Harrisburg, Pennsylvania
- Penn High School, Indiana, U.S.
- Penn Racquet Sports, a ball manufacturer
- Penn Reels, an American manufacturer of fishing tackle, a division of Jarden
- University of Pennsylvania, U.S., usually known as "Penn" or "UPenn"

== See also ==
- Pen (disambiguation)
- Penn Square (disambiguation)
