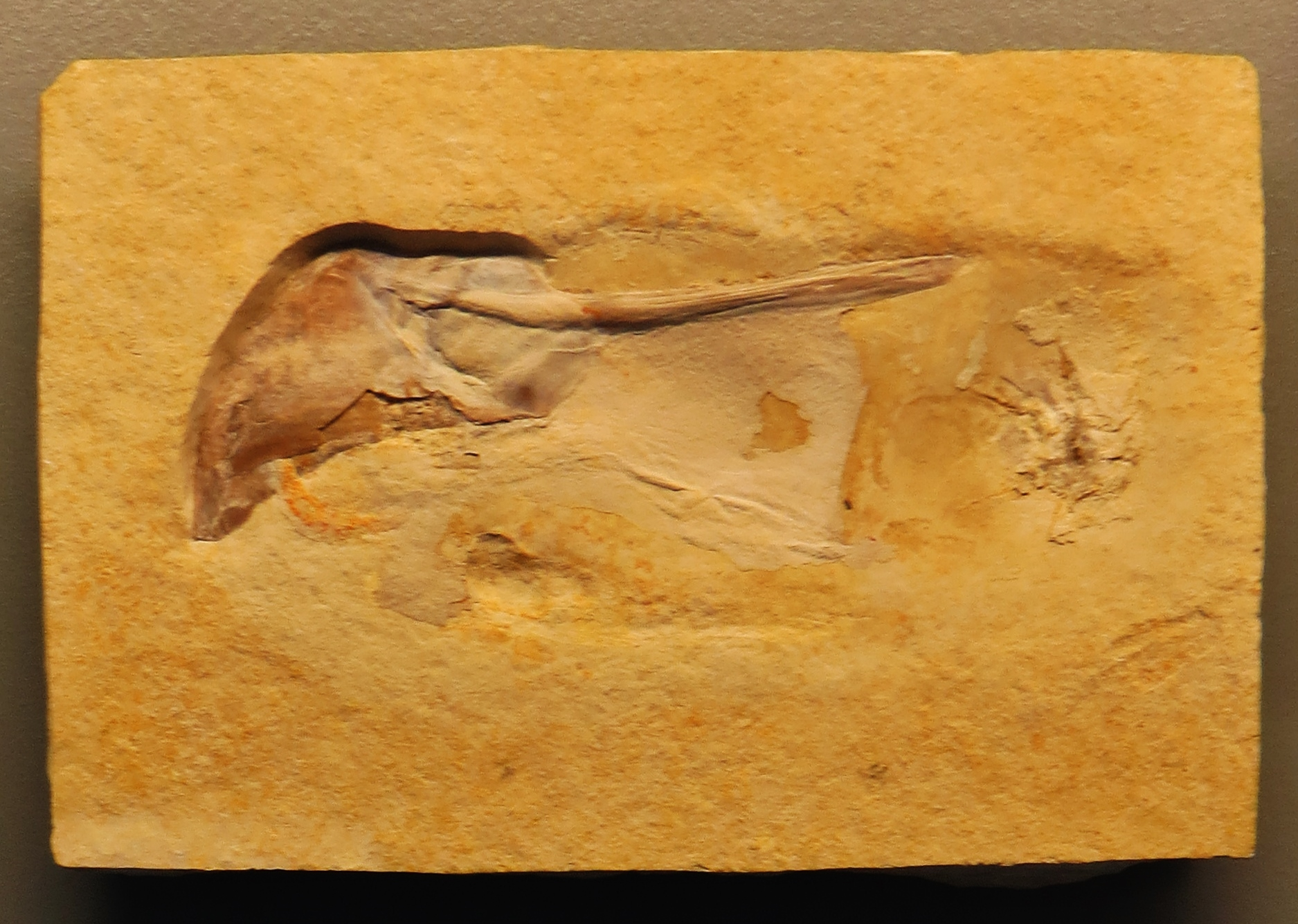
- Fossil of Muensterella scutellaris

Scientific classification
- Kingdom: Animalia
- Phylum: Mollusca
- Class: Cephalopoda
- Order: Octopoda
- Suborder: †Teudopseina
- Superfamily: †Muensterelloidea; Roger, 1952

Type species
- †Muensterella scutellaris (Münster, 1842) Schevill, 1950

Subgroups
- †Celaenoteuthis; †Engeseriteuthis; †Muensterellidae; †Patelloctopodidae

= Muensterelloidea =

Muensterelloidea Temporal range: Early Jurassic–Campanian

Superfamily of octopuses

Muensterelloidea is a superfamily (or clade) of stem-octopod cephalopods from the Early Jurassic to Late Cretaceous. Two families are currently identified, Muensterellidae, and Patelloctopodidae. The clade is the ancestral group from which modern octopus arose.

== Description ==
=== Overall ===
Soft tissue anatomy within the Muensterelloidea is well-documented. Muenster (1842), who first recorded the holotype specimen of Muensterella, noted its egg-shaped anatomy and apparent lack of swimming fins. Indeed, in all preserved specimens the same body structure is present, with all lacking a distinct swimming fin. Fuchs et al. (2003) suggested it possessed marginal fins, as a slight ridge along the sides of its body, when seen under oblique light, can be easily seen.

All members of the Muensterelloidea possessed a roughly spoon-shaped section of the gladius known as the patella. This type of gladius is believed to be ancestral to the condition present in modern octopuses, in which the gladius is vestigial.

=== Musculature ===
The musculature of muensterelloids is well-known from fossils. In certain specimens of Muensterella, bundles of muscle fibres are clearly visible. In two specimens, MC-21 and MC-51, these three-dimensional structures are continuously 100 μm thick, and the gaps between the fibres are of a near-identical size. In MC-51, almost all of the mantle musculature is preserved, covering the outer surface of the gladius and extending along its length from the posterior end up to the head region. In MC-21, preservation is faint but is still tentatively assumed to show muscles. Apart from the circular mantle musculature, preservation of the retractor muscles is widely distributed. These muscles appear to have been attached directly to the surface of the lateral sides of the gladius, and run forward up to the location of the funnel.

=== Tentacles ===
In several specimens of Muensterella, four arm bases are known. In the holotype specimen, four ridges are known, indicating four pairs of arms. Fuchs et al. (2003) note there is no indication that a fifth pair was present. Only the very tips of the arms are missing, so the arms were likely rather short. They also note the likely presence of four short arm webs, around 1 cm beyond the arm bases.

== Phylogeny ==
Muensterelloidea consists of two families: Muensterellidae and Patelloctopodidae. The muensterelloids are characterized by having a roughly spoon-shaped end of the gladius called the patella. This type of gladius is likely ancestral to the gladius remnants of modern octopuses. Cladistic analysis indicates that modern octopus are descended from the Patelloctopididae.
