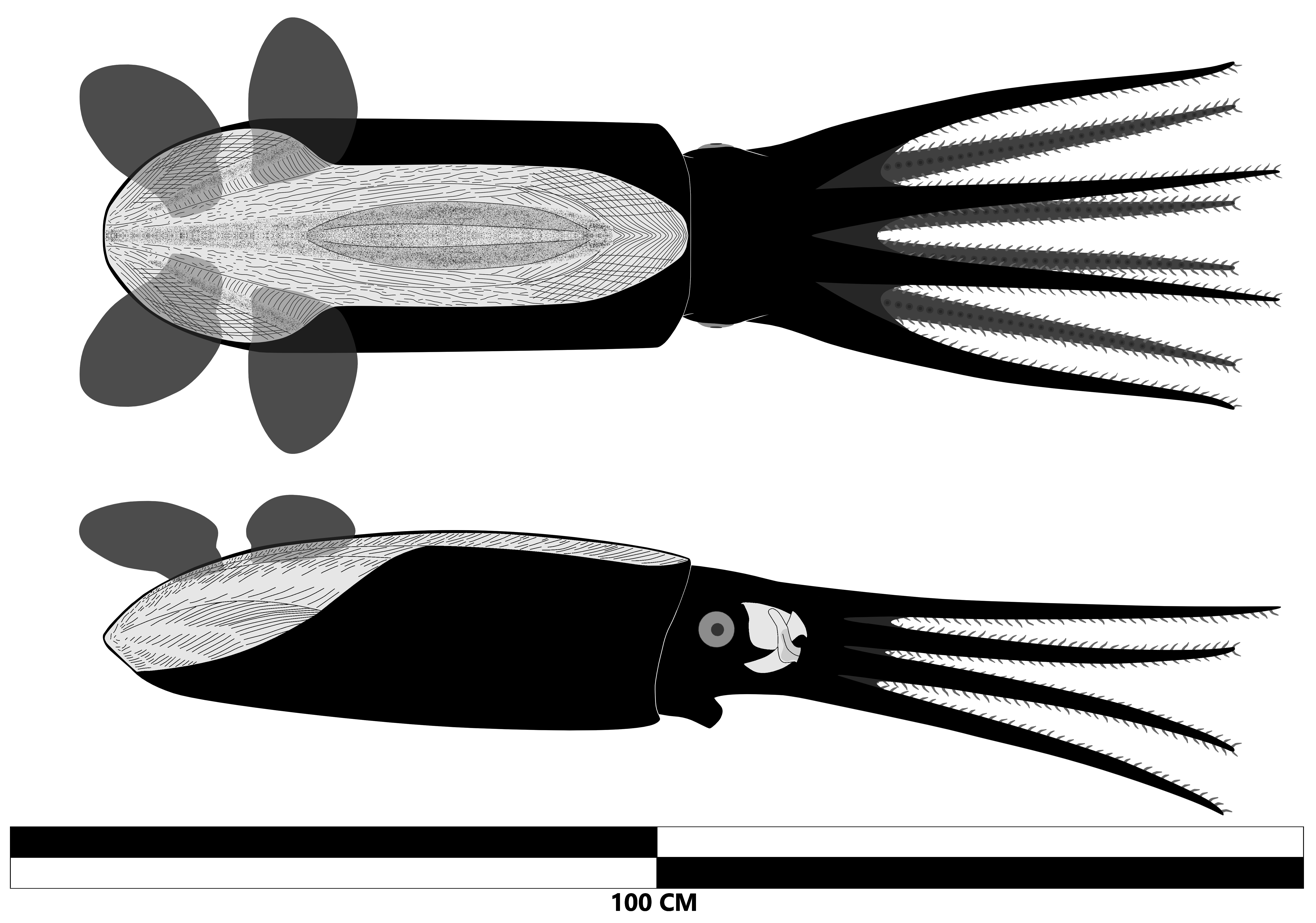
- Trachyteuthis hastiformis diagram depicting soft tissue and gladius

Scientific classification
- Kingdom: Animalia
- Phylum: Mollusca
- Class: Cephalopoda
- Order: Vampyromorpha
- Family: †Trachyteuthididae
- Genus: †Trachyteuthis; Meyer, 1846

Type species
- †Trachyteuthis hastiformis Rüppel, 1829

Other species
- †T. latipinnis (Owen, 1855); †T. palmeri (Schevill, 1950); †T. zhuravlevi (E. L. Hecker & R- F- Hecker, 1955); †T. nusplingensis (Fuchs et al., 2007); †T. teudopsiformis (Fuchs et al., 2007); †T. covacevichi (Fuchs and Schultze, 2008); †T. chilensis (Riccardi, 2016); †T. bacchiai (Fuchs & Larson, 2011)

Synonyms
- Coccoteuthis Owen, 1855

= Trachyteuthis =

Trachyteuthis Temporal range: Callovian–Cenomanian

Genus of fossil cephalopod

Trachyteuthis (meaning "rough squid") is an extinct genus of octobrachian cephalopod comprising nine species with an almost global distribution, living from the Callovian to the Cenomanian age of the Mesozoic. While similar in appearance to modern squid or cuttlefish (Decapodiformes), this taxon is actually more closely related to the vampire squid.

== History ==
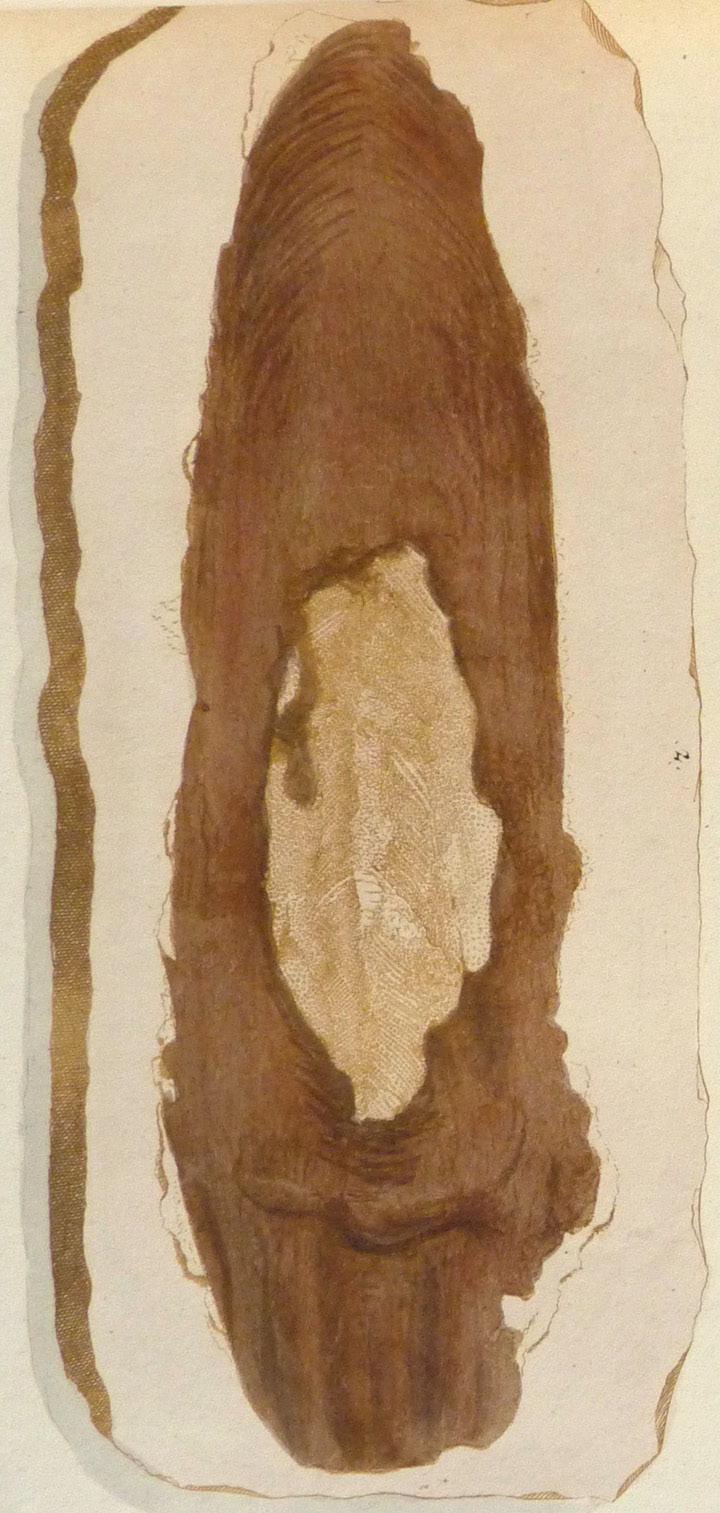
Georg Wolfgang Knorrs original illustration of the gladius of Trachyteuthis hastiformis

The first specimen of Trachyteuthis from the Solnhofen Lithographic Limestone was illustrated in 1773 by Georg Wolfgang Knorr, who erroneously identified it as fish remains. The first formal description of what would later become Trachyteuthis was conducted by Dr. Eduard Rüppel in 1829. Rüppel described his specimen as Sepia hastiformis due to the superficial similarity the gladius of Trachyteuthis bears to that of the extant cuttlefish genus Sepia. Following Rüppell’s original description, Georg Graf zu Münster recognised a further 7 species from the Solnhofen Limestones in 1837 but was unable to give either descriptions or illustrations of these species after falling sick, leaving Alcide d'Orbigny to publish them in a series of publications based on notes given to him by Münster. The whole of Münster's unfinished manuscript was published after his death in 1846, within "Beiträge zur Petrefaktenkunde". Meanwhile, Férrussac and d'Orbigny revised Münster's ideas, mentioning that the differences between Münster's proposed species are most likely the consequences of ontogeny or preservational artefacts.

In 1846 Christian Erich Hermann von Meyer pointed out the morphological differences between the gladii found in Solnhofen and those of modern cuttlefish, choosing to erect the genus Trachyteuthis. However, he disregarded previous publications, choosing to name two new species T. oblonga and T. ensiformis, disregarding S. hastiformis. In the meantime the first specimens to later become a part of Trachyteuthis were described from outside the Solnhofen Limestone in 1855 with Richard Owen's description of material from the Kimmeridge Clay, which he named Coccoteuthis latipinnis. In the following decades various species of Trachyteuthis would be described from all across the world; however, the exact taxonomic affinity of the genus has been under debate. Early hypotheses interpreted Trachyteuthis and related taxa as "fossil teuthids" or as members of Sepiidae. Later on Bandel and Leich introduced an alternative idea which has now become generally accepted: that these animals are members of the Vampyromorpha, pointing out that all of them have 8 arms lacking tentacles.

== Description ==
Dozens of well-preserved specimens of T. hastiformis and T. nusplingensis, as well as the related Glyphiteuthis libanotica from the Sannine Formation of Lebanon, allow for a detailed reconstruction of not just the gladius morphology of this genus but also of its soft tissue structures.

=== Gladius ===
The gladius, the chitinous pen in the dorsal mantle, is a sturdy but flexible structure found today in Vampyromorpha, Oegopsida, Myopsida, and Sepiolida. It is commonly regarded as originating from the proostracum of belemnoids. Trachyteuthis itself has a teudopseid-type gladius; the anterior extremity is rounded, and in contrast to the gladii of loligosepiids, the hyperbolar zones and lateral fields are shortened. Most characteristic of Trachyteuthidae as a whole are sepiid-like granules (tubercles) on the dorsal surface of the gladius.

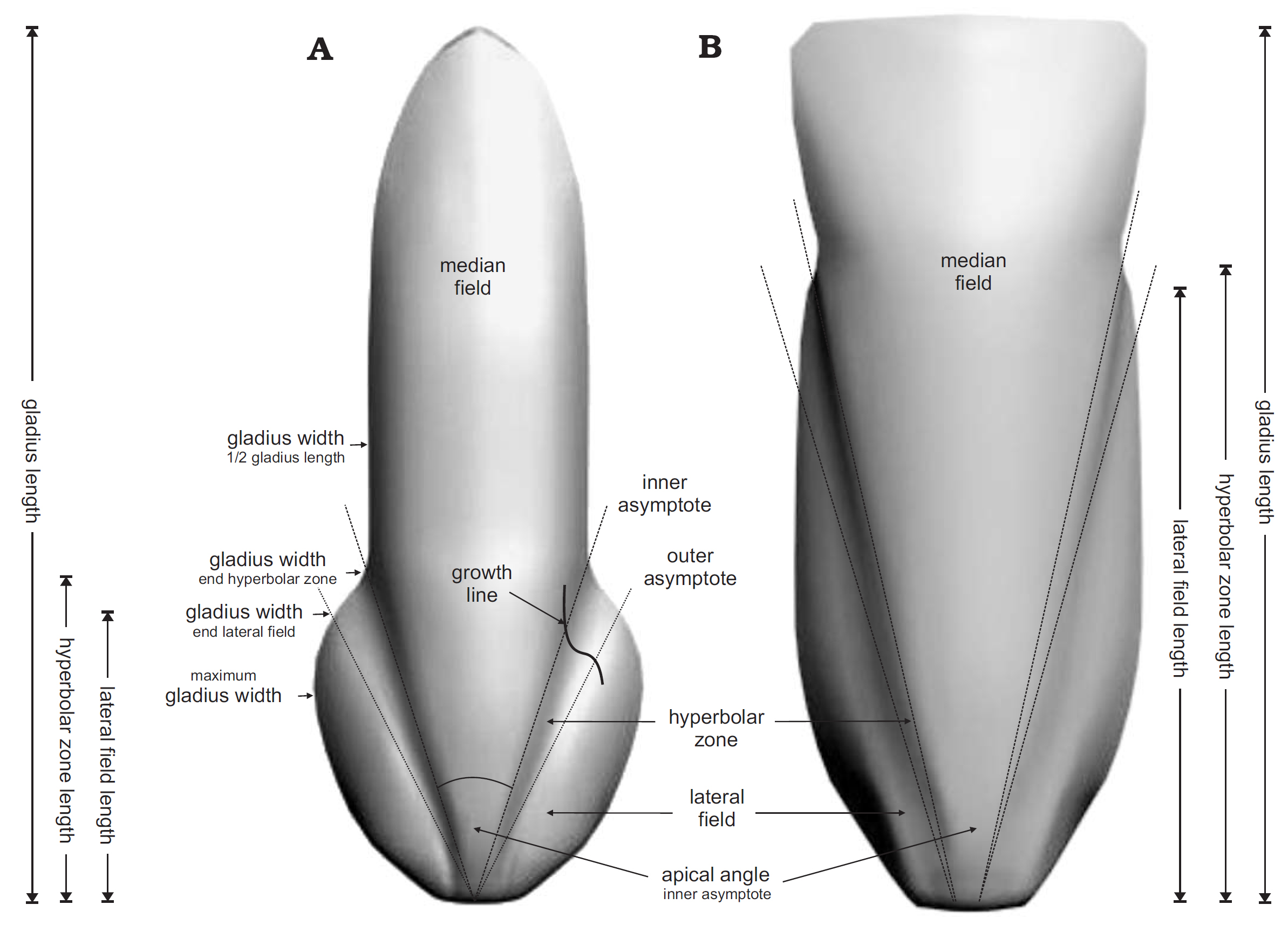
Morphology, terminology and measurements of a vampyropod gladius. A. Trachyteuthis. B. Loligosepia

In a study on 50 Trachyteuthis specimens from the Solnhofen and Nusplingen Limestones, Fuchs (2007) describes three different morphotypes in respect to the median field of the gladius which represent the 3 different species found in these deposits. The non-planar type, which is found in the type species T. hastiformis, shows a distinct spindle-shaped elevation, surrounded by a depression, along the longitudinal axis of the median field. In comparison, the gladii of T. nusplingensis exhibit a planar type with no visible depression or elevation on the dorsal side of the gladius. Lastly, T. teudopsiformis shows a prominent, well-developed keel on the dorsal surface of the gladius, similar to the Early Jurassic Teudopsis. More distinct morphologies are found in the other species of Trachyteuthis.

=== Beak ===
The beak of Trachyteuthis is known by remains of T. nusplingensis from the Nusplingen Limestone; two specimens preserve a lower and upper jaw in association with the gladii. Further isolated beaks are known from the same deposit. In its flattened state the lower beak displays a distinct U-shaped outline of the outer lamella with a hood consisting of two dorsolateral lappets interconnected by a narrow band of carbon coating. In most specimens a subtle three-dimensional relief is visible; this relief is smoothly rounded and very shallow, implying that the beak tip is rounded and not pointed, similar to the beak of the extant Octopus vulgaris.

=== Mantle and head ===
The mantle musculature of gladius-bearing cephalopods like Trachyteuthis usually corresponds to the shell length. A muscular mantle can be recognised in the fossil by the striated appearance created by the alternation of circular and radial muscles, which in modern cephalopods are continuous around the mantle; however, in Trachyteuthis, they extend for only a short distance, which might be a more basal state than modern taxa. The mantle of Trachyteuthis is exclusively attached to the exterior margin of the gladius. A fusion of the head and mantle as seen in modern octopods and some other Jurassic octobrachians cannot be identified in Trachyteuthis, implying a more distinct head akin to modern decapodiformes.

==== Mantle fins ====
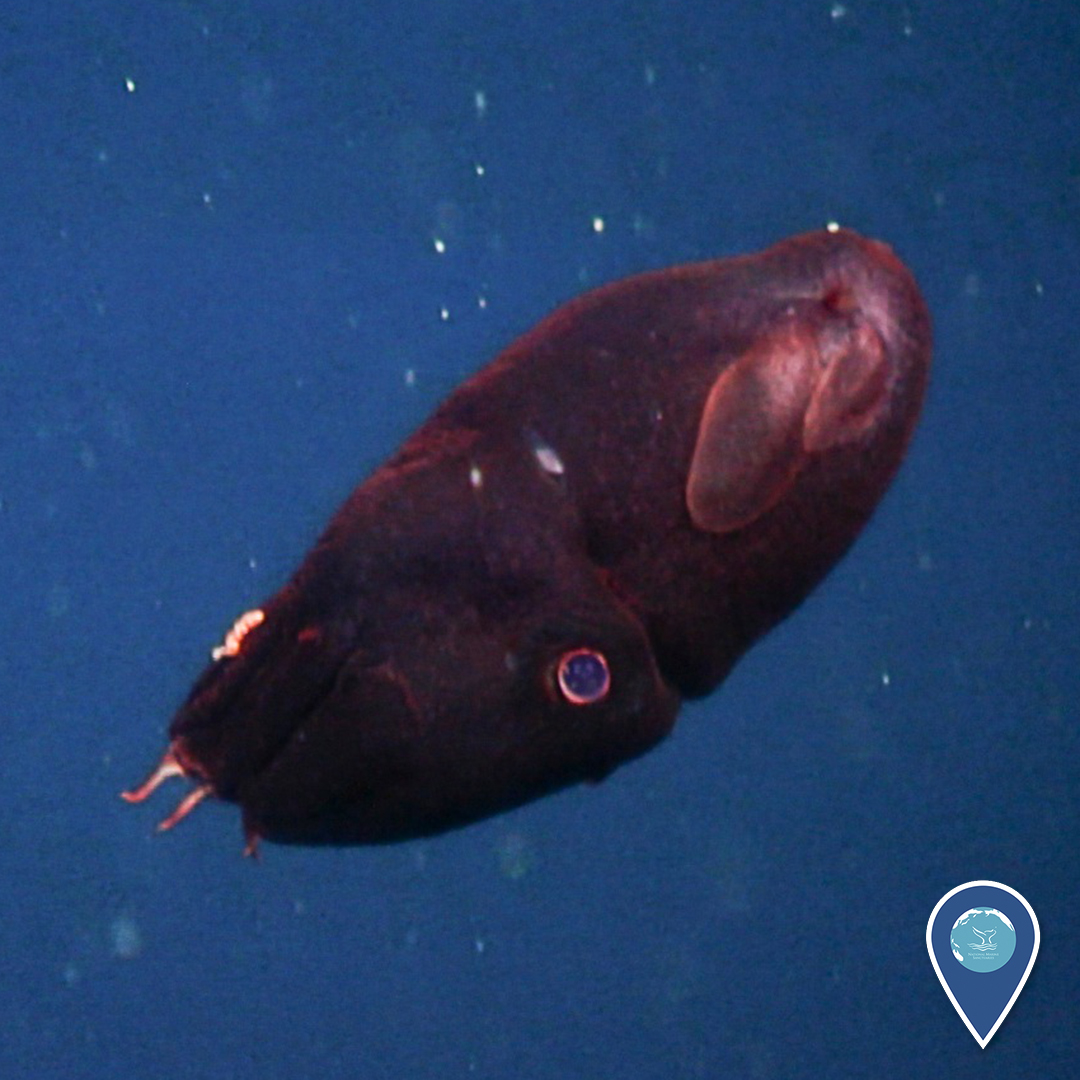
Juvenile Vampyroteuthis showing two distinct pairs of mantle fins, similar to Trachyteuthis

Characteristic of Trachyteuthis' soft tissue anatomy is the presence of four mantle fins, a condition shared with Plesioteuthis and juveniles of the extant Vampyroteuthis (vampire squid). The fins are preserved in several specimens of T. hastiformis from the Solnhofen Limestone and they appear more pointed than rounded. However, that may be a preservational artefact. The fins appear to insert into the channel-like surface of the hyperbolar zones of the dorsal side of the gladius. Preservation of what appears to be the fin cartilage in the related taxon Glyphiteuthis, implies that the posterior fin pair was supported by a basal fin cartilage and that the fin pairs were clearly separated from each other.

=== Arms ===
The arm crown of Trachyteuthis is made up of 8 arms characteristic of Octobrachia. Among Jurassic gladius-bearing cephalopods, Trachyteuthis has long arms, being 70-80% of the mantle length. Arm width appears to correlate to length, with Trachyteuthids having slimmer arms than shorter-armed taxa, giving them a filamentous appearance; they taper evenly from the base to the tip. The presence of tentacles or tentacular pockets cannot be confirmed in Trachyteuthis or any related taxon. An interbrachial arm web has been proposed for Trachyteuthis, which is probably not longer than one-third of the total arm length. The arms of Trachyteuthis lack hooks; any further details are not preserved in specimens from Solnhofen. However, fossils of Glyphiteuthis hailing from the Sannine Formation show the presence of filament-like appendages which most likely represent cirri as seen in modern cirrate octopus. Additionally, Glyphiteuthis preserves a singular row of suckers along the entire stretch of the arm; it is to be assumed that Trachyteuthis shared these traits.

=== Internal anatomy ===
Trachyteuthis is notable for preserving parts of its internal anatomy; notably, Trachyteuthis preserves feather-like gills, making clear that early coleoids are already dibranchiate. Furthermore, Trachyteuthis is the only fossil cephalopod to preserve a Needham sac in the form of a spirally enrolled and segmented cord; extant cephalopods store sperm packages in the expanded region of the genital duct that is the Needham sac.

== Paleobiology and paleoecology ==
Trachyteuthis species are among the larger octobrachians of the Mesozoic, reaching gladius lengths of up to 45 centimetres (18 in) for T. hastiformis, 33.5 centimetres (13.2 in) for T. nusplingensis and 36 centimetres (14 in) for T. bacchiai; however, some species like T. teudopsiformis are far smaller, having a gladius only up to 7 centimetres (2.8 in) in length. While primarily originating from shallow water lagoonal deposits such as the Solnhofen Limestone, Nusplingen Limestone or Sannine Formation, it is probable that Trachyteuthis is a largely pelagic taxon, nektonic to nekto-benthic; they are likely to have been fast, highly maneouvrable shallow-water jet swimmer associated with the sea floor.

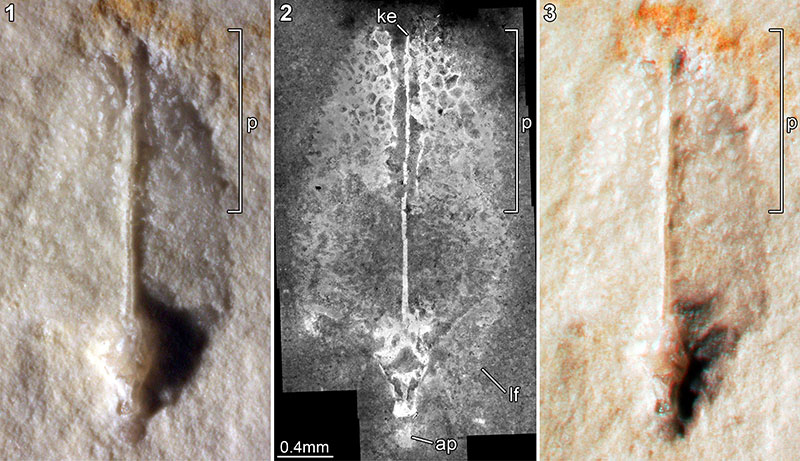
Small fossil of a paralarval cephalopod from Solnhofen. This animal may be related to Trachyteuthis

Trachyteuthis was probably an opportunistic predator with a focus on ammonites, as indicated by stomach contents showing the remains of small fish, hooks of other coleoids and lamellaptychi. The strong octopus-like beak of Trachyteuthis allowed it to crush ammonite shells using the suckers and cirri on its arms to hold their prey in place. Several regurgitalites from Solnhofen and Nusplingen containing undigested ammonite aptychi are likely to have been made by coleoids like Trachyteuthis since the alkaline pH in the stomach of Vampyropods is insufficient to digest these hard parts.

A 3 mm long fragmentary gladius of a paralarval cephalopod from Solnhofen with a morphology principally shared by Trachyteuthids may be the remains of a juvenile Trachyteuthis, sharing the greatest similarity to the gladius of T. teudopsiformis; the distinct presence of a keel and an ornamented anterior kite-shaped region support this assessment.

== Distribution and species ==
Several species and hundreds of specimens of Trachyteuthis are known from around the globe from the Callovian up to the Cenomanian with differing levels of preservational quality and often an uncertain taxonomic identity.

The oldest record of Trachyteuthis hails from the Callovian of Christian Malford in Wiltshire, England; however, the singular specimen is too poorly preserved to properly attribute it to a species or distinct morphotype. Another supposed equally old occurrence of Trachyteuthis from the Callovian of Chile has been redescribed as a distinct genus and species; Pseudoteudopsis perezi.

Schevill (1950) described "Voltzia" palmeri from the Oxfordian age Jagua Formation of Cuba, a low-energy shallow-water deposit with water depths probably reaching no more than twelve metres (39 ft) deep. This taxon is distinguished from T. hastiformis by the growth lines of the inner shell layers in the central field being more prominent and chevron-shaped despite being most similar to the planar-type of Trachyteuthis gladii. However, it is likely not distinct enough to be treated as a separate genus.

Two further species of Trachyteuthis are known from the Oxfordian of Quebrada del Profeta, Antofagasta Region of Northern Chile: T. covacevichi is distinguished from T. hastiformis primarily by being wider and lacking the spindle-shaped elevation of the median field; T. chilensis also lacks the spindle-shaped elevation but also has a more elongated gladius.

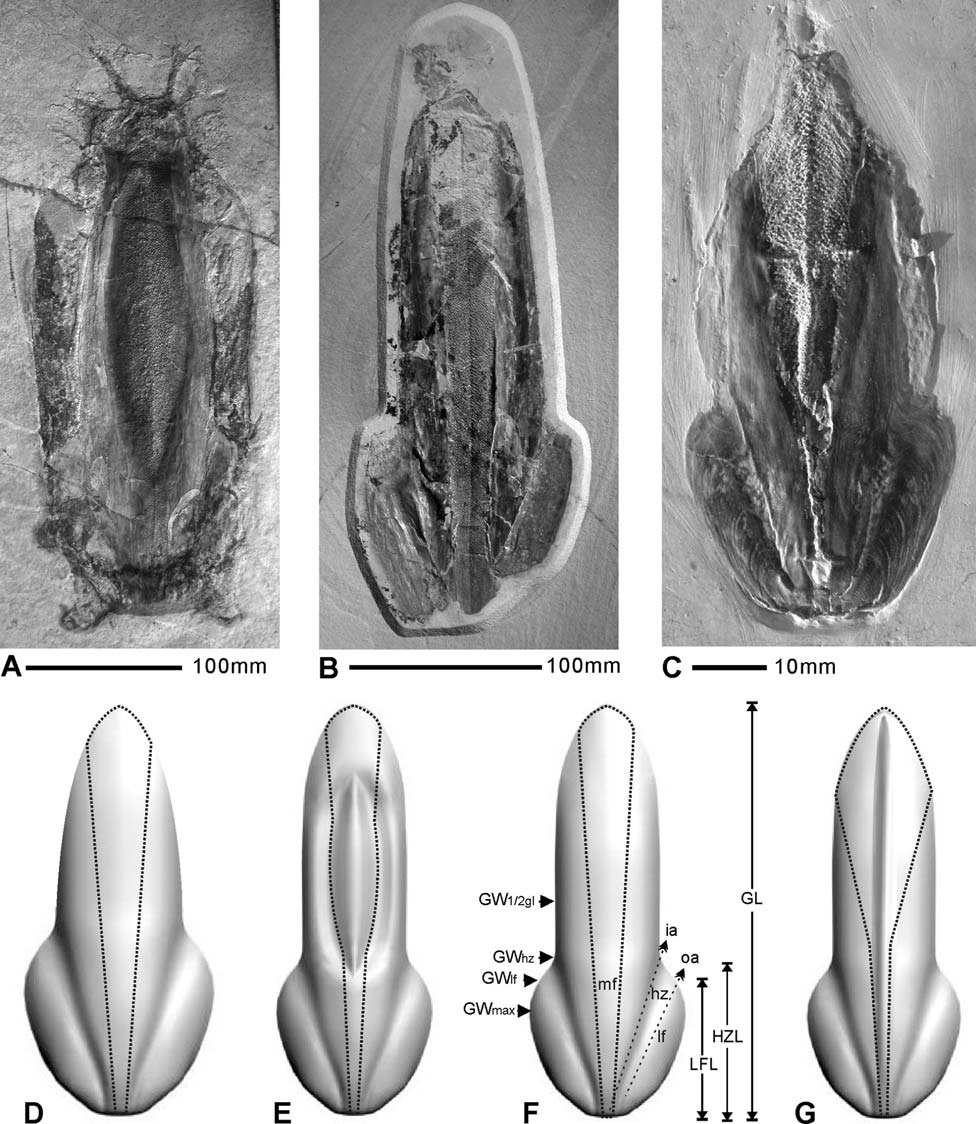
A. T. hastiformis B. T. nusplingensis C. T.teudopsiformis D. Reconstruction of the gladius of T. covacevichi E. Reconstruction of T. hastiformis; F. Reconstruction of T. nusplingensis; G. Reconstruction of T. teudopsiformis

The greatest diversity of Trachyteuthis species is found in the Kimmeridgian to Tithonian lithographic limestones of Southern Germany with T. hastiformis, T. nusplingensis and T. teudopsiformis. Identifiable by the distinct spindle-shaped elevation on the gladius median field, T. hastiformis was first found in the Altmühltal Formation of the Solnhofen Archipelago but since then has also been found in the Painten, Torleite, and Mörnsheim Formations; the genus probably also occurred in the Nusplingen Limestone. More prominently found in the Nusplingen Limestone is T. nusplingensis, characterised by a smooth median field; however, it may also be present in the Solnhofen Archipelago. So far only known from the Altmühltal Formation is T. teudopsiformis with its characteristic Teudopsis-like keel. These lithographic limestones are the product of sediments deposited at the bottom of anoxic basins in the sea floor, often called lagoons, which allowed for the excellent preservation of fossil material. These lagoons were surrounded by a variety of different habitats, such as sponge or coral reefs, as well as seemingly more open ocean environments. Remains of plants, insects, and terrestrial tetrapods such as Archaeopteryx imply their proximity to islands. The Solnhofen Archipelago is home to a megadiverse fauna, including marine reptiles like Dakosaurus and Aegirosaurus, dozens of fish taxa like Gyrodus, Aspidorhynchus, and Caturus along with several other octobrachian taxa like Plesioteuthis, Muensterella and Leptotheuthis.

Despite being relatively abundant in the German lithographic limestones, Trachyteuthis has yet to be described from the French Cerin and Canjuers Lagerstätten; however, a singular gladius of Trachyteuthis sp. has been reported from the Kimmeridgian lithographic limestone of the Causse Méjean.

Another Kimmeridgian record of Trachyteuthis is known from the Kimmeridge Clay of England, originally described as Coccoteuthis latipinnis by Owen in 1950. The few specimens of this species are probably identical to the non-planar Trachyteuthis hastiformis since the specimens by Owen appear to feature the same spindle-shaped elevation on the median field. Further study of this material may be necessary.

A very obscure record of Trachyteuthis originates from the Middle Volga region of Russia, this being T. zhuravlevi. Knowledge about this incomplete specimen is very poor, though it does bear resemblance to the planar type. It was described together with a small obscure Tihonian octobrachian fauna, including Plesioteuthis sp. and Parabelopeltis? sp.

The Tithonian Ameghino Formation (=Nordenskjöld Formation) of Antarctica possesses a species of Trachyteuthis based on a singular isolated gladius tentatively referred to as Trachyteuthis cf. hastiformis.

A 6 centimetres (2.4 in) long gladius from the Aptian of Heligoland, Germany, has been referred to Trachyteuthis sp.; it is too poorly preserved to be more specifically assigned.

The youngest record of Trachyteuthis comes from the Cenomanian of the Lebanese Sannine Formation with T. bacchiai. In contrast to other Trachyteuthis species, this species' gladius is more slender and posteriorly less rounded. The Sannine Formation is thought to have been the result of deep basins located between rudist patch reefs on the outer edge of a continental shelf.

=== Phylogeny ===
The evolutionary relationship of Trachyteuthis has been a topic of debate since its discovery owing to the superficial similarity of its gladius to the cuttlebones of extant Sepiids; however, a detailed phylogenetic analysis by Sutton et al. (2015) based on morphological characters shows that Trachyteuthis and other gladius-bearing Mesozoic cephalopods are octopodiformes; the following cladogram is based on the constrained, implied weights, consensus of two equally parsimonious phylogenetic trees, from Sutton et al.'s study; notably, it also finds Trachyteuthis to be paraphyletic:

- Octopodiformes
  - - - - Paleololigo
        - Teudopsinia
      - - Rachiteuthis
        - Teudopsis bunellii
    - - Teudopsis bollensis
      - - Teudopsis jeletzkyi
        - - - Glyphidopsis
            - - Glyphiteuthis abisaadiorum
              - - Glyphiteuthis libanotica
                - - Glyphiteuthis ornata
                  - Glyphiteuthis freijii
          - - Glyphiteuthis rhinophora
            - - Trachyteuthis bacchiai
              - - - Vampyroteuthis (Vampire squid)
                  - Vampyronassa
                - - - Trachyteuthis hastiformis (Type)
                    - - Actinosepia
                      - - Muensterella
                        - Styloteuthis
                  - - - Trachyteuthis teudopsiformis
                      - Trachyteuthis covacevichi
                    - - Trachyteuthis nusplingensis
                      - - Glyphiteuthis minor
                        - Teudopsis subcostata
  - - Geopeltidae
    - - Loligosepiidae
      - - Leptotheuthis
        - - Plesioteuthididae
          - Octopoda
            - Cirrata
            - - Paleoctopus pelagicus
              - - Paleoctopus newboldi
                - Incirrata
