= Penn Township =

Penn Township may refer to the following townships in the United States:

== Illinois ==
- Penn Township, Shelby County, Illinois
- Penn Township, Stark County, Illinois

== Indiana ==
- Penn Township, Jay County, Indiana
- Penn Township, Parke County, Indiana
- Penn Township, St. Joseph County, Indiana

== Iowa ==
- Penn Township, Guthrie County, Iowa
- Penn Township, Jefferson County, Iowa
- Penn Township, Johnson County, Iowa
- Penn Township, Madison County, Iowa

== Kansas ==
- Penn Township, Osborne County, Kansas; see Osborne County, Kansas

== Michigan ==
- Penn Township, Michigan in Cass County

== Minnesota ==
- Penn Township, McLeod County, Minnesota

== Missouri ==
- Penn Township, Sullivan County, Missouri

== Ohio ==
- Penn Township, Highland County, Ohio
- Penn Township, Morgan County, Ohio

== Oklahoma ==
- Penn Township, Woods County, Oklahoma
- Penn Township, Woodward County, Oklahoma

== Pennsylvania ==
- Penn Township, Berks County, Pennsylvania
- Penn Township, Butler County, Pennsylvania
- Penn Township, Centre County, Pennsylvania
- Penn Township, Chester County, Pennsylvania
- Penn Township, Clearfield County, Pennsylvania
- Penn Township, Cumberland County, Pennsylvania
- Penn Township, Huntingdon County, Pennsylvania
- Penn Township, Lancaster County, Pennsylvania
- Penn Township, Lycoming County, Pennsylvania
- Penn Township, Perry County, Pennsylvania
- Penn Township, Philadelphia County, Pennsylvania, defunct, now part of Philadelphia
- Penn Township, Snyder County, Pennsylvania
- Penn Township, York County, Pennsylvania

== See also ==
- East Penn Township, Pennsylvania
- Penn Forest Township, Pennsylvania
- Penn Hills, Pennsylvania
- West Penn Township, Pennsylvania
- Penn (disambiguation)
