= Niobrarateuthis =

Niobrarateuthis Temporal range: Cretaceous
- Holotype gladius

Scientific classification
- Kingdom: Animalia
- Phylum: Mollusca
- Class: Cephalopoda
- Order: Octopoda
- Family: †Muensterellidae
- Genus: †Niobrarateuthis; Walker, 1957

Type species
- Niobrarateuthis bonneri Walker, 1957

Other species
- Niobrarateuthis walkeri

Extinct genus of molluscs

Life restoration of N. bonneri

Niobrarateuthis is an extinct genus of large cephalopod from the Cretaceous. It is closely related to the Cretaceous Tusoteuthis and the Jurassic Muensterella.

== See also ==
- Cephalopod size
