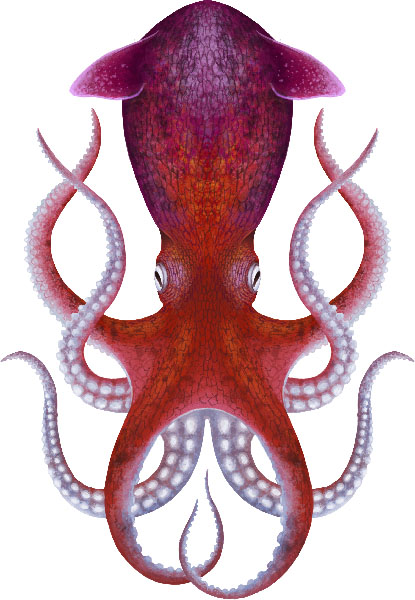
- Life restoration

Scientific classification
- Kingdom: Animalia
- Phylum: Mollusca
- Class: Cephalopoda
- Order: Octopoda
- Family: †Palaeoctopodidae
- Genus: †Palaeoctopus; Woodward, 1896b

Type species
- †Palaeoctopus newboldi (Woodward, 1896a)

Synonyms
- Genus synonymy: Calais Woodward, 1896a (preoccupied by Calais Laporte, 1838); Calaita Strand, 1928; Parateudopsis Engeser & Reitner, 1986; Species synonymy: Calais newboldi Woodward, 1896a; Calaita newboldi (Woodward, 1896a); Beloteuthis libanotica Naef, 1922; Parateudopsis libanotica (Naef, 1922)

= Palaeoctopus =

Palaeoctopus Temporal range: Santonian

Extinct genus of octopuses

Palaeoctopus is an extinct genus of octopuses that lived during the Late Cretaceous. It contains one valid species, P. newboldi, which has been found in Lebanon.

== Taxonomy ==
Holotype of Palaeoctopus newboldi

Calais newboldi was named by Henry B. Woodward in 1896 for a nearly-complete specimen from the Sahel Alma lagerstätte of Lebanon. However, that genus name was preoccupied by the beetle Calais. Woodward named Palaeoctopus as a replacement later the same year. Embrik Strand proposed the alternate replacement name Calaita in 1928.

Beloteuthis libanotica was named by Adolf Naef in 1922 for a supposed teudopsid gladius from Sahel Alma. It was moved to a new genus, Parateudopsis, by Theo Engeser and Joachim Reitner in 1986. The specimen was eventually reidentified as an isolated gladius vestige of P. newboldi.

A second species, P. pelagicus, was named by Dirk Fuchs and colleagues in 2008 for an alleged gladius vestige from the Vallecillo lagerstätte of Mexico. It was subsequently revealed to be a gular plate from a coelacanth, possibly a juvenile Megalocoelacanthus.
