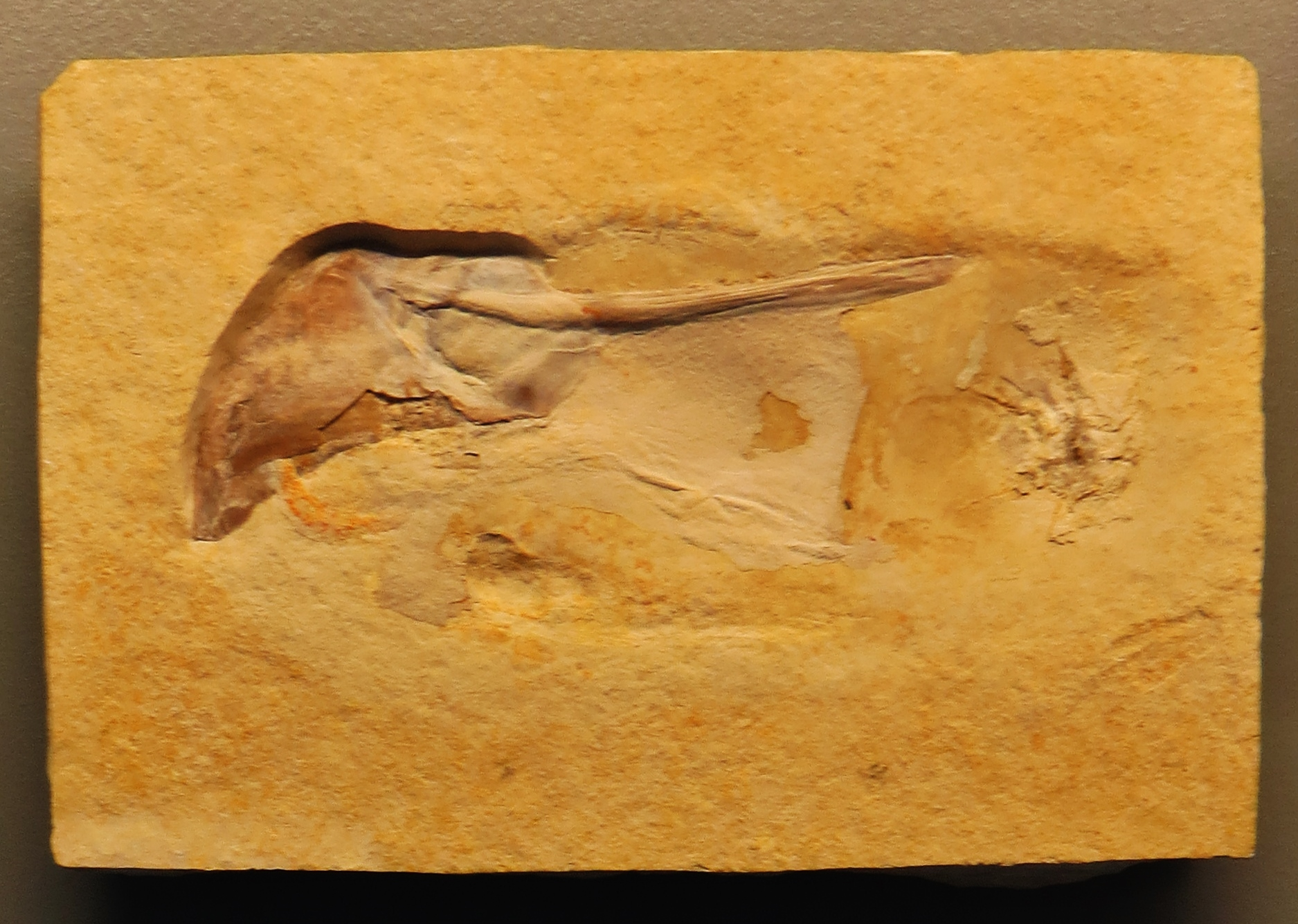
- Fossil of Muensterella scutellaris

Scientific classification
- Kingdom: Animalia
- Phylum: Mollusca
- Class: Cephalopoda
- Clade: Vampyropoda
- Suborder: †Teudopseina; Roger, 1952

Subgroups
- †Palaeololignidae; †Trachyteuthididae; †Teudopsidae; †Muensterelloidea; †Muensterellidae; †Patelloctopodidae

= Teudopseina =

Teudopseina Temporal range: Toarcian–Campanian

Family of octopuses

The Teudopseina is a clade of stem-octopods that first evolved in the Toarcian, considered the largest clade of gladius-bearing coleoids in the Mesozoic. Up to five families are known, among which the Trachyteuthidae, Trachyteuthis in particular, were the most abundant.

== Description ==
The Teudopseina can be united by five primary traits. These are the presence of a gladius, a reduced, spoon-shaped conus, a median field that is distinctly rounded or pointed anteriorly, weakly curved hyperbolar zones, and lateral fields shorter than the hyperbolar zones. Members of the superfamily Muensterelloidea are characterized by a spoon-shaped section of the gladius, known as the patella. This is believed to be ancestral to the condition present in modern octopuses.

== Taxonomy ==
The current consensus is that the Teudopseina forms a stem-group of the Octopoda. Certain taxa, such as Enchoteuthis, have sometimes been classified as either relatives of giant squids or vampire squids.
