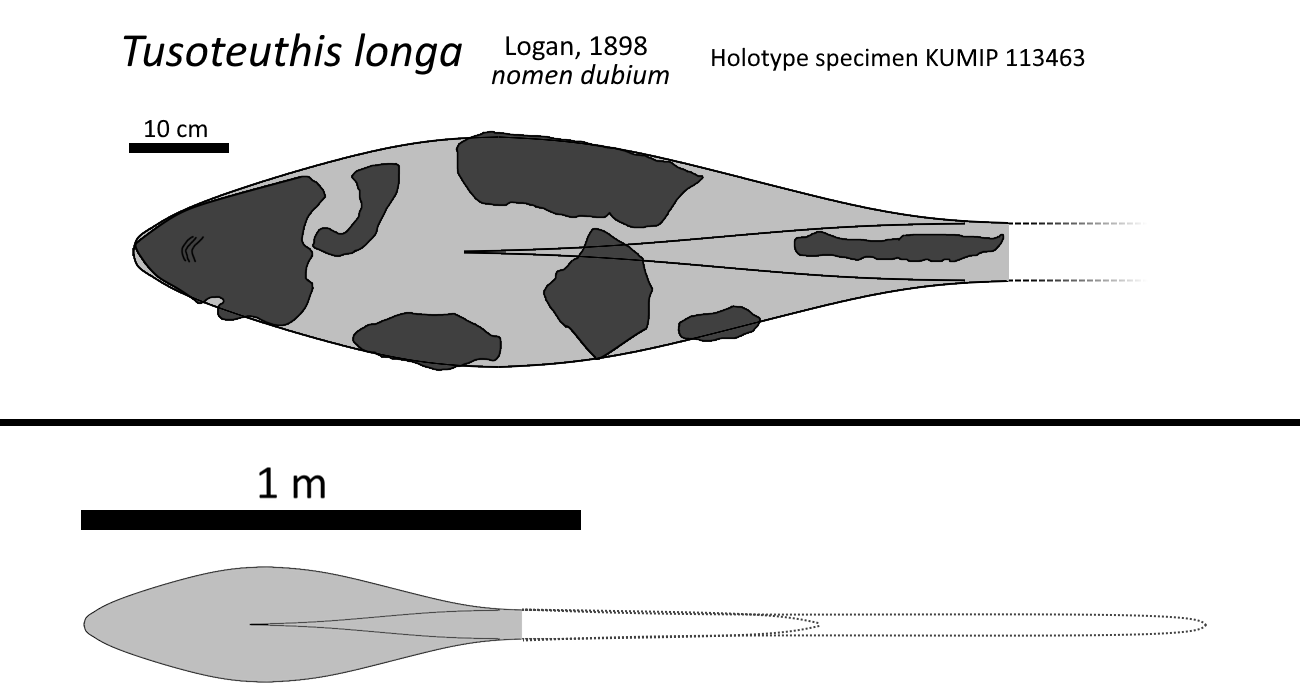
- Interpretation of the holotype specimen, with actual material shown in dark grey

Scientific classification
- Kingdom: Animalia
- Phylum: Mollusca
- Class: Cephalopoda
- Order: Octopoda
- Family: †Muensterellidae
- Genus: †Tusoteuthis; Logan, 1898

Type species
- †Tusoteuthis longa Logan, 1898

Synonyms
- Enchoteuthis? Miller & Walker, 1968

= Tusoteuthis =

Tusoteuthis Temporal range: Santonian–Campanian

Genus of Cretaceous cephalopods

Tusoteuthis is an extinct genus of large enchoteuthine cephalopod that lived during the Cretaceous. Although often called a squid, it is now thought to be more closely related to modern octopuses. Although many specimens from the Western Interior Seaway of North America were described in 2019, only one poorly preserved specimen from Kansas is recognized as Tusoteuthis. One species, T. longa, is traditionally recognized. In 2019, due to the poor preservation of the holotype specimen, Tusoteuthis was theorized to likely be a nomen dubium, and it was proposed that species described later should be included in the genus Enchoteuthis instead.

== Etymology ==
American paleontologist William N. Logan did not directly explain the etymology of Tusoteuthis when he named it in 1898. The generic name may be formed from Latin tusus "crushed" (passive participle of Latin tundo "beat, crush") + Greek teuthis "squid", alluding to the typically fragmented condition of the fossil gladius. The gender of the type species name was later corrected to the Latin feminine longa.

== Classification ==
The largest specimen that was described as Tusoteuthis was later reclassified as Enchoteuthis.

Due to the fragmentary nature of the holotype specimen, it is hard to determine whether other specimens that are described as T. longa actually belong to that species, and if T. longa itself is a nomen dubium. Some of the specimens, including gladius remains which has yielded an estimated mantle length close to or equal to that of the modern giant squid, could possibly be classified as specimens of Enchoteuthis melaneae instead. Another species of Tusoteuthis, T. cobbani was also reclassified to genus Enchoteuthis.

== Ecology ==
Enchoteuthids like Tusoteuthis are estimated to have been active predators. Fossils that are described as Tusoteuthis were found to have been preyed on by other animals, especially by the various predatory fish of the Western Interior Seaway. A fossil of the predatory aulopiform, Cimolichthys nepaholica, was found with the gladius of T. longa in its gullet. The back portion of the gladius was in the stomach region, while the mouth of C. nepaholica had remained opened, suggesting that the fish had died in the middle of swallowing the cephalopod. Researchers strongly suspect that as the fish was swallowing Tusoteuthis, the head and/or tentacles remained outside the mouth, thus blocking the gills of the fish and suffocating it as it swallowed its prey.

== See also ==
- Cephalopod size
- Enchoteuthis
