= Le Pen =

Le Pen is a Breton surname (meaning 'the head', 'the chief' or 'the peninsula'). Notable people with the name include:

- Le Pen family, the political family of France under patriarch Jean-Marie Le Pen
  - Jean-Marie Le Pen (1928–2025), French politician, founder of the National Front party
  - Marine Le Pen (born 1968), French politician, daughter of Jean-Marie and leader of the National Rally party
  - Marion Maréchal-Le Pen (born 1989), French politician, granddaughter of Jean-Marie and niece of Marine
  - Marie-Caroline Le Pen, French politician, eldest daughter of Jean-Marie
- Maurice Jules-Marie Le Pen (1889–1919), French airplane designer, designer of the Levy-Le Pen biplane
- Ulrich Le Pen (born 1974), French football player

== See also ==
- Pen (disambiguation)
