= Eric Pen =

Cambodian boxer

Eric Pieroun Pen
Personal information
- Nationality: Cambodian and American
- Born: 6 August 1992 (age 34) San Jose, California, United States
- Weight: Heavyweight

Boxing career
- Stance: Orthodox

Boxing record
- Total fights: 6
- Wins: 6
- Win by KO: 5
- Losses: 0

Eric Pieroun Pen is a Cambodian American heavyweight boxer from San Jose, California, United States but represents Cambodia. He is the current WBA Asia heavyweight champion. Eric Pen's parents are Cambodians, who were originally came from Kampot province before moving to the United States.

== Professional career ==
Eric Penn started boxing in 2014, with 6 wins, 5 knockouts, and 0 losses in his professional career. Most of his fights have been in Southeast Asia. His first pro boxing fight was in Thailand Ram 100 Thai Boxing Stadium, Ramkamhaeng, Bangkok.

Pen won the WBA Asia heavyweight title when he defeated Satria Antasena on May 18, 2019. Despite representing Cambodia, Eric Pen is currently based in Ho Chi Minh City, Vietnam.

His most recent bout occurred on February 15, 2020, at Manila Arena in Manila, Philippines, where he successfully defended his WBA Asia heavyweight title against Alexander Bajawa. Following this victory, there have been no publicly available reports detailing his activities or career developments.

== Professional boxing record ==
6 fights	6 wins	0 losses
By knockout	5	0
By decision	1	0

No.	Result	Record	Opponent	Type	Round	Date	Location	Notes
6	Win	6–0	(Philippines) Alexander Bajawa	RTD	2 (12)	15 Feb 2020	Manila Arena, Manila, Philippines	Retained the WBA Asia heavyweight championship
5	Win	5–0	(South Korea) Hu Won Lee	UD	6	29 Nov 2019	(Thailand) Sintawee Village, Jomthong, Bangkok	
4	Win	4–0	(Indonesia) David Koswara	TKO	1 (10)	3 Aug 2019	Barangay Vergara Covered Court, Barangay Vergara, Mandaluyong City, Philippines	Retained the WBA Asia heavyweight championship.
3	Win	3–0	(Indonesia) Satria Antasena	TKO	1 (10)	18 May 2019	Saigon Sports Club, Ho Chi Minh City, Vietnam	Won the vacant WBA Asia heavyweight championship.
2	Win	2–0	(Thailand) Kacha Srikong	KO	1 (8)	29 Mar 2019	Ram 100 Thai Boxing Stadium, Ramkamhaeng, Thailand	
1	Win	1–0	(Thailand) Rewat Nakkhanom	TKO	2 (6)	17 Aug 2018	Ram 100 Thai Boxing Stadium, Ramkamhaeng, Thailand	
