= Pen Pen =

Pen Pen, Pen-Pen, or Penpen may refer to:

- Pen Pen TriIcelon, a video game released for the Sega Dreamcast
- Pen Pen (Neon Genesis Evangelion), a character in the Japanese anime Neon Genesis Evangelion and the movies Evangelion: Death and Rebirth and The End of Evangelion
- The band of musicians headed by Filipino singer Emil Sanglay
- Pen-pen de Sarapen, a 1978 song written by Filipino singer Emil Sanglay
- Penpen de Sarapen, a variety show for children in the Philippines
- Pen-Pen, also known as the Rock Hopper Penguin, a character introduced in Pingu in the City.
