= Patelloctopodidae =

Patelloctopodidae Temporal range: Callovian–Kimmeridgian

Scientific classification
- Kingdom: Animalia
- Phylum: Mollusca
- Class: Cephalopoda
- Order: Octopoda
- Suborder: †Teudopseina
- Family: †Patelloctopodidae; Fuchs & Schweigert, 2018

Subgroups
- †Etchesia; †Muenstellerina; †Patelloctopus; †Pearciteuthis; †Tyrionella

Family of octopuses

Patelloctopodidae is a family of stem-octopod cephalopods from the Middle and Late Jurassic of Europe. Five genera are currently placed in the family, Etchesia, Muenstellerina, Patelloctopus, Pearciteuthis and Tyrionella, Patelloctopodidae is one of two families in the superfamily Muensterelloidea along with the Muensterellidae. They are thought to be the group from which modern octopus arose.
