= PEN =

PEN may refer to:

- Partido Ecológico Nacional (National Ecological Party), former name of the Brazilian political party Patriota (PATRI)
- PEN International, a worldwide association of writers
  - English PEN, the founding centre of PEN International
  - PEN America, located in New York City
  - PEN Center USA, part of PEN America
  - PEN Canada, Toronto
  - PEN Hong Kong
  - Sydney PEN, one of three Australian PENs
- PEN-International, Postsecondary Education Network International, an international partnership of colleges for those with hearing impairment
- Penang International Airport, Malaysia, IATA airport code: PEN
- Penarth railway station, Wales, station code: PEN
- Peruvian sol, ISO 4217 currency code PEN
- Poder Ejecutivo Nacional, the system of national executive power embodied in the President of Argentina
- Polyethylene naphthalate, a polyester
- Private Enterprise Number, an organisation identifier
- Protective earth neutral in electrical earthing systems

== See also ==
- Pen (disambiguation)
- PEN/Faulkner Foundation
