= Pen Basin =

Valley in Idaho, USA

Coordinates: 44°38′00″N 115°32′03″W

Pen Basin is a valley in the U.S. state of Idaho.

Pen Basin was so named because a trapper's pen or storage stockade was built in this basin south of the mouth of Whiskey Creek prior to the development of large scale mining in the vicinity in the later part of the 19th century.

Recreational amenities in the valley include the Penn Basin Campground and a hiking trail.
