= Pen Foreman =

Archaeologist

Pen Foreman MCIfA
- Occupation: Archaeologist

Academic background
- Education: University of York (BSc); Aberystwyth University (PGCE); University of Bournemouth (PhD)
- Thesis: Colour Out of Space: Colour in the Construction and Usage of Monuments of Neolithic Atlantic Europe (2019)

Academic work
- Discipline: Archaeology
- Sub-discipline: Community archaeology Heritage
- Institutions: Historic England; Chartered Institute for Archaeologists

Pen Foreman MCIfA is an archaeologist, Head of Learning and Outreach at Bradford Museums and Galleries, and Chair of the Board as well as Board EDI Champion at the Chartered Institute for Archaeologists (CIfA). They are noted for their work on community archaeology and engagement and Equity, Diversity and Inclusion (EDI), in which they are interested in making heritage "more inclusive" and "accessible".

== Education ==
Foreman acquired a Bachelor of Science (BSc) degree in archaeology at the University of York in 2006. They then received a Postgraduate Certificate in Education (PGCE) in primary education at Aberystwyth University in 2009. They were later educated at the University of Bournemouth where they were awarded a PhD in 2019 for their work on colour in Neolithic archaeology in Europe.

== Career ==
Foreman was the Chief Memory Maker and Storyteller, and Head of Community Archaeology, at Clwyd-Powys Archaeological Trust (CPAT) in Welshpool, Powys, from 2018 to 2022. During this, they began their role as a CIfA Board Member in 2020, before becoming the Board Champion of Equality, Diversity and Inclusion Standing Committee in 2021, and then the Honorary Chair in 2023.

In 2024 they became the Vice Chair of the National Coal Mining Museum for England but later resigned in October 2025 during Industrial Action at the Museum. They are also an elected council member for the Association for Industrial Archaeology (AIA).

=== Selected publications ===
Foreman's publications include:

- Colour Out of Space: Colour in the Construction and Usage of Monuments of Neolithic Atlantic Europe
- People, places and performance: Reflections on community archaeology and heritage in north-east Wales

=== Awards and honours ===
Foreman is an accredited Member of the Chartered Institute for Archaeologists (MCIfA).
