= Penn Square =

Penn Square may refer to the following:

- Penn Square Bank, commercial bank in Oklahoma, responsible for a financial crisis in July 1982
- Penn Square Mall, in Oklahoma City, Oklahoma
- Penn Square, Philadelphia, location of the Philadelphia City Hall
- Penn Square, a neighborhood in Lancaster, Pennsylvania
