= Etchesia =

Etchesia Temporal range: Tithonian

Scientific classification
- Kingdom: Animalia
- Phylum: Mollusca
- Class: Cephalopoda
- Order: Octopoda
- Family: †Muensterellidae
- Genus: †Etchesia; Fuchs, 2017

Type species
- Etchesia martilli Fuchs, 2017

Extinct genus of molluscs

Etchesia is a genus of muensterellid stem-octopod from the Kimmeridge Clay Formation of southern England. It is monotypic, consisting solely of type species E. martilli.
