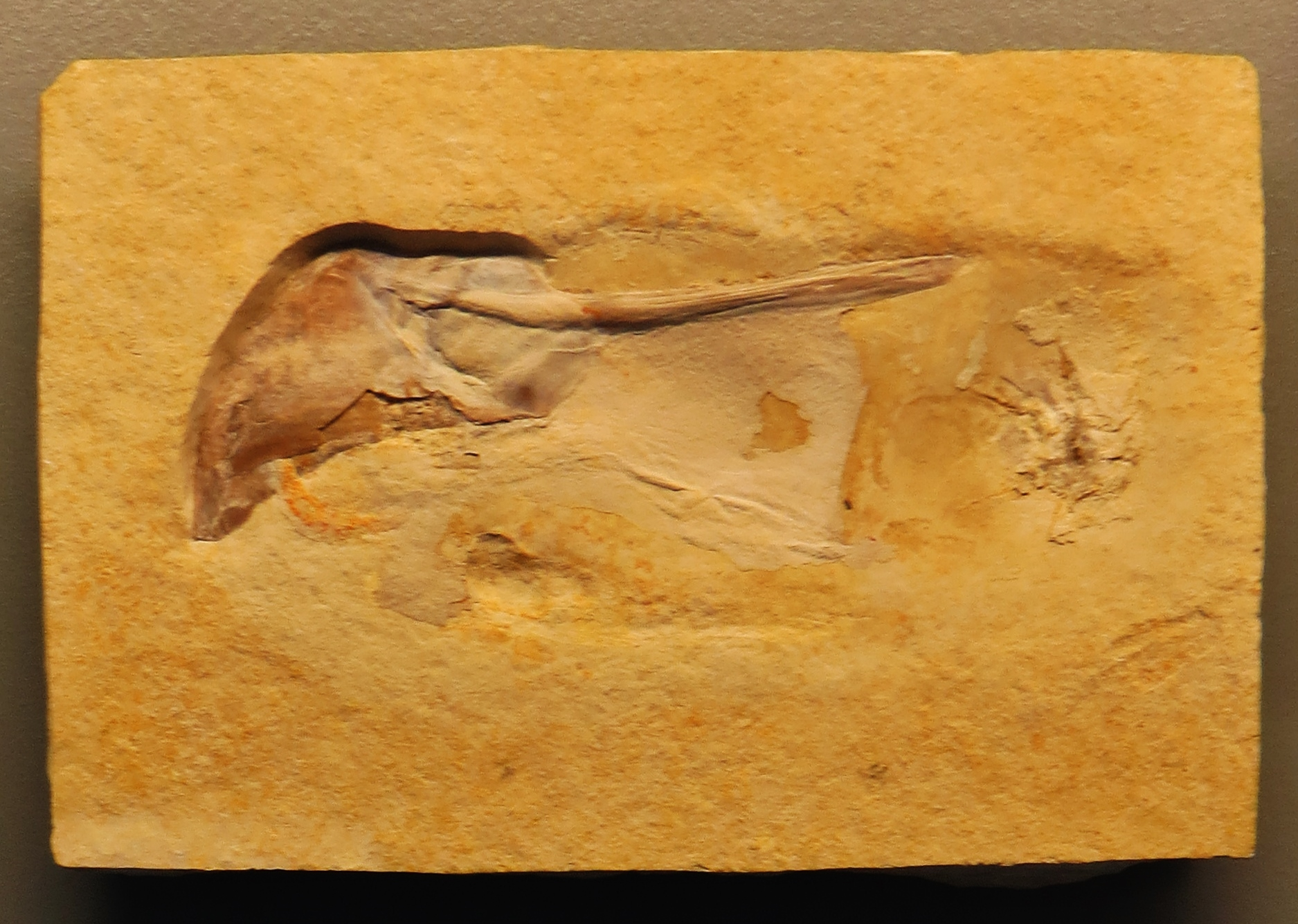
- Fossil of Muensterella scutellaris
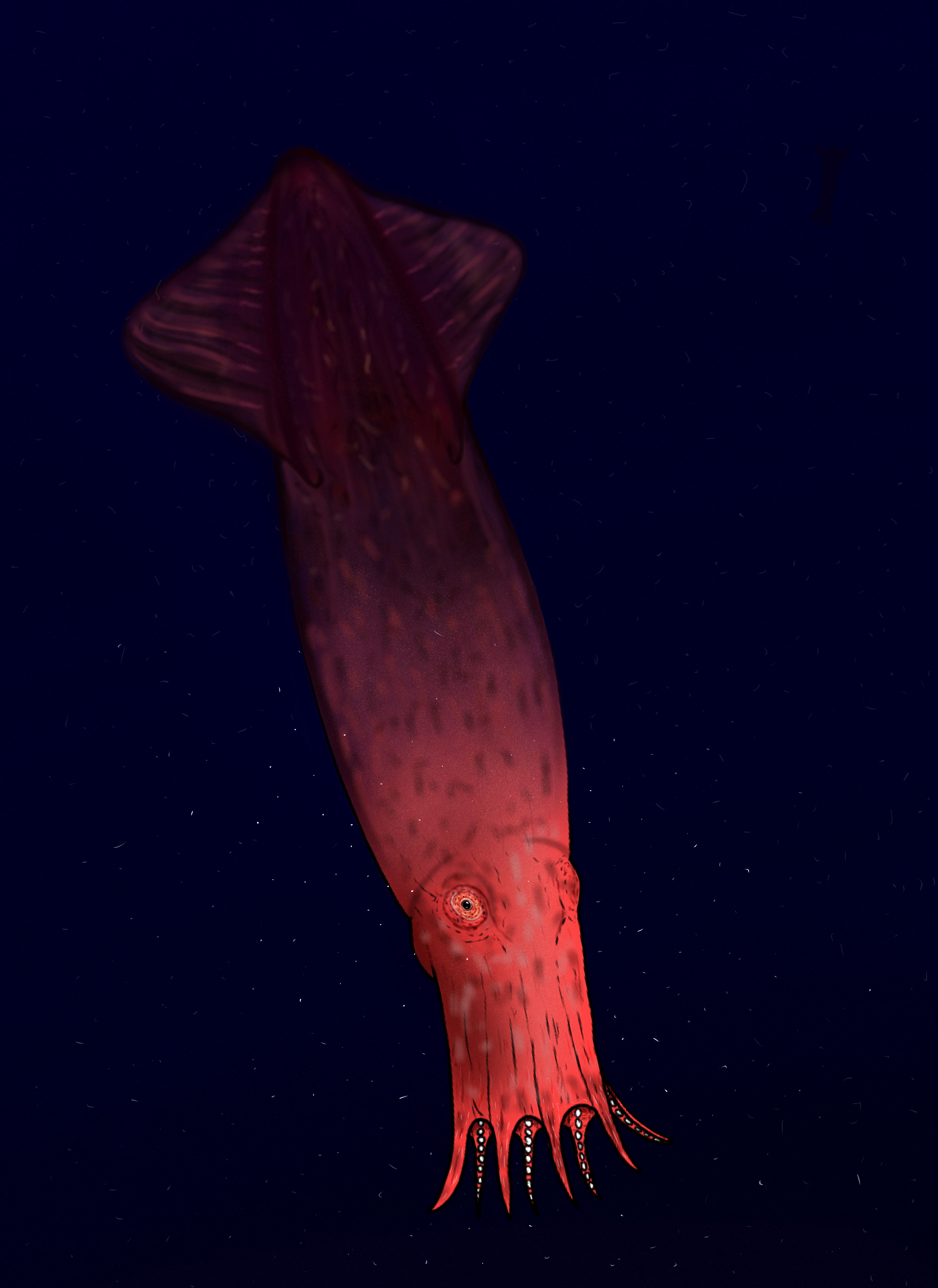
- Speculative reconstruction of Enchoteuthis melanae

Scientific classification
- Kingdom: Animalia
- Phylum: Mollusca
- Class: Cephalopoda
- Order: Octopoda
- Superfamily: †Muensterelloidea
- Family: †Muensterellidae; Roger, 1952

Subgroups
- †Listroteuthis; †Muensterella (paraphyletic); †Enchoteuthinae; †Enchoteuthis; †Niobrarateuthis; †Tusoteuthis

= Muensterellidae =

Muensterellidae Temporal range: Kimmeridgian–Campanian

Family of octopuses

Muensterellidae is a family of stem-octopod cephalopods from the Late Jurassic to Late Cretaceous.

== Phylogeny ==
Muensterellidae is one of two families in the superfamily Muensterelloidea along with the Patelloctopodidae. The muensterelloids are characterized by having a roughly spoon-shaped end of the gladius called the patella. This type of gladius is likely ancestral to the gladius remnants of modern octopuses.
