= Celaenoteuthis =

Celaenoteuthis Temporal range: Tithonian

Scientific classification
- Kingdom: Animalia
- Phylum: Mollusca
- Class: Cephalopoda
- Order: Octopoda
- Family: †Muensterellidae
- Genus: †Celaenoteuthis; Naef, 1922

Type species
- Celaenoteuthis incerta Naef, 1922

Extinct genus of molluscs

Celaenoteuthis is a genus of muensterellid stem-octopod from southern Germany. It is monotypic, with only type species C. incerta known.
