= Listroteuthis =

Listroteuthis Temporal range: Tithonian

Scientific classification
- Kingdom: Animalia
- Phylum: Mollusca
- Class: Cephalopoda
- Order: Octopoda
- Family: †Muensterellidae
- Genus: †Listroteuthis; Naef, 1922

Type species
- Celaeno conica Wagner, 1859

Synonyms
- Celaeno conica Wagner, 1859

Extinct genus of molluscs

Listroteuthis is a genus of muensterellid stem-octopod from the Mörnsheim Formation of Germany. It is monotypic, with only type species L. conica known.
