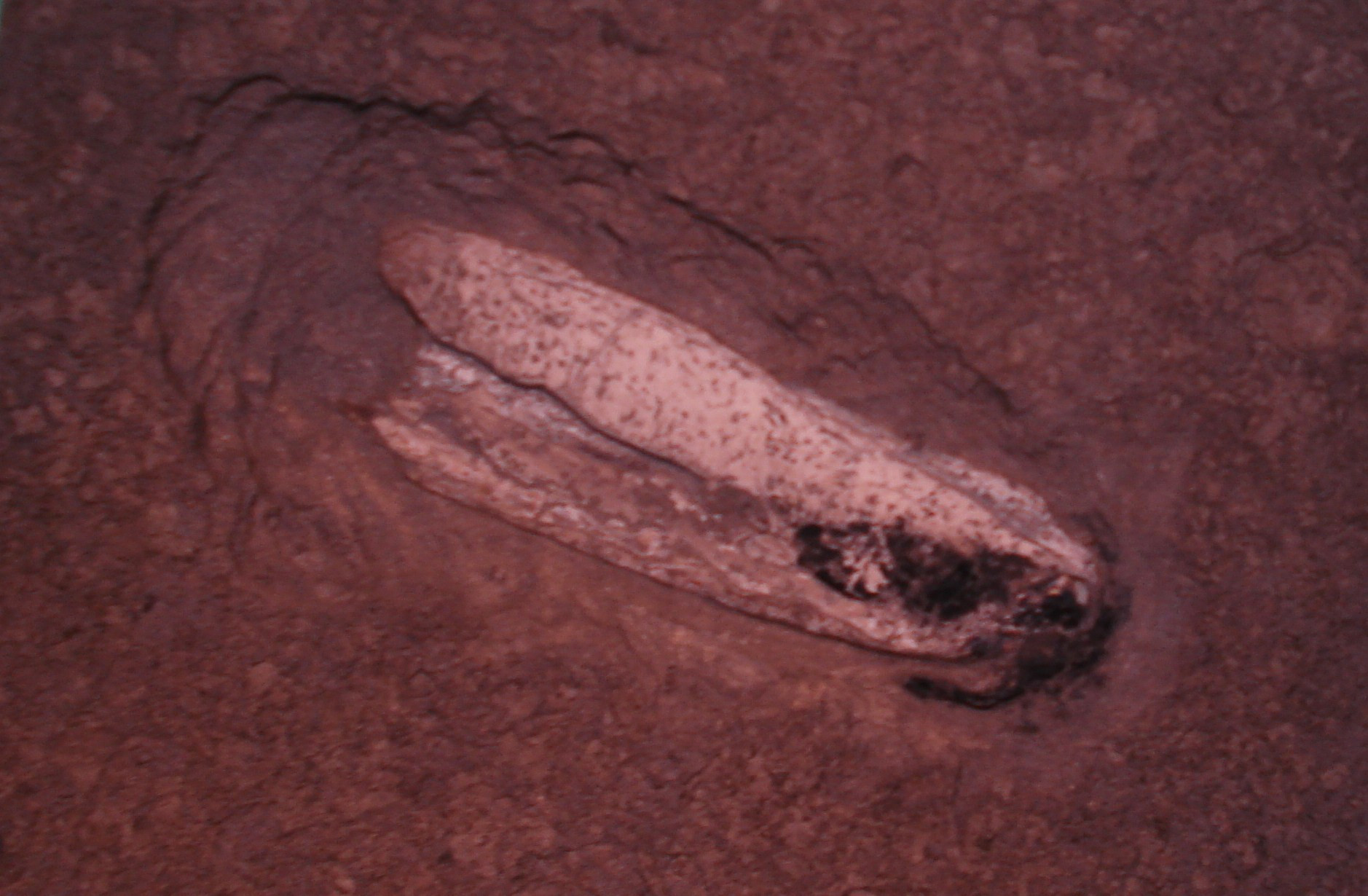
- Fossil Teudopsis

Scientific classification
- Kingdom: Animalia
- Phylum: Mollusca
- Class: Cephalopoda
- Order: Vampyromorphida
- Family: Teudopsidae
- Subfamily: Teudopseinae Naef, 1921
- Genus: Teudopsis Eudes-Deslongchamps, 1835

Species
- Teudopsis bollensis; Teudopsis bunelii; Teudopsis cadominensis; Teudopsis jeletzkyi; Teudopsis subcostata

= Teudopsis =

Genus of molluscs

Teudopsis is a genus of the coleoid cephalopod family Teudopsidae, known only from Lower Jurassic gladii. It has been reported from Alberta, Canada and Europe. During the Early Torcian period, T. bollensis, T. bunelii, and T. subcostata all inhabited European seas. The differences in the anterior median field differentiates the three species. The life appearance of Teudopsis is probably best inferred by its close relative Trachyteuthis. A fossil with soft tissue preservation shows that this animal may have had two mantle fins, which may also be the case for Teudopsis.

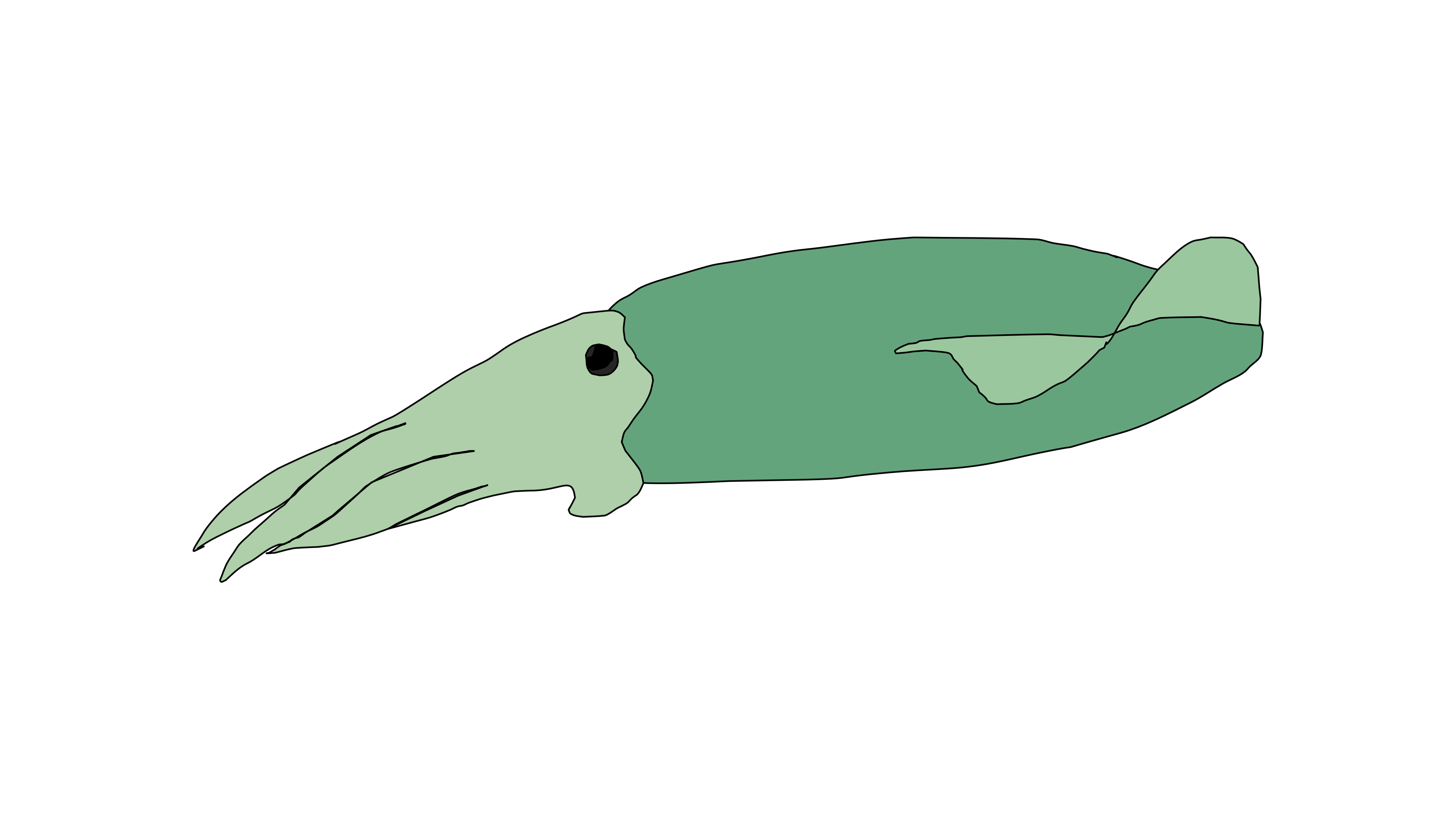
Life restoration
