= Gladius (cephalopod) =

Bodypart of certain cephalopods

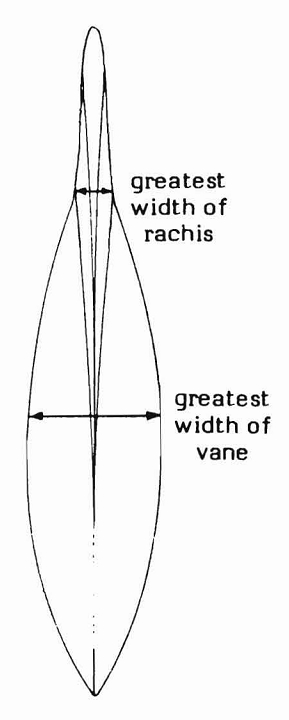
Gladius, showing measurement of rachis and vane

The gladius (pl.: gladii), or pen, is a hard internal bodypart found in many cephalopods of the superorder Decapodiformes (particularly squids) and in a single extant member of the Octopodiformes, the vampire squid (Vampyroteuthis infernalis). It is so named for its superficial resemblance to the Roman short sword of the same name, and is a vestige of the ancestral mollusc shell, which was external. The gladius is located dorsally within the mantle and usually extends for its entire length. Composed primarily of chitin, it lies within the shell sac, which is responsible for its secretion. Some species, like the bigfin reef squid, still has a gladius with some degree of mineralization.

Gladii are known from a number of extinct cephalopod groups, including teudopseids (e.g. Actinosepia, Glyphiteuthis, Muensterella, Palaeololigo, Teudopsinia, Teudopsis, and Trachyteuthis), loligosepiids (e.g. Geopeltis, Jeletzkyteuthis, and Loligosepia), and prototeuthids (e.g. Dorateuthis, Paraplesioteuthis, and Plesioteuthis).

== Morphology ==
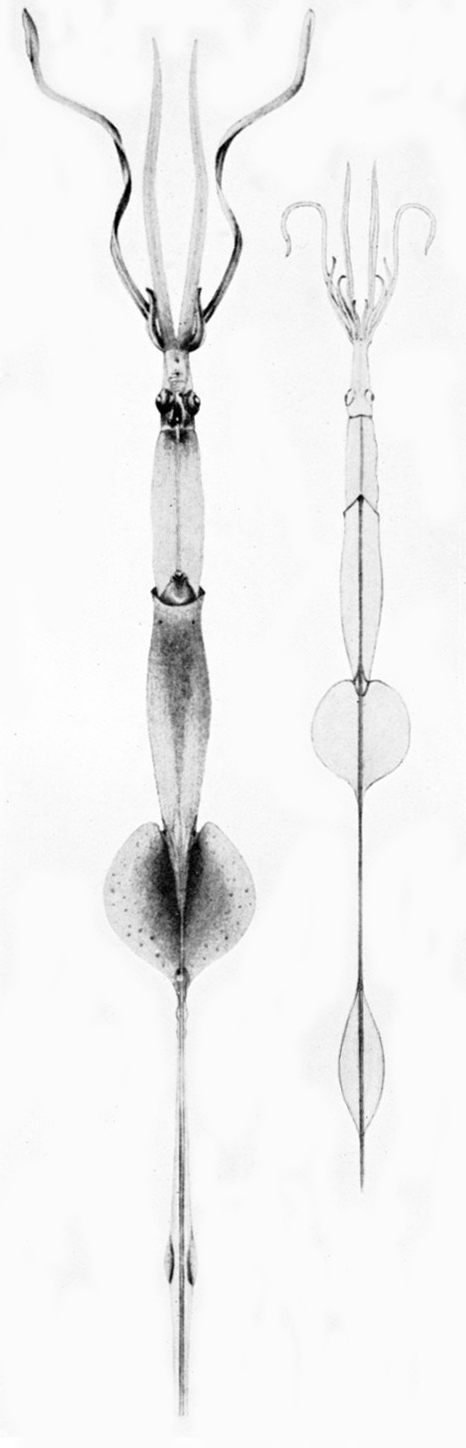
Paralarva chiroteuthids (such as the Chiroteuthis veranyi pictured) are unusual in that they possess a greatly elongated gladius extending well beyond the fins; this supports a long, trailing tail-like structure.

Gladii are shaped in many distinctive ways and vary considerably between species, though are often like a feather or leaf. The equivalent part in cuttlefish is the cuttlebone. Below are examples of gladii from various families of squid;

Shape of gladius	Species	Family
	Ancistroteuthis lichtensteini	Onychoteuthidae
	Architeuthis sp.	Architeuthidae
	Bathyteuthis abyssicola	Bathyteuthidae
	Histioteuthis bonnellii	Histioteuthidae
	Histioteuthis reversa	Histioteuthidae
	Illex illecebrosus	Ommastrephidae
	Lepidoteuthis grimaldii	Lepidoteuthidae
	Doryteuthis pealeii	Loliginidae
	Loliolus sumatrensis	Loliginidae
	Lolliguncula brevis	Loliginidae
	Mastigoteuthis agassizii	Mastigoteuthidae
	Onykia ingens	Onychoteuthidae
	Pholidoteuthis massyae	Pholidoteuthidae
	Sepioteuthis lessoniana	Loliginidae
	Taningia danae	Octopoteuthidae
	Taonius borealis	Cranchiidae
	Teuthowenia megalops	Cranchiidae
	Uroteuthis duvauceli	Loliginidae

Fossilized gladii

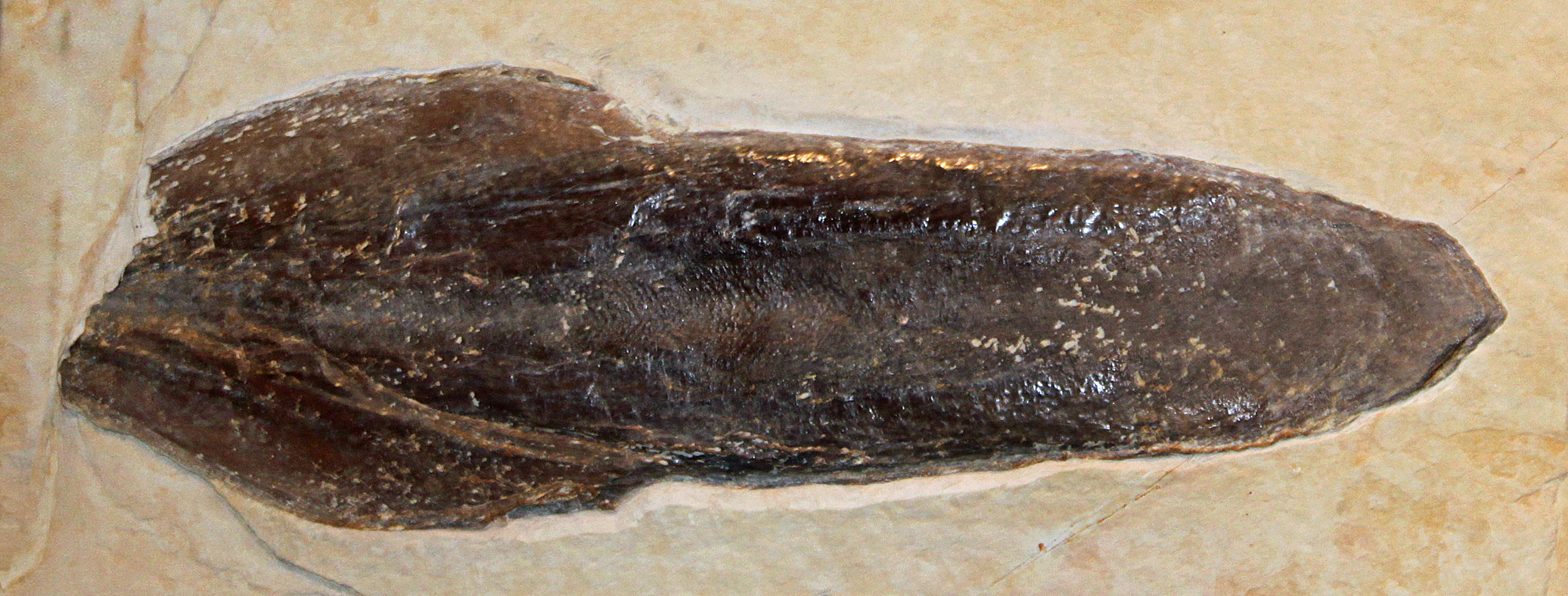
Trachyteuthis

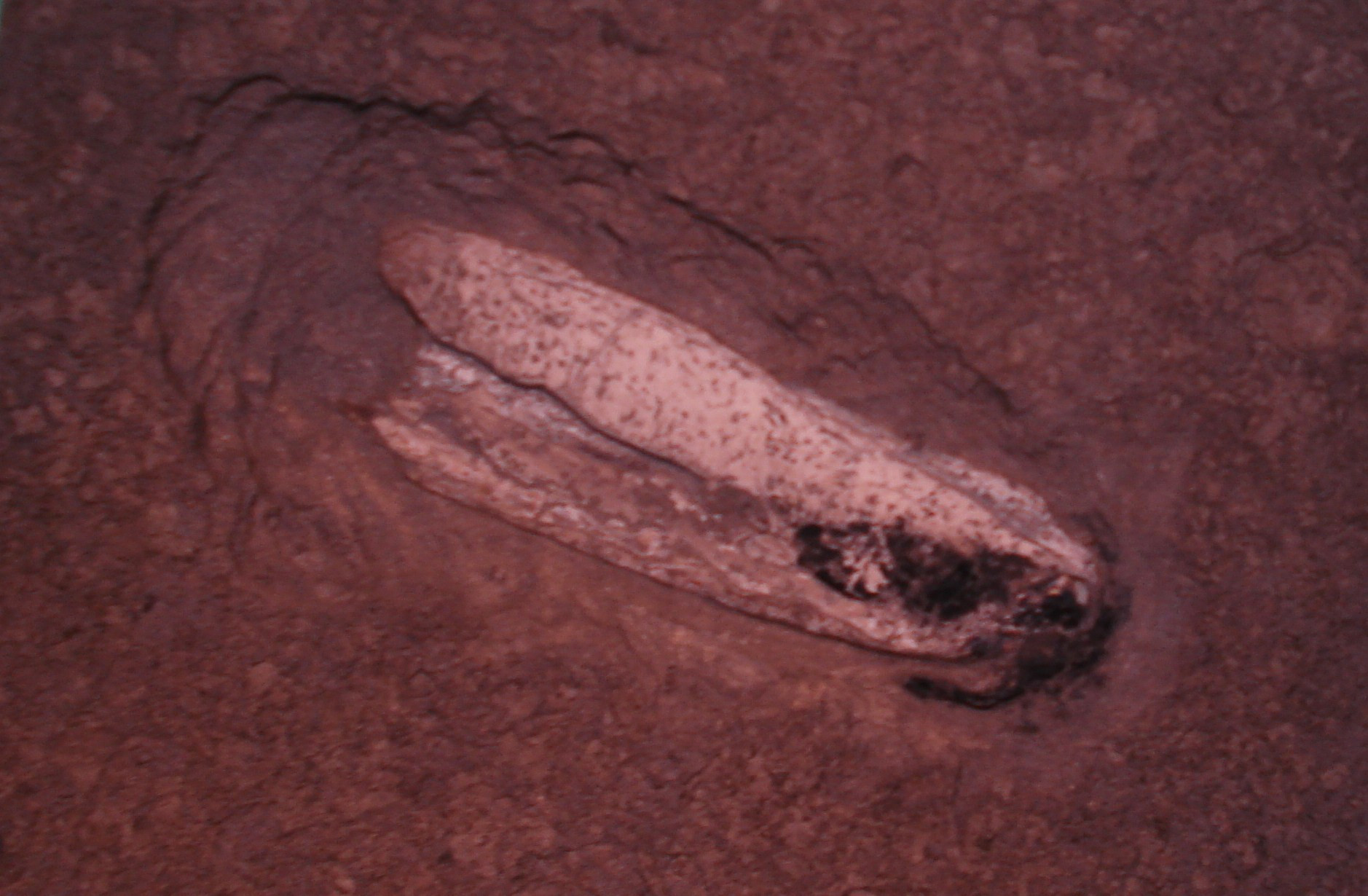
Teudopsis

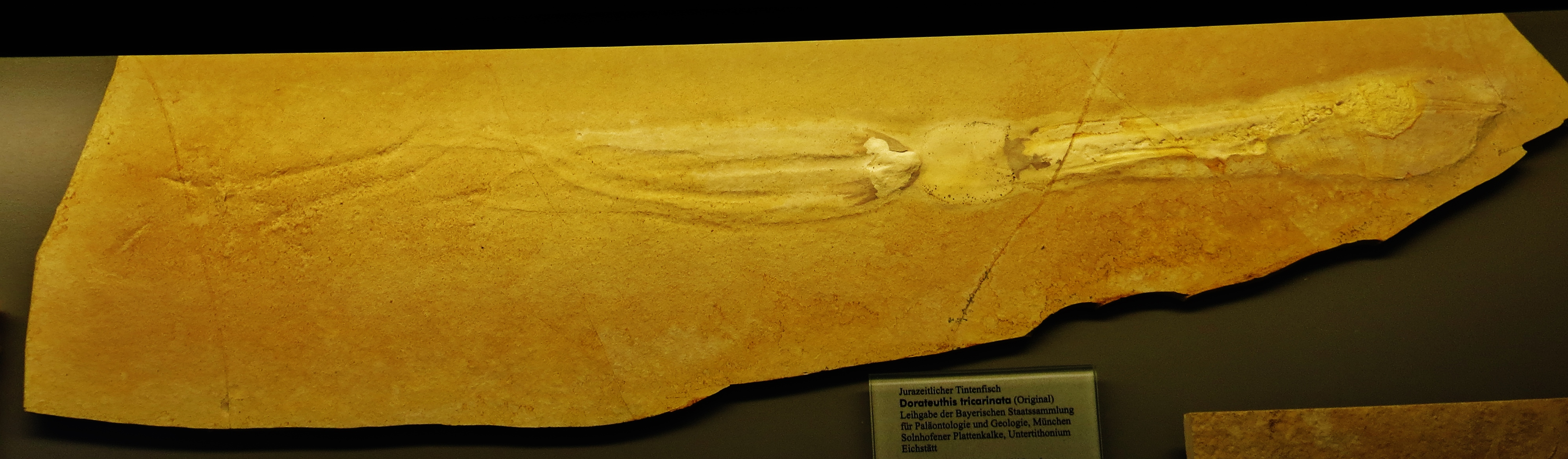
Dorateuthis full-body fossil, head facing left

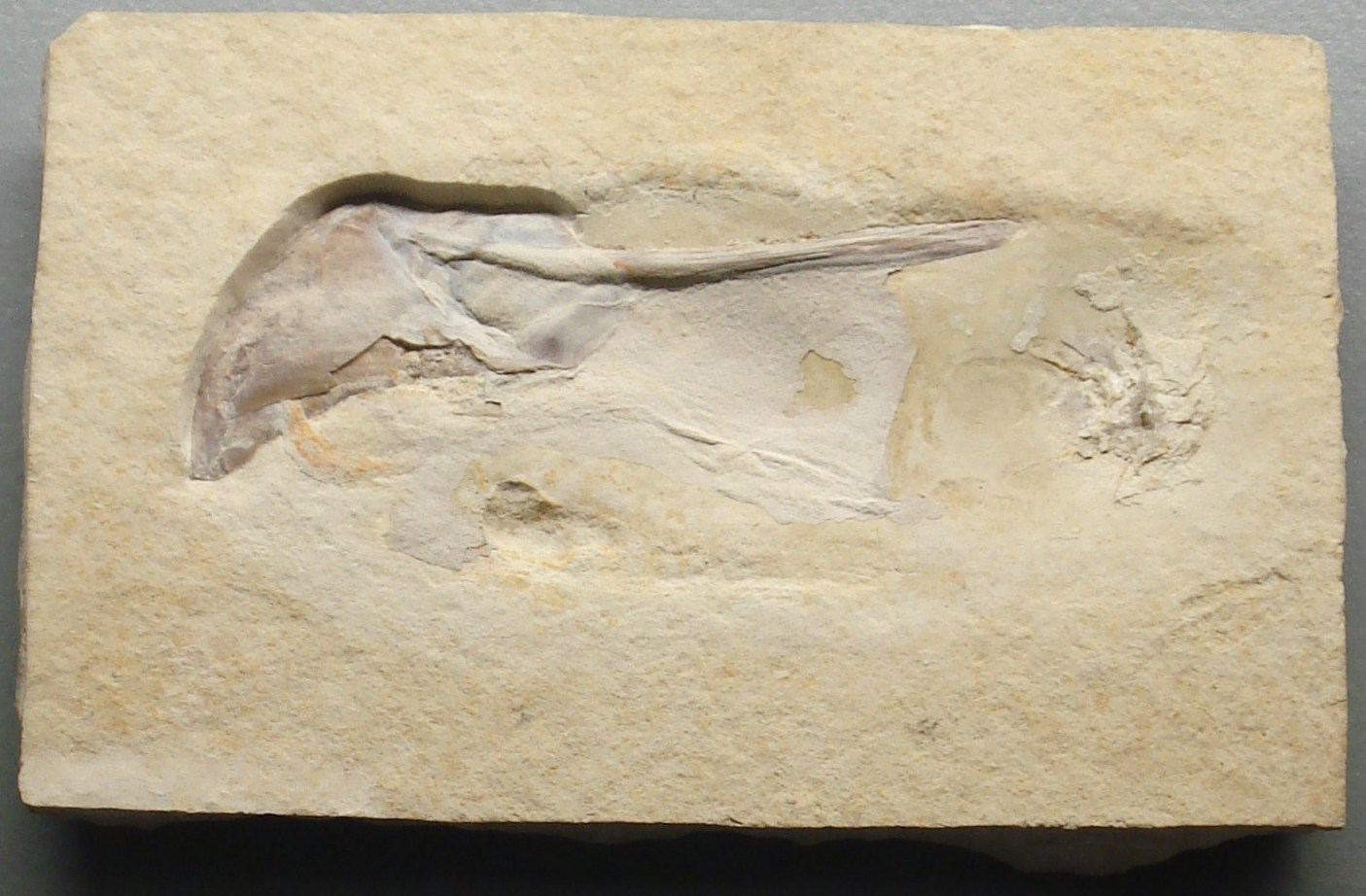
Muensterella

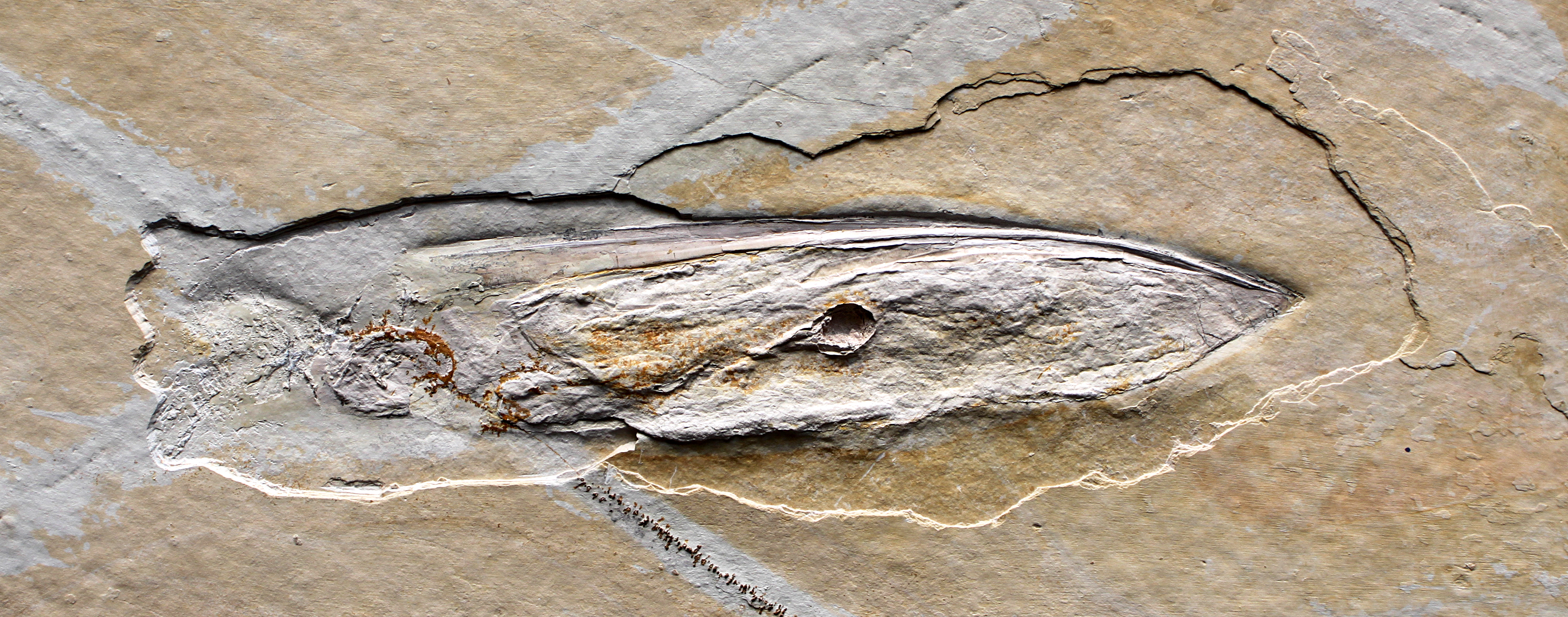
Plesioteuthis

== See also ==
- Cuttlebone
- Belemnoidea
- Argonaut
- Nautilus
- Spirula
- Mollusc shell
