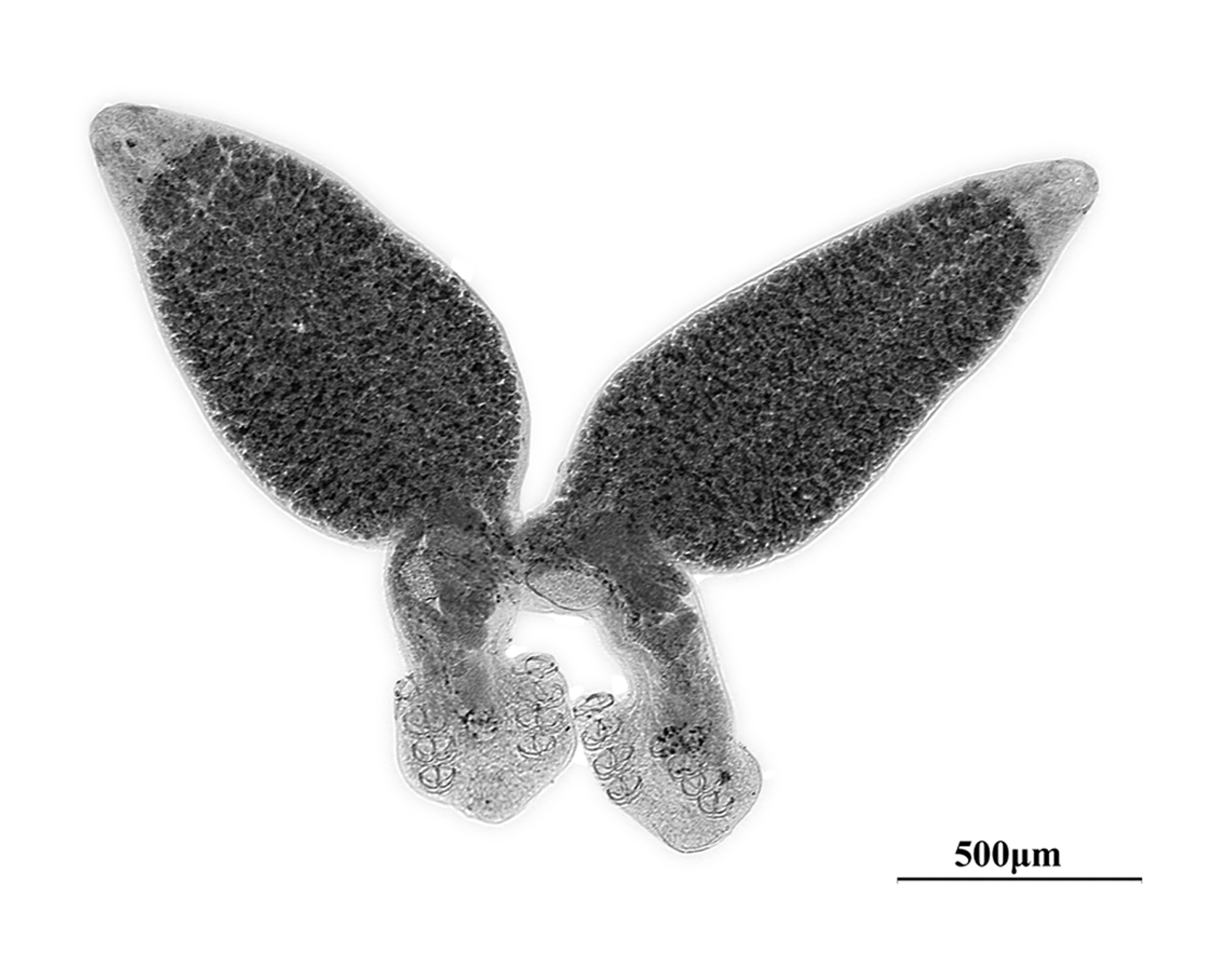
- Paradiplozoon yunnanense

Scientific classification
- Kingdom: Animalia
- Phylum: Platyhelminthes
- Class: Monogenea
- Order: Mazocraeidea
- Family: Diplozoidae
- Genus: Paradiplozoon
- Species: P. yunnanense

Binomial name
- Paradiplozoon yunnanense Fan, Meng, Bai, Xu & Wang, 2018

= Paradiplozoon yunnanense =

Species of flatworm

Paradiplozoon yunnanense is a species of monogenean of the family Diplozoidae. As in all species of this family, the bodies of the two hermaphroditic members of a couple are permanently fused for life.

This monogenean is a parasite of the gills of the cyprinid Sikukia gudgeri in China, in the Jinghong Basin, a tributary of the Lancong-Mekong River. The species is distinguished from congeners by a combination of morphological and molecular features.

The species was described under the name Paradiplozoon yunnanensis but the correct spelling is yunnanense since Paradiplozoon is neuter.

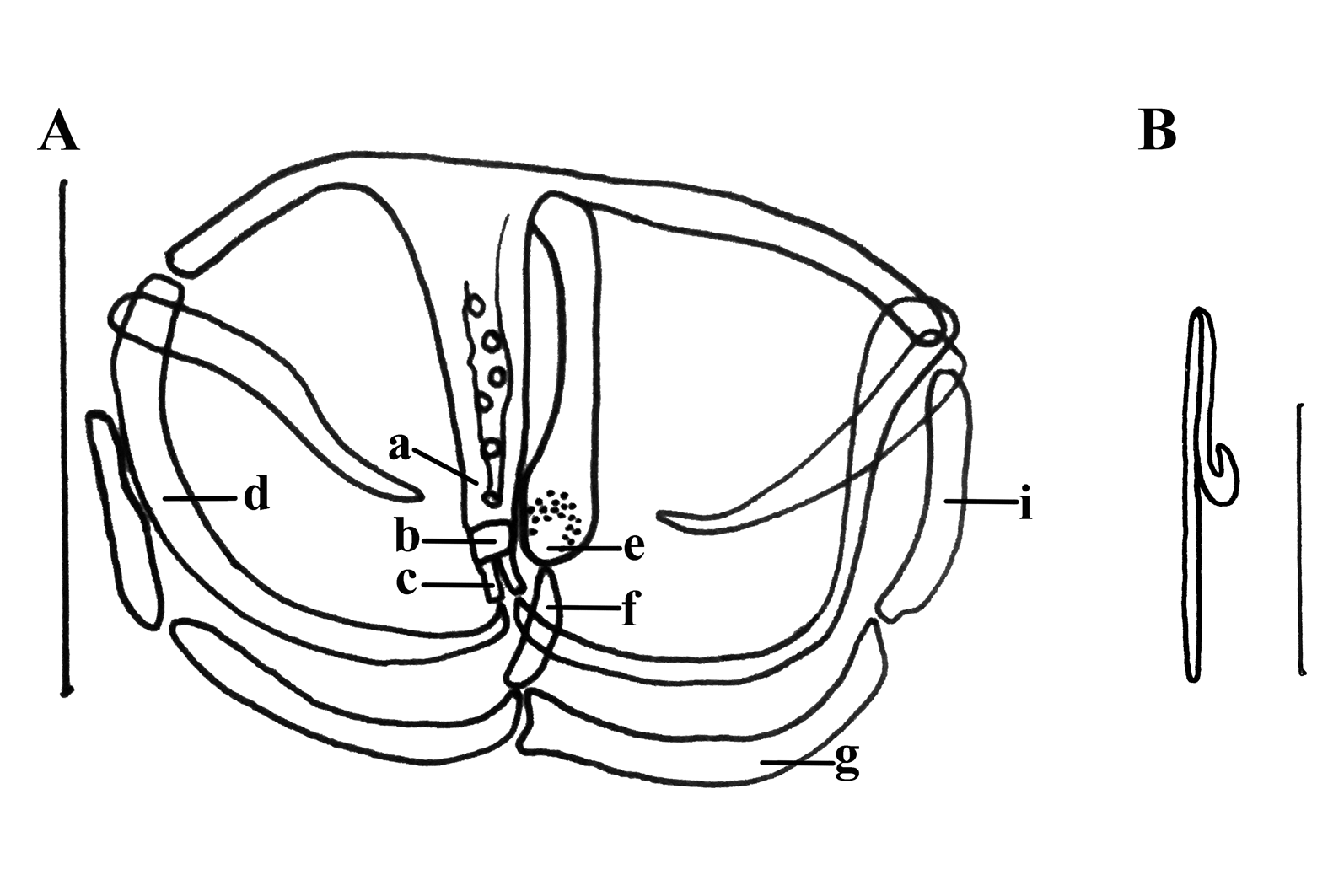
The sclerites in the haptor of Paradiplozoon yunnanense
