= Paradiclybothrium =

Scientific classification
- Kingdom: Animalia
- Phylum: Platyhelminthes
- Class: Monogenea
- Order: Diclybothriidea
- Family: Diclybothriidae
- Genus: Paradiclybothrium; Bychowski & Gusev, 1950
- Species: P. pacificum

Binomial name
- Paradiclybothrium pacificum Bychowski & Gusev, 1950

Genus of flatworms

Paradiclybothrium is a genus of monogeneans in the family Diclybothriidae. It consists of one species, Paradiclybothrium pacificum.
