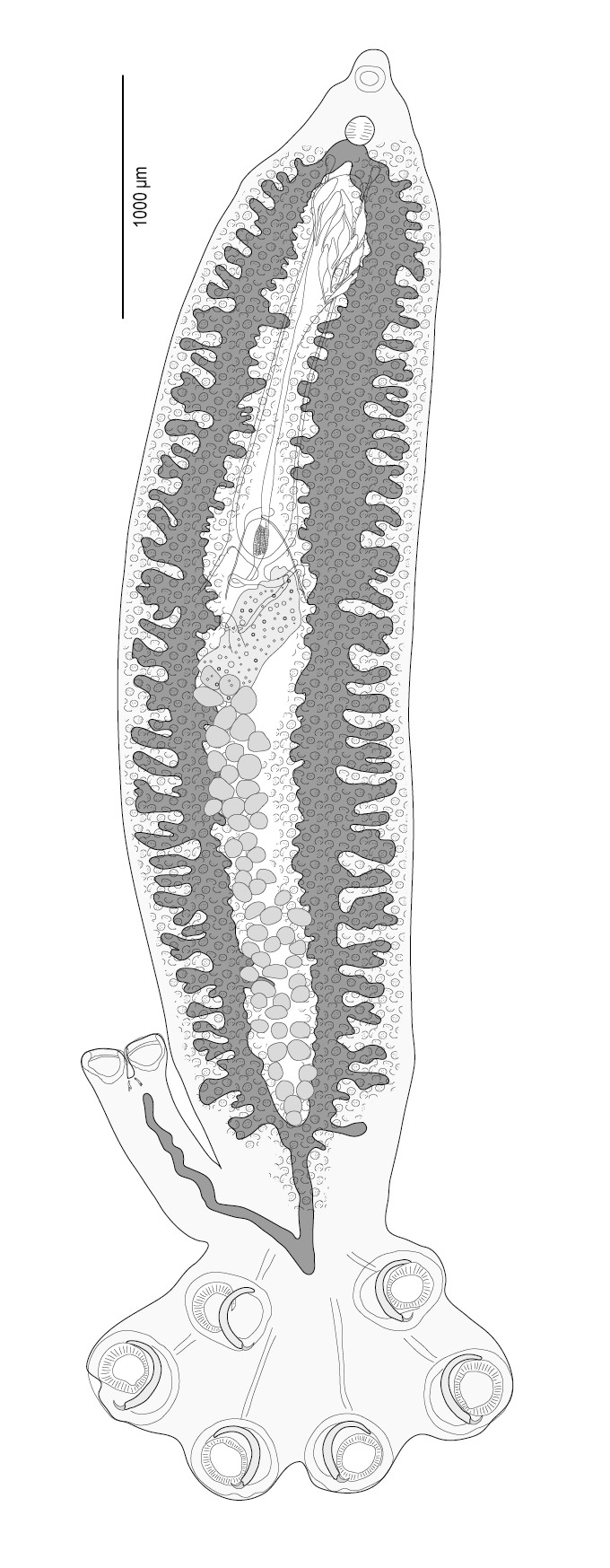
- Protocotyle euzetmaillardi Justine, 2011

Scientific classification
- Kingdom: Animalia
- Phylum: Platyhelminthes
- Class: Monogenea
- Order: Diclybothriidea
- Family: Hexabothriidae
- Genus: Protocotyle; Euzet & Maillard, 1974

Type species
- Protocotyle taschenbergi (Maillard & Oliver, 1966) Euzet & Maillard, 1974

Species
- See text

= Protocotyle =

Genus of flatworms

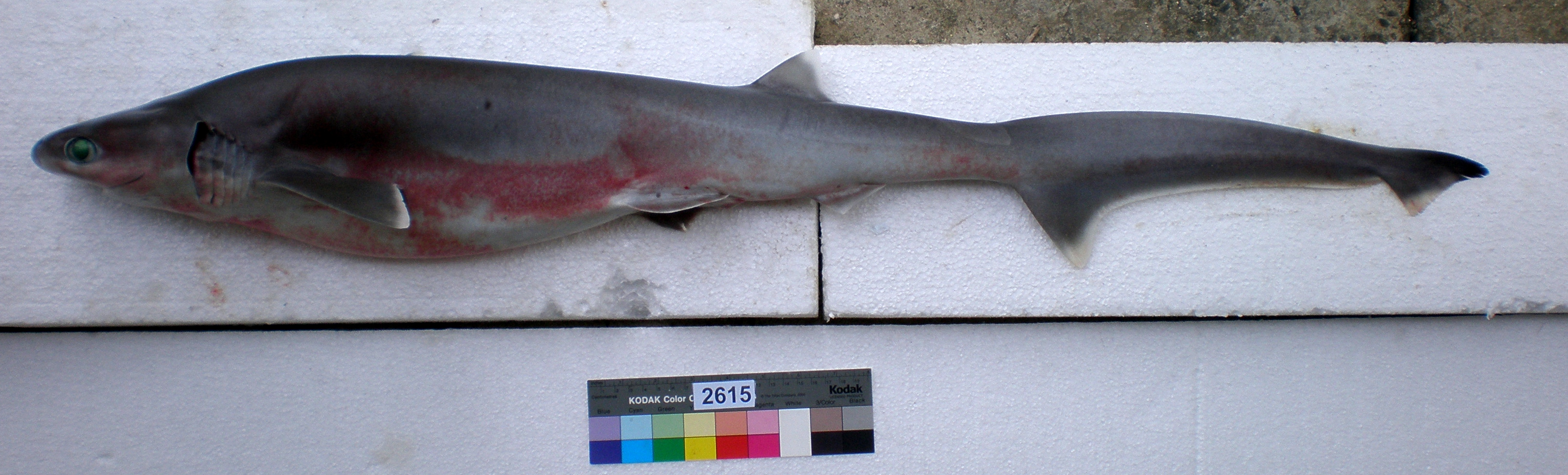
Sixgill sharks, such as Hexanchus nakamurai here, are hosts of species of Protocotyle

Protocotyle is a genus of monogeneans in the family Hexabothriidae. The genus was created by Louis Euzet and Claude Maillard in 1974.

Protocotyle includes only three species, which are all parasitic on the gills of sharks of the genus Hexanchus, namely Hexanchus griseus and Hexanchus nakamurai. The species are:

- Protocotyle euzetmaillardi Justine, 2011
- Protocotyle grisea (Cerfontaine, 1899) Euzet & Maillard, 1974
- Protocotyle taschenbergi (Maillard & Oliver, 1966) Euzet & Maillard, 1974
