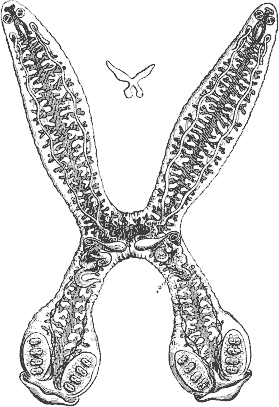
- Diplozoon paradoxum

Scientific classification
- Kingdom: Animalia
- Phylum: Platyhelminthes
- Class: Monogenea
- Order: Mazocraeidea
- Family: Diplozoidae
- Genus: Diplozoon von Nordmann, 1832

= Diplozoon =

Genus of flatworms

Diplozoon is a genus of flatworms belonging to the family Diplozoidae.

The species of this genus are found in Europe.

Species:

- Diplozoon bileki Kritscher, 1991
- Diplozoon kashmirensis Kaw, 1950
- Diplozoon paradoxum von Nordmann, 1832
