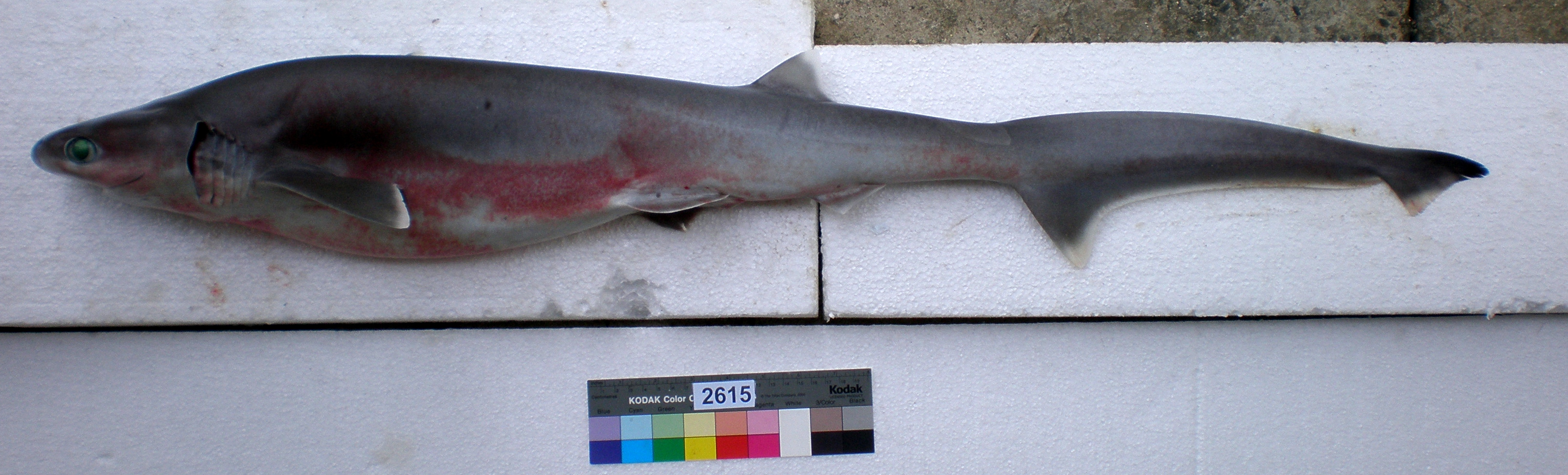

Conservation status
- Near Threatened (IUCN 3.1)

Scientific classification
- Kingdom: Animalia
- Phylum: Chordata
- Class: Chondrichthyes
- Subclass: Elasmobranchii
- Division: Selachii
- Order: Hexanchiformes
- Family: Hexanchidae
- Genus: Hexanchus
- Species: H. nakamurai

Binomial name
- Hexanchus nakamurai (Teng, 1962)
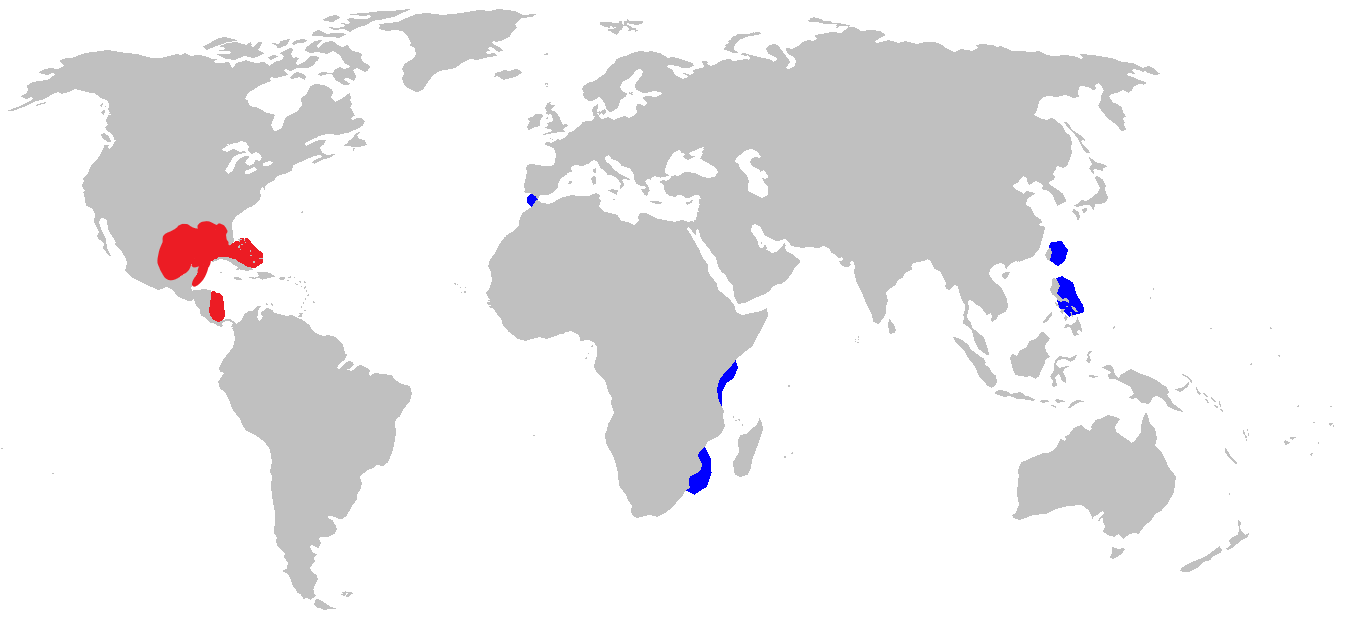
- Distribution of Hexanchus nakamurai (blue) and Hexanchus vitulus (red)

= Bigeyed sixgill shark =

Species of shark

The bigeyed sixgill shark (Hexanchus nakamurai) is a cow shark of the family Hexanchidae. Its dorsal surface has a brownish-gray color, and is sharply separated from the light coloring of its ventral surface. The eyes are a fluorescent green while the shark is alive. The body of this shark is small, slim, and fusiform in shape. As the name suggests, this shark has six gill slits, unusual among most shark species. The head is narrow and somewhat flattened, and the mouth contains 5 rows of large, comb-shaped teeth. This shark's single dorsal fin is pushed back towards the caudal fin, and is behind the pelvic fins. The upper caudal fin is much longer than the lower, with a deep notch near the tip. All fins have thin white margins on the edge. In juveniles, the upper caudal fin has a black tip.

== Measurements ==
Length at birth for this species is 34–45 cm; adults average 1.2 m for both sexes, with a maximum of 1.8 m. Mature adults weigh around 20 kg.

== Range and habitat ==
Bigeyed sixgills are found in the Indian Ocean and the western Pacific Ocean. Populations in the western Atlantic Ocean formerly grouped within this species are now considered their own species, the Atlantic sixgill shark (Hexanchus vitulus). These sharks live near the sea floor between 90 and 600 m deep, but may move closer to the surface at night to take advantage of prey there. They make their home on continental shelves, insular shelves, and upper slopes. These sharks do not inhabit abyssal environments.

== Parasites ==
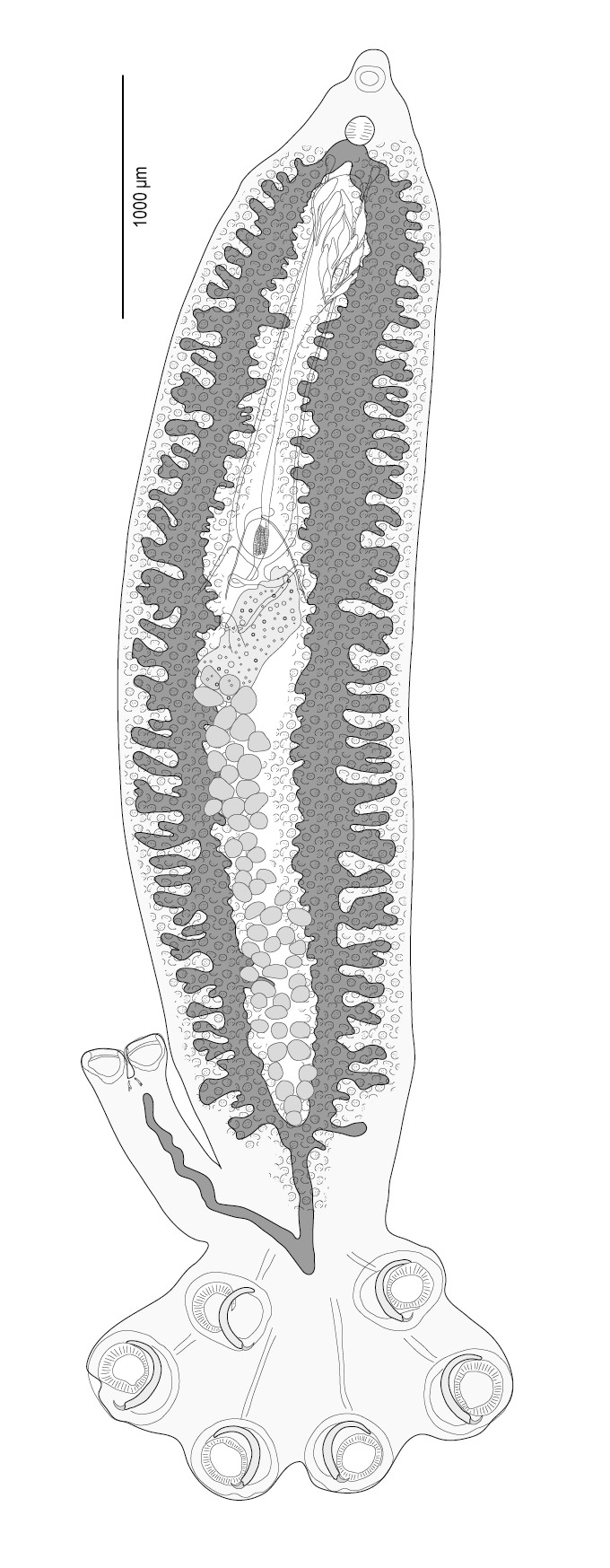
Protocotyle euzetmaillardi

As with other sharks, bigeyed sixgill sharks harbour a number of parasite species. Monogeneans of the genus Protocotyle (family Hexabothriidae) have been found only on the gills of species of Hexanchus. The species Protocotyle euzetmaillardi Justine, 2011 was recently described from the gills of Hexanchus nakamurai off New Caledonia, South Pacific Ocean.

== Behavior ==
Little is known about the feeding habits of the bigeyed sixgill. Based on the few stomach examinations of these sharks, they are thought to feed mainly on small to moderately sized bony fish and bottom dwelling crustaceans. Like all sharks of the order Hexanchiformes found so far, this shark is ovoviviparous, meaning the eggs are retained inside the female's body until hatching. The bigeyed sixgill, after an unknown gestation period, gives birth to litters of up to 13 pups.

== Conservation ==
The bigeyed sixgill is listed as near threatened by the IUCN Red List. Based on what little is known of the species, these sharks are not suffering major declines to their population, but pressure is growing from deepwater fisheries. According to the International Shark Attack File, the bigeyed sixgill is harmless, as its natural environment is far from people, and no attacks on humans by the species have been reported.

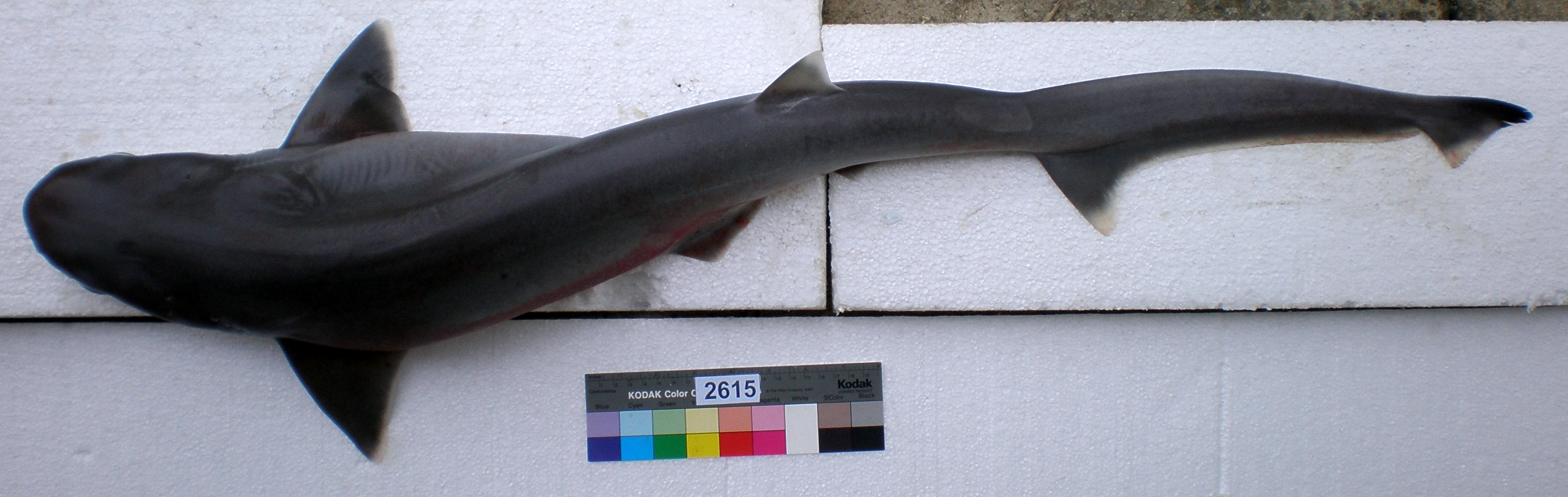

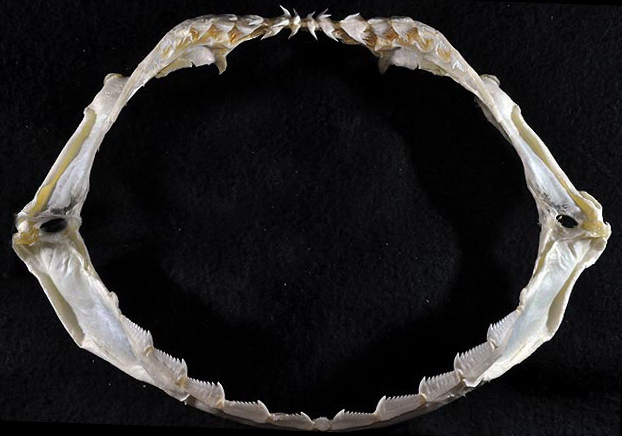
Jaws

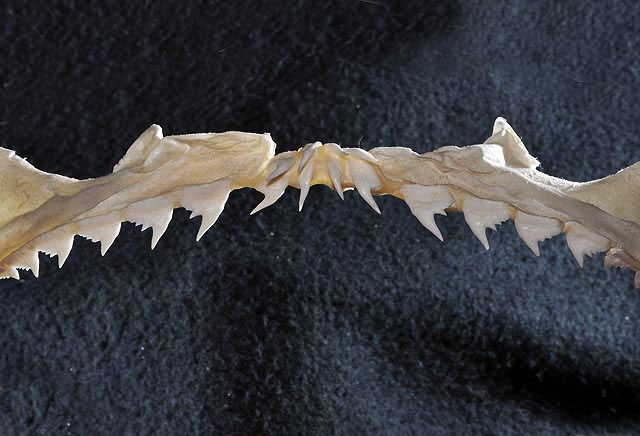
Upper teeth

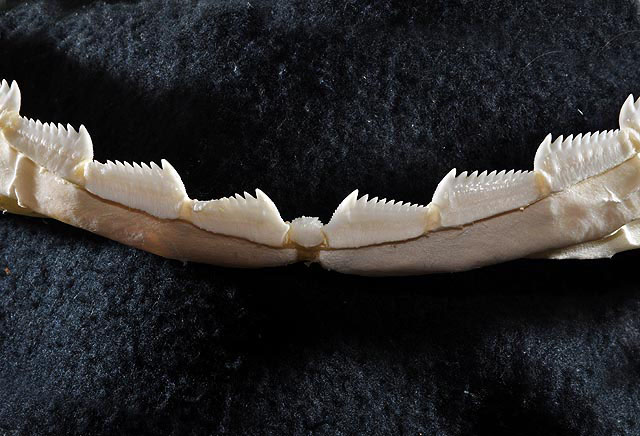
Lower teeth

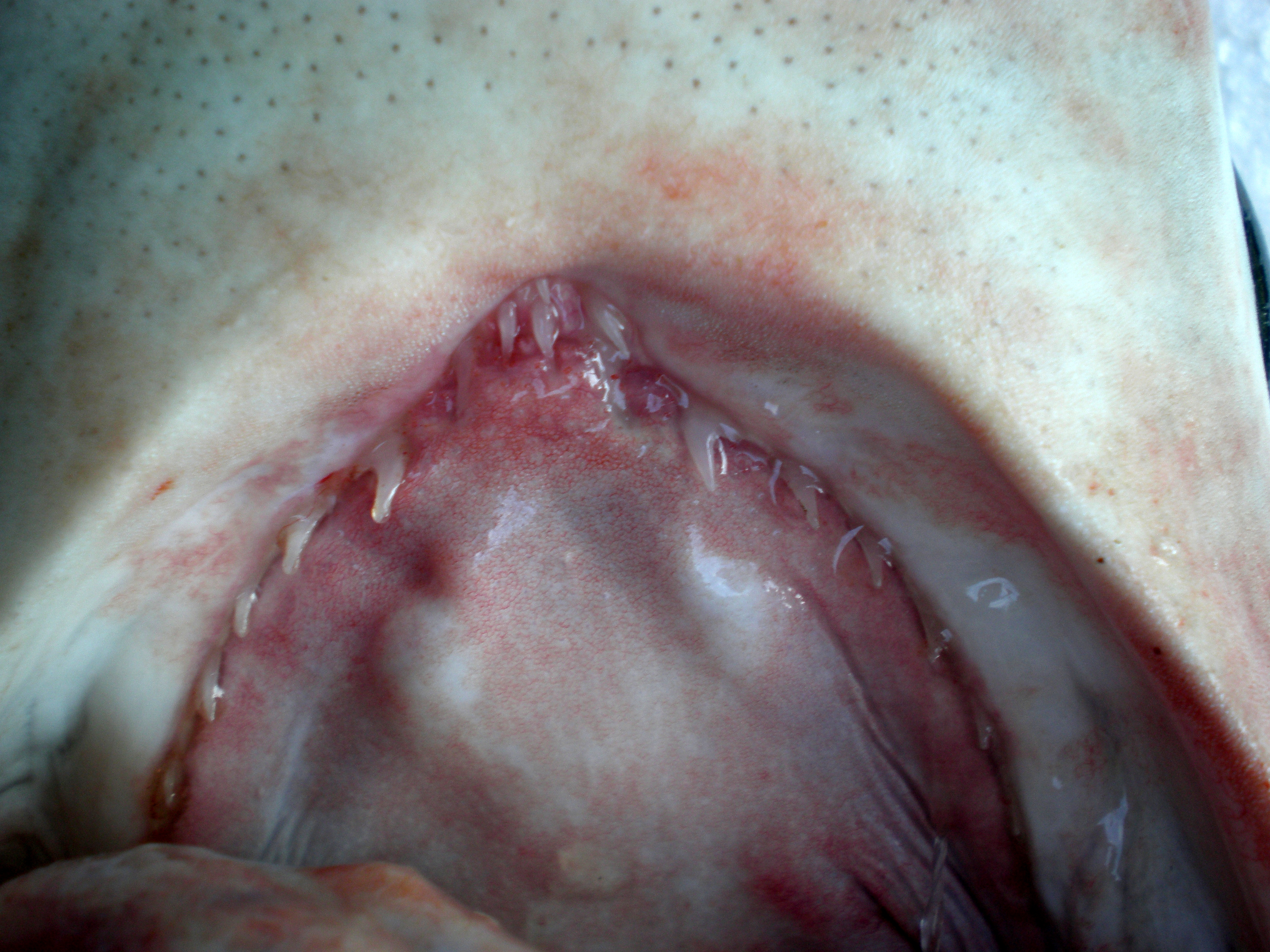
H. nakamurai, upper teeth

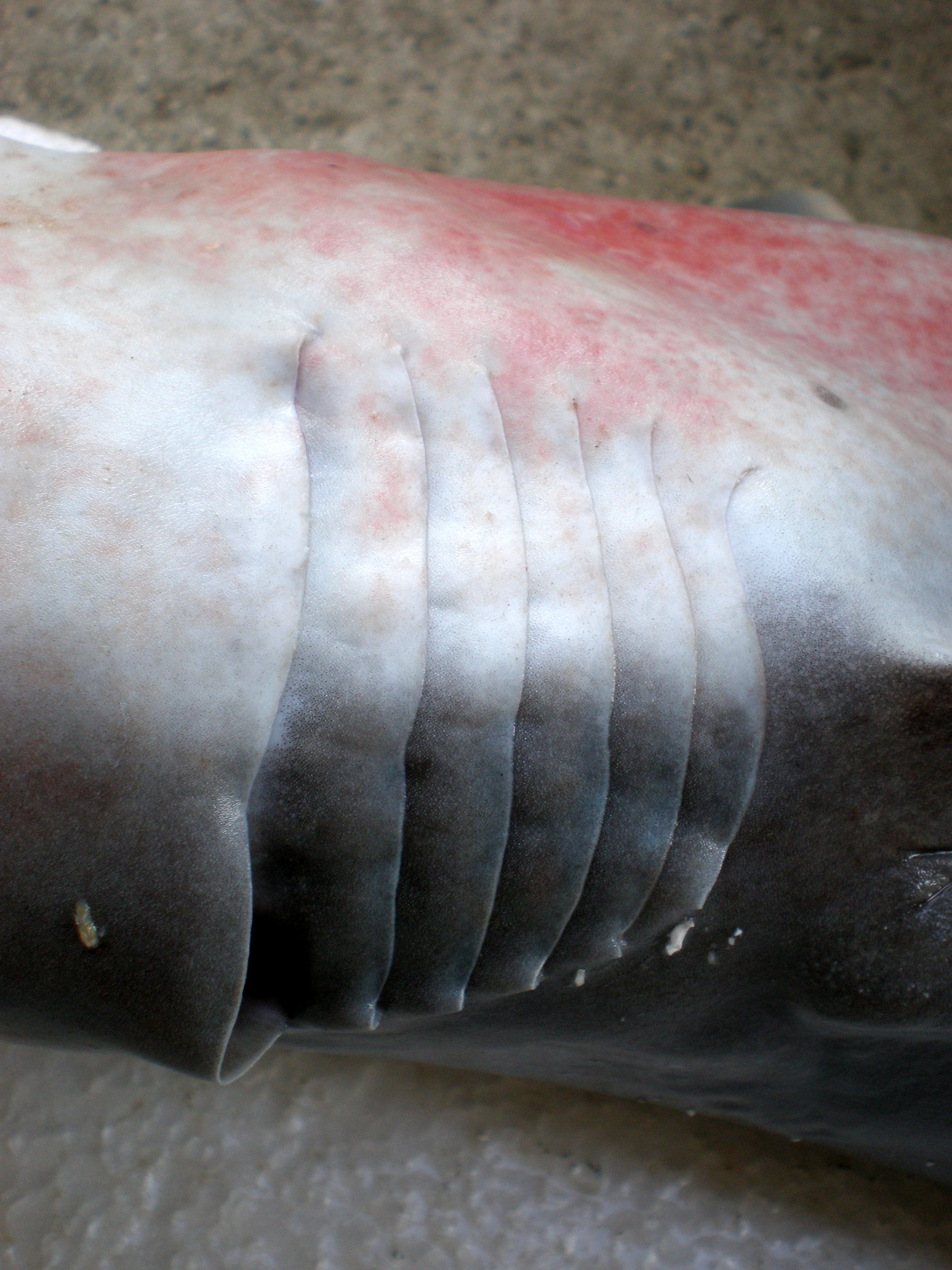
H. nakamurai, six gill openings

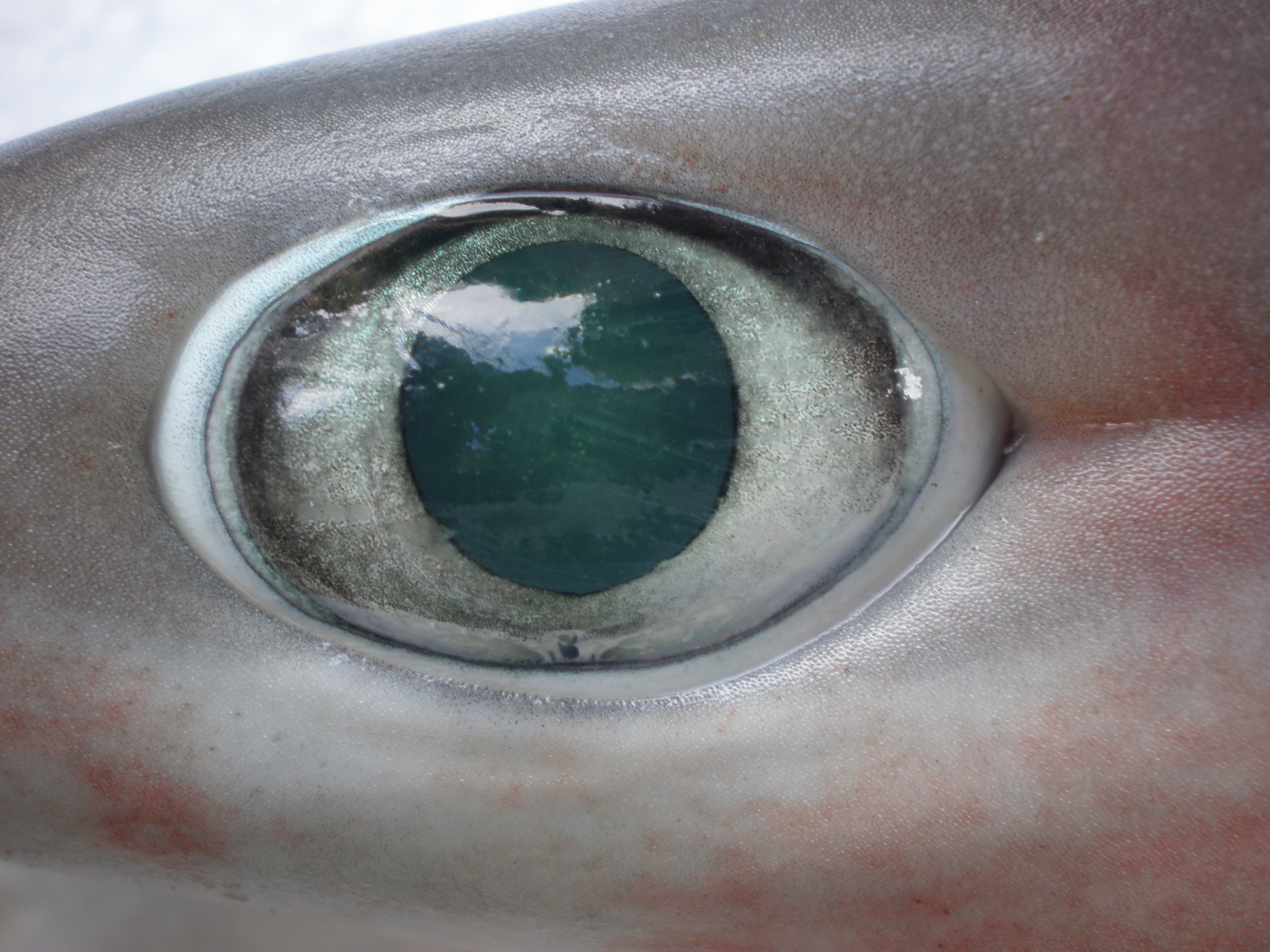
H. nakamurai, eye

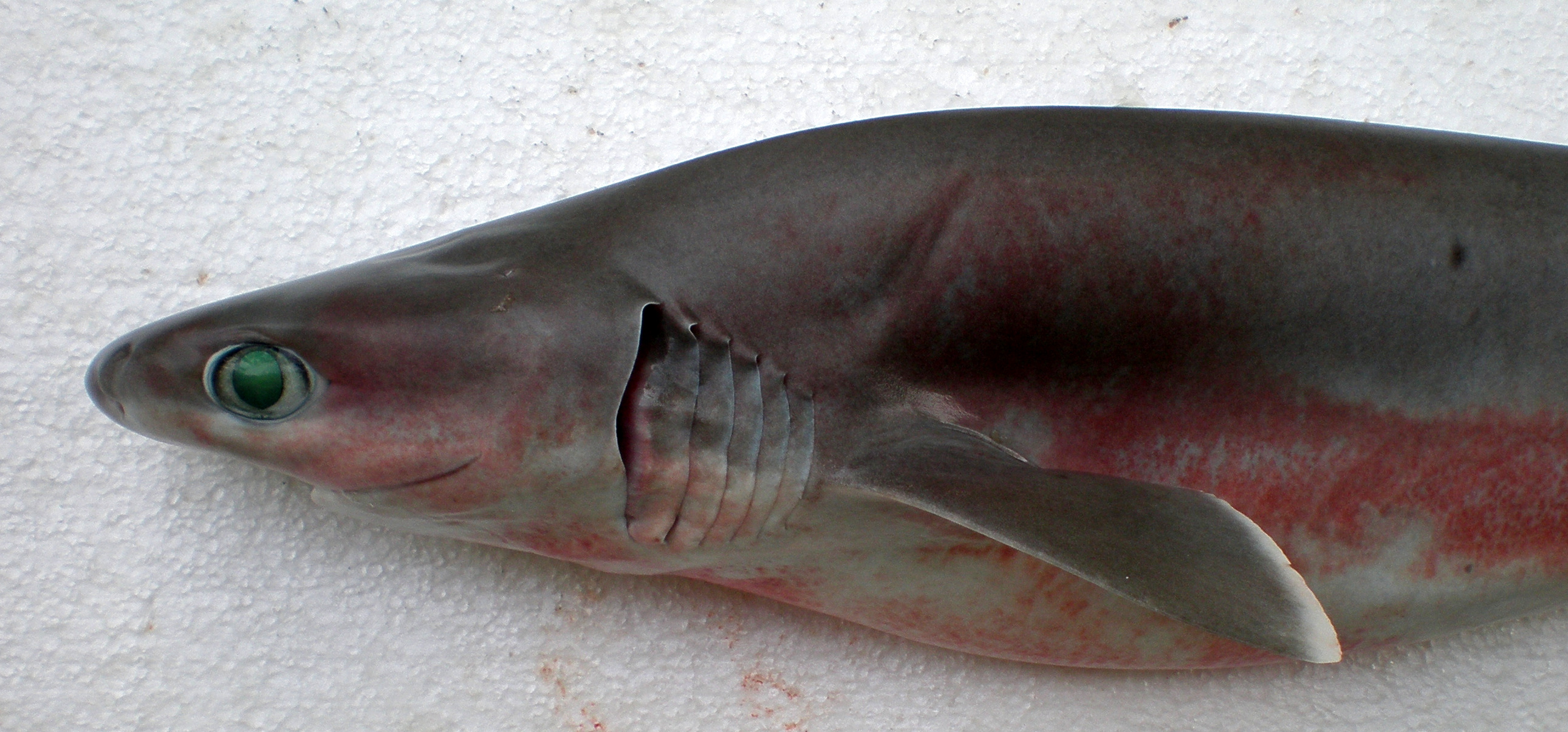
Front part of body

== See also ==
- List of sharks
- Hexanchidae
- Hexanchiformes
