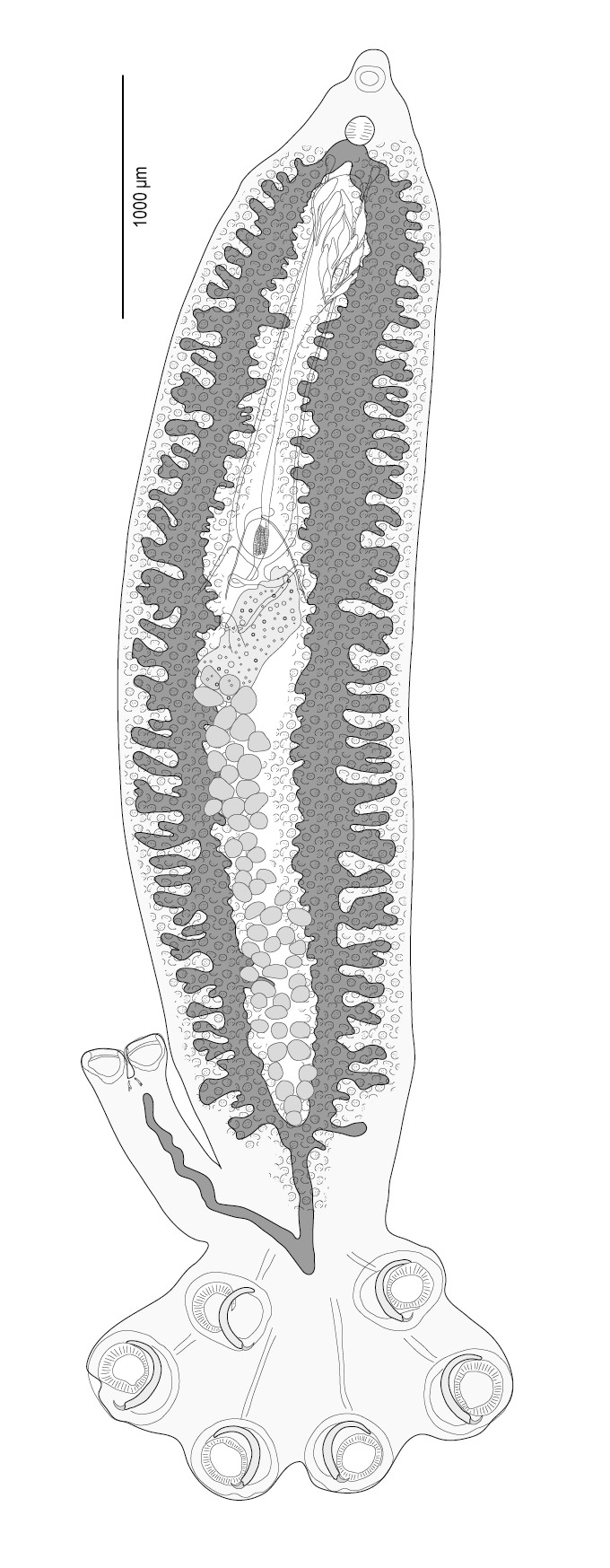
- Protocotyle euzetmaillardi

Scientific classification
- Kingdom: Animalia
- Phylum: Platyhelminthes
- Class: Monogenea
- Order: Diclybothriidea
- Family: Hexabothriidae
- Genus: Protocotyle
- Species: P. euzetmaillardi

Binomial name
- Protocotyle euzetmaillardi Justine, 2011

= Protocotyle euzetmaillardi =

Species of flatworm

Protocotyle euzetmaillardi is a species of monogenean of the family Hexabothriidae.

It is the third described species of the genus Protocotyle, after Protocotyle grisea (Cerfontaine, 1899) Euzet & Maillard, 1974 and Protocotyle taschenbergi (Maillard & Oliver, 1966) Euzet & Maillard, 1974.

The body is 4.5-6.1 millimetres in length, elongate, and it includes, like all monogeneans, a posterior attachment organ called haptor. The haptor is symmetrical, armed with six suckers, each provided with one hook-shaped sclerite, and there is a lateral appendix bearing a single pair of terminal suckers and a single pair of hooks (also called hamuli). There is a single ovary, located at mid-length of the body, and numerous testes, more posterior. The oötype wall has longitudinal rows of large cells (a structure called "ootype côtelé" by Euzet & Maillard, 1974). The eggs are elongate, fusiform, with a single terminal filament.

The species is distinguished from other species of the genus Protocotyle by the following combination of characters: posterior lobe of seminal vesicle absent, diverticulum of oviduct present, and small body size.

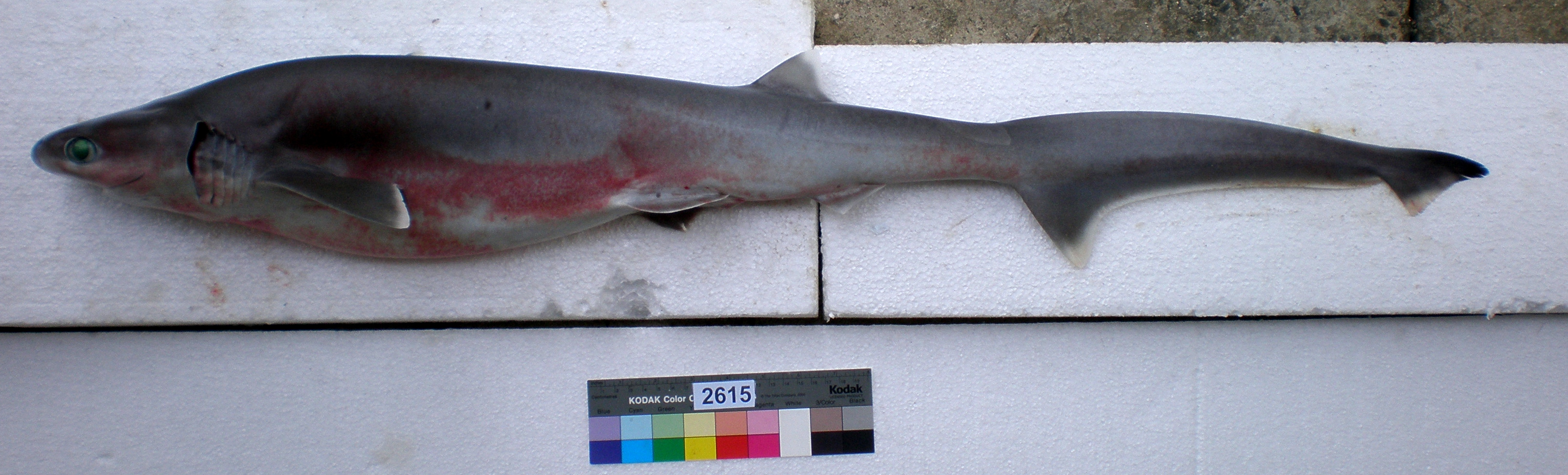
The individual of bigeyed sixgill shark (Hexanchus nakamurai) in which Protocotyle euzetmaillardi was discovered

It is ectoparasite on the gills of a deep-sea fish, the bigeyed sixgill shark Hexanchus nakamurai. It has been found off New Caledonia, in the South Pacific Ocean on a single shark in 2008 and never found again since. It is the single species of monogenean known from this shark. Both other species of Protocotyle are parasitic on the gills of the bluntnose sixgill shark Hexanchus griseus; thus, species of Protocotyle seem to be restricted to species of Hexanchus.

The name of the species, euzetmaillardi, means that it was named in honour of both Professor Louis Euzet, a famous French parasitologist, and Claude Maillard, a collaborator of Professor Louis Euzet, both authors of a major work about hexabothriids.
