= Diclybothrium =

Scientific classification
- Kingdom: Animalia
- Phylum: Platyhelminthes
- Class: Monogenea
- Order: Diclybothriidea
- Family: Diclybothriidae
- Genus: Diclybothrium; Leuckart, 1835

Genus of flatworms

Diclybothrium is a genus of monogeneans in the family Diclybothriidae. It consists of one species, Diclybothrium armatum Leuckart, 1835.
