= Hemiculter elongatus =

Conservation status
- Data Deficient (IUCN 3.1)

Scientific classification
- Kingdom: Animalia
- Phylum: Chordata
- Class: Actinopterygii
- Division: Teleostei
- Order: Cypriniformes
- Suborder: Cyprinoidei
- Family: Xenocyprididae
- Genus: Hemiculter
- Species: H. elongatus

Binomial name
- Hemiculter elongatus V. H. Nguyễn & S. V. Ngô, 2001

Species of fish

Hemiculter elongatus is a tropical freshwater fish belonging to the family Xenocyprididae. It is known only from the Ky Cùng River in Lang Son Province, northern Vietnam. It was originally described by Nguyen & Ngo in 2001.
