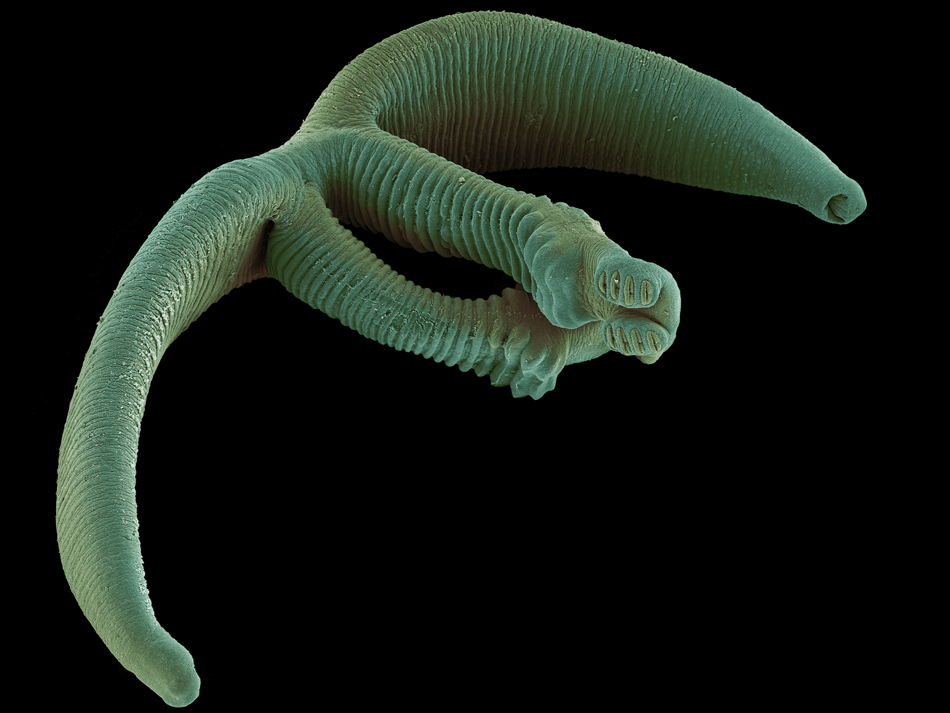
- Eudiplozoon nipponicum

Scientific classification
- Kingdom: Animalia
- Phylum: Platyhelminthes
- Class: Monogenea
- Order: Mazocraeidea
- Family: Diplozoidae; Palombi, 1949

= Diplozoidae =

Family of flatworms

Diplozoidae is a family of monogeneans in the order Mazocraeidea. In all species of this family, the bodies of the two hermaphroditic members of a couple are permanently fused for life. These monogeneans are parasitic on the gills of freshwater fish.

== Genera ==
- Afrodiplozoon Khotenovsky, 1981
- Diplozoon von Nordmann, 1832 Example of species: Diplozoon paradoxum
- Eudiplozoon (Goto, 1891) Khotenovsky, 1984 Example of species: Eudiplozoon nipponicum
- Neodiplozoon Tripathi, 1960
- Paradiplozoon Akhmerov, 1974. Example of species: Paradiplozoon hemiculteri, Paradiplozoon yunnanense.
