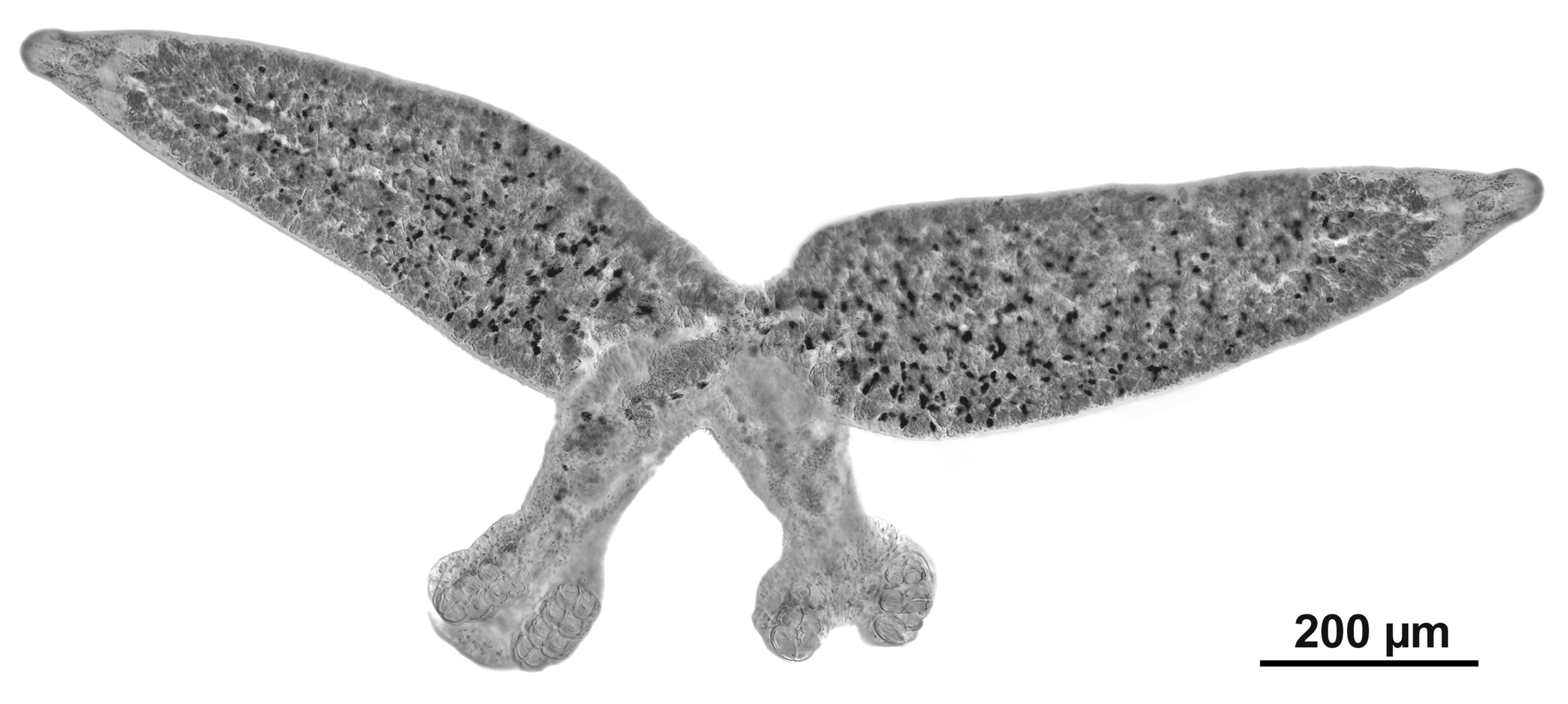

Scientific classification
- Kingdom: Animalia
- Phylum: Platyhelminthes
- Class: Monogenea
- Order: Mazocraeidea
- Family: Diplozoidae
- Genus: Paradiplozoon
- Species: P. hemiculteri

Binomial name
- Paradiplozoon hemiculteri Ling, 1973

= Paradiplozoon hemiculteri =

Species of flatworm

Paradiplozoon hemiculteri is a species of monogenean of the family Diplozoidae. As in all species of this family, the bodies of the two hermaphroditic members of a couple are permanently fused for life.

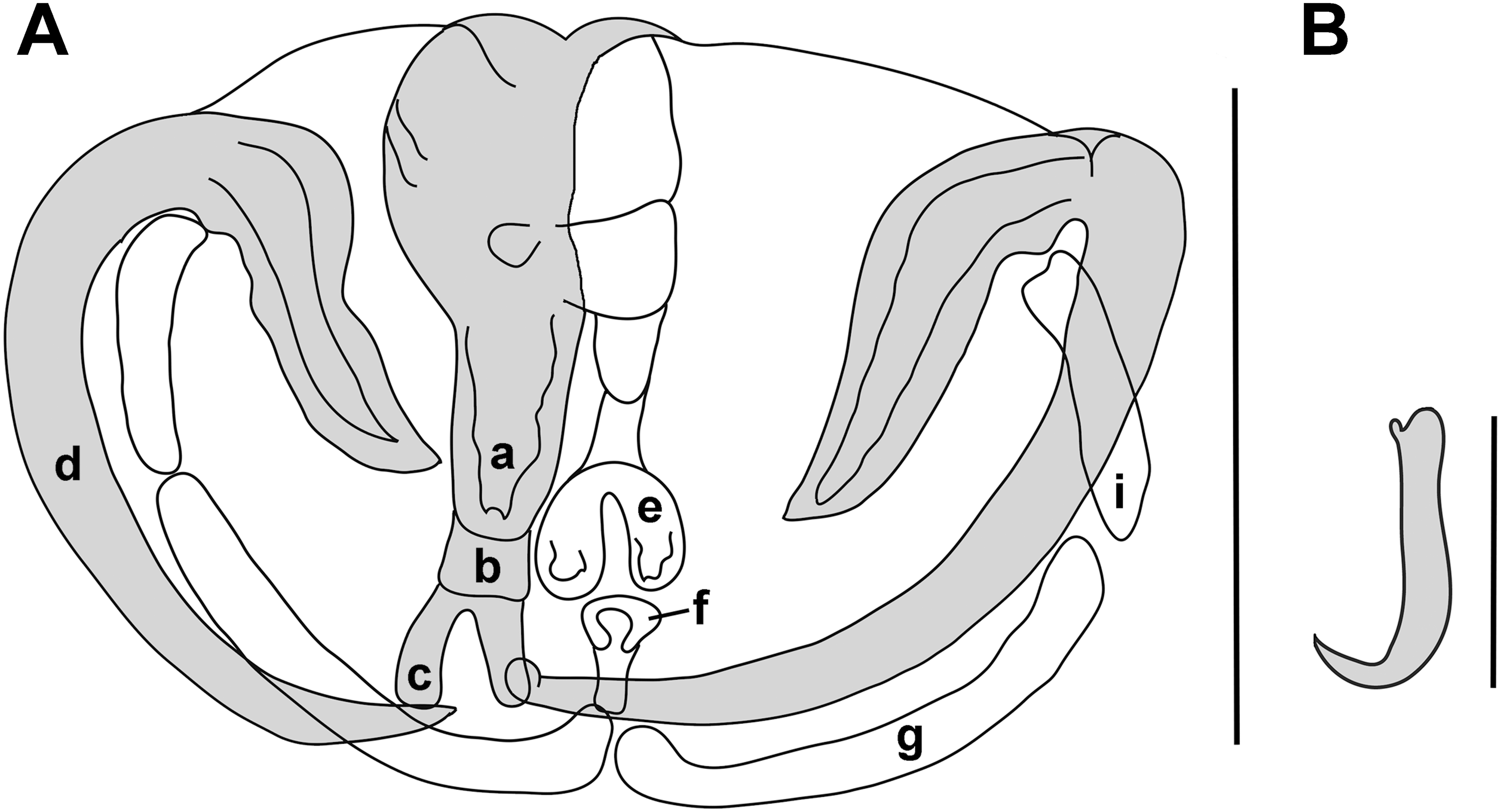
The clamp in the haptor of Paradiplozoon hemiculteri

This monogenean is a parasite of the gills of the sharpbelly Hemiculter leucisculus in China. According to Jirsová et al., P. hemiculteri is the only diplozoid found on the gills of H. leucisculus to date.
