= Hemiculter krempfi =

Conservation status
- Data Deficient (IUCN 3.1)

Scientific classification
- Domain: Eukaryota
- Kingdom: Animalia
- Phylum: Chordata
- Class: Actinopterygii
- Order: Cypriniformes
- Suborder: Cyprinoidei
- Family: Xenocyprididae
- Genus: Hemiculter
- Species: H. krempfi

Binomial name
- Hemiculter krempfi Pellegrin & Chevey, 1938

Species of fish

Hemiculter krempfi is a species of ray-finned fish in the genus Hemiculter. It is known only from the Cai River in Khanh Hoa Province and the Da Rang River in Phu Yen Province of central Vietnam. Here it is found mainly over sand substrates and is infrequently encountered in fish markets.

== Etymology ==
The fish is named in honor of French marine biologist Armand Krempf (1879–?), of the Nha Trang Institute of Oceanography in Vietnam, who collected the holotype specimen.
