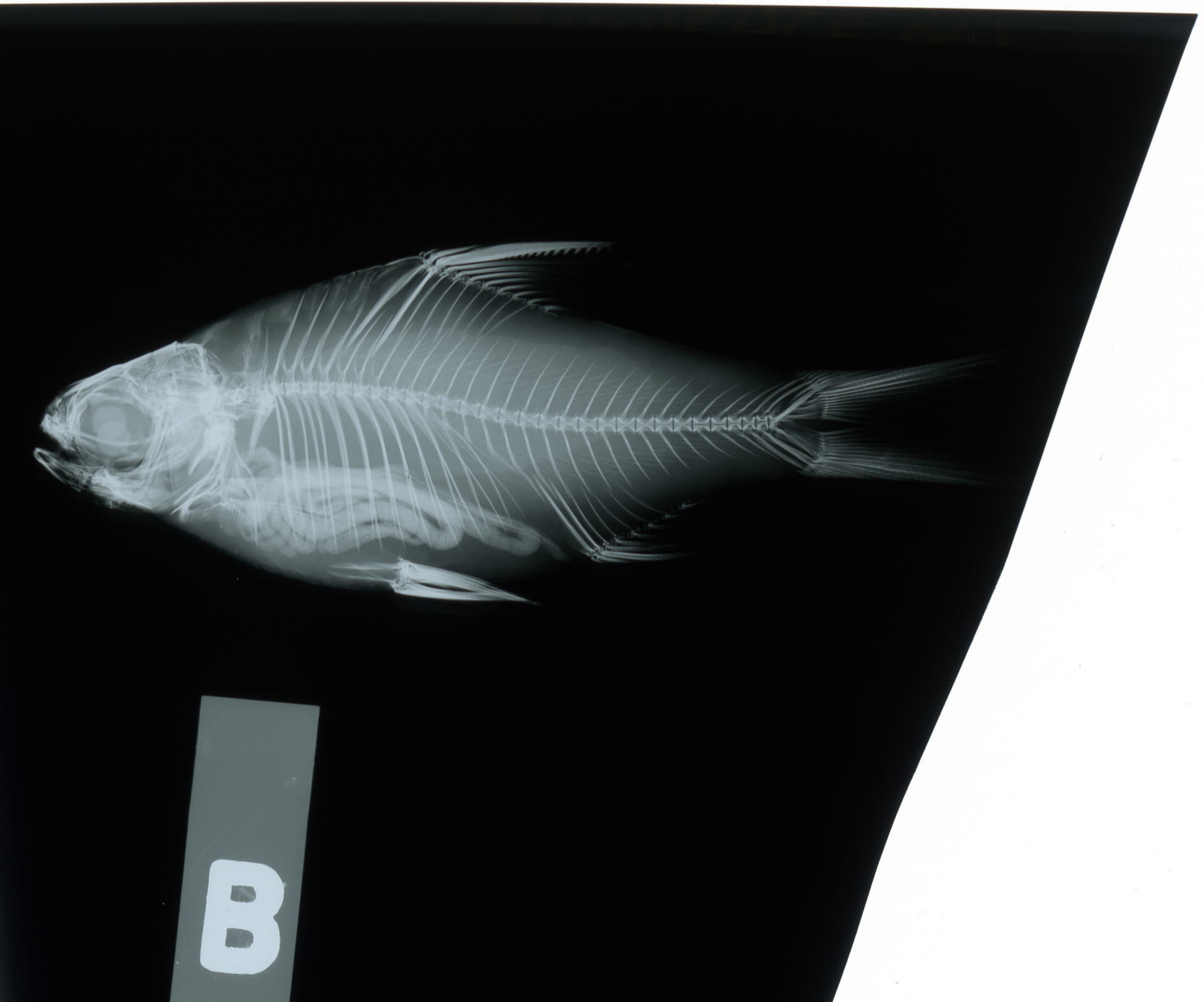
- Specimen of Sikukia stejnegeri from the Mekong River drainage.

Conservation status
- Least Concern (IUCN 3.1)

Scientific classification
- Kingdom: Animalia
- Phylum: Chordata
- Class: Actinopterygii
- Division: Teleostei
- Order: Cypriniformes
- Family: Cyprinidae
- Genus: Sikukia
- Species: S. stejnegeri

Binomial name
- Sikukia stejnegeri H. M. Smith, 1931

= Sikukia stejnegeri =

Species of fish

Sikukia stejnegeri is a species of freshwater ray-finned fish in the family Cyprinidae, which includes the carps, barbs, minnows, and related fishes. It is one of five known species in the genus Sikukia, all native to the river systems of mainland Southeast Asia. The species is found primarily in the Mekong and Chao Phraya basins, with populations also recorded from the Maeklong drainage. It was described in 1931 by the American ichthyologist Hugh McCormick Smith, who made it the type species of the new genus. The fish is a medium-sized, schooling, pelagic cyprinid of large lowland rivers and their tributaries, and it supports local subsistence and commercial fisheries throughout its range. Because of its wide distribution and current population stability, the International Union for Conservation of Nature (IUCN) has assessed it as Least Concern.

== Taxonomy and systematics ==
=== Original description ===
Hugh McCormick Smith established the genus Sikukia and described its first two species, S. stejnegeri and S. gudgeri, in a 1931 paper titled "Descriptions of new genera and species of Siamese fishes". The type locality was given as "Sikuk, on the Chao Phraya River, central Thailand." The holotype, catalogued as USNM 85738, is deposited at the National Museum of Natural History in Washington, D.C. Paratypes were collected from several other sites along the Chao Phraya and its tributaries.

Smith's description was based on a series of adult specimens. He noted the lack of barbels, the deep, compressed body, the relatively small head, and the distinctive silvery coloration with a dark spot at the base of the caudal fin. He chose the generic name Sikukia after the village of Sikuk (now part of Chai Nat Province), and the specific epithet stejnegeri in honour of Leonhard Stejneger, a Norwegian-born zoologist who was curator of reptiles and amphibians at the Smithsonian and who had encouraged Smith's work on Siamese fishes.

=== Phylogenetic position ===
Within the family Cyprinidae, Sikukia is traditionally placed in the subfamily Cyprininae, often near the large group of Asian barbs that include the genera Barbonymus, Poropuntius, and Hypsibarbus. The exact relationships remain unresolved because molecular phylogenetic studies have sampled only a few representatives. Sikukia species are morphologically distinct in lacking barbels, which separates them from most other cyprinins. Some authors have speculated a close affinity with the genus Cyclocheilichthys, which also has some barbel‑less species, but the two genera differ in details of the pharyngeal teeth and scale morphology.

=== Species diversity and differentiation ===
The genus contains five described species:

- Sikukia stejnegeri Smith, 1931
- Sikukia gudgeri Smith, 1931
- Sikukia flavicaudata Chu & Chen, 1987
- Sikukia longibarbata Li, Chen, Yang & Chen, 1999
- Sikukia album (Kottelat, 2001) – formerly in Sikukia, now often placed in Cyclocheilichthys pending review.

Sikukia stejnegeri is distinguished from its congeners by a suite of meristic and morphometric characters, summarised in the table below.

Key distinguishing characters of Sikukia species
Character	S. stejnegeri	S. gudgeri	S. flavicaudata	S. longibarbata
Lateral line scales	31–34	29–32	33–35	30–33
Dorsal fin rays (branched)	7–8	7	7	7
Anal fin rays (branched)	5–6	5	5	5
Barbels	Absent	Absent	Absent	One pair (maxillary)
Caudal fin color	Dusky margin, often red in life	Reddish with black edge	Yellow or orange	Hyaline
Body depth (% SL)	31–36	28–33	30–34	29–33
Distribution	Chao Phraya, Mekong, Maeklong	Chao Phraya, Mekong	Upper Mekong (Yunnan)	Upper Mekong (Yunnan)

The presence of a single pair of maxillary barbels in S. longibarbata is notable because the generic name Sikukia was originally diagnosed as lacking barbels. Some authors therefore consider S. longibarbata to be incorrectly placed, and it may eventually be transferred to another genus once a comprehensive phylogenetic analysis is completed.

== Description ==
=== General morphology ===
Sikukia stejnegeri has a moderately deep and strongly compressed body. The dorsal profile is more convex than the ventral profile, giving the fish a somewhat rhomboid silhouette. The greatest body depth lies just anterior to the dorsal fin origin. The head is short and conical, with a pointed snout. The mouth is small, subterminal, and lacks any trace of barbels—a feature that is used to quickly separate it from many sympatric cyprinids.

The eyes are moderately large and positioned high on the head, adapted for surface and mid‑water feeding. The gill rakers are long and closely set, numbering 18 to 22 on the lower limb of the first gill arch, reflecting its planktivorous habits.

=== Fins ===
The dorsal fin has three unbranched and seven to eight branched rays. The last unbranched ray is ossified and weakly serrated along its posterior edge, similar to many barbs. The pectoral fins are relatively short, not reaching the pelvic fin base. The pelvic fins have one unbranched and eight branched rays. The anal fin has three unbranched and five to six branched rays. The caudal fin is deeply forked, with pointed lobes of equal length.

=== Scales ===
The scales are large, cycloid, and moderately deciduous. The lateral line is complete and gently curved downward over the pectoral fin, then runs straight to the base of the caudal peduncle. It contains 31 to 34 scales, most commonly 32. There are 5.5 to 6.5 scales above the lateral line and 4.5 to 5.5 below it. The predorsal scales number 10 to 12 and are arranged in a regular pattern.

=== Coloration ===
In life, the body is a bright silver, darker on the back and grading to white on the belly. The operculum has a golden sheen. A faint dusky spot is often present on the caudal peduncle, just before the caudal fin base. The fins are generally hyaline, but the caudal fin typically shows a dusky posterior margin; in some populations the caudal fin has a reddish hue, particularly during the spawning season. Preserved specimens lose the silver lustre and become dull greyish‑brown.

=== Morphometrics ===
Smith (1931) provided the following proportional measurements based on the type series:

- Body depth: 31–36% of standard length
- Head length: 24–27% of standard length
- Eye diameter: 27–31% of head length
- Interorbital width: 33–37% of head length
- Caudal peduncle depth: 11–13% of standard length

Maximum recorded total length is about 25 cm, but most adults encountered in fisheries are between 15 and 20 cm.

== Distribution and habitat ==
=== Geographical range ===
Sikukia stejnegeri is endemic to mainland Southeast Asia. Its confirmed native range includes:

- The Chao Phraya basin in central Thailand, from the lower reaches up to Nakhon Sawan Province.
- The Mekong basin in Thailand, Laos, Cambodia, and probably southern Yunnan (China) and Vietnam, though records from the latter need verification.
- The Maeklong basin in western Thailand, where it occurs in the main stem and larger tributaries.

Smith's original collections were made at Sikuk (Chao Phraya), Paknam Pho (now Nakhon Sawan), and several other sites along the central Thai rivers. Subsequent ichthyological surveys by Maurice Kottelat and others have confirmed its presence throughout the middle and lower Mekong, including the Tonle Sap system in Cambodia.

=== Habitat preferences ===
The species is a true riverine fish, found primarily in the main channels of large, slow‑flowing lowland rivers. It prefers turbid water with a muddy or sandy substrate, and it is most abundant at depths of 2 to 10 meters. During the dry season (November to May in the Mekong), adults congregate in the deeper, slower sections of the river, often around submerged timber, bridge pilings, or rocky outcrops.

When the annual monsoon floods begin in June–July, the fish moves laterally into inundated floodplains, oxbow lakes, and submerged forests. Here it finds abundant food and spawning grounds. Juveniles often remain in these floodplain habitats until the water recedes, at which point they move back to the main channel along with adults. The species is thus highly dependent on the natural flood pulse of large Southeast Asian rivers, and any alteration of the flow regime—for instance by upstream dams—could negatively affect its population dynamics.

== Ecology ==
=== Diet and feeding ===
Sikukia stejnegeri is a pelagic omnivore with a strong tendency toward planktivory. Examination of stomach contents from Mekong specimens has revealed a diet dominated by phytoplankton (especially diatoms and cyanobacteria) and zooplankton (copepods, cladocerans, and rotifers). It also consumes aquatic insect larvae, particularly chironomids and ephemeropterans, and it ingests a significant amount of detritus and algae scraped from submerged surfaces.

The fish feeds actively during daylight hours, swimming in loose schools at mid‑water. Its long gill rakers are well suited for filtering small organisms from the water column, and its subterminal mouth allows it to pick food items from the substrate when necessary. In the flood season, it shifts its feeding to the newly inundated terrestrial vegetation and the associated periphyton.

=== Reproduction and life cycle ===
Relatively little specific information has been published on the reproductive biology of S. stejnegeri, but it is possible to infer a general pattern from closely related riverine cyprinids and from the limited observations made by fishery biologists.

The species is a broadcast spawner that releases semi‑buoyant, non‑adhesive eggs into flowing water at the beginning of the rainy season. In the Mekong basin, spawning migrations occur from May to July, triggered by rising water levels and increased turbidity. Adults move upstream to shallow riffles and gravel beds in tributaries, where they spawn in the early morning hours. A single female may release several thousand eggs, which are fertilised externally and then drift downstream in the current.

The eggs hatch within 24 to 36 hours at water temperatures of 26–28 °C. The larvae are initially planktivorous, feeding on rotifers and small cladocerans. They grow rapidly during the flood season, reaching a length of 5–7 cm by the time the floodwaters recede in October–November. Sexual maturity is attained at about one year of age and at a total length of 12–15 cm. The maximum lifespan in the wild is estimated to be four to five years.

=== Parasites ===
Like many cyprinid fishes, S. stejnegeri is host to a variety of parasites. External parasites include monogenean trematodes (Dactylogyrus spp.) on the gills and skin, and copepods (Lernaea spp.) that attach to the body surface. Internally, it harbours digenean flukes in the intestine and nematode worms in the body cavity. The species is also an intermediate host for certain tapeworms that infect piscivorous birds. Parasite loads tend to be higher in floodplain habitats than in the main river channel.

=== Predators and competitors ===
The fish is preyed upon by a range of piscivorous species, including the larger catfishes (Pangasius, Wallago), snakeheads (Channa), and the giant freshwater stingray (Urogymnus polylepis). Birds such as cormorants and herons also take a significant number of juvenile fish in shallow floodplain waters.

Ecologically, S. stejnegeri shares its habitat with a large community of other planktivorous cyprinids, including species of Barbonymus, Labiobarbus, Cirrhinus, and Henicorhynchus. Niche partitioning appears to be achieved through differences in gill raker morphology, preferred water depth, and the relative proportion of phytoplankton versus zooplankton in the diet.

== Relationship with humans ==
=== Fisheries ===
Sikukia stejnegeri is a valuable component of the inland capture fisheries of the Mekong and Chao Phraya basins. It is caught primarily with stationary gill nets, seines, and bamboo traps. It is often taken in mixed‑species hauls with other small to medium‑sized cyprinids, and in some areas it is targeted specifically when it forms pre‑spawning aggregations.

The fish is sold fresh in local markets, where it fetches a moderate price. It is also processed into fermented fish paste (pla ra in Thailand, padek in Laos) and dried fish, products that can be stored for months and transported to distant markets. In Cambodia, it contributes to the production of prahok, a staple fermented fish product of the lower Mekong.

Subsistence fishers in rural communities rely on S. stejnegeri as an important source of animal protein, particularly during the dry season when other fish species are less abundant. The fish is also taken by recreational anglers, though it is not a primary sport species.

=== In captivity ===
There are no reports of large‑scale aquaculture of S. stejnegeri, though it may be incidentally raised in integrated fish ponds in Thailand. The species is not common in the aquarium trade, probably because of its silvery, unremarkable coloration and its requirement for large, well‑oxygenated aquaria.

== Conservation status ==
The IUCN Red List assessment of 2012 classifies Sikukia stejnegeri as Least Concern. The assessment notes that the species is widespread and abundant throughout its range, and that there are no known major threats causing population declines at the global level. However, the following potential threats are identified:

- Hydropower development: The construction of large dams on the Mekong mainstream and major tributaries (such as the Xayaburi, Don Sahong, and Pak Beng dams) is altering the natural flow regime, blocking spawning migrations, and trapping sediments and nutrients that sustain floodplain productivity. These changes could reduce the available habitat for S. stejnegeri and other migratory cyprinids.
- Overfishing: Intense fishing pressure, particularly the use of fine‑meshed monofilament gill nets and illegal electrofishing, can deplete local populations. However, the species' high reproductive rate and short generation time provide some resilience.
- Habitat degradation: Deforestation, agricultural runoff, and urban pollution are degrading water quality in parts of the Mekong and Chao Phraya basins. Loss of floodplain connectivity through the construction of dykes and irrigation schemes further reduces nursery habitat.

In order to ensure the long‑term survival of the species, conservation measures should focus on maintaining the natural flood pulse, preserving free‑flowing river stretches, and promoting sustainable fishing practices.

== Taxonomic history and nomenclature ==
The genus Sikukia was erected by Smith (1931) with the following diagnosis: "Body deep, compressed; mouth small, without barbels; dorsal fin with a serrated spine; anal fin short; scales large." He recognised two species: S. stejnegeri and S. gudgeri. The latter was distinguished by a deeper body, fewer lateral line scales, and a more pronounced dark spot on the caudal peduncle.

In 1987, Chu and Chen described S. flavicaudata from the upper Mekong in Yunnan Province, China, noting its yellow caudal fin. In 1999, Li and colleagues described S. longibarbata from the same region, surprising the ichthyological community with its single pair of barbels, a feature previously considered absent from the genus.

The fifth species, S. album, was originally described by Kottelat (2001) as Cyclocheilichthys album but later transferred to Sikukia by some workers. However, the taxonomy remains fluid, and a full revision of the genus is needed.

== Etymology ==
The generic name Sikukia is derived from "Sikuk," the village on the Chao Phraya River where the first specimens were collected. The specific name stejnegeri is a Latinised patronym in honour of Leonhard Stejneger (1851–1943), who was a curator at the United States National Museum and a prolific author on herpetology and Asian zoology.

== Common names ==
In Thailand, the fish is known as pla tapien khao (ปลาตะเพียนขาว), which translates to "white barb." In Laos and Cambodia, it is called pa khao or trey khao, again meaning "white fish." The common name "Smith's Sikukia" is sometimes used in English, though it is not widely applied. The IUCN uses the name "Stejneger’s Sikukia."

== Specimen collections ==
Significant museum collections of S. stejnegeri are held at:

- National Museum of Natural History, Washington, D.C. (holotype and paratypes)
- Natural History Museum, London
- Muséum national d'Histoire naturelle, Paris
- Thai National Science Museum, Pathum Thani
- Zoological Reference Collection, National University of Singapore

These collections provide a valuable baseline for future taxonomic and biogeographic studies.

== See also ==
- List of freshwater fishes of Thailand
- List of fishes in the Mekong
