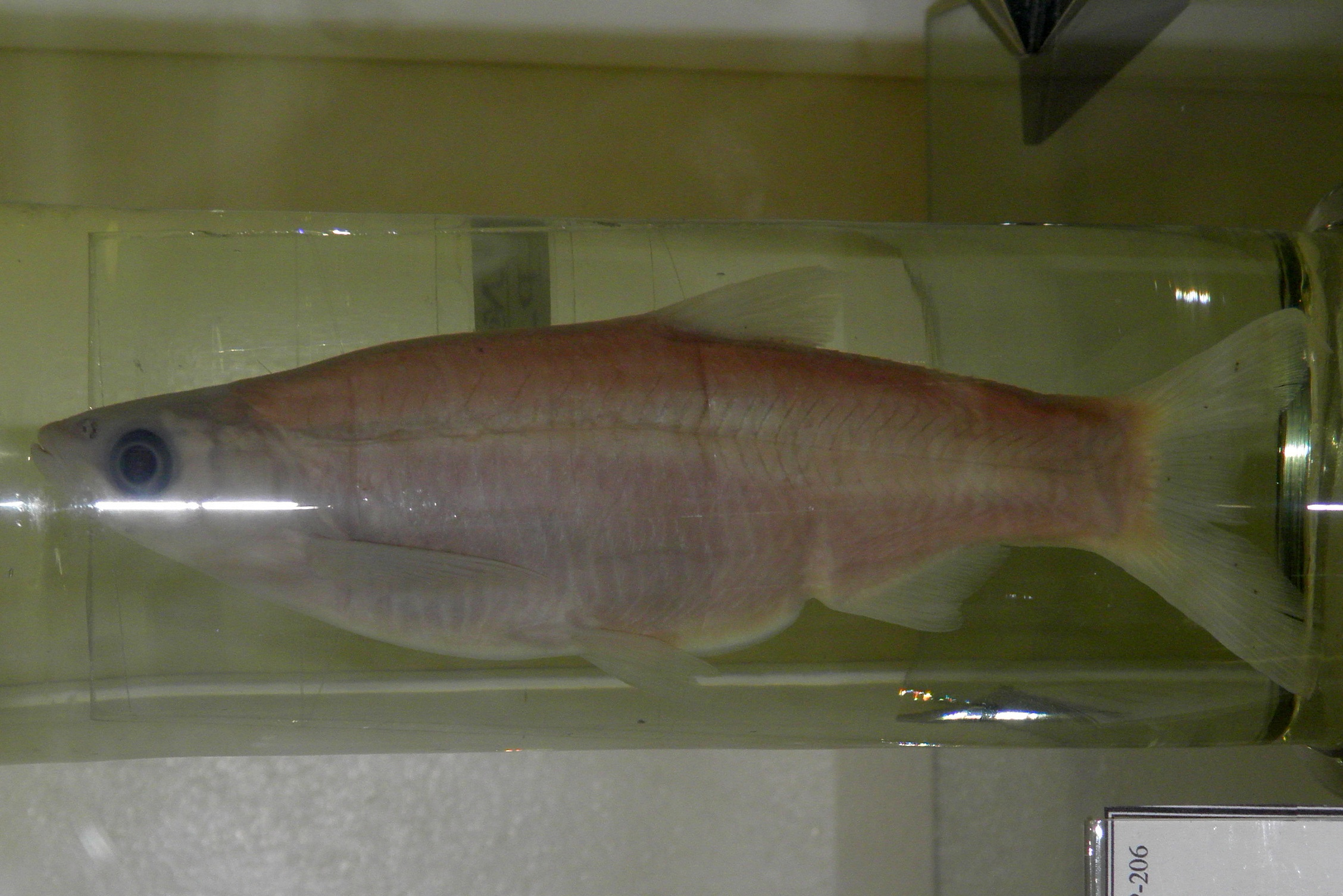
- Sharpbelly, Hemiculter leucisculus

Scientific classification
- Kingdom: Animalia
- Phylum: Chordata
- Class: Actinopterygii
- Order: Cypriniformes
- Family: Xenocyprididae
- Genus: Hemiculter; Bleeker, 1860

Type species
- Hemiculter leucisculus (Basilewsky, 1855)

Synonyms
- Cultriculus Ōshima, 1919; Kendallia Evermann & T. H. Shaw, 1927

= Hemiculter =

Genus of fishes

Hemiculter is a genus of freshwater ray-finned fish belonging to the family Xenocyprididae, the East Asian minnows or sharpbellies. The species in this genusare found in eastern Asia from Siberia to Viet Nam. The type species is the sharpbelly, Culter leucisculus. The name is derived from the Greek word hemis, meaning "half", and the Latin word culter, meaning "knife".

== Species ==
Hemiculter contains the following species:

- Hemiculter elongatus V. H. Nguyễn & S. V. Ngô, 2001
- Hemiculter krempfi Pellegrin & Chevey, 1938
- Hemiculter leucisculus (Basilewsky, 1855) (Sharpbelly)
- Hemiculter nikolskyi Vasil’eva, Vasil’ev & Shedko, 2022 (Nikolsky’ sharpbelly)
- Hemiculter tchangi P. W. Fang, 1942
- Hemiculter yungaoi Vasil'eva, Vasil'ev & Shedko, 2022
