= Sikukia longibarbata =

Conservation status
- Data Deficient (IUCN 3.1)

Scientific classification
- Kingdom: Animalia
- Phylum: Chordata
- Class: Actinopterygii
- Order: Cypriniformes
- Family: Cyprinidae
- Genus: Sikukia
- Species: S. longibarbata

Binomial name
- Sikukia longibarbata Z. Y. Li, Y. R. Chen, J. X. Yang & X. Y. Chen, 1998

Species of fish

Sikukia longibarbata s a species of freshwater ray-finned fish belonging to the family Cyprinidae, the family which includes the carps, barbs and related fishes. This species is known only from a tributary of the Lancang Jiang in Yunnan.
