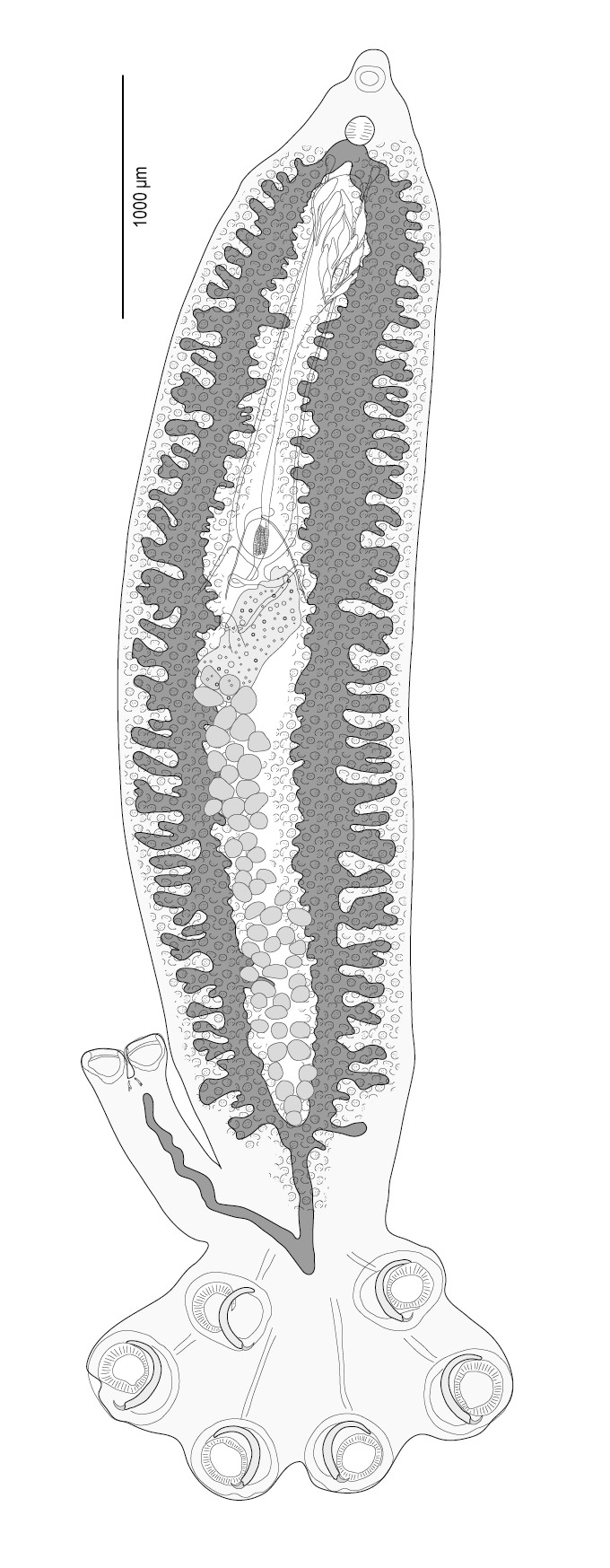
- Protocotyle euzetmaillardi

Scientific classification
- Kingdom: Animalia
- Phylum: Platyhelminthes
- Class: Monogenea
- Order: Diclybothriidea
- Family: Hexabothriidae; Price, 1942

Genera
- See text

= Hexabothriidae =

Family of flatworms

Hexabothriidae is a family of monogenean parasites. The family name was proposed by Emmett W. Price in 1942. The family includes 14-16 genera according to authors and about 60 species; all are parasitic on the gills of chondrichthyan fishes (rays, sharks and chimaeras).

Studies on phylogeny of monogeneans based on morphology, molecules or spermatozoa suggest that the Hexabothriidae are a basal group within the Polyopisthocotylea.

== Genera ==
According to the World Register of Marine Species

- Branchotenthes Bullard & Dippenaar, 2003
- Callorhynchocotyle Suriano & Incorvaia, 1982
- Dasyoncocotyle Hargis, 1955
- Epicotyle Euzet & Maillard, 1974
- Erpocotyle Van Beneden & Hesse, 1863
- Heteronchocotyle Brooks, 1934
- Hexabothrium von Nordmann, 1840
- Mobulicola Patella & Bullard, 2013
- Neonchocotyle Ktari & Maillard, 1972
- Paraheteronchocotyle Mayes, Brooks & Thorson, 1981 (omitted in WoRMS but considered valid)
- Pristonchocotyle Watson & Thorsen, 1976
- Protocotyle Euzet & Maillard, 1974 (example: Protocotyle euzetmaillardi)
- Pseudohexabothrium Brinkmann, 1952
- Rajonchocotyle Cerfontaine, 1899
- Rhinobatonchocotyle Doran, 1953
- Squalonchocotyle Cerfontaine, 1899
