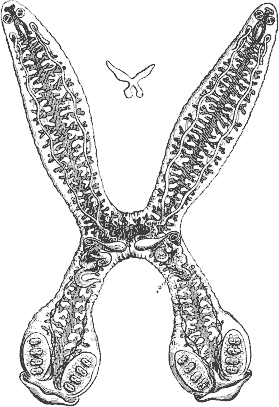

Scientific classification
- Kingdom: Animalia
- Phylum: Platyhelminthes
- Class: Monogenea
- Order: Mazocraeidea
- Family: Diplozoidae
- Genus: Diplozoon
- Species: D. paradoxum

Binomial name
- Diplozoon paradoxum von Nordmann, 1832

= Diplozoon paradoxum =

Species of flatworm

Diplozoon paradoxum is a flatworm (platyhelminth) from the class Monogenea. It is found in freshwater fishes in Asia and Europe and known for its complete monogamy. This parasite is commonly found on the gills of European cyprinid fishes. It is usually around 0.7 centimeters long (approximately the size of a fingernail) and has bilateral symmetry. It has several hooks at its mouth which it uses to grab on to the gills of a fish. From there it feeds on the blood of the cyprinid.

They exhibit strong seasonal variation in their reproductive activity. Unlike most parasites that produce gametes all year, D. paradoxum gametes are produced primarily during the spring, with the highest production from May to June and continuing through the rest of the summer. The eggs are laid in a freshwater fish's gills. There it hatches into a larval stage (oncomiracidium, diporpa). It remains in that stage unless two larvae come together. Then the two larvae undergo metamorphosis and become fused.

== Life cycle ==
The life cycle of D. paradoxum is unique. A diporpa larva can live for several months, but it cannot develop further until encountering another diporpa; unless this happens, the diporpa usually dies. When one diporpa finds another, each attaches its sucker to the dorsal papilla of the other. The two worms fuse completely, with no trace of separating partitions. The fusion stimulates maturation. Gonads appear; the male genital duct of one terminates near the female genital duct of the other, permitting cross-fertilization. Two more pairs of clamps develop in the opisthaptor (the attachment organ) of each. Adults can apparently live in this state for several years.

According to The New York Times:

Diplozoon paradoxum [is] a flatworm that lives in gills of freshwater fish. "Two immature hermaphrodite individuals meet each other, and their bodies literally fuse together, whereupon they remain faithful until death," Dr. [David P.] Barash said. "That's the only species I know of in which there seems to be 100 percent monogamy."

== Gallery ==
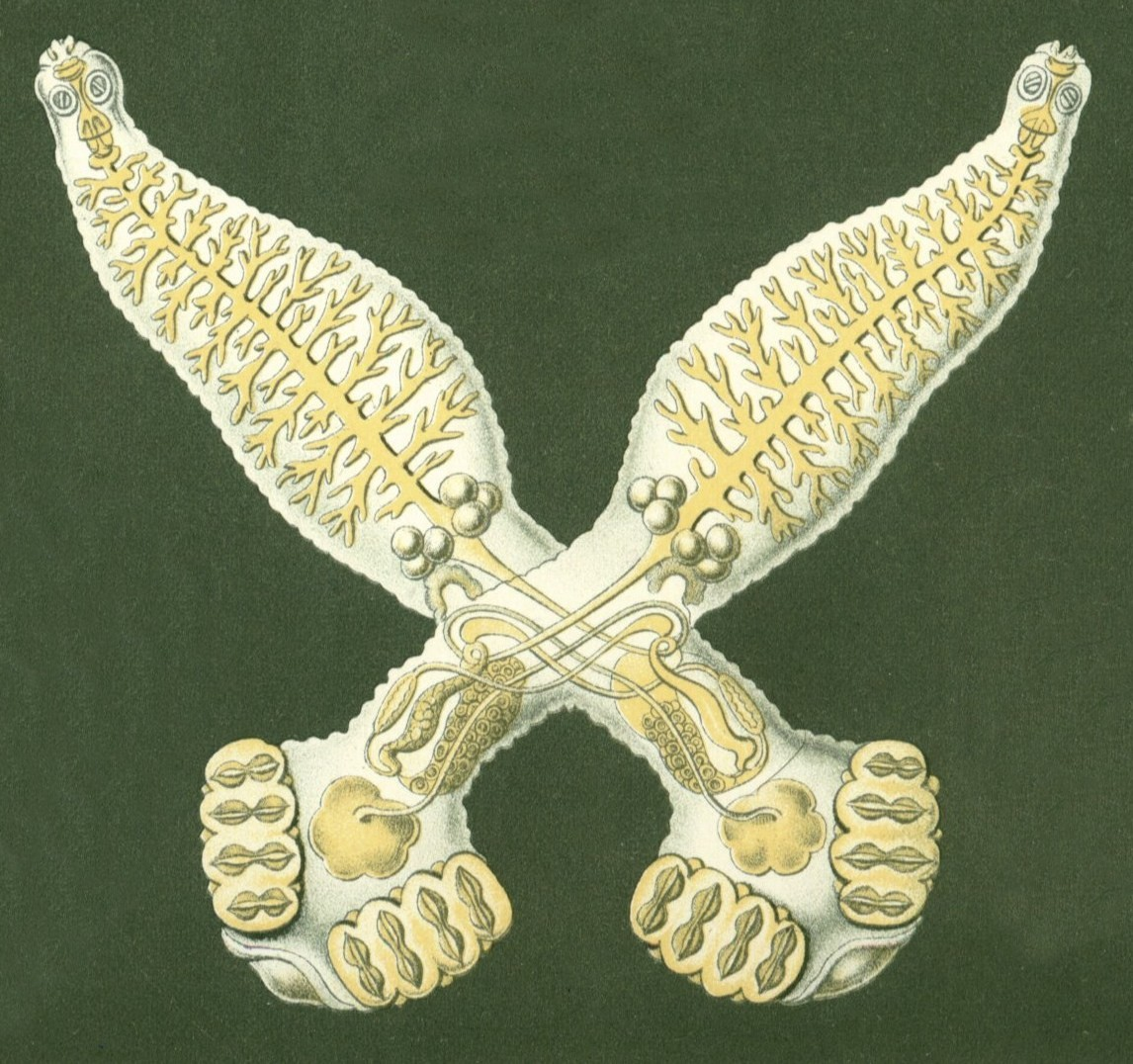
Diplozoon paradoxum by Ernst Haeckel
