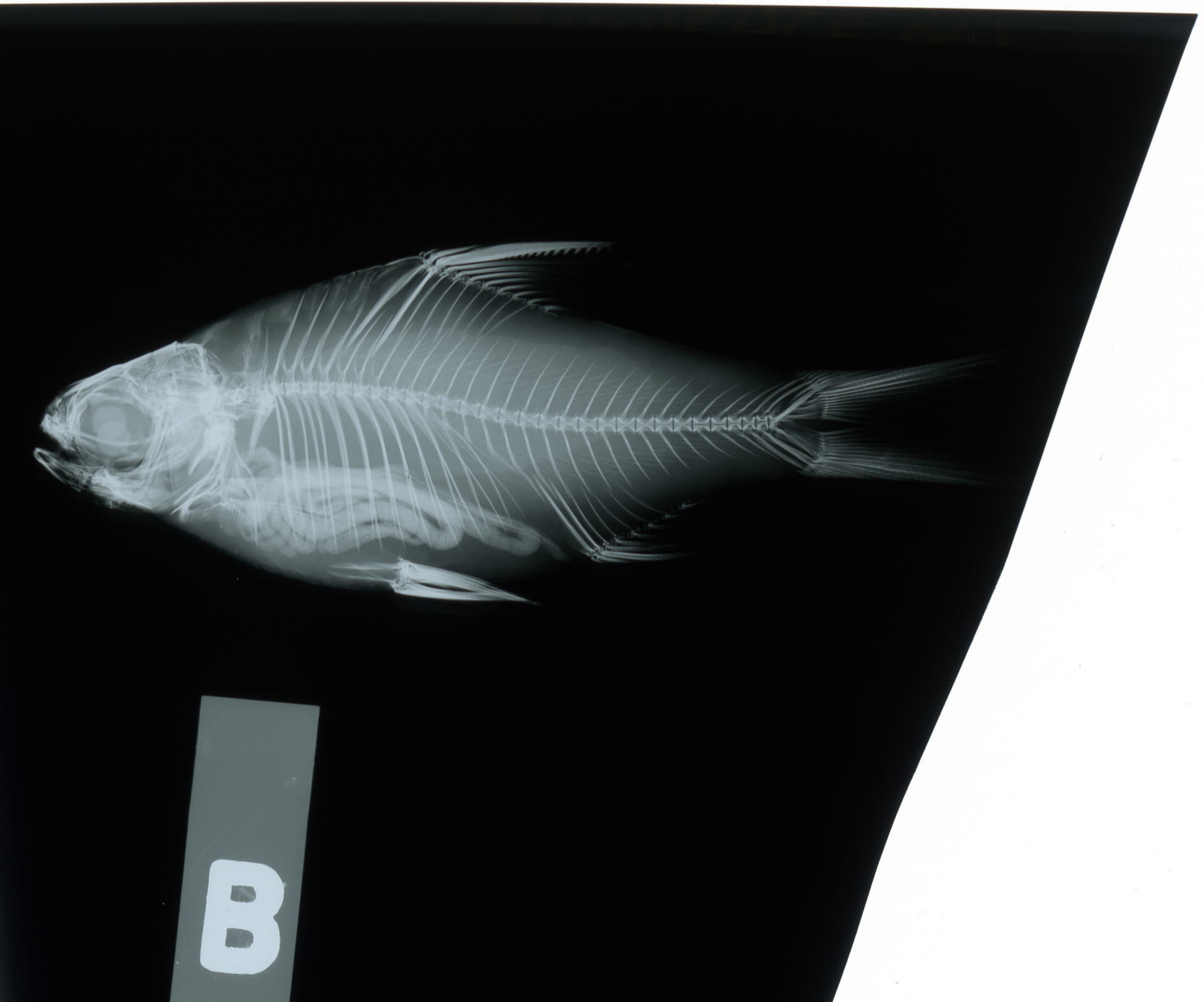
- Sikukia stejnegeri Smith

Scientific classification
- Kingdom: Animalia
- Phylum: Chordata
- Class: Actinopterygii
- Order: Cypriniformes
- Family: Cyprinidae
- Subfamily: Cyprininae
- Genus: Sikukia; H. M. Smith, 1931

Type species
- Sikukia stejnegeri H. M. Smith, 1931

Synonyms
- Xenocheilichthys H. M. Smith, 1934

= Sikukia =

Genus of fishes

Sikukia is a genus of freshwater ray-finned fishes belonging to the family Cyprinidae, the family which includes the carps, barbs and related fishes. This fishes in this genus are found in eastern Asia.

Its genus name Sikukia refers to "Khlong Sikuk" (Thai: คลองสีกุก), also known as "Khwae Sikuk" (แควสีกุก, lit. 'Sikul Canal'), another name for the Noi River in Chai Nat Province, central Thailand, including areas in Bang Ban District of Ayutthaya Province. It was first discovered on November 26, 1931, by H.M. Smith.

== Species ==
Sikukia has the following species classified within it:

- Sikukia flavicaudata X. L. Chu & Y. R. Chen, 1987
- Sikukia gudgeri (H. M. Smith, 1934)
- Sikukia longibarbata Z. Y. Li, Y. R. Chen, J. X. Yang & X. Y. Chen, 1998
- Sikukia stejnegeri H. M. Smith, 1931
