= Hemiculter tchangi =

Conservation status
- Data Deficient (IUCN 3.1)

Scientific classification
- Kingdom: Animalia
- Phylum: Chordata
- Class: Actinopterygii
- Order: Cypriniformes
- Suborder: Cyprinoidei
- Family: Xenocyprididae
- Genus: Hemiculter
- Species: H. tchangi

Binomial name
- Hemiculter tchangi P. W. Fang, 1942

Synonyms
- Hemiculter nigromarginis P. L. Yih & C. K. Wu, 1964

Species of fish

Hemiculter tchangi is a species of freshwater ray-finned fish belonging to the family Xenocyprididae, the East Asian minnows or sharpbellies. This species has only been recorded from the upper reaches of the Yangtze River in Sichuan.
