= Sikukia flavicaudata =

Conservation status
- Data Deficient (IUCN 3.1)

Scientific classification
- Kingdom: Animalia
- Phylum: Chordata
- Class: Actinopterygii
- Order: Cypriniformes
- Family: Cyprinidae
- Genus: Sikukia
- Species: S. flavicaudata

Binomial name
- Sikukia flavicaudata Chu & Chen, 1987

Species of fish

Sikukia flavicaudata is a species of freshwater ray-finned fish belonging to the family Cyprinidae, the family which includes the carps, barbs and related fishes. This fish is found in the upper Mekong river system, in Yunnan, it has also been recorded in Laos, and may be found in Myanmar and northern Thailand.
