= Diclybothriidae =

Scientific classification
- Kingdom: Animalia
- Phylum: Platyhelminthes
- Class: Monogenea
- Order: Diclybothriidea
- Family: Diclybothriidae; Bychowski & Gusev, 1950

Family of flatworms

Diclybothriidae is a family of monogeneans in the order Diclybothriidea.

== Genera ==
- Diclybothrium Leuckart, 1835
- Paradiclybothrium Bychowski & Gusev, 1950
