= Sharpbelly =

Conservation status
- Least Concern (IUCN 3.1)

Scientific classification
- Kingdom: Animalia
- Phylum: Chordata
- Class: Actinopterygii
- Division: Teleostei
- Order: Cypriniformes
- Suborder: Cyprinoidei
- Family: Xenocyprididae
- Genus: Hemiculter
- Species: H. leucisculus

Binomial name
- Hemiculter leucisculus (Basilewsky, 1855)

Synonyms
- Culter leucisculus Basilewsky, 1855; Squaliobarbus annamiticus Tirant, 1883; Culter balnei Sauvage, 1884; Hemiculter kneri Warpachowski, 1887; Hemiculter schrencki Warpachowski, 1888; Hemiculter kneri Kreyenberg & Pappenheim, 1908; Parapelecus eigenmanni D. S. Jordan & Metz, 1913; Hemiculter eigenmanni (D. S. Jordan & Metz 1913); Cultriculus aokensis Ōshima, 1920; Parapelecus elongatus Mori, 1927; Kendallia goldsboroughi Evermann & T. H. Shaw, 1927

Species of fish

The sharpbelly or wild carp, sharpbelly, or common sawbelly (Hemiculter leucisculus), is a tropical freshwater and brackish water fish belonging to the family Xenocyprididae. It originates in large streams and reservoirs in mainland China, Taiwan, Hong Kong, Korea, and the Amur River basin. It has become established as an exotic species in several other countries, including Iran, Afghanistan, and the former Soviet Union, where it has displaced local species. It was originally described as Culter leucisculus by S. Basilewsky in 1855, and has also been referred to as Chanodichthys leucisculus and Hemiculter leucisculus warpachowskii in scientific literature.

The fish reaches a size up to 23.0 cm (9.1 in) long, and is native to fresh and brackish water habitats with a pH of 7.0, a hardness of 15 DH, and a temperature of 18 to 22 °C (64 to 72 °F). It is green-gray on the back, and white in the belly.

The bulk of its diet includes zooplankton, insects, crustaceans, algae, and detritus. It is of minor commercial importance, primarily in mainland China, where it is canned. In Hong Kong, it is not favored as a table fish because the flesh is unpalatable and very bony.

== Parasites ==
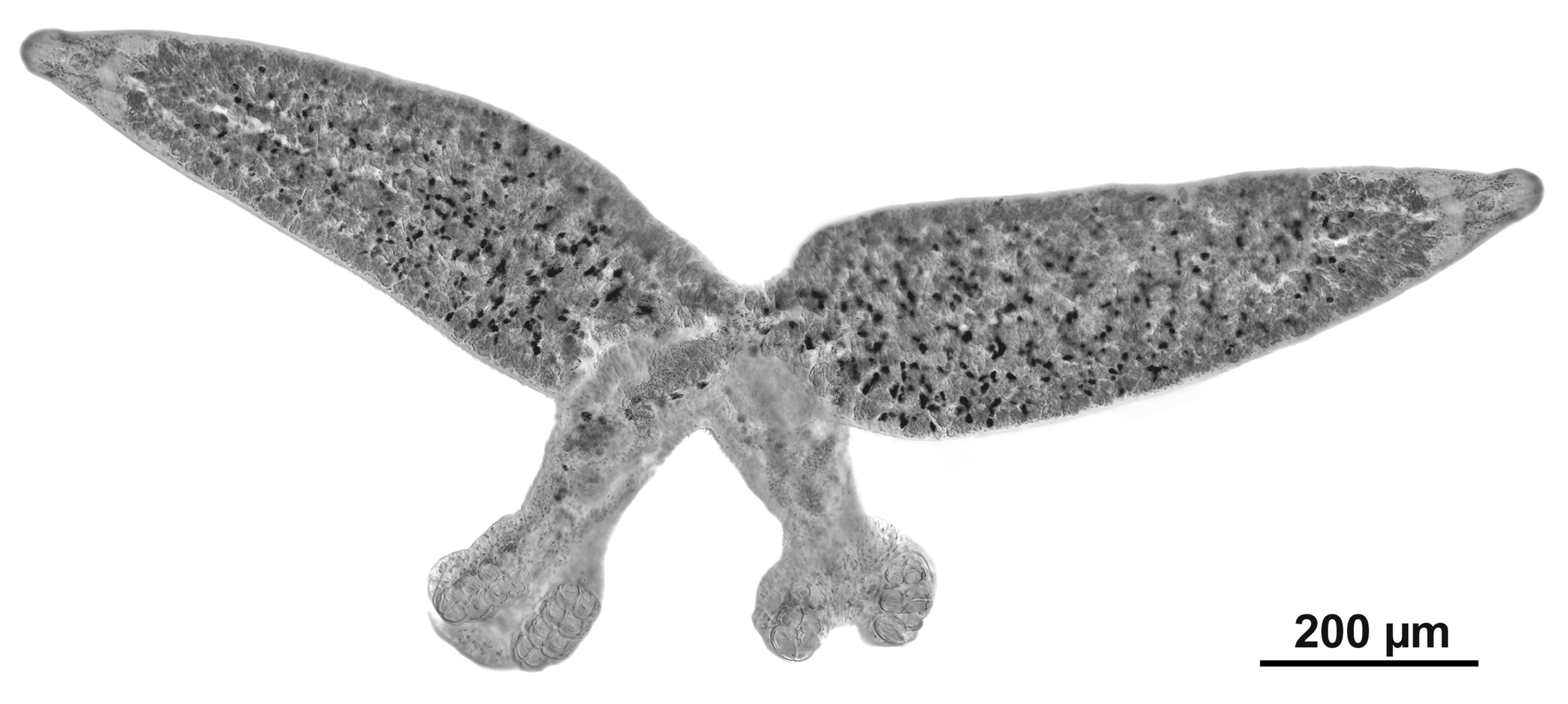
The monogenean Paradiplozoon hemiculteri

As most fish species, the sharpbelly harbours several species of parasites. One of them is Paradiplozoon hemiculteri, a monogenean living on the gills. This species is special in that the two hermaphroditic members of the couple are united for life.
