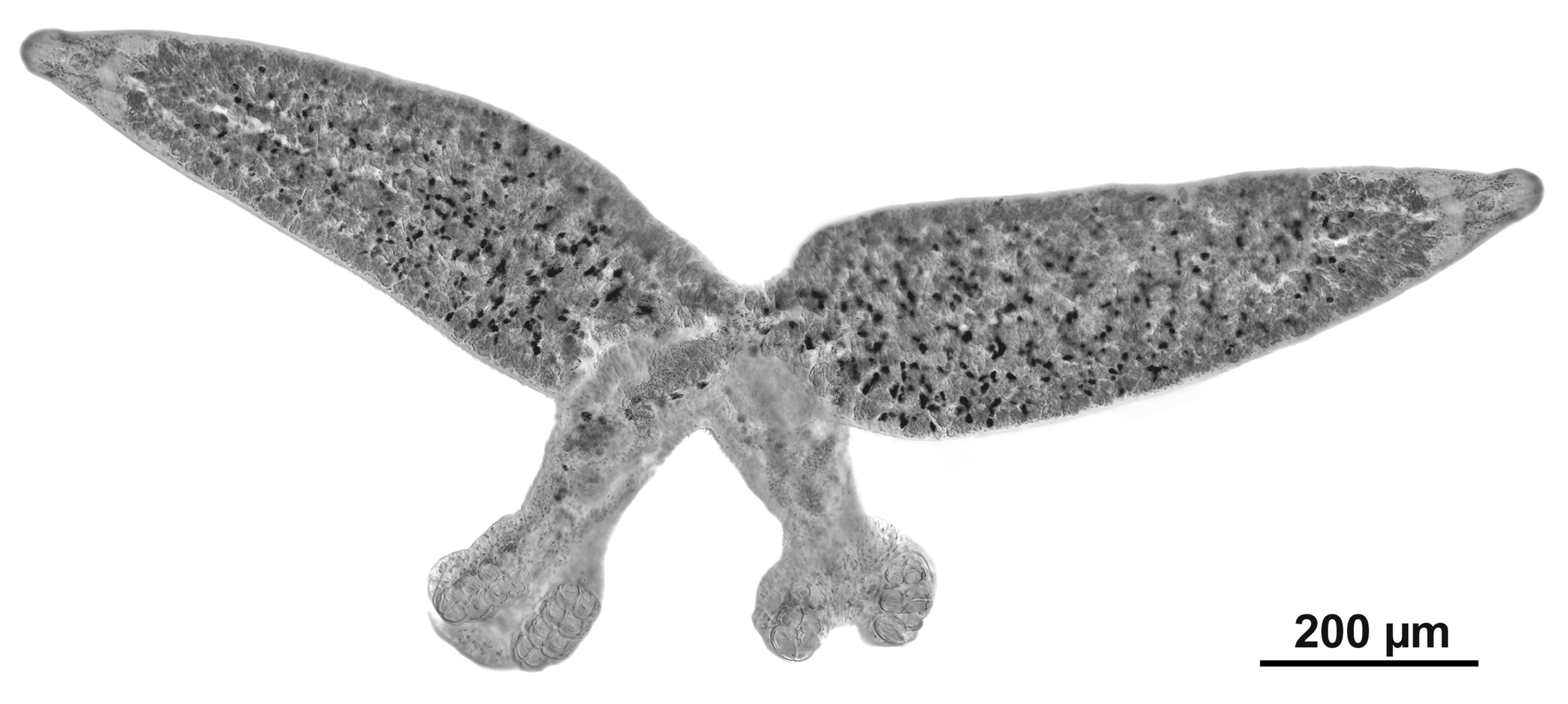
- Paradiplozoon hemiculteri

Scientific classification
- Kingdom: Animalia
- Phylum: Platyhelminthes
- Class: Monogenea
- Order: Mazocraeidea
- Family: Diplozoidae
- Genus: Paradiplozoon; Akhmerov, 1974

Species
- See text

= Paradiplozoon =

Genus of flatworms

Paradiplozoon is a genus of polyopisthocotylean monogeneans (a group of ectoparasitic flatworms), included in the family Diplozoidae.

According to the World Register of Marine Species, the genus includes the following species:

- Paradiplozoon bliccae (Reichenbach-Klinke, 1961)
- Paradiplozoon chazaricum (Mikailov, 1973)
- Paradiplozoon cirrhini Huang, Zhou, Yuan & Ding, 2023
- Paradiplozoon hemiculteri (Ling, 1973)
- Paradiplozoon homoion (Bychowsky & Nagibina, 1959)
- Paradiplozoon ichthyoxanthon Avenant-Oldewage, le Roux, Mashego & van Vuuren, 2013
- Paradiplozoon iraqense Al-Nasiri & Balbuena, 2016
- Paradiplozoon rutili (Gläser, 1967)
- Paradiplozoon skrjabini Akhmerov, 1974
- Paradiplozoon vaalense Dos Santos, Jansen van Vuuren & Avenant-Oldewage, 2015
