= Alexander von Nordmann =

Finnish biologist (1803–1866)

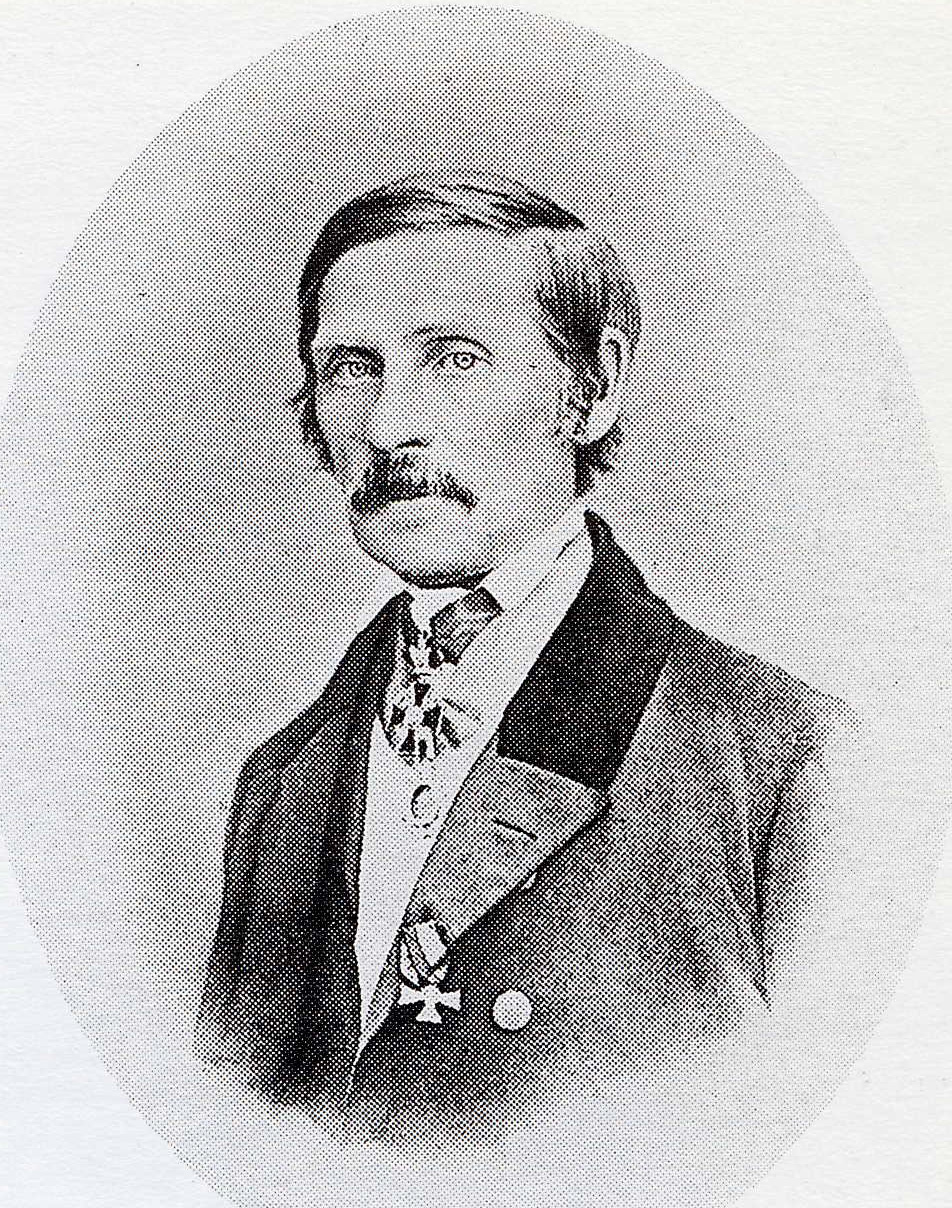
Alexander von Nordmann

Alexander von Nordmann (24 May 1803 in Ruotsinsalmi, Vyborg Governorate – 25 June 1866 in Helsinki, Grand Duchy of Finland) was a Finnish biologist, who contributed to zoology, parasitology, botany and paleontology.

== Biography ==
Nordmann was a son of an officer of the Russian army at the Ruotsinsalmi fortress, Old Finland. He started academic studies at the Imperial Academy of Turku, and at that time also acted as a curator of the entomological collections. In 1827 he continued studies in Berlin with the famous parasitologist and anatomist Karl Rudolphi. His first major work was a microscopical description of tens of parasitic worms and crustaceans from the eyes and other organs of fishes and other animals, including man. These included the enigmatic monogenean Diplozoon paradoxum.

In 1832 he was appointed a professor (teacher) at the Lyceum Richelieu in Odessa, Kherson Governorate, and in 1834 also the director of the Odessa Botanical Garden and the associated Central Gardening School. He participated in several expeditions and collected natural history specimens in southern Russia and adjacent regions. Later, in 1849, he became professor of Zoology and Botany at the Imperial Alexander University in Finland (Helsinki). He died of heart failure on 25 June 1866.

== Taxa ==
The cladoceran Evadne nordmanni, the Nordmann fir Abies nordmanniana and at least seven other species and one genus (Nordmannia) have been named after him. The standard author abbreviation Nordm. is used to indicate this individual as the author when citing a botanical name.

== Major works ==
- Mikrographische Beiträge zur Naturgeschichte der wirbellosen Thiere I - II. Berlin 1832
- Voyage dans la Russie méridionale et la Crimée, par la Hongrie, la Valachie et la Moldawie, exécuté en 1837, sous la Direction de M. Anatole de Demidoff. III. Observations sur la Faune pontique. Paris 1840
- Histoire naturelle des animaux sans vertèbres. III. Entozoa. Paris 1840
- Versuch einer Natur- und Entwickelungsgeschichte des Tergipes Edwardsii. - Mémoires présentés à l'Académie Impériale des Science de St. Petersbourg IV. St. Petersburg 1845
- Palaeontologie Südrusslands I - IV. 1858 - 1860
