= Sikukia gudgeri =

Conservation status
- Data Deficient (IUCN 3.1)

Scientific classification
- Kingdom: Animalia
- Phylum: Chordata
- Class: Actinopterygii
- Order: Cypriniformes
- Family: Cyprinidae
- Genus: Sikukia
- Species: S. gudgeri

Binomial name
- Sikukia gudgeri (Smith, 1934)

Synonyms
- Xenocheilichthys gudgeri Smith, 1934

Species of fish

Sikukia gudgeri is a species of freshwater ray-finned fish belonging to the family Cyprinidae, the family which includes the carps, barbs and related fishes. This species is found in the Mekong river system, The species is endemic to the Mekong basin, in Cambodia, Laos and Thailand, it is also known from the Tonle Sap system.

This fish is found in large upland rivers, normally near the riverbed where it is sandy. It will go into flooded farmland, although it is always found in water with a current. They strain the sand for plant and animal foods, It is caught in large numbers by trawls and haul seines in the middle Mekong along the frontier between Thailand and Laos.
