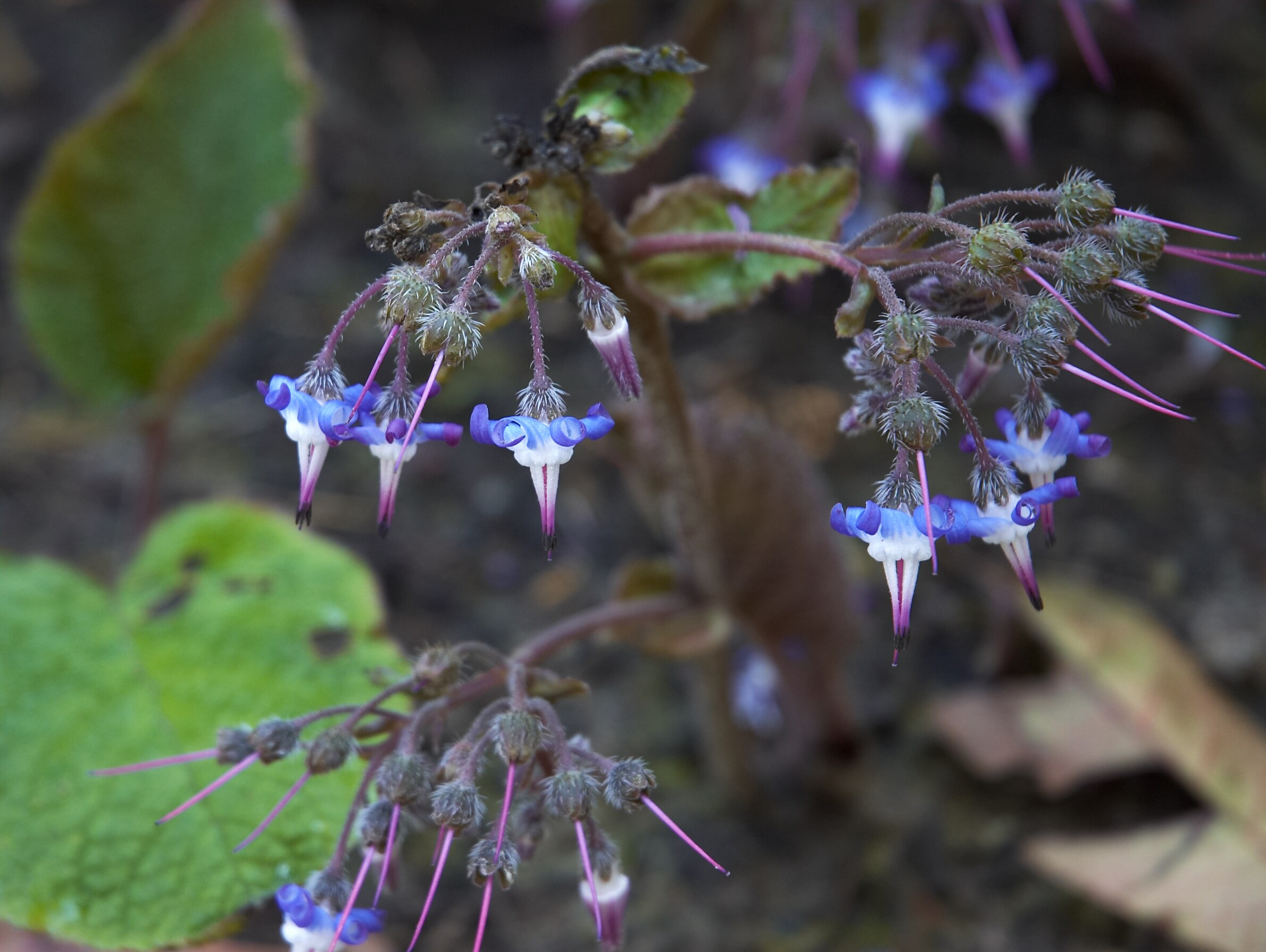

Scientific classification
- Kingdom: Plantae
- Clade: Tracheophytes
- Clade: Angiosperms
- Clade: Eudicots
- Clade: Asterids
- Order: Boraginales
- Family: Boraginaceae
- Genus: Trachystemon; D.Don
- Species: T. orientale

Binomial name
- Trachystemon orientale (L.) G.Don

= Trachystemon =

Genus of flowering plants

Trachystemon is a monotypic genus of flowering plants belonging to the family Boraginaceae. The only species is Trachystemon orientalis, commonly known as Abraham-Isaac-Jacob or early-flowering borage.

Its native range is Bulgaria to Turkey.

It is a perennial herb of the family Boraginaceae. It is frequently grown as an ornamental for its early blue-violet flowers and large leaves. It quickly spreads to provide a dense groundcover. "Trachystemon" is derived from the Greek "trachys", meaning rough, and "stemon", a stamen. The specific epithet, "orientalis" means eastern or from the orient, and is a reference to the native distribution of this species. Trachystemon orientalis is endemic to southeastern Europe and western Asia. In Turkey it is known as Kalidirk dolmasi and leaves are traditionally eaten as a spinach-like vegetable.
