= Diclybothriidea =

Scientific classification
- Kingdom: Animalia
- Phylum: Platyhelminthes
- Class: Monogenea
- Subclass: Polyopisthocotylea
- Order: Diclybothriidea

Order of flatworms

Diclybothriidea is an order of monogeneans in the subclass Polyopisthocotylea.

== Families ==
- Diclybothriidae Bychowsky & Gusev, 1950
- Hexabothriidae Price, 1942
