= Northumberland Formation =

- Stratigraphic range: Late Cretaceous, ?Campanian–Maastrichtian
- Type: Geological formation
- Unit of: Nanaimo Group
- Underlies: Spray Formation

Location
- Coordinates: 49.6°N 124.7°W
- Approximate paleocoordinates: 56.1°N 94.4°W
- Country: Canada

The Northumberland Formation is a Late Cretaceous (?Campanian-?Maastrichtian)-aged geologic formation in Canada. It belongs to the larger Nanaimo Group. Indeterminate bird and pterosaur fossils have been recovered from the formation, as well as a potential gladius of Eromangateuthis. An extensive diversity of shark teeth is known from the formation; many appear to be closely allied with modern deep-water shark taxa, suggesting a deep-water environment for the formation. The most well-known exposures of the formation are on Hornby Island.

== Vertebrate paleofauna ==
=== Cartilaginous fish ===
==== Hybodontiformes ====
Genus	Species	Location	Abundance	Notes	Images
Meristodonoides	M. sp.			A hybodontid shark.	

==== Hexanchiformes ====
Genus	Species	Location	Abundance	Notes	Images
Chlamydoselachus	C. balli			A chlamydoselachid shark, related to the modern frilled shark.	
Rolfodon	R. ludvigseni			A chlamydoselachid shark.	
Rolfodon	R. cf. thompsoni			A chlamydoselachid shark.	
Dykeius	D. garethi			A very large chlamydoselachid shark.	
Hexanchus	H. microdon			A cow shark related to the modern bluntnose sixgill shark.	
Notidanodon	N. pectinatus			A cow shark.	
Xampylodon	X. dentatus			A large cow shark.	
Protoheptranchias	P. lowei			A cow shark similar to the modern sharpnose sevengill shark.	
Paraorthacodus	P. rossi			A paraorthacodontid shark.	
Komoksodon	K. kwutchakuth			A komoksodontid shark.	

==== Echinorhiniformes ====
Genus	Species	Location	Abundance	Notes	Images
Echinorhinus	E. lapaoi			A echinorhinid shark, related to the modern bramble shark.	

==== Squaliformes ====
Genus	Species	Location	Abundance	Notes	Images
Eoetmopterus	E. supercretaceus			An etmopterid shark similar to modern lantern sharks.	
Squalus	S. vondermarcki			A dogfish shark, related to modern spurdogs.	
Squalus	S. nicholsae			A dogfish shark, related to modern spurdogs.	
Squalus	S. sp.			A dogfish shark, related to modern spurdogs.	
Centrosqualus	C. mustardi			A dogfish shark.	
Protocentrophorus	P. steviae			A dogfish shark.	
Rhinoscymnus	R. clarki			A sleeper shark, possibly included within Somniosus.	
Centroscymnus	C. sp.			A sleeper shark related to the modern Portuguese dogfish.	
Squaliodalatias	S. savoiei			A dalatiid shark.	
Hessinodon	H. wardi			A possibly dalatiid shark.	

==== Pristiophoriformes ====
Genus	Species	Location	Abundance	Notes	Images
Pristiophorus	P. smithi			A sawshark.	
Pristiophorus	P. pricei			A sawshark.	

==== Orectolobiformes ====
Genus	Species	Location	Abundance	Notes	Images
Plicatoscyllium	P. cf. globidens			A ginglymostomatid shark.	
Hemiscyllium	H. hermani			A bamboo shark.	

==== Lamniformes ====
Genus	Species	Location	Abundance	Notes	Images
Carcharias	C. dominguei			A sand shark, related to the modern sand tiger shark.	

==== Synechodontiformes ====
Genus	Species	Location	Abundance	Notes	Images
Synechodus	S. dereki			A palaeospinacid shark.	

==== Carcharhiniformes ====
Genus	Species	Location	Abundance	Notes	Images
Scyliorhinidae indent.				A catshark of uncertain affinities.	
Florenceodon	F. johnyi			A florenceodontid shark.	

=== Bony fish ===
Genus	Species	Location	Abundance	Notes	Images
Gwawinapterus	G. beardi		Jaw.	A saurodontid ichthyodectiform, initially identified as an istiodactylid pterosaur.	

=== Birds ===
Genus	Species	Location	Abundance	Notes	Images
Maaqwi	M. cascadensis		Coracoid and wing bones.	A large ornithuran, either a vegaviid or a Procellariiform.	
Enantiornithes indet.	indeterminate		Incomplete left femur, tibiotarsus and fibula.	An enanthiornithine avialan.	

=== Pterosaurs ===
Genus	Species	Location	Abundance	Notes	Images
Azhdarchoidea indet.				A possibly azhdarchid pterosaur.	

=== Squamates ===
Genus	Species	Location	Abundance	Notes	Images
Mosasauridae indet.				A mosasaur.	

== Invertebrate paleofauna ==
=== Molluscs ===
==== Cephalopods ====
Genus	Species	Location	Abundance	Notes	Images
Baculites	B. occidentalis			A baculitid ammonite.	
Fresvillia	F. constricta			A baculitid ammonite.	
Diplomoceras	D. cylindraceum			A diplomoceratid ammonite.	
Diplomoceras	D. cf. cylindraceum			A diplomoceratid ammonite.	
Exiteloceras	E. densicostatum			A diplomoceratid ammonite.	
Exiteloceras	E. bipunctatum			A diplomoceratid ammonite.	
Phylloptychoceras	P. horitai			A diplomoceratid ammonite.	
Solenoceras	S. exornatus			A diplomoceratid ammonite.	
Solenoceras	S. cf. reesidei			A diplomoceratid ammonite.	
Nostoceras	N. adrotans			A nostoceratid ammonite.	
Nostoceras	N. hornbyensis			A nostoceratid ammonite.	
Nostoceras	N. aff. pauper			A nostoceratid ammonite.	
Enchoteuthis	E. sp.			A muensterellid octopodiform.	
Eromangateuthis	E. soniae?			A plesioteuthid octopodiform.	
Cyrtobelus	C. hornbyense			A groenlandibelid spirulid.	
Actinosepia	A. canadensis			An actinosepiid vampyromorphid.	
Cirroteuthidae indet.			Gladius.	A cirroteuthid octopus.	

==== Gastropods ====
Genus	Species	Location	Abundance	Notes	Images
Tessarolax	T. louellae			An aporrhaid gastropod.	

=== Crustaceans ===
Genus	Species	Location	Abundance	Notes	Images
Neocallichirus	N. manningi			A callianassid decapod.	
Longusorbis	L. cuniculosus			A longusorbiid decapod.	
Bournelyreidus	B. grahamae			A raninoid decapod.	

== Paleoflora ==
=== Gymnosperms ===
Genus	Species	Location	Abundance	Notes	Images
Cunninghamia	C. hornbyensis		Permineralized wigs and leaves.	A member of the extant Cupressaceae genus Cunninghamia. Closely resembles extant species.	
Cycadeoidea	C. maccafferyii			A bennettitalean.	

=== Angiosperms ===
Genus	Species	Location	Abundance	Notes	Images
Atli	A. morinii		Stem	A member of the Ranunculales with a liana-like growth habit.	
Comoxia	C. multiporosa		Stem	A liana of uncertain affinities.	

== See also ==
- List of pterosaur-bearing stratigraphic units
