= Dykeius =

Dykeius Temporal range: Late Campanian

Scientific classification
- Kingdom: Animalia
- Phylum: Chordata
- Class: Chondrichthyes
- Subclass: Elasmobranchii
- Division: Selachii
- Order: Hexanchiformes
- Family: Chlamydoselachidae
- Genus: †Dykeius; Cappetta, Morrison & Adnet, 2019
- Species: †D. garethi

Binomial name
- †Dykeius garethi Cappetta, Morrison & Adnet, 2019

Extinct genus of large shark

Dykeius is an extinct genus of large shark in the family Chlamydoselachidae. It contains a single known species, D. garethi, from the Late Cretaceous Northumberland Formation of Canada. The genus and species names honor paleontologist Gareth J. Dyke.

It was a gigantic relative of the modern frilled shark (genus Chlamydoselachus). The teeth are much larger than those of any other known chlamydoselachid species, and comparison with modern frilled sharks estimates a total body size of at least 7 metres (23 ft).

As with modern frilled sharks, it appears to have inhabited a deepwater environment. It is one of several giant frilled sharks known from the Late Cretaceous, along with Rolfodon goliath and undescribed taxa known from teeth, suggesting that such large sharks were not uncommon. It may have been specialized to hunt large cephalopods such as certain belemnites and ammonites, and eventually went extinct due to the disappearance of its prey.
