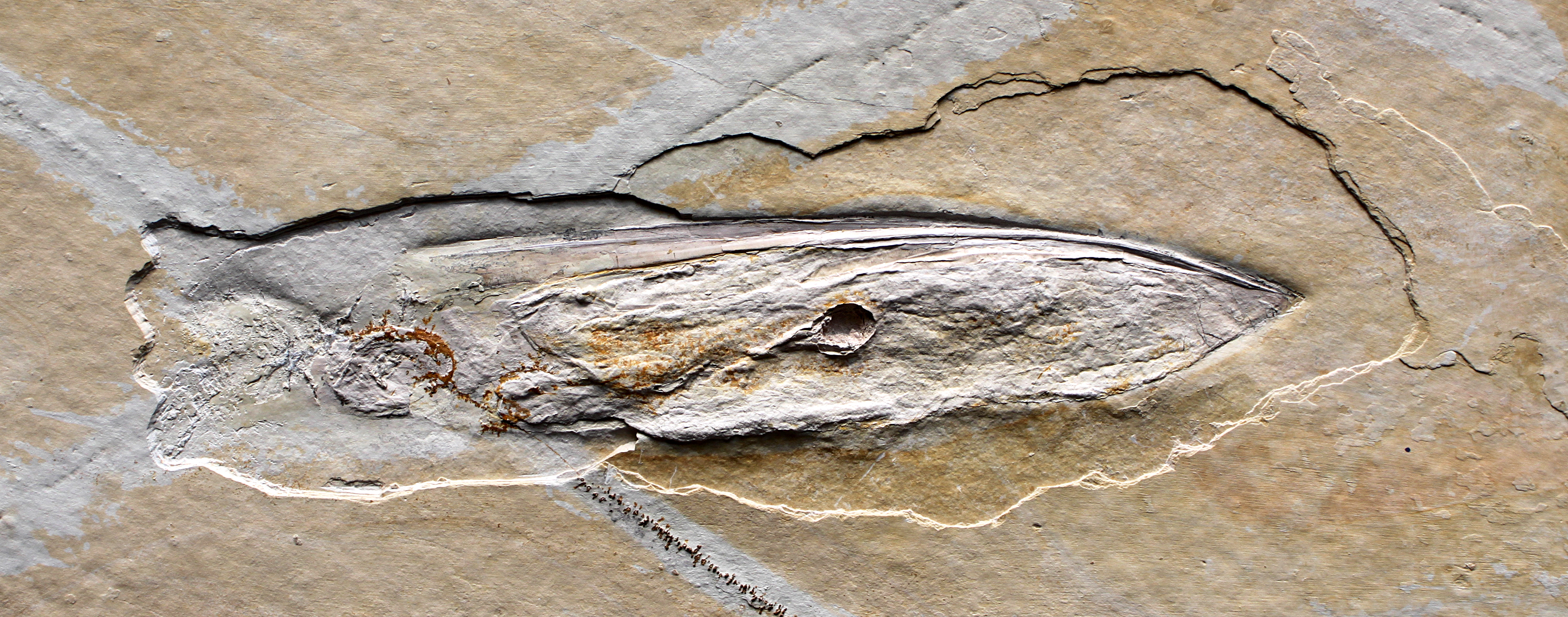
- Fossil of Plesioteuthis prisca

Scientific classification
- Kingdom: Animalia
- Phylum: Mollusca
- Class: Cephalopoda
- Family: †Plesioteuthididae
- Genus: †Plesioteuthis; Wagner, 1859

= Plesioteuthis =

Plesioteuthis Temporal range: Upper Jurassic

Extinct genus of squids

Plesioteuthis is an extinct genus of squids, belonging to the family Plesioteuthididae. This genus was first described in 1859, and its fossils were found in the well-known Solnhofen field in Germany.

== Species ==
Species within this genus include:

- Plesioteuthis prisca (the type species) (Rueppel, 1829) †
- Plesioteuthis subovata (G.G. Münster, 1846 ) †

The Plesioteuthis arcuata is not considered a member of this genus. Together with its close relatives (including Rhomboteuthis, Dorateuthis and Boreopeltis) this animal has often been considered an archaic relative of the octopus (Octopodiformes) due to the fact that more than eight tentacles have never been found in fossils. However, the structure of the beak of Plesioteuthis resembles that of the Decapodiformes.

== Fossil record ==
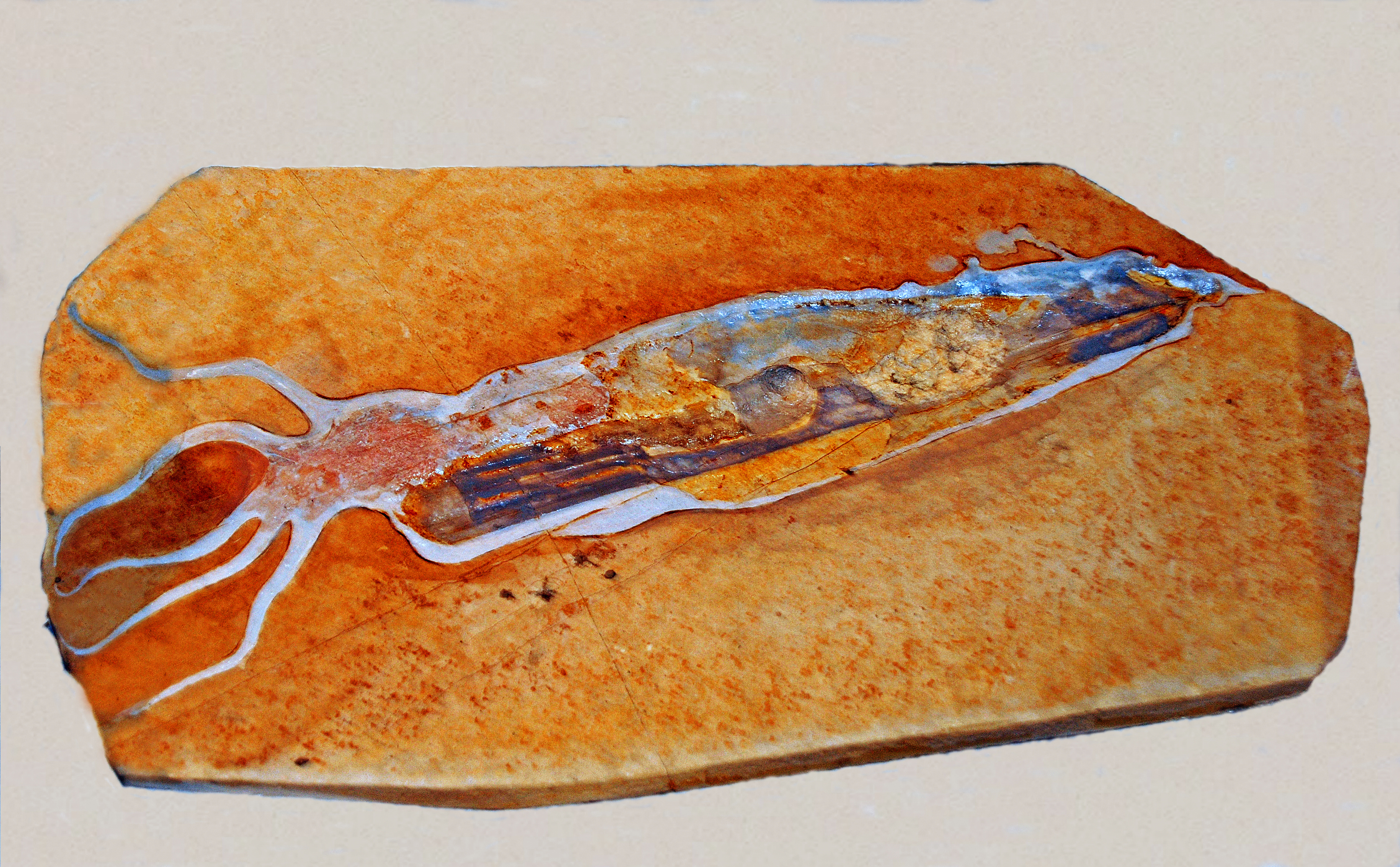
Fossil of Plesioteuthis prisca, Jurassic of Solnhofen, Germany

These squids lived in the Tithonian, Upper Jurassic (Age range from 155.7 to 150.8 million years ago) and their fossils were found in Germany.

== Description ==
These animals were very similar to the current cuttlefish, but they had a thinner stream-lined body of considerable size. The only "cuttlefish bone" or gladius could reach a length of about 30 cm (12 in).

In fossils usually the gladius is crushed or flattened, so as to hide the small stabilizers present towards the back. Traces of the tentacles are often preserved.

Next to them sometimes there are traces of the beak and mouth. Some phosphatizations of the soft parts preserve the strong striations on the gladius, on the back of the animal.

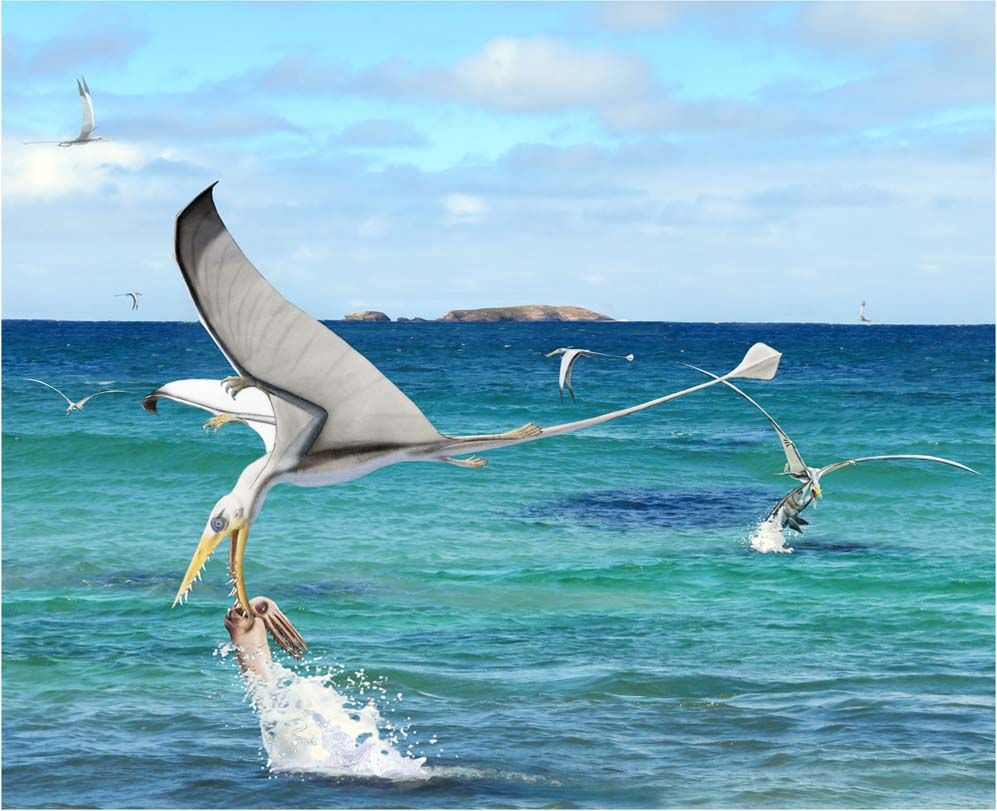
P. subovata being eaten by a Rhamphorhynchus

In the middle of the body there was an organ similar to a button, often preserved in a darker color than the rest of the fossil. This structure was the ink-sack.

== Biology ==
They were fast-moving nektonic carnivores living in lagoons, in shallow subtidal water and reefs.

== Bibliography ==
- Fuchs, D., Klinghammer, A., & Keupp, H. 2007. Taxonomy, morphology and phylogeny of plesioteuthidid coleoids from the Upper Jurassic (Tithonian) Plattenkalks of Solnhofen. Neues Jahrbuch für Geologie und Paläontologie, Abhandlungen 245(2): 239–252.
- Klug, C; Schweigert, G; Dietl, G (2010). A new Plesioteuthis with beak from the Kimmeridgian of Nusplingen (Germany). Ferrantia, 59:73-77.
