= Chlamydoselachus garmani =

Chlamydoselachus garmani Temporal range: Neogene

Scientific classification
- Kingdom: Animalia
- Phylum: Chordata
- Class: Chondrichthyes
- Subclass: Elasmobranchii
- Division: Selachii
- Order: Hexanchiformes
- Family: Chlamydoselachidae
- Genus: Chlamydoselachus
- Species: C. garmani

Binomial name
- Chlamydoselachus garmani Welton, 1983

Extinct species of shark

Chlamydoselachus garmani is an extinct species of large frilled shark from the Miocene. Fossils have been found in Germany.

== Description ==
The teeth of Chlamydoselachus garmani are almost twice the size of the extant C. anguineus, making it a possible 2.7-3.6 m (9-12 ft) long and its roots meso-distally broad and labio-lingually short.
