= Rhomboteuthis lehmani =

Rhomboteuthis lehmani Temporal range: Lower Callovian
- Rhomboteuthis lehmani specimen LPMP–R.3758 and restoration showing position of ink sac and gladius.

Scientific classification
- Kingdom: Animalia
- Phylum: Mollusca
- Class: Cephalopoda
- Family: †Plesioteuthididae
- Genus: †Rhomboteuthis
- Species: †R. lehmani

Binomial name
- †Rhomboteuthis lehmani Fischer & Riou, 1982

Extinct species of squid

Rhomboteuthis lehmani is an extinct species of squid, currently the only described member of its genus. R. lehmani is known from the Lower Callovian (165–164 Ma) of Voulte-sur-Rhône, Ardèche, France.

Radiography was used to locate the position of the ink sac and gladius (pen) of the pictured specimen.

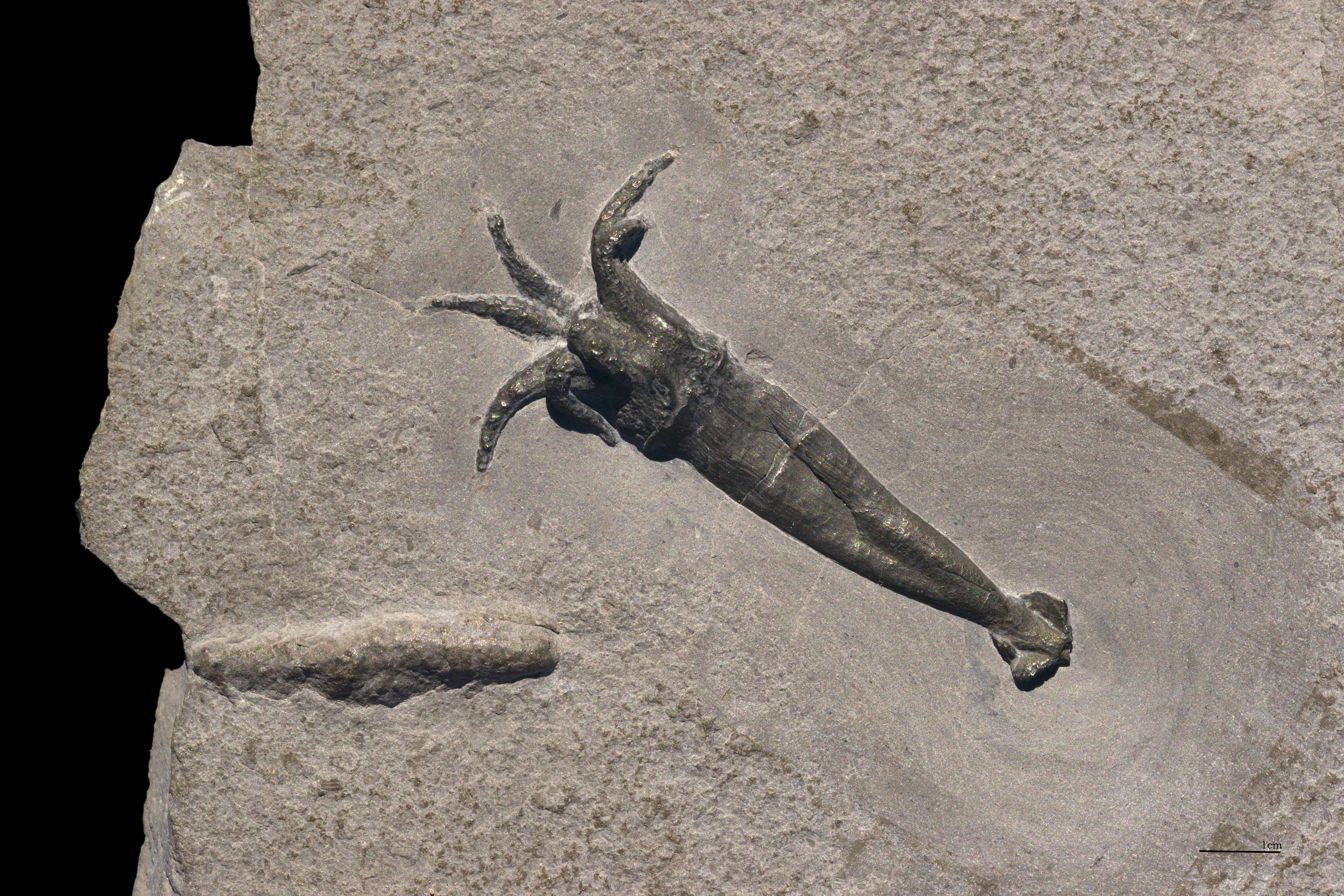
Fossil Rhomboteuthis lehmani
