= Southern African frilled shark =

Conservation status
- Least Concern (IUCN 3.1)

Scientific classification
- Kingdom: Animalia
- Phylum: Chordata
- Class: Chondrichthyes
- Subclass: Elasmobranchii
- Division: Selachii
- Order: Hexanchiformes
- Family: Chlamydoselachidae
- Genus: Chlamydoselachus
- Species: C. africana

Binomial name
- Chlamydoselachus africana Ebert & Compagno, 2009
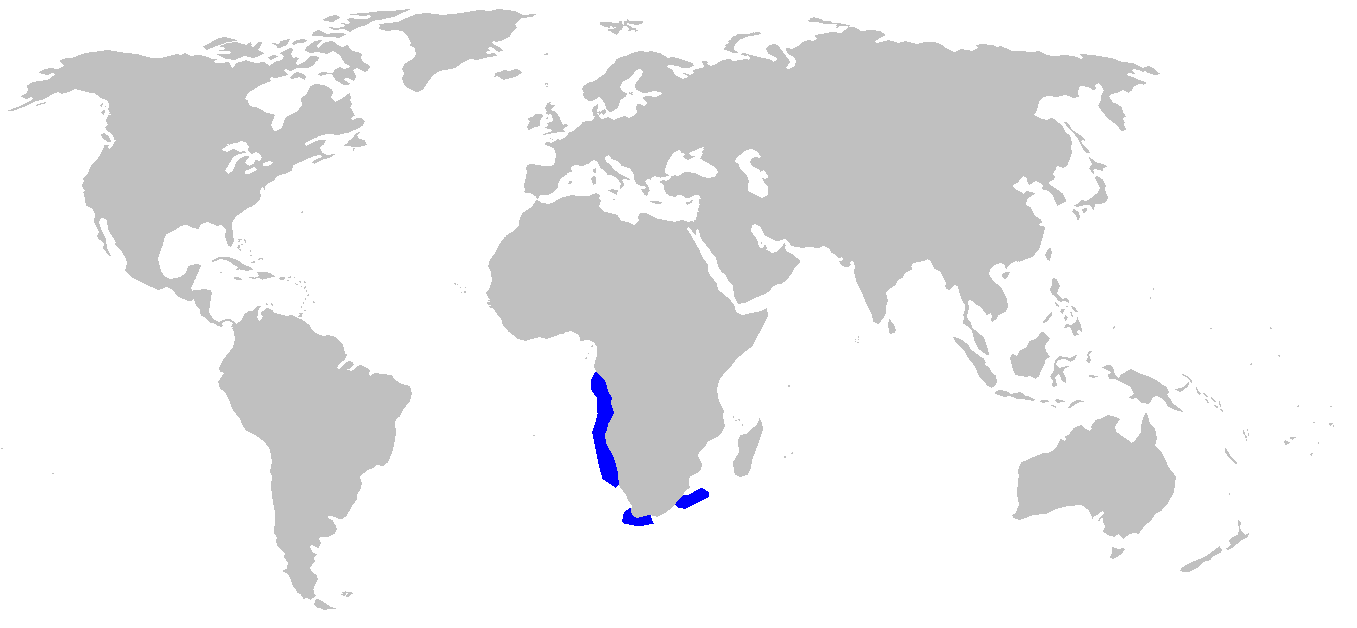
- Range of the southern African frilled shark

Species of shark

The Southern African frilled shark (Chlamydoselachus africana) is a species of shark in the family Chlamydoselachidae, described in 2009. It is found in the deep waters off southern Angola to southern Namibia. This species is difficult to distinguish from the better-known frilled shark (C. anguineus), but is smaller at maturity and differs in several proportional measurements including head length and mouth width. It seems to be a specialized predator of smaller sharks, using its flexible jaws and numerous needle-like, recurved teeth to capture and swallow them whole. Reproduction is presumably aplacental viviparous, as with the other member of its family.

== Taxonomy ==
The frilled shark (C. anguineus) was long thought to be the only extant member of its genus and family. The existence of a second Chlamydoselachus species off southern Africa was first suspected from a specimen caught off Lüderitz, Namibia in February 1988, by the South African research ship FRS Africana (after which this species would eventually be named). The specimen was an adult male smaller than other known mature C. anguineus, and subsequent investigations revealed other consistent differences between frilled sharks in this region and C. anguineus. The new species was termed Chlamydoselachus "sp. A", before being formally described in 2009 by David Ebert and Leonard Compagno, in a paper for the scientific journal Zootaxa. The holotype was a 117 cm (46 in) long immature female caught at a depth of 409 m (1,342 ft) off the Cunene River, Namibia, by the research vessel Benguela.

== Distribution and habitat ==
The southern African frilled shark is found from off the coast of southern Angola to Namibia. Frilled sharks have also been captured off South Africa, at 1,230–1,400 m (4,040–4,590 ft) deep off Eastern Cape Province, and at 300 m (980 ft) deep off KwaZulu-Natal Province; it is uncertain whether these specimens are C. africana. Little is known of its habitat preferences; one known specimen was caught 425 m (1,394 ft) down in a zone of low dissolved oxygen and high nutrients, over a soft substrate.

== Description ==
The southern African frilled shark looks very similar to the frilled shark, with a long snake-like body and a broad, flattened head. The eyes are large and rounded. The sizable mouth is placed terminally on the blunt snout, containing around 30 tooth rows in the upper jaw and 27 tooth rows in the lower jaw. Each tooth has three slender, smooth, recurved cusps, with tiny cusplets between them, and a base that interlocks with the tooth behind it. There are six pairs of long gill slits, with the first pair meeting over the throat. The pectoral fins are broad and rounded, originating just behind the sixth gill slit. The pelvic and anal fins are large with long bases and curved margins. The single dorsal fin is set far back on the body over the anal fin, and has a short base. The caudal fin is low and somewhat triangular, without a lower lobe.

Compared to the frilled shark, the southern African frilled shark has several proportional differences, including a longer head and gill slits, more widely spaced eyes and nares, broader mouth, and a greater distance between the head and the pectoral fins. The largest known female is the immature 117 cm (46 in) long holotype, and the largest known males measure 99 cm (39 in) long. In life the shark is dark gray, but covered with a thin membrane that gives it a uniform dark brown color.

While it is similar to the frilled shark externally, there are several internal differences between the two species. The Southern African frilled shark has fewer vertebral centra (147 compared to 160-171) and the transition between monospondylous precaudal (MP) centra and diplospondylous precaudal (DP) centra happens earlier (at the 18th centra (at the end of the pectoral fins) compared to the 72-75th centra (around the pelvic fins). They also have fewer spiral intestinal valve (26-28 compared to 35-49). Although the sample size is limited, the Southern African frilled shark also seems to have a different pectoral fin skeletal structure (such as having more radial segments) and has more radials in the anal fin.

== Biology and ecology ==
=== Diet ===
From stomach contents, the southern African frilled shark seems to feed mainly on smaller sharks such as the African sawtail catshark (Galeus polli). Its jaws, buccal cavity, and abdomen are all highly distensible, suggesting that this shark is specialized for capturing and swallowing whole large prey, with its rows of needle-like, recurved teeth preventing escape. One 92 cm (36 in) long specimen was found to have swallowed a ghost catshark (Apristurus sp.) that measured 40% of its body length.

=== Reproduction ===
Although adult females are unknown, the southern African frilled shark is presumed to be aplacental viviparous like the frilled shark. Males mature sexually at a length of 91.5 cm (36.0 in).

== Human interactions ==
The conservation status of the southern African frilled shark has been evaluated as least concern by the International Union for Conservation of Nature (IUCN).
