= Rhomboteuthis =

Rhomboteuthis Temporal range: Lower Callovian
- Rhomboteuthis lehmani specimen LPMP–R.3758 and restoration showing position of ink sac and gladius.

Scientific classification
- Kingdom: Animalia
- Phylum: Mollusca
- Class: Cephalopoda
- Family: †Plesioteuthididae
- Genus: †Rhomboteuthis; Fischer & Riou, 1982

Species
- †Rhomboteuthis lehmani

Extinct species of squid

Rhomboteuthis is an extinct species of squid, with Rhomboteuthis lehmani currently being the only described member of the genus. Rhomboteuthis is known from Mid-Jurassic fossils from Voulte-sur-Rhône, Ardèche, France.
