= Hessinodon =

Hessinodon Temporal range: Campanian

Scientific classification
- Domain: Eukaryota
- Kingdom: Animalia
- Phylum: Chordata
- Class: Chondrichthyes
- Subclass: Elasmobranchii
- Division: Selachii
- Order: Squaliformes
- Family: Dalatiidae
- Genus: †Hessinodon; Cappetta, Morrison, & Adnet, 2021
- Species: †H. wardi

Binomial name
- †Hessinodon wardi Cappetta, Morrison, & Adnet, 2021

Extinct genus of sharks

Hessinodon is an extinct genus of possible kitefin sharks that lived during the Late Cretaceous. It contains one valid species, H. wardi, which is known from four teeth from the Northumberland Formation of British Columbia. Its teeth are most similar to those of modern cookiecutter sharks.
