= Eromangateuthis =

Eromangateuthis Temporal range: Albian (possible Campanian record)

Scientific classification
- Kingdom: Animalia
- Phylum: Mollusca
- Class: Cephalopoda
- Family: †Plesioteuthididae
- Genus: †Eromangateuthis; Fuchs, 2019
- Species: †E. soniae

Binomial name
- †Eromangateuthis soniae (Wade, 1993)

Synonyms
- Boreopeltis soniae Wade, 1993

Genus of Cretaceous cephalopods

Eromangateuthis is an extinct genus of large plesioteuthidid cephalopod from the Cretaceous of Australia and possibly Canada.

== Description ==
Eromangateuthis soniae is known from several gladii found in the Allaru Formation of Queensland and a potential gladius from the Northumberland Formation of British Columbia. It was originally described in 1993 as Boreopeltis soniae, but was moved to its own genus in 2019 based on multiple differences between it and the type species of Boreopeltis. The generic name is derived from the Eromanga Basin in which it was discovered and the Ancient Greek teuthís (τευθίς, 'squid'). One gladius suggests it had a mantle length of 1.2 meters. This makes Eromangateuthis the largest known plesioteuthidid, with a mantle length over twice as long as the second largest, Boreopeltis ifrimae.
