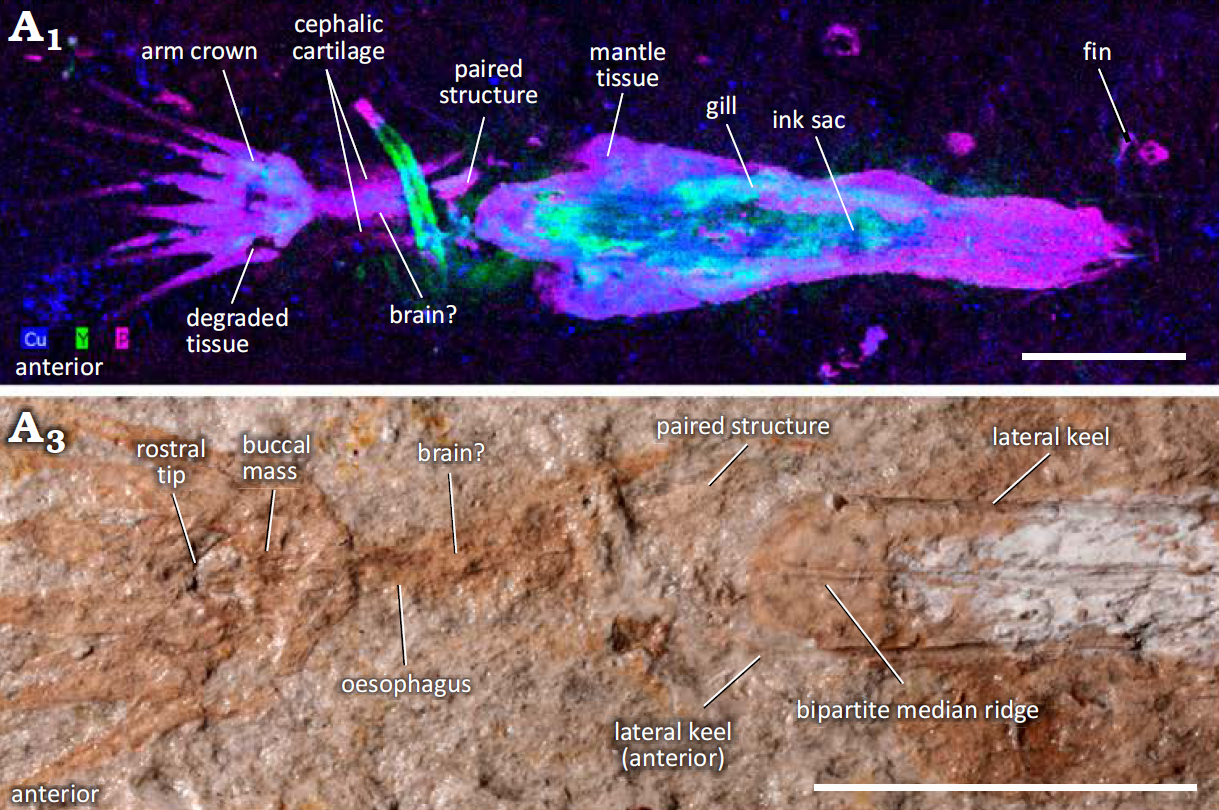
- Holotype of Dorateuthis syriaca, photographed under μXRF overlay (top) and as in life (bottom)

Scientific classification
- Domain: Eukaryota
- Kingdom: Animalia
- Phylum: Mollusca
- Class: Cephalopoda
- Family: †Plesioteuthididae
- Genus: †Dorateuthis; Woodward, 1883
- Species: †D. syriaca

Binomial name
- †Dorateuthis syriaca Woodward, 1883

= Dorateuthis =

Dorateuthis Temporal range: Late Santonian

Extinct genus of molluscs

Dorateuthis is a genus of cephalopod from the Upper Santonian shale of Late Cretaceous Lebanon. Though traditionally regarded as a plesioteuthidid squid, it may instead be a member of the suborder Prototeuthina, the earliest-diverging branch of Octopoda. Dorateuthis was small, with a mantle length of 5–40 cm (2.0–15.7 in). The contents of its digestive system suggest that it may have fed on small fishes and been an active predator.

== Taxonomy ==
=== Early history ===
The holotype of Dorateuthis, a near-complete specimen (BMNH C5017) was discovered in the Sahel Alma fossil site, near Beirut, Lebanon, then part of Syria. It entered the collection of Reverend Edwin R. Lewis, a professor in the American University of Beirut (then the Syrian Protestant College), where it subsequently came to the attention of British geologist Robert Damon. Damon brought the fossil to a fellow geologist, Henry Woodward, who was at the time writing about fossil crustaceans recovered from Sahel Alma. In 1883, Woodward described the specimen, assigning it to a new genus and species, Dorateuthis syriaca. The generic name derives from the Greek δόρυ ("spear") and τευθίς ("squid"), while the species name refers to Syria.

=== Other species ===
Several other taxa have been assigned or reassigned to Dorateuthis since its description. D. sahilalmae was named by Adolf Naef in 1922, though appears to be a junior synonym of D. syraica. The same is true of Neololigosepia and multiple species from Plesioteuthis.

== Description ==
Dorateuthis was a small to medium-sized plesioteuthidid, with a mantle ranging from 5–40 cm (2.0–15.7 in) in length. Sexual dimorphism does not appear to have influenced body size. The fins on either side of the mantle were oar-shaped. The gladius was quite slender, though was subject to individual variation, ranging from 0.22–3.18 cm (0.087–1.252 in) in width. The eyes were quite prominent, and judging from the size of the cephalic cartilage and its relation to eye size, the eyes of smaller specimens may have been around 0.13–0.25 mm (0.0051–0.0098 in). Eight arms were present, with the dorsal pair being the longest. Whilst not preserved on the holotype, suckers are present on other specimens. The fins on either side of the mantle have been described as oar-shaped or ear-shaped.

=== Internal anatomy ===
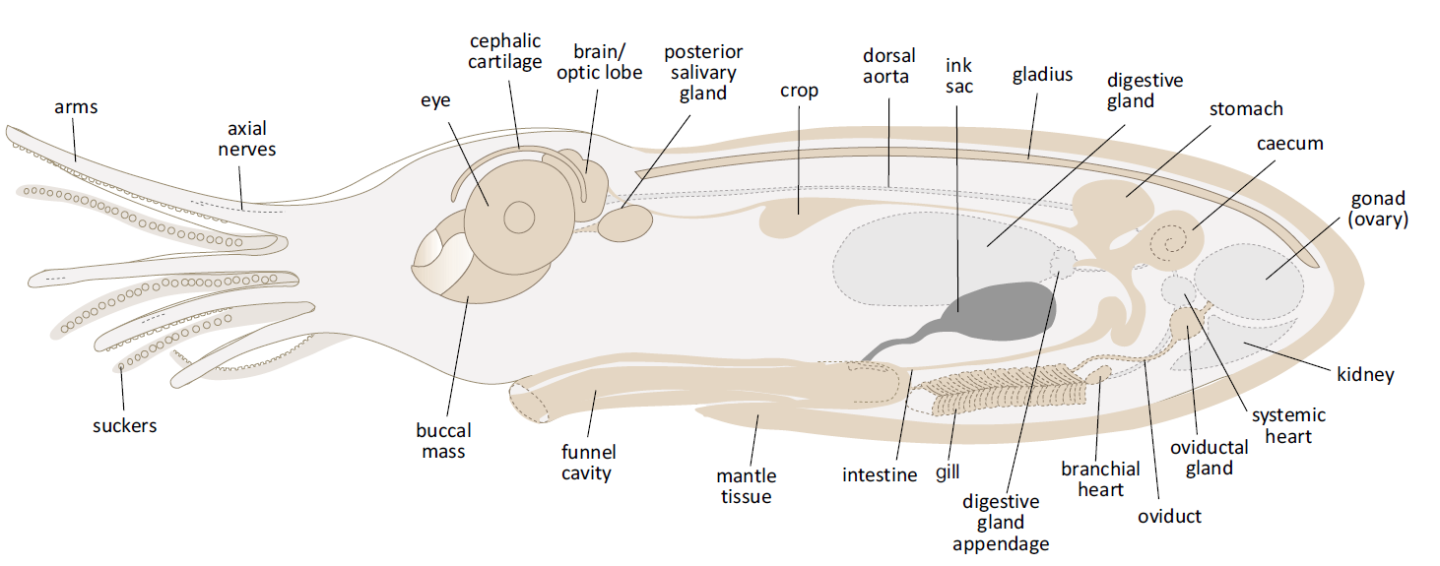
Reconstructed arm morphology and internal anatomy of Dorateuthis syriaca.

Behind the cephalic cartilage of Dorateuthis is a mass of soft tissue that corresponds with the oesophagus, and may represent either the optic lobes or the rest of the brain. Three specimens preserve elements of the axial nervous system, which extended to the tips of the arms. Statocysts, small organs used for orientation, are preserved in some specimens, immediately behind the cephalic cartilage. Gills are preserved in four Dorateuthis specimens, though little detail be discerned. Most specimens preserve a buccal mass, the structure that anchors the beak. The digestive system was similar to that of octobrachians. Like the vampire squid, it possessed a crop, which is absent in decabrachians such as squids. The stomach of one specimen preserves fin rays and a pelvic girdle from a teleost, and fish bones were found in the caecum and another part of the digestive system, suggesting that Dorateuthis predated on them. Putative spermatophores were described by J. Roger in 1946, though were subsequently shown to be digestive contents. However, one specimen may preserve oviducts.

== Palaeobiology ==
Dorateuthis' gladius bore prominent lateral keels, similar to the contemporary Boreopeltis, which likely increased overall rigidity. This, its prominent eyes, and the presence of fish remains in its digestive tract, suggest that Dorateuthis was an active predator.
