= Rolfodon =

Rolfodon Temporal range: Santonian–Early Pliocene

Scientific classification
- Kingdom: Animalia
- Phylum: Chordata
- Class: Chondrichthyes
- Subclass: Elasmobranchii
- Division: Selachii
- Order: Hexanchiformes
- Family: Chlamydoselachidae
- Genus: †Rolfodon; Cappetta, Morrison & Adnet, 2019

Species
- See text

Synonyms
- Thrinax Pfeil, 1983 non Thrinax Konow, 1885; Proteothrinax Pfeil, 2012

Extinct genus of shark

Rolfodon is an extinct genus of shark in the family Chlamydoselachidae. It is closely related to the extant frilled sharks in the genus Chlamydoselachus, which it can be differentiated from by tooth morphology. It is named after late Canadian paleontologist Rolf Ludvigsen.

The earliest fossil teeth of Rolfodon are known from the Late Cretaceous (Turonian/Santonian boundary) of Japan, and it is one of two genera of Chlamydoselachidae along with Chlamydoselachus known to have survived the Cretaceous–Paleogene extinction event, although unlike Chlamydoselachus, Rolfodon went extinct by the Early Pliocene. Remains are known from worldwide, including Japan, Canada, Austria, New Zealand, Angola, Ecuador, and Antarctica. As with modern frilled sharks, Rolfodon appears to have been specialized to deep-water environments.

== Species ==
The following species are known:

- R. bracheri (Pfeil, 1983) – Early Miocene (Aquitanian to Burdigalian) of Austria, Germany & Japan
- R. fiedleri (Pfeil, 1983) – Late Eocene (Bartonian) of Austria
- R. goliath (Antunes & Cappetta, 2002) – Late Cretaceous (Campanian) of Angola
- R. keyesi (Mannering & Hiller 2008) – Early Paleocene of New Zealand
- R. landinii (Carrillo-Briceño et al. 2014) – Middle Miocene (Langhian to Serravallian) of Ecuador
- R. ludvigseni Cappetta, Morrison & Adnet, 2019 – Campanian of British Columbia, Canada (Northumberland Formation)
- R. tatere (Consoli, 2008) – Late Cretaceous (Maastrichtian) to Early Paleocene of New Zealand and Antarctica
- R. thomsoni (Richter & Ward, 1990) – Maastrichtian of Antarctica

The majority of these species were previously classified in Chlamydoselachus. One species, Chlamydoselachus baumgartneri, was moved to its own genus Proteothrinax in 2012. P. baumgartneri was later found to be conspecific with the previously described C. fiedleri, but fiedleri was found to belong to Rolfodon by Cappeta et al (2019).

In addition to the genus as a whole, one individual species is also known to have survived the Cretaceous-Paleogene extinction event: R. tatere, which was first described from the Early Paleocene of New Zealand and was later also identified from the Late Cretaceous of Antarctica, extending the record of its existence by over 10 million years.

R. bracheri from the Early Miocene was one of the most widespread species, with fossil teeth known from the European Paratethys and from Japan. The last records of Rolfodon are indeterminate teeth from the Early Pliocene of Japan.

R. goliath, from the Late Campanian of Angola's southern Benguela Basin, could grow to very large sizes. It was described by Miguel Telles Antunes and Henri Cappetta in 2002 during the beginning stages of the PaleoAngola project. The holotype, MUS ANG 23, is rather large. This tooth is about 20mm high, and is characterised by straightened, upright cusps with smooth enameloid which lack ornamentation.
