= La Voulte-sur-Rhône =

- Commune
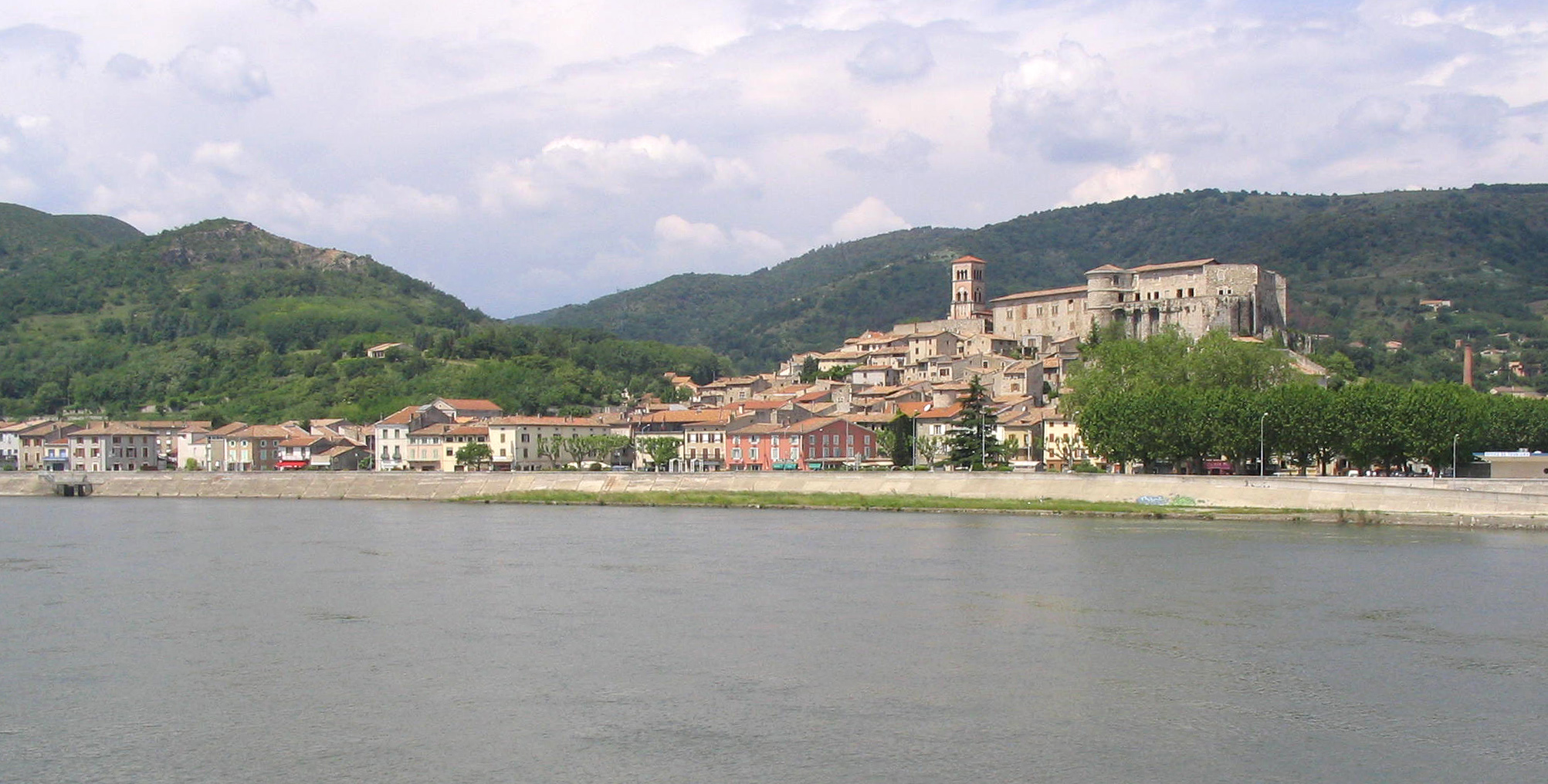
- La Voulte-sur-Rhône seen from across the river

- Coat of arms
- Location of La Voulte-sur-Rhône
- Location within France Location within Auvergne-Rhône-Alpes
- Coordinates: 44°48′01″N 4°46′48″E
- Country: France
- Region: Auvergne-Rhône-Alpes
- Department: Ardèche
- Arrondissement: Privas
- Canton: Rhône-Eyrieux
- Intercommunality: CA Privas Centre Ardèche

Government
  - Mayor (2020–2026): Bernard Brottes
- Area^{1}: 9.70 km^{2} (3.75 sq mi)
- Elevation: 98 m (322 ft)
- Highest elevation: 405 m (1,329 ft)
- Lowest elevation: 85 m (279 ft)
- Population (2023): 4,854
  - Density: 500/km^{2} (1,300/sq mi)
- Time zone: UTC+01:00 (CET)
  - Summer (DST): UTC+02:00 (CEST)
- INSEE/Postal code: 07349 /07800
- ^{1} French Land Register data, which excludes lakes, ponds, glaciers > 1 km^{2} (0.386 sq mi or 247 acres) and river estuaries.

La Voulte-sur-Rhône (French pronunciation: [la vult syʁ ʁon], literally La Voulte on Rhône; Occitan: La Vòuta) is a commune in the Ardèche department in southern France.

== Population ==
Historical population

Year	Pop.	±% p.a.
1793	1,168	—
1800	1,369	+2.29%
1806	1,261	−1.36%
1821	1,419	+0.79%
1831	1,920	+3.07%
1836	2,189	+2.66%
1841	2,459	+2.35%
1846	3,155	+5.11%
1851	3,153	−0.01%
1856	3,045	−0.69%
1861	3,285	+1.53%
1866	3,160	−0.77%
1872	3,534	+1.88%
1876	4,615	+6.90%
1881	4,958	+1.44%
1886	4,219	−3.18%
1891	3,148	−5.69%
1896	2,604	−3.72%
1901	2,738	+1.01%

Year	Pop.	±% p.a.
1906	2,651	−0.64%
1911	2,760	+0.81%
1921	3,043	+0.98%
1926	4,032	+5.79%
1931	4,326	+1.42%
1936	3,113	−6.37%
1946	4,047	+2.66%
1954	4,489	+1.30%
1962	5,537	+2.66%
1968	5,978	+1.29%
1975	5,892	−0.21%
1982	5,297	−1.51%
1990	5,116	−0.43%
1999	5,168	+0.11%
2007	4,993	−0.43%
2012	5,115	+0.48%
2017	4,987	−0.51%
2023	4,854	−0.45%

Source: EHESS and INSEE (1968-2023)

== Lagerstätte ==
La Voulte-sur-Rhône is a marine Lagerstätte (sedimentary deposit) located in France. It is Middle Jurassic (Callovian) in age, and is known for the variety of fossils it produces, including cephalopods, such as Proteroctopus ribeti, Rhomboteuthis lehmani, and Vampyronassa rhodanica. Fossilized cephalopods are rare, and Voulte-sur-Rhône is prized among paleontologists as one of only a few known localities known to produce such cephalopod fossils. Fossil preservation is by pyrite, a geologically rare process. Other sites with pyrite preserved fossils are Beecher's Trilobite Bed and the Hunsrück Slate. Also found at the site are ophiuroids, crustaceans, fish, and other pyritized specimens. The exceptional preservation of the fossils at this site is most likely due to the result of oxygen deficient water at the time of the deposition of the fossils, and possibly repeated sediment blanketing.

== See also ==
- Communes of the Ardèche department
