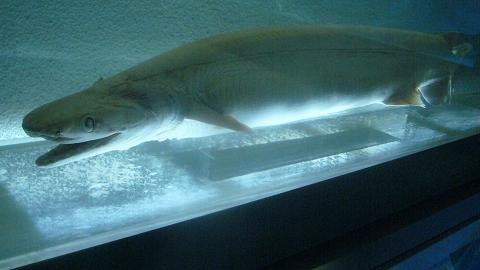
- Specimen of Chlamydoselachus anguineus from Japan

Scientific classification
- Kingdom: Animalia
- Phylum: Chordata
- Class: Chondrichthyes
- Subclass: Elasmobranchii
- Division: Selachii
- Order: Hexanchiformes; Berg and Svetovidov, 1955
- Family: Chlamydoselachidae; Garman, 1884

Genera
- Chlamydoselachus; †Rolfodon; †Dykeius

Synonyms
- Chlamydoselachiformes

= Chlamydoselachidae =

Chlamydoselachidae Temporal range: Late Cretaceous (Turonian) - present

Family of deep-sea sharks

Chlamydoselachidae is a family of primitive deep-sea sharks in the order Hexanchiformes. They are one of only two extant families in the order alongside the cow sharks in the family Hexanchidae, and the only members of the suborder Chlamydoselachoidei.

They are now represented only by two extant species in the genus Chlamydoselachus: the frilled shark (C. anguineus) and the Southern African frilled shark (C. africana). However, they are thought to have been more diverse during the Late Cretaceous, where all three extant and extinct genera are known, and one other genus (Rolfodon) survived up to the Pliocene. The earliest remains of the family are indeterminate teeth from the Turonian of Japan. Members of this family appear to have always been closely associated with deep-sea habitats. Some extinct taxa such as Rolfodon goliath and Dykeius could grow to very large sizes.

== Species ==
The following taxa are known:

- Chlamydoselachus Garman, 1884
  - Chlamydoselachus africana Ebert & Compagno, 2009 (southern African frilled shark)
  - Chlamydoselachus anguineus Garman, 1884 (frilled shark)
  - †Chlamydoselachus balli Cappetta, Morrison & Adnet, 2019
  - †Chlamydoselachus garmani Welton, 1983
  - †Chlamydoselachus gracilis Antunes & Cappetta, 2002
  - †Chlamydoselachus kamchaticus Malyshkina & Nazarkin, 2024
  - †Chlamydoselachus lawleyi Davis, 1870
  - †Chlamydoselachus tobleri Leriche, 1929
- †Dykeius Cappetta, Morrison & Adnet, 2019
  - †D. garethi Cappetta, Morrison & Adnet, 2019
- †Rolfodon Cappetta, Morrison & Adnet, 2019
  - †R. bracheri (Pfeil, 1983)
  - †R. fiedleri (Pfeil, 1983)
  - †R. goliath (Antunes & Cappetta, 2002)
  - †R. keyesi (Mannering & Hiller 2008)
  - †R. landinii (Carrillo-Briceño et al. 2014)
  - †R. ludvigseni Cappetta, Morrison & Adnet, 2019
  - †R. tatere (Consoli, 2008)
  - †R. thomsoni (Richter & Ward, 1990)
