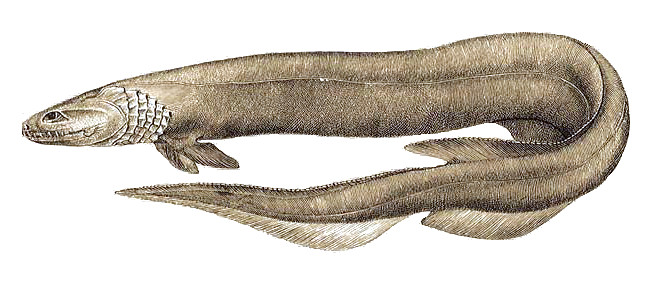
- Frilled shark (C. anguineus)

Scientific classification
- Kingdom: Animalia
- Phylum: Chordata
- Class: Chondrichthyes
- Subclass: Elasmobranchii
- Division: Selachii
- Order: Hexanchiformes
- Family: Chlamydoselachidae
- Genus: Chlamydoselachus; Garman 1884

Species
- C. anguineus; C. africana

= Chlamydoselachus =

Chlamydoselachus Temporal range: Campanian to Recent 84–0 Ma

Genus of sharks

Chlamydoselachus is a genus of sharks and the sole extant member of the family Chlamydoselachidae, in the order Hexanchiformes. It contains two extant and four extinct species. The most widely known species still surviving is the frilled shark (Chlamydoselachus anguineus). It is known as a living fossil, along with Chlamydoselachus africana, also known as the southern African frilled shark, which is only found along coastal areas of South Africa. The only two extant species of this genus are deep-sea creatures which are typically weakened in areas closer to the surface. While the two extant species are similar in external appearance, they differ internally.

The earliest known fossil members of the genus are C. gracilis from Angola and C. balli from Canada, both from the Campanian stage of the Late Cretaceous. Formations with fossil Chlamydoselachus teeth are thought to be composed of deep-sea sediments, indicating that they have long inhabited deep-sea environments. Fossil Chlamydoselachus teeth closely resemble those of modern members.

The largest species of the genus known to have existed is C. kamchaticus from the Early Eocene of Kamchatka, Russia, whose teeth are about twice the size of modern frilled shark teeth. It is one of the largest frilled sharks known to have existed, with estimated body length of 3.80 metres (12.5 ft).

== Species ==
- Chlamydoselachus africana Ebert & Compagno, 2009 (southern African frilled shark)
- Chlamydoselachus anguineus Garman, 1884 (frilled shark)
- †Chlamydoselachus balli Cappetta, Morrison & Adnet, 2019
- †Chlamydoselachus garmani Welton, 1983
- †Chlamydoselachus gracilis Antunes & Cappetta, 2002
- †Chlamydoselachus kamchaticus Malyshkina & Nazarkin, 2024
- †Chlamydoselachus lawleyi Davis, 1887
- †Chlamydoselachus tobleri Leriche, 1929

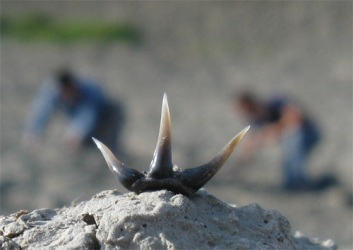
Tooth of the extinct C. lawleyi from Italy

Many other species formerly described in this genus were moved to the fossil genus Rolfodon in 2019. Chlamydoselachus and Rolfodon can be distinguished from one another by their tooth morphologies. Rolfodon also survived the Cretaceous-Paleogene extinction event but went extinct during the Miocene.
