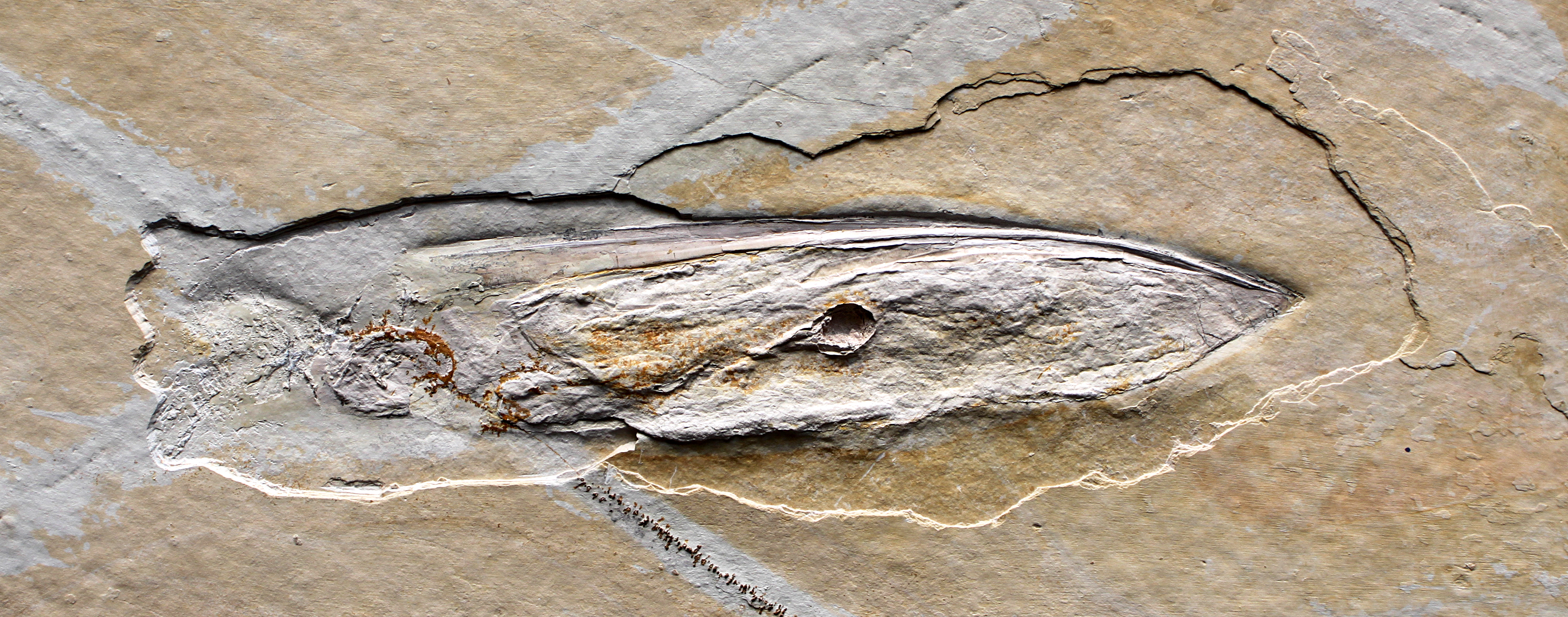
- Plesioteuthis prisca

Scientific classification
- Kingdom: Animalia
- Phylum: Mollusca
- Class: Cephalopoda
- Subclass: Coleoidea
- Division: Neocoleoidea
- Family: †Plesioteuthididae; Naef, 1921

Genera
- Boreopeltis; Dorateuthis; Eromangateuthis; Nesisoteuthis; Paraplesioteuthis; Plesioteuthis; Rhomboteuthis; Romaniteuthis

= Plesioteuthididae =

Plesioteuthididae Temporal range: Callovian–Santonian

Plesioteuthididae (sometimes shortened to Plesioteuthidae) is an extinct family of cephalopods. Although they are definite members of Coleoidea, their exact placement within the group is contentious and still under debate.

== Classification ==
Historically believed to be allied with the squid and cuttlefish in Decapodiformes (sometimes known as Decabrachia), recent fossil finds indicate that they may be more closely related to vampire squid and octopuses, as the earliest branch of Octopodiformes (alternatively known as Octobrachia).

== Description ==
Their overall anatomy is highly squid-like, with elongated mantles that possessed fins at their ends. Some genera possessed two pairs of fins on their mantles, similar to other Mesozoic cephalopods such as Trachyteuthis and juvenile vampire squid. These fins either aided in stabilization or in propulsion for the animal. Unlike squid and cuttlefish, they do not appear to have any indication of having specialized feeding tentacles. Instead, they possess only eight arms with uniserial suckers. This makes them more similar to octopuses, vampire squid, and the extant Octopoteuthidae than any conventional squid.

== Paleoecology ==
Similarly to extant squid in the order Myopsida, plesioteuthidids were fast and agile nearshore carnivores, such as the namesake Plesioteuthis. Although many were rather small cephalopods, Eromangateuthis possessed an enormous gladius that suggests a total length of ~2 meters with the head and arms, easily making it the largest member of Plesioteuthididae. Smaller genera were likely highly important sources of food for other animals in their environments. One fossil of Plesioteuthis was found with a tooth from the pterosaur Rhamphorhynchus in its mantle, which likely broke off after it dropped the plesioteuthidid in a hunting attempt.
