= Boreopeltis =

Boreopeltis Temporal range: Tithonian to Turonian Possible Santonian occurrence

Scientific classification
- Kingdom: Animalia
- Phylum: Mollusca
- Class: Cephalopoda
- Family: †Plesioteuthididae
- Genus: †Boreopeltis; Engeser & Reitner, 1985

Species
- See text

Genus of squid

Boreopeltis is an extinct genus of plesioteuthidid cephalopod, with 4 known species.

== Species ==
- Boreopeltis helgolandiae (Engeser & Reitner, 1985) from the Aptian of Helgoland, Germany.
- Boreopeltis sagittata (Naef, 1921) from the Tithonian-aged Solnhofen Formation of Germany.
- Boreopeltis smithi (A. Fuchs & Larson, 2011) from the late Cenomanian-aged Sannine Formation in Lebanon, potentially Santonian of Sahel Alma, Lebanon.
- Boreopeltis ifrimae (Fuchs, 2021) from the Turonian-aged Agua Nueva Formation of Vallecillo, Mexico, has a gladius length of 47 centimeters and is the second-largest known plesioteuthidid after Eromangateuthis soniae.

=== Formerly assigned species ===
- Eromangateuthis soniae Fuchs 2019 (previously Boreopeltis soniae Wade, 1993)
