= John Codner =

English painter

John Whitlock Codner (June 1913 – August 2008) was a British painter and wartime camouflage officer. He exhibited at the Royal Academy and his works remain in major collections to this day.

== Biography ==
=== Early life ===
John Codner was born in Beaconsfield in 1913. He was the son of the society painter Maurice Codner, whose friend Sir Alfred Munnings encouraged John Codner to paint. He was educated at St. Edward's School, Oxford.

=== War service ===
Having entered the Second World War serving in the Royal Artillery, Codner was commissioned into the Royal Engineers in 1940 and served as a camouflage officer in the Middle East. He sailed to Egypt on the RMS Samaria, in a contingent of artists turned camoufleurs that included: Steven Sykes (a stained glass artist) Edward Bainbridge Copnall (a sculptor), Jasper Maskelyne (a stage magician) and Peter Proud (a film art director). This group, serving under the Director of Camouflage, Geoffrey Barkas, GHQ.ME G(Cam), became renowned for the techniques they employed as part of the war of deception. Codner worked on camouflage and deception with Peter Proud during the Siege of Tobruk, 1941, and under Steven Sykes on Operation Crusader.

=== Artist ===
After the war Codner studied in London, at the Regent Street Polytechnic School of Art. He then taught at the Sir John Cass School of Art, from 1947 to 1951. Following a move to the West Country, he became a member of the Royal West of England Academy (RWA). He worked from his studio in Stokenham in Devon and was an honorary member of the Bristol Savages.

He was best known as a figure painter, but also produced still life and landscape paintings. He exhibited his paintings at the Royal Academy and the RWA.

== Bibliography ==
- Barkas, Geoffrey; Barkas, Natalie (1952). The Camouflage Story (from Aintree to Alamein). Cassell.
- Stroud, Rick (2012). The Phantom Army of Alamein: How the Camouflage Unit and Operation Bertram Hoodwinked Rommel. Bloomsbury.
