= Brian Robb =

English painter

- Born: 7 May 1913; Scarborough, North Yorkshire, England
- Died: 1979 (aged 65–66)
- Education: Chelsea School of Art; Slade School of Fine Art
- Known for: Illustrator, cartoonist; wartime camoufleur
- Spouse: Barbara Robb

Brian Robb (7 May 1913 – 1979) was a painter, illustrator, and cartoonist. He worked for Shell and London Transport, designing posters and advertisements, and as a cartoonist for Punch. During World War II, he served as a camouflage officer in the Western Desert. He taught at Chelsea College of Art before and after the war, before becoming head of illustration at the Royal College of Art.

== Biography ==
=== Early life ===
Robb was educated at Malvern College. He studied at Chelsea School of Art from 1930, and at the Slade School of Fine Art from 1935.

During the 1930s he became known for his humorous cartoons published in Punch. He was a skilled illustrator, creating both pen-and-ink and watercolour illustrations for books such as The Adventures of Odd and Elsewhere. He was in demand for his ability to design posters for London Transport and advertisements for Shell, where he had worked for Jack Beddington.

In 1937 he married Barbara Anne, founder of the pressure group Aid for the Elderly in Government Institutions (AEGIS) and NHS policy campaigner.

After finishing his education at the Slade, he returned to Chelsea School of Art as a lecturer.

=== Wartime camoufleur ===
The head of the Middle East Command Camouflage Directorate, Geoffrey Barkas, always short of skilled camouflage officers, heard that there was an artist working as a private soldier in the Sinai desert. He found Robb sitting, utterly bored, beside a searchlight with nothing to do. Barkas promptly had Robb posted to his department at General Headquarters (GHQ) in Cairo. Once there, he was duly commissioned and trained to be a Camouflage Officer. Remarkably, the lassitude quickly vanished: he was soon doing all duties with energy, good humour and enthusiasm.

Robb's ability was put to use in Operation Bertram, the large-scale camouflage and deception operation for the battle of El Alamein. Barkas put Tony Ayrton and Robb in charge of the task of camouflaging Eighth Army's preparations and movements on the genuine attack path in the north, near the coast road, while creating a complete dummy armoured division in the south, near El Munassib in the desert. The dummy stores dump in the south was codenamed "Brian" after Robb. The dump contained 700 false piles of stores, simulating everything from ammunition and petrol to food and engineering tools.

=== Artist and teacher ===
After the war, Robb returned to his lecturing job at the Chelsea School of Art, where he inspired a generation of artists such as the illustrator Quentin Blake. In 1963, he moved to become head of illustration at the Royal College of Art, taking over from Edward Ardizzone. He retired in 1978.

== Legacy ==
Quentin Blake wrote that "Robb's work had a humane, wry, almost teasing character that makes me wish he had set his hand to more children's books than he did. Brian Robb established illustration as a separate strand in the educational life of the college [Chelsea]."

== Works ==
Books illustrated by Robb

- Aesop (trans. S.A. Handford) (1954). Aesop's Fables. Penguin.
- Andreyev, Leonid Nikolaevich (trans. Walter Morison) (1947). Judas Iscariot and Other Stories. John Westhouse.
- Anon (1968-9). The Oxford Illustrated Old Testament. Oxford University Press. (in part)
- Apuleius (trans. William Adlington) (1947). The Golden Asse of Lucius Apuleius. John Westhouse.
- Barkas, Geoffrey (1952). The Camouflage Story. From Aintree to Alamein. Cassell.
- Day, Charles William (1946). Hints on Etiquette and the Usages of Society. Turnstile Press.
- De Quincey, A. (1947). The Last of the Dragons. Hamish Hamilton.
- Douglas, Alfred (1979). Tails With a Twist: Animal Nonsense Verse. Batsford.
- Fielding, Henry(1953). Tom Jones. Macdonald.
- Nesbit, Edith (1977). Fairy Stories. Ernest Benn.
- Raspe, Rudolph Eric (1947). 12 Adventures of the Celebrated Baron Munchausen. Peter Lunn.
- Robb, Brian My Grandmother's Djinn. Deutsch. (1976).
- Robb, Brian (1944). My Middle East Campaigns. Collins.
- Robb, Brian (1979). The Last of the Centaurs. Deutsch.
- Roose-Evans, James (1974). Elsewhere & the Clowns. Deutsch.
- Roose-Evans, James (1973). Odd and the Great Bear. Deutsch.
- Roose-Evans, James (1975). Odd to the Rescue!. Deutsch.
- Roose-Evans, James (1971). The Adventures of Odd and Elsewhere. Deutsch.
- Roose-Evans, James (1977). The Lost Treasure of Wales. Deutsch.
- Roose-Evans, James (1975). The Return of the Great Bear. Deutsch.
- Roose-Evans, James (1975). The Secret of Tippity Witchit. Deutsch.
- Roose-Evans, James (1972). The Secret of the Seven Bright Shiners. Deutsch.
- Sterne, Laurence (1948). A Sentimental Journey Through France and Italy. Macdonald.
- Sterne, Laurence (1949). The Life and Opinions of Tristram Shandy, Gentleman. Macdonald.
- de Quincey, T. (1948). My Kingdom for a Cow!. Hamish Hamilton.

Paintings

- Gondolas, Venice

== Bibliography ==
Camouflage

- Barkas, Geoffrey; Barkas, Natalie (1952). The Camouflage Story (from Aintree to Alamein). Cassell.
- Crowdy, Terry (2008). Deceiving Hitler: Double Cross and Deception in World War II. Osprey.
- Rankin, Nicholas (2008). Churchill's Wizards: The British Genius for Deception 1914-1945. Faber.
- Stroud, Rick (2012). The Phantom Army of Alamein: How the Camouflage Unit and Operation Bertram Hoodwinked Rommel. Bloomsbury.

Art

- Horne, Alan (1994). Dictionary of 20th Century British Book Illustrators. British Antique Collectors' Club.
