= Middle East Command Camouflage Directorate =

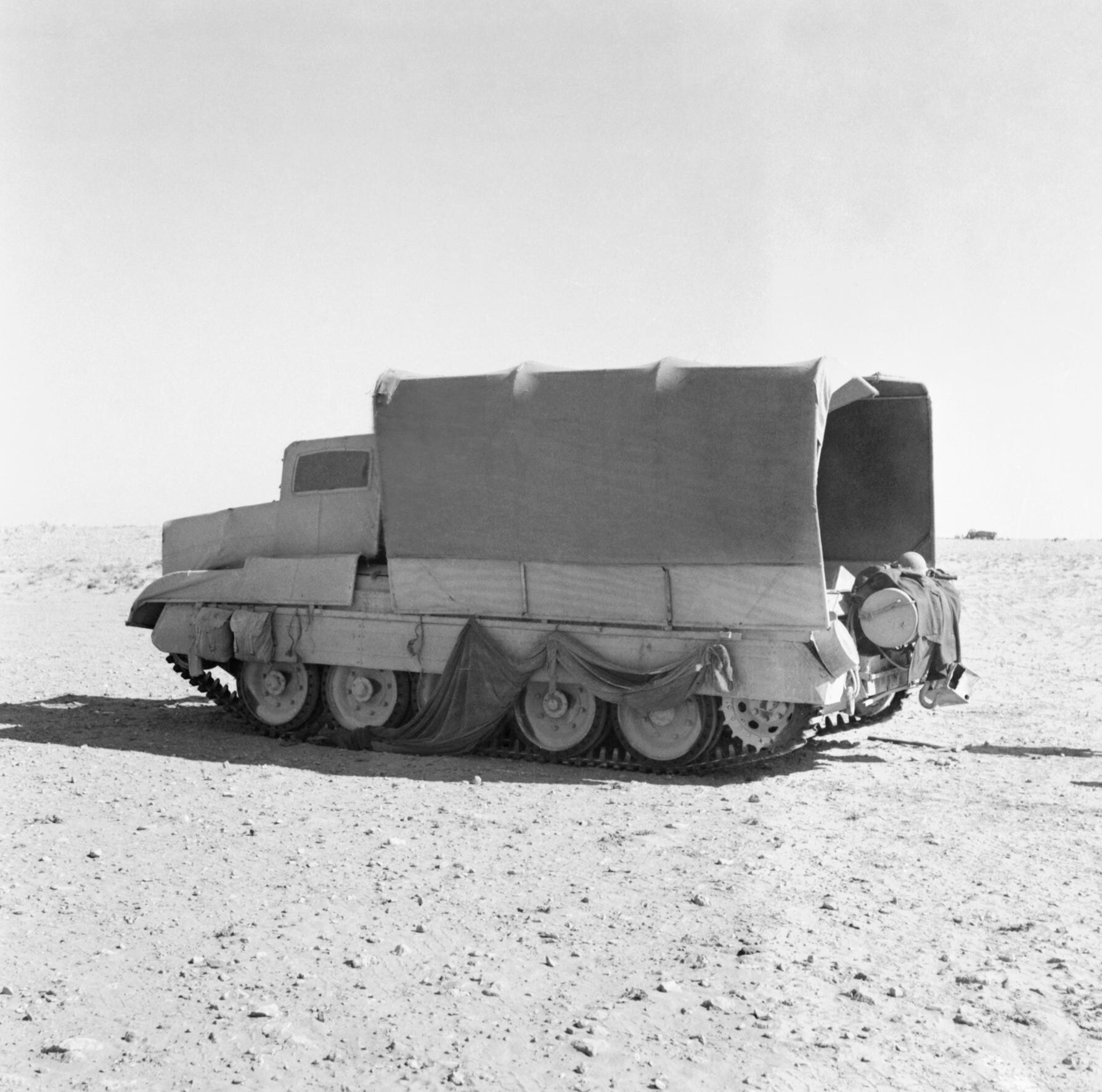
- A Crusader tank in Operation Bertram masquerading as a truck in its 'Sunshield'
- Active: 1941–1943
- Country: United Kingdom
- Branch: Royal Engineers
- Role: Military camouflage training & operations
- Garrison/HQ: Helwan, Egypt
- Nickname: Camouflage
- Engagements: Siege of Tobruk; El Alamein

Commanders
- Notable commanders: Geoffrey Barkas

The British Middle East Command Camouflage Directorate (also known as the Camouflage Unit or Camouflage Branch) organised major deception operations for Middle East Command in the Western Desert Campaign of the Second World War. It provided camouflage during the siege of Tobruk; a dummy railhead at Misheifa, and the largest of all, Operation Bertram, the army-scale deception for the decisive battle of El Alamein in October 1942. The successful deception was praised publicly by Winston Churchill.

These operations contributed to victory by diverting enemy attention from real targets to dummy ones, wasting enemy ammunition, preserving vital resources such as the single water desalination plant at Tobruk, and deceiving the enemy as to allied strength and intentions. Operation Bertram may have been the last army-scale physical deception ever to take place, since subsequent major deceptions, including those for the D-Day landings in Normandy, have included or consisted of electronic measures.

The unit was led by the film director Geoffrey Barkas, with a team of professional artists recruited as camouflage officers or "camoufleurs". The team included the artist Steven Sykes, the first Camouflage GSO2 in the British army.

== Recruitment of a leader ==
The unit's leader, Geoffrey Barkas (1896–1979) served in the 1915 Gallipoli campaign and then in the later part of the Battle of the Somme in France, where he won a Military Cross. Between the wars, Barkas was a filmmaker, working as a writer, producer, and director. In 1937, Barkas joined Shell-Mex/BP under its publicity director Jack Beddington, who guided Barkas into military camouflage. In May 1940, he was rapidly drafted into the Royal Engineers by Beddington's brother Freddie, with a summary 10-day basic training course, followed by a camouflage course. He developed his thinking in Northern Ireland in 1940, teaching, running demonstrations, and writing an instructional pamphlet.

== Foundation ==
=== Origins ===
At the end of 1940, Barkas and his camoufleurs were sent to Egypt, where he arrived on the British troopship Andes on 1 January 1941. He arranged a flight to observe the desert from the air, noting patterns that he named as "Wadi", "Polka Dot" and so on that he hoped to use for camouflage. To get his fledgling unit recognised, he printed an unusually elegant booklet called "Concealment in the Field" in Cairo, the idea being to produce something clear, readable, and above all obviously different from the mass of army manuals. He was surprised to have this at once recognised as a formal operational requirement by the British Army's Middle East Command, that is, as an essential item for every army unit. Barkas was promoted to Director of Camouflage with the rank of lieutenant colonel. On 19 September 1941, Steven Sykes became the first Camouflage GSO2 in Eighth Army and indeed in the whole of the British Army, and was promoted to Major. From the start of 1942, Peter Proud was the staff officer (GSO2) responsible for training and development.

=== Camouflage Training & Development Centre, Middle East ===
The Camouflage Development & Training Centre (CDTC.ME) was set up at Helwan (Camp E) in November 1941, as the theatre counterpart of the original CDTC established at Farnham Castle. The Commandant was a regular officer, Major John Sholto Douglas, from the well-known Scottish family, with the British zoologist Hugh Cott, by now a captain, as chief instructor. Regular liaison with Proud kept the staff abreast of the responses from their colleagues on the front-line, out in the Western Desert, as well as any developments from Home, with training adjusted to reflect the latest changes. The centre had a development wing, commanded by a captain from the Royal West African Frontier Force, A. E. Upfold, with a workshop and an experimental section. These produced "a stream of new ideas for dummy vehicles, tanks, aircraft and all the other portents of impending battle". Every new device was carefully tested by observation from the air, through collaboration with the Royal Air Force.

== Deception operations ==
=== Dummy railhead for Operation Crusader ===
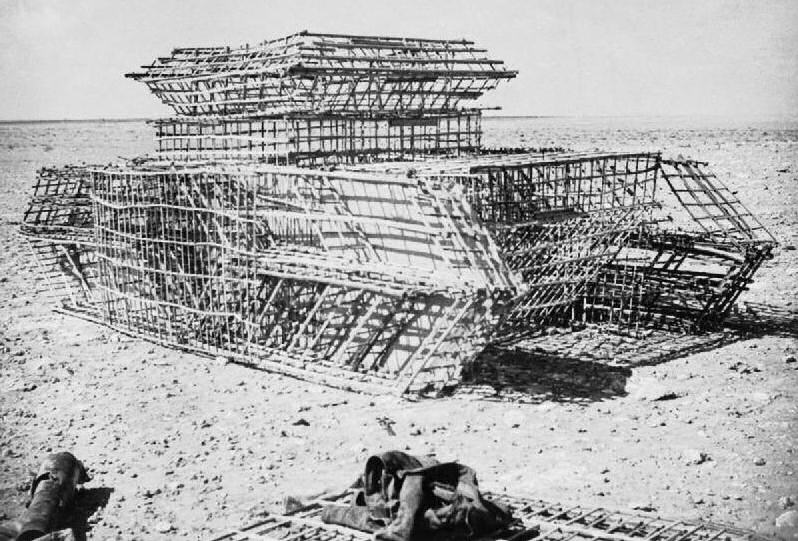
Dummy tank of the type used by Sykes and his team at depot 2. The structure was made of gerida hurdling, and then covered (not shown) with canvas. A garnished camouflage net was added as a finishing touch.

One of Camouflage's first major deceptions was the dummy railhead at depot 2. Barkas assigned the artist Steven Sykes to build a convincing dummy to divert enemy attention from the real railhead at Misheifa bringing materiel for Operation Crusader. This complex deception involved 6 miles (9.7 km) of dummy railway, a dummy train, dummy sidings, and a selection of dummy tanks, all made of gerida palm hurdles and other simple materials, to look as if they had been delivered by the railway. More than 100 bombs were dropped on depot 2, at least halving the attacks on the real thing at Misheifa, giving the lie to the jokes about wooden bombs being dropped on wooden railways by an undeceived enemy. Barkas noted that "camouflage men must be among the few otherwise sane beings who yearn to be bombed." The pioneering effort's success was achieved in a few weeks, amidst severe shortages of men and raw materials. The writer Julian Trevelyan recorded that

The dummy railhead looks very spectacular in the evening light. No living man is there; but dummy men are grubbing in dummy swill-troughs, and dummy lorries are unloading dummy tanks, while a dummy engine puffs dummy smoke into the eyes of the enemy.

— Julian Trevelyan

=== Camouflage and deception in the siege of Tobruk ===
During the Eighth Army's retreat across Libya in 1941, the camouflage officer and former film art director Peter Proud and the camouflage sergeant William Murray Dixon found themselves trapped in the port city of Tobruk. Proud quickly set up a camouflage unit, acquiring a section of Australian engineers, a section of Royal Army Service Corps, and a company of Indian Pioneers (military labourers). Materials of all kinds were in short supply in the siege. Proud improvised, using scrap wood, salvaged textiles to make camouflage nets, and even foodstuffs—camouflage paint was made by mixing rancid flour with spoiled Worcester sauce, described by Barkas as "a revolting but highly adhesive paste". Proud attracted the notice of army drivers by offering to camouflage their vehicles while they waited, with a sign advertising the "Camouflage Service Station". The reason for the surprising offer was in itself a deception, requiring numerous vehicle tracks in an area away from actual targets to give enemy tactical reconnaissance planes the impression that dummy facilities, also built by Proud, were being visited intensively. Proud ran other camouflage schemes to protect three critical resources in besieged Tobruk: the harbour; the small Royal Air Force landing ground, with just three Hurricane fighters; and the town's water desalination plant, the town's main supply of drinking water.

Tobruk's harbour had been heavily bombed by the Luftwaffe (the German air force), and several wrecked ships made approach difficult. Proud and Murray Dixon built dummy jetties and dummy wrecked barges, under which small but vitally important gunboats and transports could be hidden. The Royal Navy thanked Proud after the siege "for his most efficient assistance".

For the Royal Air Force, Proud had caves dug into the sides of a wadi to hide two of the Hurricanes. The third was hidden in a hole beside the runway, the same shape as the aircraft, and covered by a lid and some tents. Dummy aircraft and hangars were constructed to draw fire; these were marked as real on marked-up air photographs captured with a Luftwaffe airman. The aircraft all survived the siege, important both for air defence and for maintaining the morale of the defending troops.

The desalination plant was impossible to hide, and since it had been built by the Italians, the enemy knew exactly where and what it was. Proud and Murray Dixon therefore disguised the plant to look as if it had been destroyed by a bomb. A trompe-l'œil black hole was painted over the top and one side of the building, along with shrapnel marks, shortly after a real attack which missed the plant; a disused chimney was demolished; real rubble, empty oil drums and real wrecked vehicles, which were in plentiful supply, were brought to decorate the compound; and some fake craters were constructed and decorated as if a stick of bombs had fallen right on target. The finishing touch was some real smoke from burning oily rags. The plant was not attacked again.

=== Deception for El Alamein ===
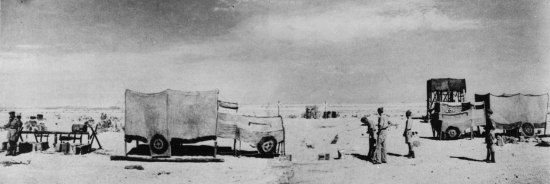
Geoffrey Barkas's biggest 'film production': Operation Bertram, the deception for the battle of El Alamein, October 1942

Barkas' camouflage unit helped Montgomery to victory at El Alamein through a large scale deception codenamed Operation Bertram, which ran from August 1942 until the actual battle in October. Among other things, 600 tanks were disguised as supply lorries in the northern sector, while dummy tanks, supplies and a complete dummy water pipeline were deployed in the south. The deception succeeded, leading Rommel's staff to believe the allied attack would be in the south, and to deploy substantial forces there. Barkas made the painter Tony Ayrton his deputy for Bertram. Ayrton worked tirelessly to put in place all the complex schemes, and to repair them when they were hit by a dust storm. Barkas described Operation Bertram as

the task of providing props for the biggest 'film production' on which I ever expect to be engaged

— Geoffrey Barkas

Winston Churchill, announcing victory at El Alamein in the House of Commons in London on 11 November 1942, praised the success of Operation Bertram, and implicitly the work of the Camouflage Directorate, as follows:

By a marvellous system of camouflage, complete tactical surprise was achieved in the desert. The Xth Corps, which he had seen from the air exercising fifty miles in the rear, moved silently away in the night, but leaving an exact simulacrum of its tanks where it had been, and proceeded to its points of attack.

— Winston Churchill, 1942

== Techniques and inventions ==
A wide range of camouflage and deception techniques and devices were invented or developed by the unit.

Techniques and devices
Technique	Device	Construction	Usage	Inventor
Masquerade (tank as truck)	"Sunshield"	hinged canopy	Operation Bertram	Archibald Wavell
Masquerade (gun as truck)	"Cannibal"	canopy with guys	Operation Bertram	The camouflage unit
Masquerade (stores as truck, tent)	net-covered stack	real stores, canvas, nets	Operation Bertram	Geoffrey Barkas, Tony Ayrton, Brian Robb
Masquerade, simulation	False bomb damage, with smoke	Trompe-l'œil painting, burning oily rags	Siege of Tobruk desalination plant	Peter Proud
Display	"Net Gun Pit"	netting/canvas with poles	Operation Sentinel	Peter Proud
Display	False armoured division	Tank dummies, wrecks, etc.	Operation Bertram	John Baker
Display	Dummy railhead	wooden poles, petrol tins, canvas, wrecks	Operation Crusader	Steven Sykes
Display	Dummy port	wood, canvas, paint, rafts	Operation Crusader	Steven Sykes
Display	Dummy pipeline	petrol tins, canvas, scavenged materials	Operation Bertram	Geoffrey Barkas, Tony Ayrton

== Key people ==
The camouflage directorate consisted mostly of officers recruited from people who were artists in civilian life, many of whom were already well known. Hugh Cott was an exception, being an expert in animal camouflage with his then recently published textbook, Adaptive Coloration in Animals (1940), a book that had the distinction of being popularly carried for practical advice by army officers.

Middle East Directorate of Camouflage
Name	Peacetime role	Role	Activities
Barkas, Geoffrey	Filmmaker	Director of Camouflage	Create unit, found cam. school, recruit officers
Sykes, Steven	Stained glass artist, potter	Second in command, first GSO2 camouflage officer	Dummy railhead; Operation Crusader camouflage
Ayrton, Tony	Painter	Second in command, replacing Sykes	Operation Bertram
Robb, Brian	Painter, illustrator, poster artist, Punch cartoonist	Camouflage officer	Operation Bertram
Proud, Peter	Film art director	Camouflage officer, GSO2	Siege of Tobruk camouflage and deception; "Net Gun Pit"
Dixon, William Murray	Sergeant, 2 Armoured Division	Camouflage officer	Siege of Tobruk camouflage and deception
Cott, Hugh B.	Zoologist	Chief Instructor, School of Camouflage	Training courses
Douglas, John Sholto	Major, Royal Scots Guards	Commandant, School of Camouflage	Professional soldier, running the school
Galligan, Edwin C.	Commercial artist	Camouflage officer	Siege of Tobruk
Maskelyne, Jasper	Stage magician	Head of "Camouflage Experimental Unit"	"Sunshield" prototypes
Copnall, Edward Bainbridge	Sculptor	Camouflage officer	Operation Crusader
Medley, Robert	Painter	Camouflage officer	Operation Crusader
Codner, John	Painter	Camouflage officer	Operation Crusader
Pusey, Fred	Film art director	Camouflage officer	Operation Crusader
Baker, John H.	Architect	Camouflage officer	Operation Crusader

== The end of physical deception ==
Camouflage's Operation Bertram may have been the last army-scale physical deception, argues the writer and film director Rick Stroud, since all subsequent major deceptions, including those of Operation Bodyguard to protect the Operation Overlord "D-Day" landings in Normandy, have consisted mainly of electronic measures, though with physical touches, like the work done by architect and camoufleur Basil Spence to create a dummy oil storage facility for ships at Dover. Since then, the advent of reconnaissance satellites and continuous electronic monitoring have made army-scale deception ever more difficult.

== Sources ==
- Barkas, Geoffrey; Barkas, Natalie (1952). The Camouflage Story (from Aintree to Alamein). Cassell. No ISBN.
- Crowdy, Terry (2008). Deceiving Hitler: Double Cross and Deception in World War II. Osprey. ISBN 978-1-78200-331-1.
- Fisher, David (2005). The War Magician: The True Story of Jasper Maskelyne. Phoenix. ISBN 978-0-425-06295-1.
- Forbes, Peter (2009). Dazzled and Deceived: Mimicry and Camouflage. Yale. pp. 155–156. ISBN 978-0-300-12539-9.
- Forsyth, Isla (2017). Second World War British Military Camouflage: Designing Deception. Bloomsbury. ISBN 978-1-4742-2260-0.
- Lucas, James Sydney (1983). War in the Desert: The Eighth Army at El Alamein. Beaufort Books. ISBN 978-0-85368-549-4.
- Rankin, Nicholas (2008). Churchill's Wizards: The British Genius for Deception 1914–1945. Faber. ISBN 978-0-571-22196-7.
- Richardson, Charles (1985). Flashback: A Soldier's Story. Kimber. ISBN 978-0-7183-0567-3.
- Stroud, Rick (2012). The Phantom Army of Alamein: How the Camouflage Unit and Operation Bertram Hoodwinked Rommel. Bloomsbury. ISBN 978-1-4088-2910-3.
- Sykes, Steven (1990). Deceivers Ever: The Memoirs of a Camouflage Officer. Spellmount. ISBN 978-0-946771-54-7.
