= Peter Proud =

British film art director (1913–1989)

Peter Proud (born Ralph Priestman Proud, 6 May 1913, Glasgow – March 1989, London) was a British film art director. He made a major contribution to wartime camouflage and deception operations in the Western Desert, especially in the siege of Tobruk.

== Early career ==
In 1928, Proud left school at age 15 and started work at the Elstree film studios on Alfred Hitchcock films including Murder! (1930) and Rich and Strange. In 1932, he joined Gaumont British as assistant designer to Alfred Junge. The British Film Institute's Raymond Durgnat described him as an "ace production designer".

In 1935, he moved to Gainsborough Pictures, and in 1936, he became an art director at Warner Bros., where he worked on Michael Powell's film Something Always Happens.

== Wartime camouflage ==
The dummy 'Net Gun Pit' deceived enemy tactical reconnaissance in the Western Desert campaign of 1941–1942

Proud worked as a camouflage officer under Geoffrey Barkas in the Western Desert in the Second World War, and was responsible for effective camouflage and deception in the Siege of Tobruk. With Steven Sykes, he created the dummy port at Ras al Hilal to divert enemy attention from the Eighth Army's vital supply ports. He was a creative camoufleur, inventing the "Net Gun Pit", a quickly-erected structure of netting and canvas, that from the air closely resembled an anti-aircraft gun in a sandbagged pit.

== Post-war ==
After the war, Proud ran his own production company. He worked on the TV series The Buccaneers and The Adventures of Robin Hood at Nettlefold Studios.

== Selected filmography ==
Proud worked, mainly as art director, on films including:

- Murder! (1930)
- Orders is Orders (1933)
- My Old Dutch (1934)
- Waltzes from Vienna (1934)
- Something Always Happens (1934)
- The Man Who Knew Too Much (Alfred Hitchcock, 1934)
- Man of the Moment (1935)
- The Black Mask (1935)
- It's in the Bag (1936)
- Educated Evans (1936)
- Don't Get Me Wrong (1937)
- Everything Happens to Me (1938)
- They Drive by Night (1938)
- The Return of Carol Deane (1938)
- Many Tanks Mr. Atkins (1938)
- Green for Danger (1946)
- The Woman in the Hall (1947)
- For Them That Trespass (1949)
- Nowhere to Go (1958)
- Desert Mice (1959)
- The League of Gentlemen (1960)
- The Guilty Party (1962)
- It's All Over Town (1963)
- Saturday Night Out (1964)
- Fanatic (1965)
- Theatre of Death (1966)
- The Naked Runner (1967)

== Bibliography ==
- Barkas, Geoffrey; Barkas, Natalie (1952). The Camouflage Story (from Aintree to Alamein). Cassell.
- Stroud, Rick (2012). The Phantom Army of Alamein: How the Camouflage Unit and Operation Bertram Hoodwinked Rommel. Bloomsbury.
