= Albert Barkas =

British Librarian and local historian

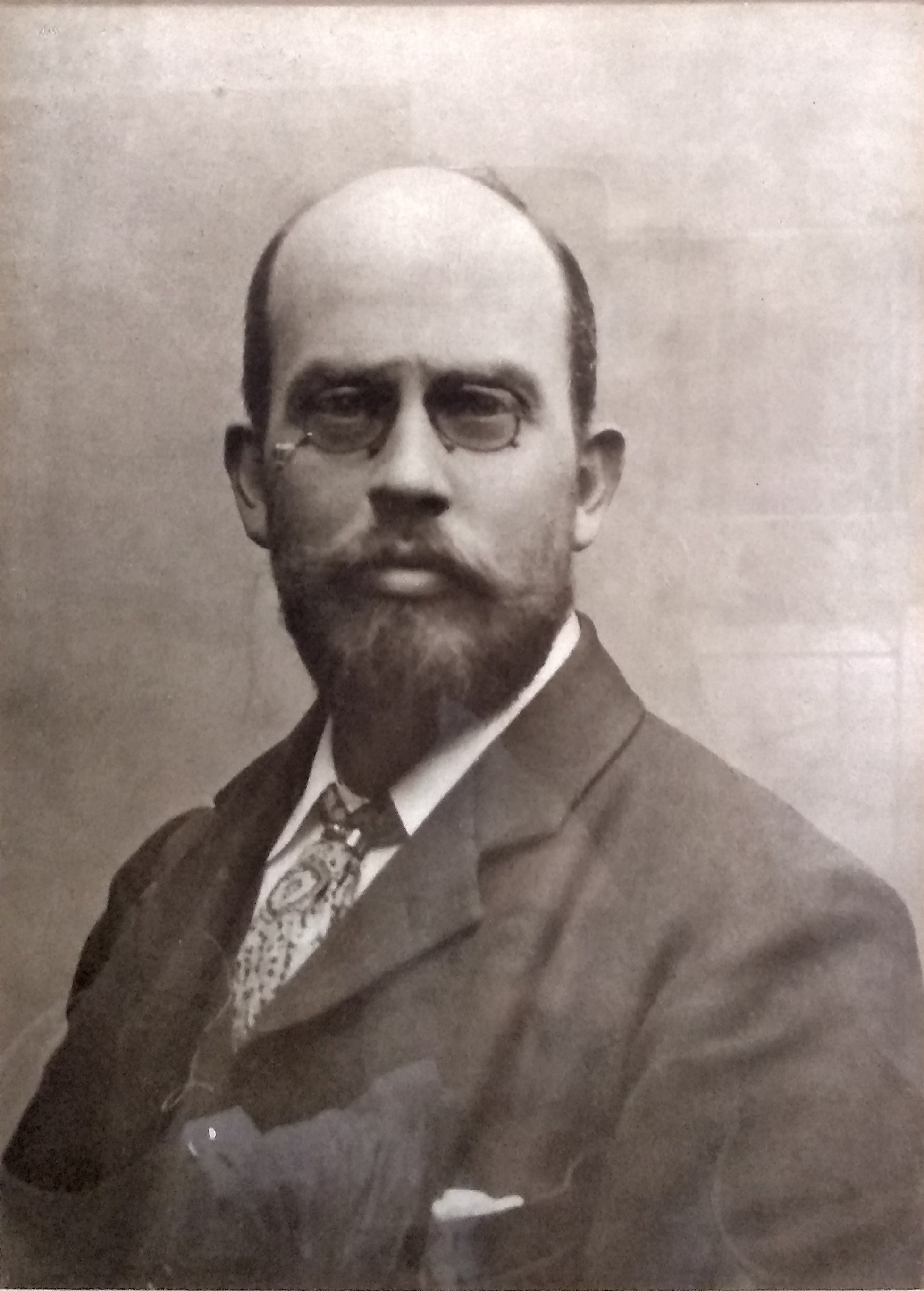
Albert Barkas

Albert Atkin Barkas (21 August 1861 – 15 May 1921) was a librarian in the Municipal Borough of Richmond (Surrey) for 30 years who established what is now the London Borough of Richmond upon Thames' Local Studies Collection.

== Early life ==
He was born on 21 August 1861 in St Helier, Jersey, Channel Islands.

== Career ==
Barkas worked in Brighton as a bookseller and in 1881 he was appointed assistant librarian at the Birmingham Free Library. He married in 1888 and in 1891 the family moved to Richmond from Bordesley, Birmingham, when he was appointed librarian in the Municipal Borough of Richmond at a salary of £120pa. The family lived rent-free over the library on Little Green. This accommodation was cramped and his youngest daughter, Jacqueline, died in 1905 aged only 4 years after falling down the stairs. From 1911 the family lived at The Cottage, next to the library, on Little Green, Richmond.

In 1893 he established Richmond's Local History Collection. He obtained the fine photographic survey of the town taken c.1900.

== Personal life ==
In 1888 he married, in Birmingham, Anna Julia De Gruchy (1863–1911), who was also from Jersey. They had two daughters and two sons. His wife died in 1911.

His youngest son, Geoffrey de Gruchy Barkas, who was awarded the Military Cross in 1916 aged 20, became a filmmaker between the two world wars and led the British Middle East Command Camouflage Directorate in the Second World War.

== Death and legacy ==
Barkas committed suicide in 1921. He was found in Richmond Park with a bullet wound to his head and died two days later on 15 May without regaining consciousness. The funeral service took place at the Presbyterian Church and he was buried in Richmond Cemetery.

The Albert Barkas Room for Local Studies at the Old Town Hall is named in his memory.
