= Tony Ayrton =

English artist (1909–1943)

Antony Maxwell Ayrton
- In the western desert, c. 1941
- Born: 1909; Hampstead, England
- Died: 4 April 1943 (aged 33–34); Egypt
- Occupations: Artist, military engineer

Antony Maxwell Ayrton (1909 – 4 April 1943) known as Tony Ayrton, was an artist and camouflage officer. He is best known for his work on the large-scale deception for the decisive second battle of El Alamein, Operation Bertram.

From the Camouflage staff I was given a most devoted and effective sapper, Major Ayrton, who became my assistant and worked miracles.
--- Colonel Charles Richardson, deception planner for El Alamein

== Early life ==
Ayrton was born in 1909 into a creative family of some merit. His father, perhaps the most conventional, was the architect Maxwell Ayrton; one uncle was the actor Randle Ayrton, while another was the artist William Ayrton. Tony himself became an artist.

The Ayrton family originated in Yorkshire, though Tony descended from a branch long-resident in Cheshire. His forebear Edward Ayrton was mayor of Ripon in 1760, and laid the foundations for the family's subsequent prominence.

== War service ==
Ayrton was gazetted an officer in the Royal Engineers, on 3 December 1939. He was responsible for forming No. 85 South African Camouflage Company, and in early 1941 he was one of only five fully trained camouflage officers in the whole of the British middle east. The Director of Camouflage for Middle East Command, Geoffrey Barkas, quickly had him seconded to his team, followed by the whole of No. 85 Camouflage Company. On 17 July 1942, Barkas made Ayrton his deputy, replacing the brilliant camoufleur Steven Sykes, who was exhausted and ill. Still short of camouflage officers, Barkas heard of a private soldier, Brian Robb, who was known to be skilful at drawing, and finding him enthusiastic and likeable, quickly brought him to General Headquarters in Cairo and had him promoted to Staff Lieutenant.

== Deception for El Alamein ==
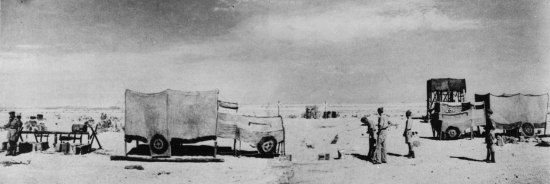
Among his other camouflage and deception tasks in Operation Bertram, Ayrton built the "Diamond" dummy water pipeline for El Alamein, October 1942.

Charles Richardson was tasked by Freddie de Guingand, Bernard Montgomery's chief of staff, to plan the deception operation for El Alamein, named Operation Bertram. Richardson was happy to be able to rely on the "highly developed" system of camouflage and deception which Barkas had created. Richardson was a member of the Royal Engineers and had worked on deception operations in Dudley Clarke's secret 'A' Force. On 17 September 1941, Barkas and Ayrton were called to Eighth Army headquarters, out in the desert near Borg el Arab, between Alexandria and El Alamein. They listened in astonishment as Richardson explained the size of the deception that he was planning. He wanted Rommel to believe that Montgomery would attack in the south, not along the obvious coast road route; and that the attack would not be ready on the night of the full moon, 23 October. This was to be achieved despite the lack of cover in the desert, and the 700 tanks and 400 guns that were to be used in the attack.

On 27 September 1942, 28 days before the planned start of battle, Barkas instructed Ayrton and Robb to organise the camouflage and dummies representing the whole of Eighth Army's armoured force and artillery.

Ayrton planned and supervised the building of the "Diamond" dummy pipeline, which ran southwards to help give Rommel the impression that an Armoured Corps was massing in the south. Ayrton convinced Richardson that Camouflage could implement this despite the shortage of time and materials. Ayrton's plan was to flatten and join thousands of the non-returnable 4-gallon petrol cans to make 5 miles of dummy pipe, which was laid in a trench and left for one day. The next night, the trench was filled in, and the pipe laid in a trench 5 miles further south. The trench remained about 10 miles short of its destination - the southern part of the British front line - on 23 September, showing Rommel that the pipeline and the attack were not ready. To give the pipeline realism, Ayrton planned dummy overhead storage tanks, pumphouses, and filling stations complete with dummy men and trucks. This activity was reinforced by a large dummy dump named Brian for Ayrton's cheerful assistant, Brian Robb.

All went well, until one night a powerful desert dust storm tore many of the dummy trucks to pieces. Ayrton worked all that night and the next day to restore the "scene" to a semblance of reality. Richardson noted with relief that "German Tac[tical] R[econnaissance] noticed nothing new. Every morning I received the intercepted Luftwaffe's report of the previous day. 'Nothing to report' was the phlegmatic message on about D-7." Unknown to Ayrton or Richardson, Ultra showed that the Royal Air Force had ensured that no German aircraft flew over the Eighth Army preparations between 18 and 23 October.

As well as working on the dummy army in the south, Ayrton led the work to hide the real army in the north, devising the methods used to hide the army's fuel, food, and ammunition. The petrol, held in fragile and leaky 4-gallon cans, was stacked in existing slit trenches. These were revetted with masonry, casting sharp shadows. A single wall of petrol cans against the real wall was undetectable from the air. With the real stores invisible in the north, and the dummy stores very visible in the south, Ayrton had made Eighth Army seem to be far to the south of where it actually was.

By 22 October 1942, the whole of Eighth Army's armour was assembled in its "Martello" concentration area, the enemy having suspected nothing. Barkas wrote that "all the other schemes mounted by Ayrton, Robb, and the other Eighth Army camouflage men were also ready. The job was done."

The attack in the north at El Alamein on the night of 23 October 1942 came, as Winston Churchill reported to parliament, as a "complete tactical surprise". Richardson wrote "Thanks to the unfailing support of the corps commanders, the discipline of every unit in the Army, the devoted work of Ayrton and Robb, and of many other camouflage specialists, and the magnificent performance of the Desert Air Force's fighter pilots, the deception plan succeeded."

== Death ==
Ayrton died on active service, on 4 April 1943, of meningitis. He is buried in Tunisia, in the Medjez-el-Bab Commonwealth War Cemetery.

For his war-service, Major Ayrton was posthumously awarded a Mention in Despatches.

== Bibliography ==
- Barkas, Geoffrey; Barkas, Natalie (1952). The Camouflage Story (from Aintree to Alamein). Cassell.
- Crowdy, Terry (2008). Deceiving Hitler: Double-Cross and Deception in World War II. Osprey.
- Forbes, Peter (2009). Dazzled and Deceived: Mimicry and Camouflage. Yale. pp. 155–156.
- Richardson, Charles (1985). Flashback: A Soldier's Story. Kimber.
- Stroud, Rick (2012). The Phantom Army of Alamein: How the Camouflage Unit and Operation Bertram Hoodwinked Rommel. Bloomsbury.
- Sykes, Steven (1991). Deceivers Ever: Memoirs of a Camouflage Officer. Spellmount.
