= Nanoscience: Giants of the Infinitesimal =

2014 non-fiction book

- Author: Peter Forbes, Tom Grimsey
- Subject: Nanoscience
- Genre: Popular science
- Publisher: Papadakis
- Publication date: 2014

Nanoscience: Giants of the Infinitesimal is a 2014 book by Peter Forbes and Tom Grimsey. The book explores the growing fields of nanotechnology and nanoscience, and their history.

== Reception ==
The book was well received by scholars and critics. Andrei Khlobystov praised the book's interdisciplinary scope, writing: "An almost fantastical array of the latest research highlights from leading laboratories around the world is cleverly intertwined with some historical facts and general scientific concepts, all embellished with art and poetry."
