= Fred Pusey =

British art director (1909–1983)

Frederick Leonard Alfred Pusey (4 July 1909 – 12 June 1983) was a British film art director and production designer, and a Second World War camouflage officer. His artistic skill was put to use on large-scale deception schemes in the Western Desert, including a dummy railhead and a dummy port.

== Biography ==
=== Early work ===
Pusey began his career working in an architect's office in 1925. In 1930 he became an art director at British & Dominions Film Corporation.

Pusey was fortunate to be able to work as assistant art director with Vincent Korda's 1936 film Things to Come, which predicted a German invasion of Poland in 1940 and the bombing of a London-like city, as well as Four Feathers and The Drum. He worked as set designer for films including Land Without Music and The Challenge.

=== Wartime camouflage and film ===
Pusey made creative contributions to major camouflage and deception schemes in the Western Desert, collaborating closely with Steven Sykes. He worked on the camouflage for the dummy railhead, a deception for Operation Crusader. He also worked on the dummy port at Ras el Hillal. According to Geoffrey Barkas, Pusey was ideal for the job, as he was "round-faced, amiably beaming, full of ideas and approaching them in a very methodical fashion". He and Sykes worked out and put into practice a plan to make the wrecked port appear serviceable. They used a very large painted canvas, with some skilful scene painting by Pusey, to make a destroyed tunnel appear to have been repaired, and the ruined jetty to be in use. They built dummy oil storage tanks, stores, vehicles, camps and tracks.

Pusey became head of production in the SEAC Film Unit during the war.

=== Postwar TV and film ===
After the war, Pusey travelled up the River Amazon in Brazil for End of the River in 1946.

He worked as production designer on TV series including Callan, Special Branch, and The Rivals of Sherlock Holmes.

== Filmography ==
Pusey worked as art director or production designer between 1932 and 1976 on films and TV programs including:

- Good Night Vienna (1932)
- Up for the Derby (1933)
- Southern Roses (1936)
- The Shape of Things to Come (Vincent Korda, 1936)
- Four Feathers (Vincent Korda)
- The Drum (Vincent Korda)
- Spy in Black (Michael Powell)
- Q-Planes (Michael Powell, 1939)
- Farewell Again (1937)
- The Thief of Bagdad (Alexander Korda & Michael Powell, 1940)
- 49th Parallel (Michael Powell, 1941)
- Once a Jolly Swagman (1948)
- Prelude to Fame (1950)
- Tom Brown's Schooldays (1951)
- The Pickwick Papers (1952)
- Our Girl Friday (1953)

== Bibliography ==
- Barkas, Geoffrey; Barkas, Natalie (1952). The Camouflage Story (from Aintree to Alamein). Cassell.
- Carrick, Edward (1947). Art & Design In The British Film. Archived from the original on 17 May 2012.
- Stroud, Rick (2012). The Phantom Army of Alamein: How the Camouflage Unit and Operation Bertram Hoodwinked Rommel. Bloomsbury.
- Sykes, Steven (1990). Deceivers Ever: The Memoirs of a Camouflage Officer. Tunbridge Wells: Spellmount. ISBN 0-946771-54-5.
