= Peter Forbes (author) =

Peter Forbes is a British science writer and journalist. He was the editor of The Poetry Review from 1986 until 2002. Forbes was Royal Literary Fund Fellow at Queen Mary University of London from 2004 until 2007 and at St George's, University of London from 2010 until 2012. His 2005 book The Gecko's Foot was long-listed for the 2006 Aventis Prize and his 2009 book Dazzled and Deceived won the 2011 Warwick Prize for Writing.

== Early life ==
Forbes was born in Burton on Trent. From 1964-1967, he attended the University of Bristol. At the age of 23, he discovered poetry.

== Career ==
Forbes' journalism began in 1980, writing columns for the New Scientist, Vole, and World Medicine and then moving on to reviews and articles. Prior to deciding on a career in journalism, Forbes studied chemistry in university, a subject he became disenchanted with but which became a subject of several of his books and essays. In 1986, Forbes met Italian author and chemist Primo Levi and told Levi how important it was "that [Levi] had restored some respectability to chemistry", to which Levi "countered that chemistry's critics were also right". The thread of this exchange was picked up in 2001, when Forbes' translation of Levi's The Search for Roots, an anthology of prose and poetry influential in Italian writing, was published.

Forbes has written for many magazines and newspapers including articles and book reviews for The Guardian, Independent, New Humanist, Scientific American, Aeon, Nature and The Los Angeles Review of Books. He has also written three popular science books, The Gecko's Foot, Dazzled and Deceived, Thinking Small and Large, and a science and art book, Nanoscience: Giants of the Infinitesimal, co-authored with the sculptor Tom Grimsey. Georgina Ferry describes The Gecko's Foot "as inviting wonder at the technological sophistication of both natural and human manufacture...", as about "bio-inspiration", the "nanorealm", and that the book's novelty is "its focus on structure". Marek Kohn's review of Dazzled and Deceived notes key themes of the book, including how American artist Abbott Handerson Thayer's study of patterns in nature found later "application in the art of war" through camouflage clothing and "disruptive colour schemes" of ships used in WWI". Andrei Khlobystov's review of Nanoscience reveals that study at small scales is a through-line of Forbes' books and that Forbes' provides the reader with links between "bubbles, zeolites and living cells" among other "seemingly unconnected topics". Margaret Harris' review provides more information about Forbes' subjects: nudibranch symbiosis with algae ("a 'green' energy source"), aerogels, self-assemblying circuits, and other nanodevices. She also cautions the reader that Nanoscience "is not a book for beginners". Rachel Peixoto's review of Thinking Small and Large notes Forbes' emphasis on "sapiocentrism" as a barrier to human understanding of the importance of microbes for avoiding "ecological collapse". She also observes that Forbes contrasts the view of older books such as The Microbe Hunters, which emphasized microbes as vectors of disease, with his view that microbes are useful tiny technologists that can be deployed in the service of humans.

In addition to teaching non-fiction writing at City St George's, University of London, Forbes has given lectures at schools and universities. In 2023 he gave a lecture at the University of Cambridge on the subject of camouflage in science and art.

== Selected works ==
- The Gecko's Foot (2005)
- Dazzled and Deceived (2009)
- Nanoscience: Giants of the Infinitesimal (2014; co-authored with Tom Grimsey)
- Thinking Small and Large: How Microbes Made and Can Save Our World (2025)
