= Operation Bertram =

1942 British deception operation in WWII

- Part of the prelude of the Second Battle of El Alamein
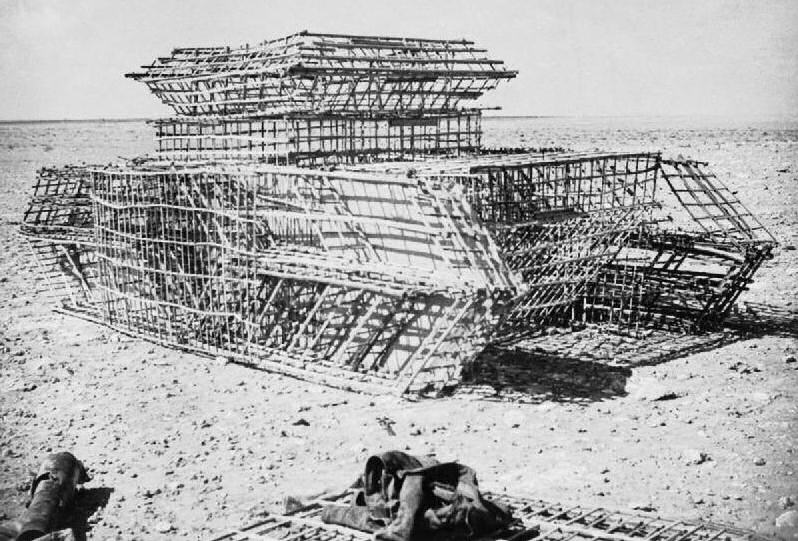
- Constructing a dummy tank at the Camouflage Training & Development Centre at Helwan, near Cairo, photo by Captain Gerald Leet (1942)
- Operational scope: Whole of Eighth Army
- Type: Military deception
- Location: El Alamein, Kingdom of Egypt; 30°50′N 28°57′E
- Planned by: Strategy: Dudley Clarke, Charles Richardson; Tactics: Geoffrey Barkas
- Objective: 1) to conceal preparations for the real attack in north 2) to suggest attack in south 3) to minimise apparent scale of overt preparations in north 4) to suggest attack would not be ready for 2–3 days
- Date: September–October 1942
- Executed by: Middle East Command Camouflage Directorate
- Outcome: Complete tactical surprise
- Location within Egypt

Operation Bertram was a World War II deception operation practised by the Allied forces in Egypt led by Bernard Montgomery, in the months before the Second Battle of El Alamein in 1942. Bertram was devised by Dudley Clarke to deceive Erwin Rommel about the timing and location of the Allied attack. The operation consisted of physical deceptions using dummies and camouflage, designed and made by the British Middle East Command Camouflage Directorate led by Geoffrey Barkas. These were accompanied by electromagnetic deceptions codenamed Operation Canwell, using false radio traffic. All of these were planned to make the Axis believe that the attack would take place to the south, far from the coast road and railway, about two days later than the real attack.

Bertram consisted of the creation of the appearance of army units where none existed and in concealing armour, artillery and matériel. Dummy tanks and guns were made mainly of local materials including calico and palm-frond hurdles. Real tanks were disguised as trucks, using light "Sunshield" canopies. Field guns and their limbers were also disguised as trucks, their real wheels visible, under a simple box-shaped "Cannibal" canopy to give the shape of a truck. Petrol cans were stacked along the sides of existing revetted trenches, hidden in the shadows. Food was stacked in piles of boxes and draped with camouflage nets to resemble trucks.

Trucks were parked openly in the tank assembly area for some weeks. Real tanks were similarly parked openly, far behind the front. Two nights before the attack, the tanks replaced the trucks, being covered with "Sunshields" before dawn. The tanks were replaced that same night with dummies in their original positions, so the armour remained seemingly two or more days' journey behind the front line. To reinforce the impression that the attack was not ready, a dummy water pipeline was constructed, at an apparent rate of 5 mi (8.0 km) per day. Some days' worth remained to be built at the time of the attack; dummy tanks, guns and supplies were constructed to the south.

After the battle, the captured German Panzerarmee general Wilhelm Ritter von Thoma told Montgomery that he had believed the Allies had at least one more armoured division than they did and that the attack would be in the south. Rommel's stand-in, general Georg Stumme, thought the attack would not begin for several weeks. Bertram had succeeded; when announcing the victory at El Alamein in the House of Commons, Winston Churchill praised the camouflage operation.

== Planning ==
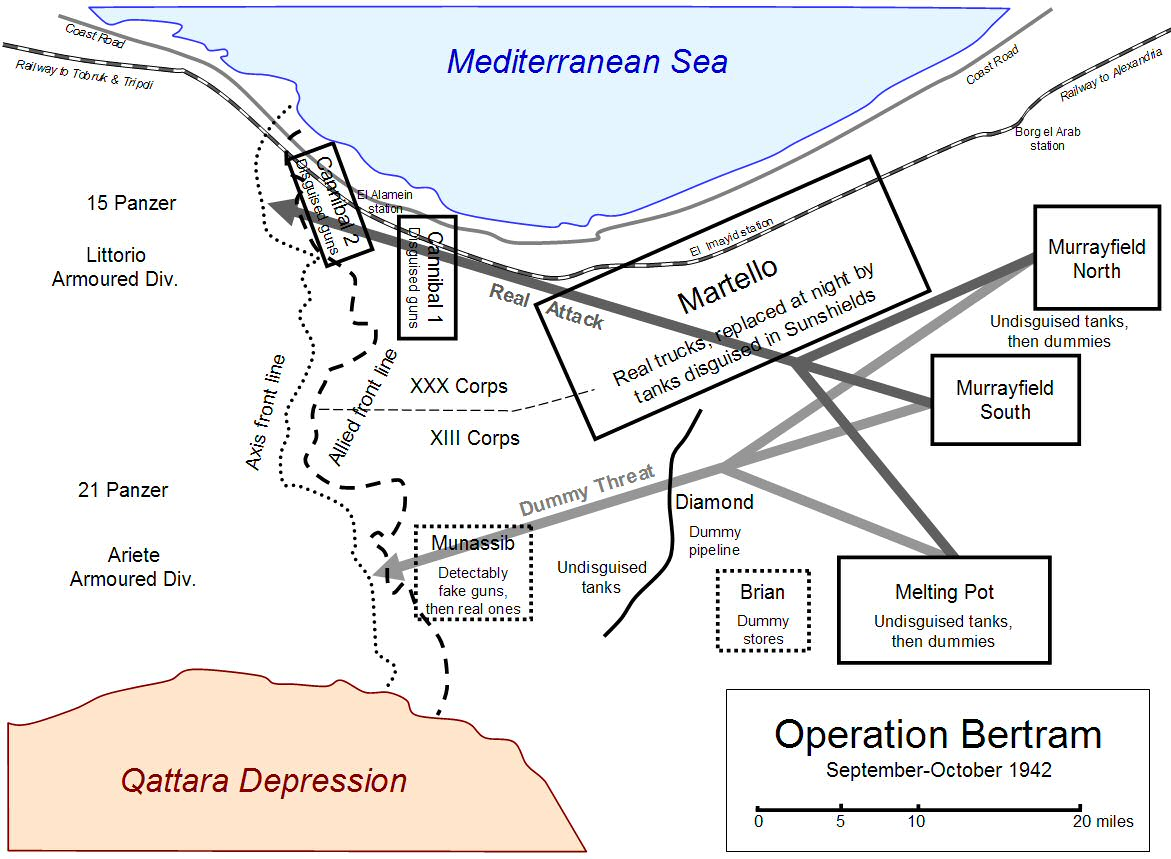
Map of Operation Bertram

Bertram was devised by Dudley Clarke to deceive Erwin Rommel about the timing and location of the expected allied attack by the Eighth Army. It consisted of physical deceptions using dummies and camouflage, concealing real movements, in particular of Montgomery's armour. Bertram was accompanied by electromagnetic deceptions codenamed "Operation Canwell" using false radio traffic. The front line was relatively short: it stretched from the Mediterranean Sea in the north, near El Alamein railway station, to the effectively impassable Qattara Depression in the south, a distance of only about 30 miles (48 km). It was therefore clear to the enemy that the attack must come in this space, and since the only road was in the north, surprise and full-scale attack in any other location might have been thought unlikely. The deceptions were planned to make the enemy believe that the attack would take place to the south, far from the coast road and railway, and about two days later than the real attack.

Soon after his arrival on 8 August 1942, the new Middle East commander, Harold Alexander, visited Geoffrey Barkas's camouflage unit at Helwan to assess its ability to implement Bertram. He looked at everything intently, but seemed most interested in the woodworking shop.

On 16 September 1942, Freddie de Guingand, Montgomery's chief of staff, summoned Barkas and Tony Ayrton to Eighth Army headquarters near Borg-el-Arab. He told them this was to be top secret, that Alexander had been impressed by his visit to Helwan, and that he wanted Camouflage's advice. He introduced Charles Richardson, who worked for Dudley Clarke's secretive 'A' Force and was to implement the deception Montgomery needed. Richardson had not been trained in deception planning, given the accelerated training of staff officers in 1940, nor had he ever prepared a deception plan before. He was determined it should succeed, since, as he wrote, "if it failed it would do far more damage than having no plan at all". De Guingand outlined the basic plan: an attack in the north, along the line of the coast road, with a feint some 20 miles (32 km) to the south. The tanks would take two days to move into battle position from their forming-up positions. Engineering work was already under way. He then astonished them by asking them to hide the hundreds of tanks and field guns, and the thousands of tons of matériel, that were to be used for the decisive attack at El Alamein. Barkas had been hoping for such an opportunity, and now he was being offered the chance to camouflage perhaps the largest desert battle ever attempted.

Barkas and Ayrton went out onto the beach dunes to sit and think. Barkas recalled the sacked Jasper Maskelyne, a stage magician who had briefly worked for him, saying he needed his vanishing tricks now. Ayrton agreed, suggesting they use Sunshields to make the tanks seem to be trucks, and vice versa. By the end of that afternoon they had typed up a plan and presented it to de Guingand and Richardson. They proposed to create two dummy armoured brigades to deploy in the south. They would give the appearance of not being ready by making it seem the tanks had not moved from their forming-up areas (Murrayfield and Melting Pot). Dummy tanks would replace them there; while they would mimic trucks when they arrived in the forward Martello area.

Richardson asked if they could use something like Steven Sykes's dummy railhead which had worked so well at Misheifa. Barkas answered that he intended to build a dummy water pipeline to go down south, and to be obviously not ready.

Within two weeks Barkas's plan was accepted, but with one change requested by Montgomery: the dummy armour was doubled to represent a whole armoured corps of over 600 vehicles. Richardson integrated the camouflage plan with the main plans: in Barkas's words, Richardson "amplified it a great deal to fit in with all the other major considerations, which he knew and I didn't."

Barkas, a former film director, was set to work "on the task of providing props for the biggest 'film production' on which I ever expect to be engaged". Work began on 27 September, giving four weeks before the day of the attack.

== Execution ==
The operation had two aims: creating the appearance of army units where none existed and concealing the real armour, artillery and matériel at the front. Barkas observed that "the concealment of the huge assembly of the Armoured Corps was essentially a piece of military planning by Army Headquarters, with Camouflage carrying out certain specific tasks". Since it would be impossible to hide the existence of such a large number of vehicles, especially of tanks in the Martello area, Barkas planned instead to make the vehicles there quite obvious, as trucks, well before battle. The tanks, too, would be openly displayed, far behind the battle front. When the enemy saw that nothing seemed to be happening, the trucks would be replaced by tanks, masquerading as trucks. That meant that the tanks, too, would have to be seen not to move so they would all be replaced with dummies. An unprecedented and "formidable" number of dummies were required: more than 400 tanks, 100 guns, and nearly 2,000 soft-skinned vehicles.

Different techniques were used for each task. The British Army had intentionally recruited designers, architects and artists for camouflage work. Tony Ayrton was a painter, son of the architect Maxwell Ayrton. Brian Robb had arrived more informally: he joined the army as a private, but Barkas noticed him and made use of his skills as an artist, teacher and illustrator by having him speedily promoted to Staff Lieutenant. Ayrton and Robb became Barkas's "GSO2"s, his senior staff officers, and they supervised the camouflage schemes used in Operation Bertram.

Three companies of Pioneers were assigned to Barkas's command to carry out the physical work of making the thousands of dummies. They came respectively from East Africa, Mauritius and the Seychelles. One company worked the standard bed frame palm hurdles into the required shapes and fixed them together to make tank bodies, turrets and other dummy vehicle elements. The second company prepared hessian covers for the vehicle elements. The third company painted and prepared the dummies to the required degree of realism. No. 1 Camouflage Company, Royal Engineers, a unit composed of Jews from Mandatory Palestine, provided assistance to the Pioneer companies.

=== "Sunshields" for tanks ===
Wavell's handwritten note and sketch proposing the Sunshield, 23 April 1941

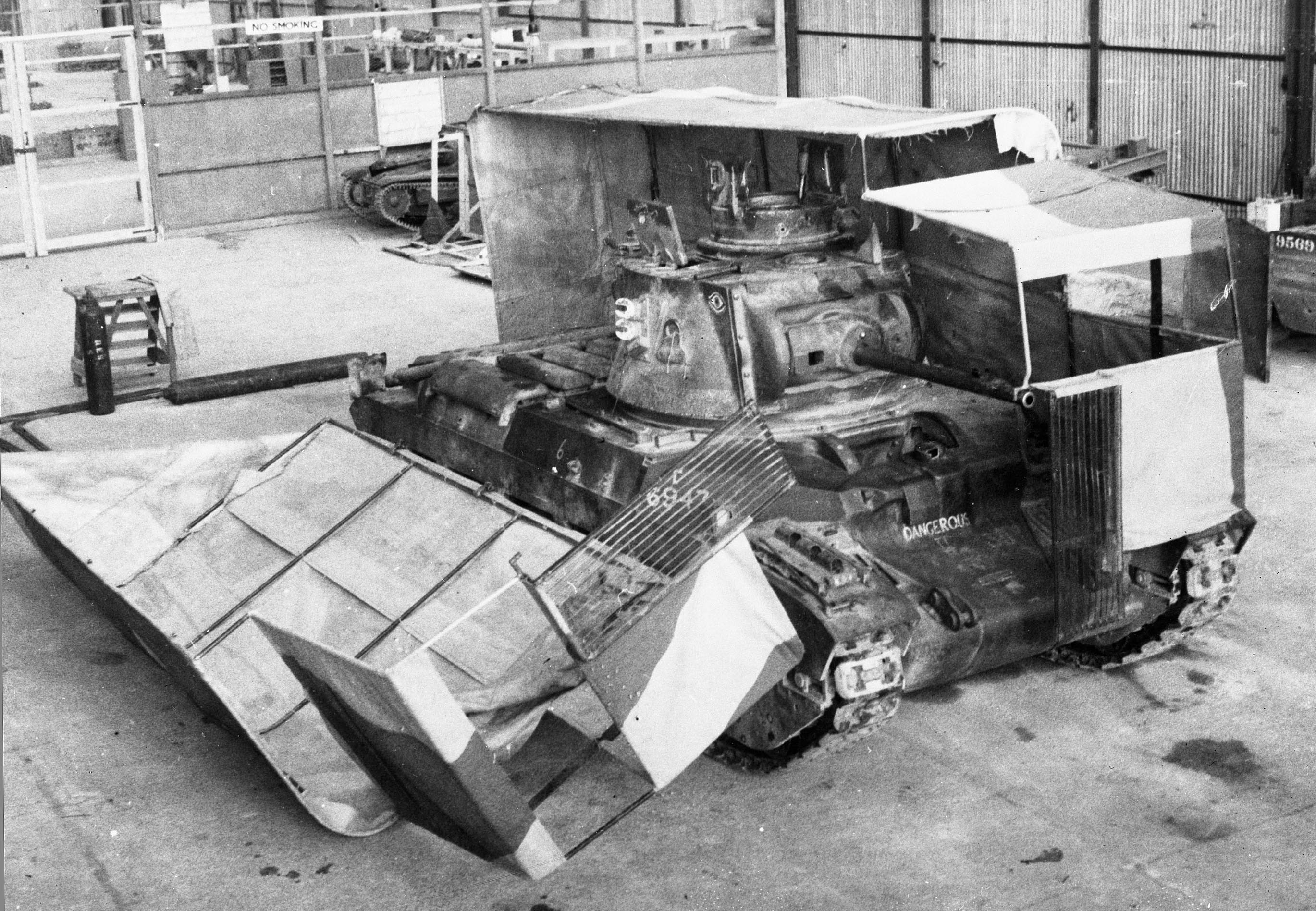
'Sunshield' half open at the Camouflage Development and Training Centre, Helwan, 1941

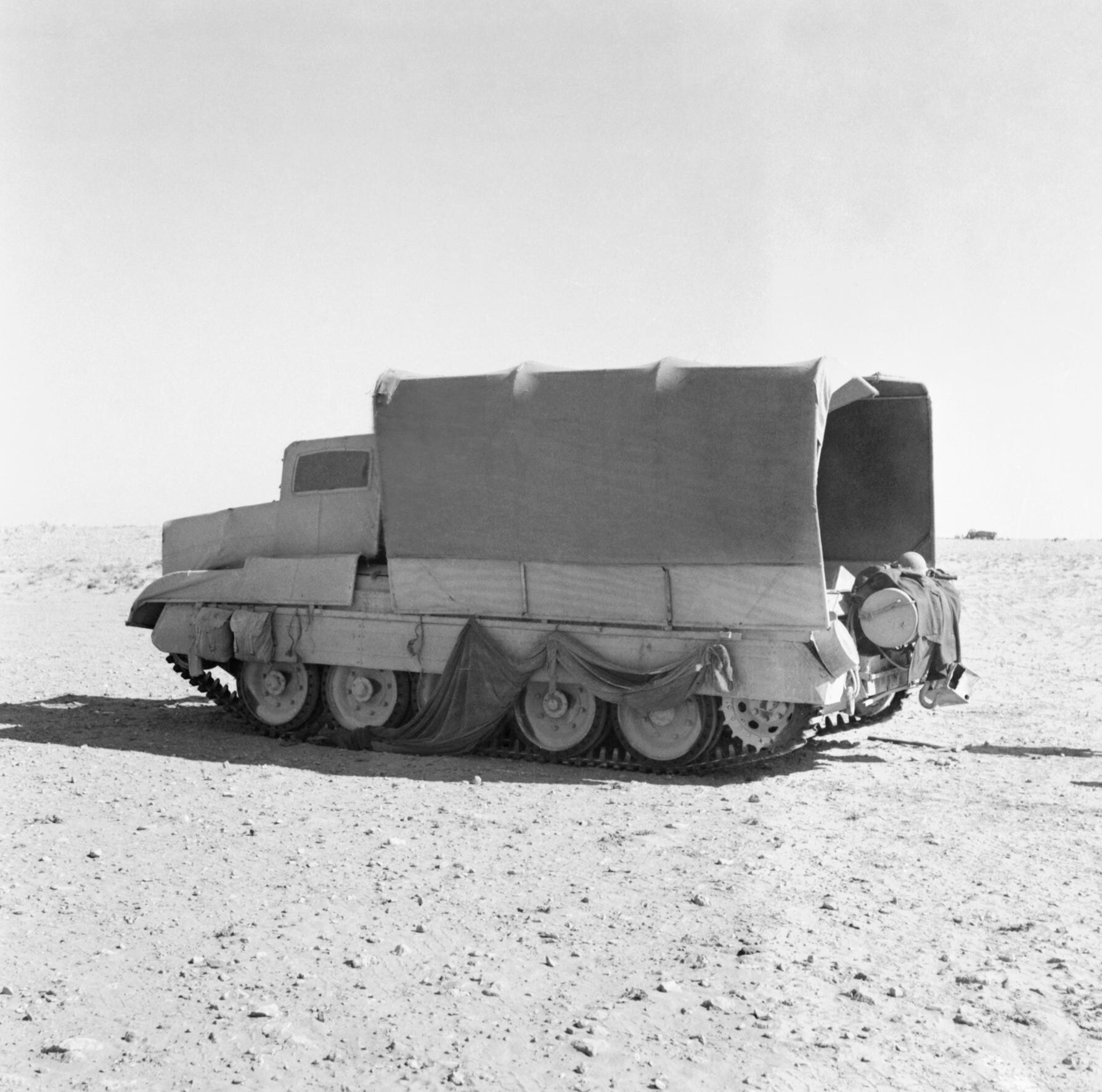
A Crusader tank in open desert, masquerading as a truck in its 'Sunshield'

Real tanks were disguised as trucks, using light "Sunshield" canopies. They were made in two halves, which hinged on the sides of the tank. A half could be lifted by two men and fitted or removed in a few minutes. Different models of Sunshield existed to fit the various types of Allied tank which included Crusaders, Valentines, Grants and Shermans, mimicking different kinds of truck.

A total of 722 Sunshields were deployed in Bertram. According to Peter Forbes, "Sunshields were the most successful and the most exhilaratingly mimetic of the deceptions practised in the desert."

The idea for the Sunshield came from Commander-in-Chief Middle East, General Wavell himself. He sketched a tank mimicking a truck in a handwritten note:

Is it a wild idea that a tank could be camouflaged to look like a lorry from air by light canvas Screen over top (sketch) It ~~might~~ would be useful during approach march etc. Please have it considered. 23/4 Wavell

— Archibald Wavell

The note was passed to Barkas, in his words "not long after my arrival in Middle East... The whole idea was there. It was only a matter of design, development, and arrangements for manufacture." The first heavy wooden prototype was made in 1941 by Jasper Maskelyne, who gave it the name Sunshield. 12 men were needed to lift it, and it disintegrated on its first trial run on a Crusader tank. However, Barkas had enough confidence in the Sunshield to ask for a lighter version. The Mark 2 Sunshield was made of canvas stretched over a light steel tube frame. It was strong, light, and cheap to manufacture. And crucially, from as low as 500 feet, RAF pilots found that the Mark 2 convincingly resembled a truck.

The 722 Sunshields were carefully pre-positioned in the Martello tank-holding area near El Imayid railway station. Each was numbered. The crew of each tank was brought to Martello, told their number, shown where they would be parked and taught how to put up and take down the Sunshield, which they would have to do at night.

=== "Cannibals" for field guns ===
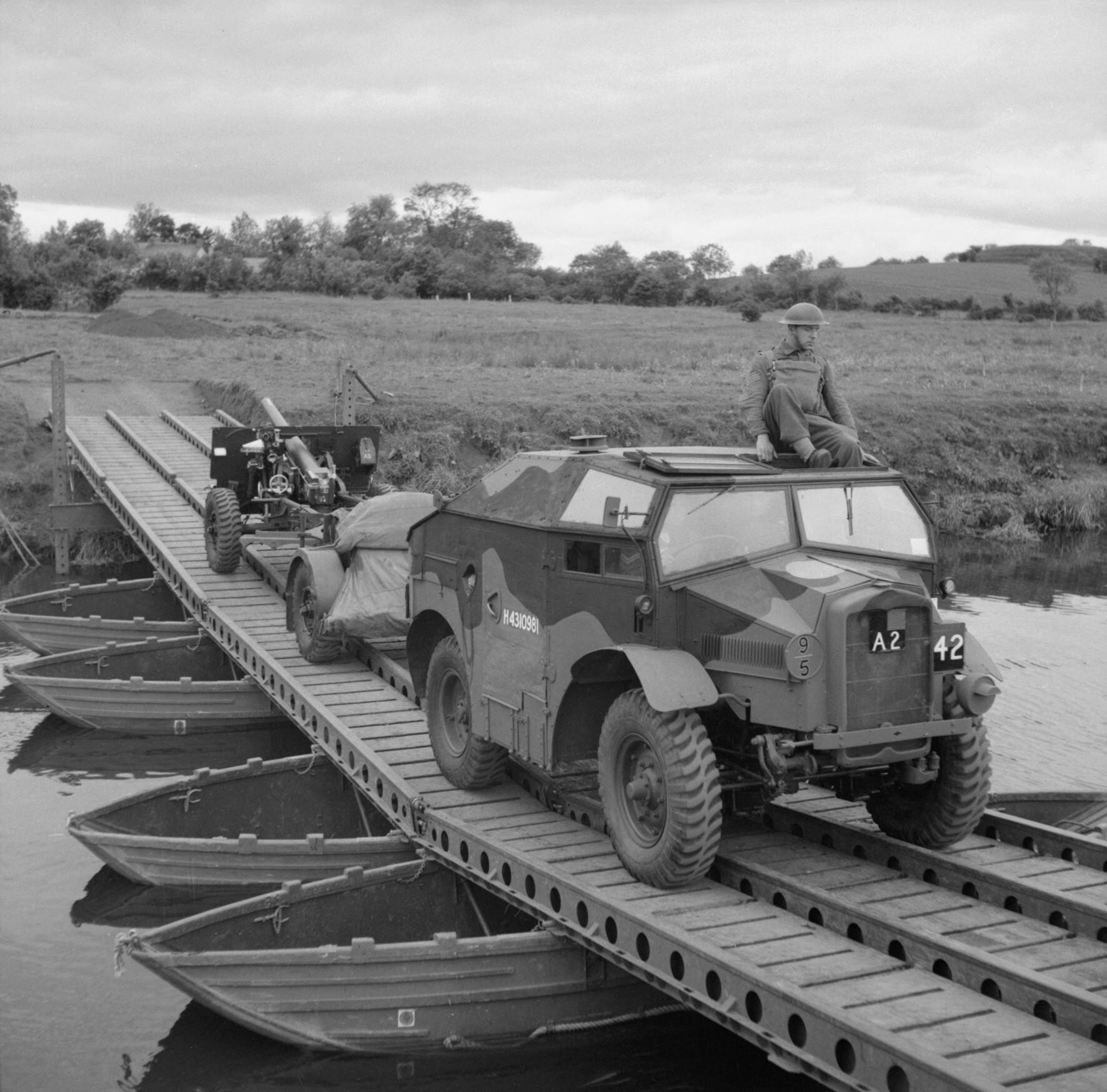
The distinctive shape of a "Quad" tractor pulling a limber and 25 pounder gun

Sketch by artist and camouflage officer Brian Robb of the 'Cannibal' method of disguising guns

Field guns and their limbers were disguised as British "3-tonner" trucks, under the direction of Tony Ayrton and Brian Robb. They arranged for the long towing pole of the limber to overlap the trail of the gun and then put up a dummy truck canopy over both. The real wheels of both the gun and the limber added to the realism of the dummy truck, as they remained visible under the canopy, exactly where the truck's wheels ought to be. The technique was named "Cannibal" because the gun and limber were "eaten up" by the canopy.

The extremely distinctive Morris C8 four wheel drive tractors, known as "Quads" that pulled the 25 pounder guns and their limbers also had to be disguised, as their presence directly advertised the presence of artillery. They were more simply camouflaged, again as trucks with real wheels, by draping a net over four poles tied to the sides of the vehicle and braced with guy ropes.

A total of 360 Cannibals were deployed in Bertram. The rear artillery concentration area and the forward artillery barrage area near El Alamein station were named Cannibal I and Cannibal II, respectively, after the camouflage technique. In Barkas's own words

the great concentration of 25-pounders... seems to have been quite undetectable right up to the instant when its disguise was thrown off and the gunners opened fire.

— Geoffrey Barkas

=== Real and dummy matériel ===
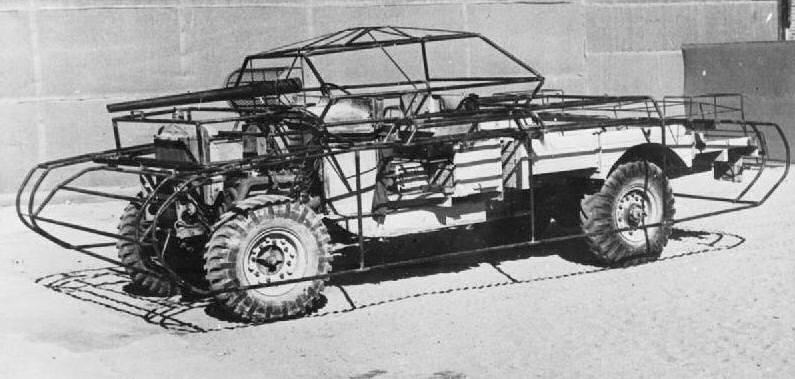
A mobile dummy: frame of a dummy tank over a truck chassis at the Middle East School of Camouflage near Cairo, photo by Captain Gerald Leet, 1942

Petrol cans were stacked along the sides of existing revetted trenches near El Alamein railway station. It was found by experiment that when they were hidden in the shadows in that way, they were invisible from the air and so 2,000 tons of petrol were thus stored. Over 100,000 four-gallon petrol tins (Note: An imperial gallon of petrol weighs about 7 pounds. A British long ton is 2,240 pounds. 2,000 tons would be 640,000 gallons or 160,000 four-gallon cans, not counting the weight of containers) were stacked in the 100 stone-faced slit trenches.

Food was stacked in piles of boxes, and draped with camouflage nets to resemble trucks: a large box-shaped pile for the truck's body, and smaller piles for the truck's cab and engine. That meant that attractive materials including sugar and cigarettes were dispersed around the desert instead of being in readily-guarded camps. The most desirable items were therefore put in the "trucks" in the middle of the areas and hidden in the middle of each stack, and army command accepted the risk of theft.

While the real supplies in the north were carefully hidden, matching dummy supplies had to be created in the south. In the area named Brian after camouflage officer Brian Robb, over 700 dummy stacks, representing food, petrol, ammunition and other supplies, were constructed.

Static dummy tanks and guns were made mainly of local materials including calico and palm-frond hurdles. Some dummy tanks were mobile, consisting of light frames placed over jeeps. A total of 500 dummy tanks and 150 dummy guns were constructed.

One night shortly before the battle, a powerful dust storm destroyed many of the dummy vehicles. Ayrton worked throughout that night and all the following day to restore the "film set" to an appearance of reality. The Axis command did not notice the breakdown of the illusion. The Royal Air Force had established air superiority by 18 October and completely excluded German reconnaissance aircraft from the Bertram area from then until battle commenced.

=== Double bluff ===
On the edge of the Munassib Depression, Bertram risked a double bluff. From 15 October 1942, a week before the attack, Camouflage constructed three and a half dummy field regiments of artillery. (Note: A field regiment of artillery had twenty-four guns when at full strength: three batteries, each of two troops of four guns. Barkas thus implies 84 dummy guns at Munassib) They were carefully made to appear seriously camouflaged, but day by day, they were maintained less and less well, to allow the enemy to decide it was facing dummy guns at Munassib. When the real battle had begun, the dummies were replaced at night with real artillery, which then kept utterly still for a day. An Axis tank attack on Munassib was shocked to find itself being fired on by the massed "dummy" guns.

=== Final stages ===
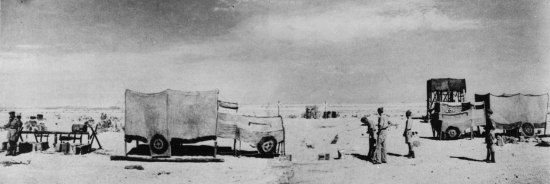
Operation Bertram dummy vehicles and filling station at Diamond dummy water pipeline, October 1942

To achieve the deception, trucks were parked openly in the tank assembly area for some weeks. Real tanks were similarly parked openly, far behind the front. Two nights before the attack, the tanks replaced the trucks and were covered with "Sunshields" before dawn. The tanks were replaced that same night with dummies in their original positions so that the armour remained seemingly two or more days' journey behind the front line. To reinforce the impression that the attack was not ready, a dummy water pipeline was constructed in "Operation Diamond", at an apparent rate of 5 miles per day. Two of Barkas's camouflage officers, Phillip Cornish and Sidney Robinson, supervised the work. Some days' worth remained to be built at the time of the actual attack. The pipeline was supported by dummy pump-houses, overhead tanks and filling stations, complete with straw men. Real traffic was made to drive nearby to create tracks.

== Results ==
After the battle, the captured German panzerarmee general Wilhelm Ritter von Thoma told Montgomery that he had believed the allies had at least one more armoured division than they did, and that the attack would be in the south. Rommel's stand-in, general Georg Stumme, thought the attack would not begin for several weeks. German documents and prisoners of war confirmed that the German commanders had believed in the existence of the decoy unit, and had not anticipated the true avenue of attack. Bertram had succeeded in all its objectives.

On 11 November 1942, Winston Churchill described the battle at El Alamein to the House of Commons, London and praised the success of Operation Bertram:

By a marvellous system of camouflage, complete tactical surprise was achieved in the desert. The Xth Corps, which he had seen from the air exercising fifty miles in the rear, moved silently away in the night, but leaving an exact simulacrum of its tanks where it had been, and proceeded to its points of attack.

— Winston Churchill, 1942 (Note: In Hansard as "Debate on the address " House of Commons Debates 11 November 1942 vol 385 cc8-56)

== Sources ==
Books

- Barkas, Geoffrey; Barkas, Natalie (1952). The Camouflage Story (from Aintree to Alamein). Cassell.
- Crowdy, Terry (2008). Deceiving Hitler: Double Cross and Deception in World War II. Osprey. ISBN 978-1-84603-135-9.
- Fisher, David (2005). The War Magician: The Man who Conjured Victory in the Desert. Phoenix. ISBN 0-304-36709-5.
- Forbes, Peter (2009). Dazzled and Deceived: Mimicry and Camouflage. Yale. pp. 155–156. ISBN 978-0-300-12539-9.
- Latimer, Jon (2002). Alamein. Harvard University Press. ISBN 0-674-01016-7.
- Lucas, James Sydney (1983). War in the Desert: The Eighth Army at El Alamein. Beaufort Books. ISBN 0-8253-0153-X.
- Richardson, Charles (1985). Flashback: A Soldier's Story. Kimber. ISBN 0-718-30567-1.
- Stroud, Rick (2012). The Phantom Army of Alamein: How the Camouflage Unit and Operation Bertram Hoodwinked Rommel. Bloomsbury. ISBN 978-1-4088-2910-3.
- Sykes, Steven (1990). Deceivers Ever: Memoirs of a Camouflage Officer. Spellmount. ISBN 0-946771-54-5.

Websites

- Imperial War Museum (2012). "Camouflage and the Desert War". Dummy tank under construction, 1942. Imperial War Museum. Archived from the original on 7 November 2012.
- The National Archives (2012). "Western Europe 1939–1945: Deception and Bluff". Did the British really employ magicians and practical jokers? WO 201/2841. The National Archives.
- "Jewish Volunteer Units in the British Army". The Chaim Herzog Museum of the Jewish Soldier in World War II. 2026.
