= Tom Grimsey =

English sculptor (1960–2014)

Tom Grimsey (1960–2014) was an English sculptor and teacher. He created many public sculptures by commission, which stand in locations in Britain.

== Life ==
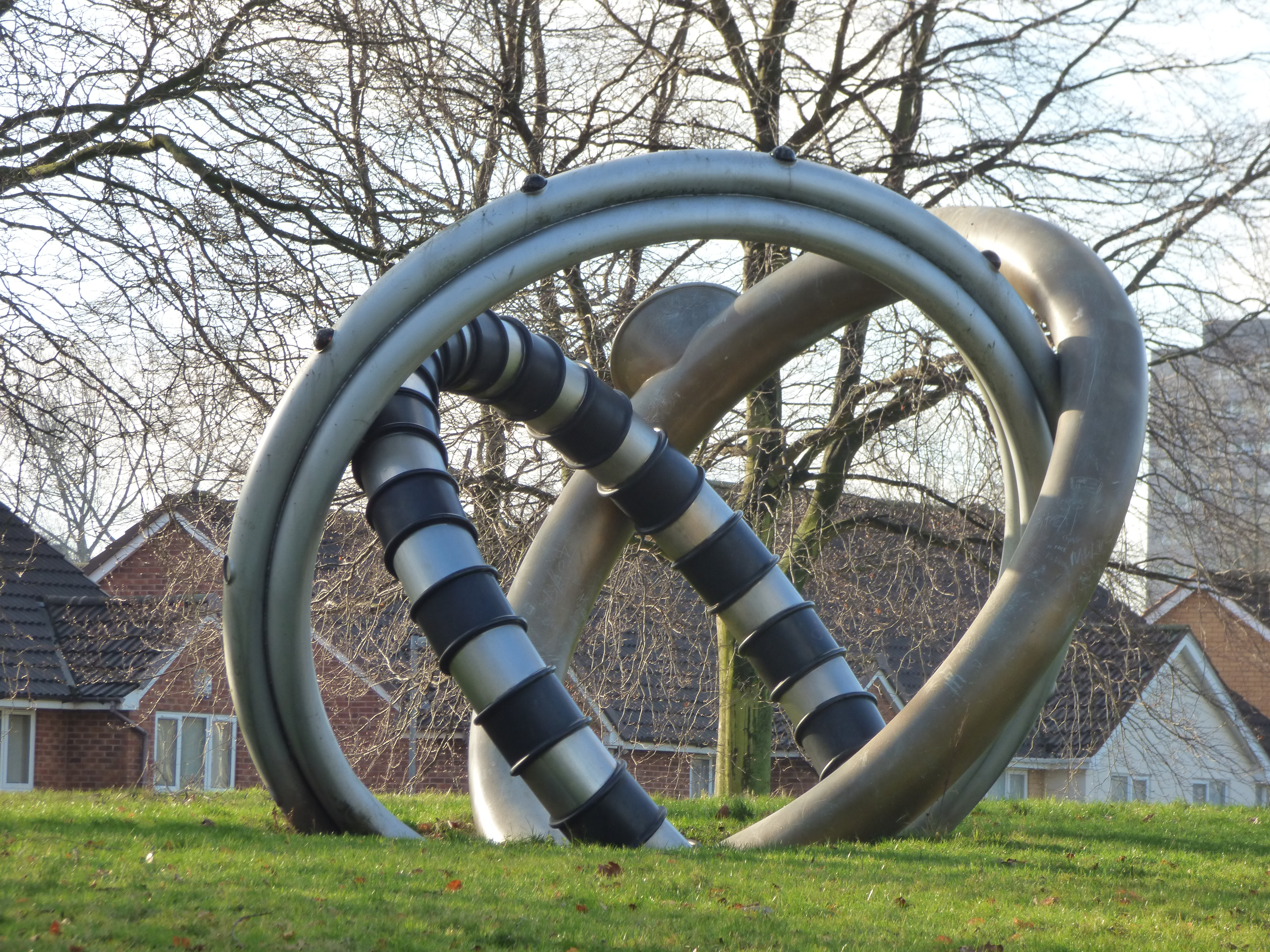
"Newtown Jewels", in Birmingham

Grimsey was born in Highgate in London. He studied at Wimbledon College of Arts from 1979 to 1982, and at St Martin's College from 1982 to 1983, where he began to work particularly in welded metal sculptures. He was a Henry Moore Sculpture Fellow from 1990 to 1991, and was an artist-in-residence at several organisations. From 2003 he taught at the University of Brighton, from 2008 as head of sculpture, until his death.

He was concerned that there should be collaboration between art and science, and was particularly interested in nanoscience. Working with scientists on a project funded by EPSRC to develop a "Directed Reconfigurable Nanomachine", he created kinetic installations showing the patterns created by moving molecules. This was the basis of the exhibition Giants of the Infinitesimal, held at the Science and Industry Museum in Manchester in 2011 and at the Magna Science Adventure Centre in Sheffield in 2012. He was the co-author, with the science writer Peter Forbes, of Nanoscience: Giants of the Infinitesimal (2014).

He was married to Susan Postlethwaite, and they had two children. Grimsey died in 2014, after suffering from cancer.

== Works ==
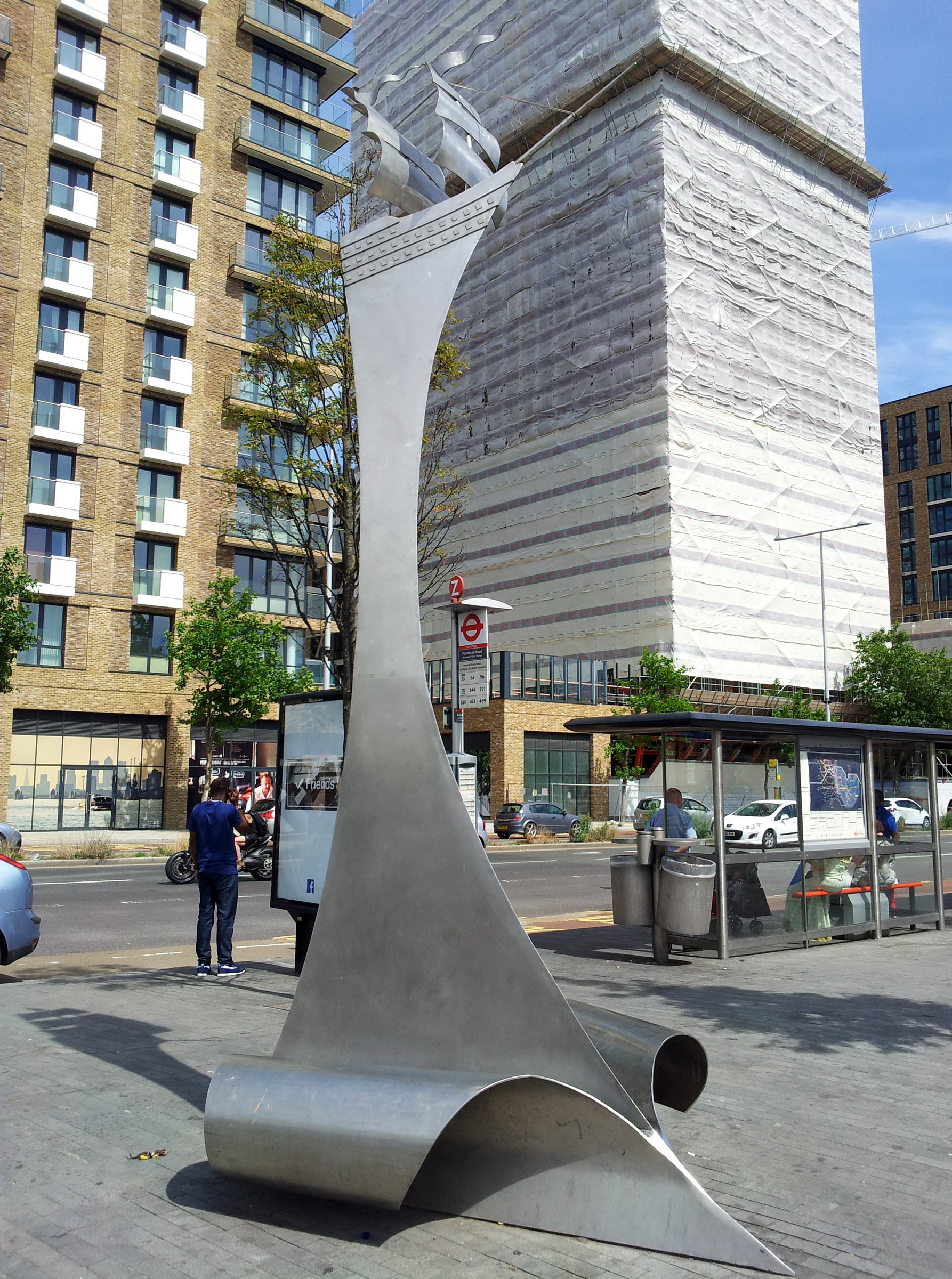
"The Woolwich Ship"

His works include the following:

"Newtown Jewels", of 1998, is situated in Burbury Park, Newtown, Birmingham, near the Jewellery Quarter, and was commissioned by Newtown South Aston City Challenge, Birmingham City Council and West Midlands Arts. it is a steel sculpture, height 4 metres (13 ft). The artist worked with local children to develop the design; the three interlocked rings each relate to the design of real pieces of jewellery.

"The Woolwich Ship", of 1999, is a steel sculpture situated in Plumstead Road in the Royal Borough of Greenwich. It was commissioned by the Woolwich development Agency and Greenwich Council. The work commemorates Woolwich, particularly the Woolwich Dockyard.

"Northam Shoal", of 2002, was commissioned by Southampton City Council. It is a steel sculpture by the artist and MJF Precision Welding, height 12 metres (39 ft), situated in Old Northam Road. A shoal of about 1,000 stainless steel fish are lit by fibre optics in a sequence so that the shoal appears to move in a spiral.

"The Flowering of the Lort Burn", in Leazes Park, Newcastle upon Tyne, is a line of panels displaying flowers, set into the ground, representing the underground route of the Lort Burn. The alternative name of the burn is the Florid Burn, meaning "abounding in flowers".
