= Geoffrey Barkas =

British filmmaker and camoufleur (1896–1979)

- Barkas in uniform in the First World War, c. 1917
- Born: Geoffrey de Gruchy Barkas; 27 August 1896; Richmond, Surrey, England
- Died: 3 September 1979 (aged 83); Esher, Surrey, England
- Occupation: Film maker
- Known for: Operation Bertram

Geoffrey Barkas (born Geoffrey de Gruchy Barkas, 27 August 1896 – 3 September 1979) was an English filmmaker active between the World War I and World War II. Barkas led the British Middle East Command Camouflage Directorate in the Second World War. His largest "film set" was Operation Bertram, the army-scale deception for the battle of El Alamein in October 1942.

== Early life ==
Barkas was born in 1896 in Richmond, Surrey where his father was a librarian, to parents from Jersey families. His father was Albert Atkin Barkas (born 1861), and his mother was Anna Julia de Gruchy (born 1863); both were from St. Helier.

In the First World War, he served in the 1915 Gallipoli campaign at Suvla Bay, and then in the later part of the Battle of the Somme in France, where he won a Military Cross.

== Film career ==
Between the wars, Barkas worked on silent films and then feature films, starting as a writer and producer, and then directing his own films such as The Manitou Trail and The Lumberjack (1925) and The Third Gun (1929), the latter being a three-reel short filmed in the Phonofilm sound-on-film process. He co-directed with Michael Barringer (Blockade, Q-ships, The Infamous Lady), Anthony Asquith (Tell England), Berthold Viertel (Rhodes of Africa) and Milton Rosmer (The Great Barrier), he also edited Red Ensign directed by Michael Powell. Work became increasingly difficult to find in the economic depression of the 1930s, and after directing the critically acclaimed African exteriors for Robert Stevenson's King Solomon's Mines in 1937, it dried up altogether.

In 1927 he married scriptwriter Natalie Webb (1899–1979) in Wycombe, Buckinghamshire. She wrote an account in 1934 of the production of Barkas' film Palaver.

== WWII camouflage ==
=== Learning to teach camouflage ===
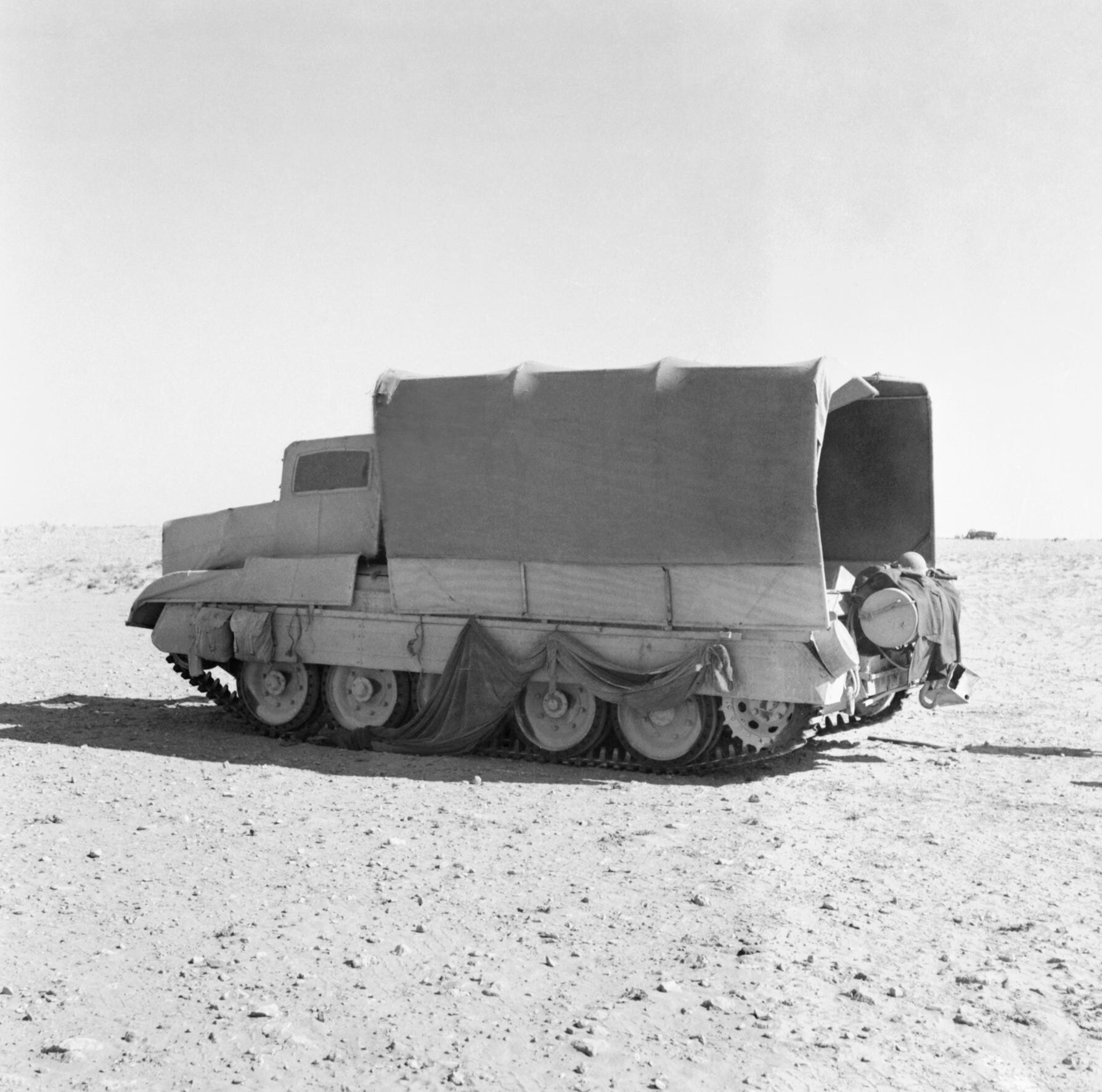
A British Crusader tank with its 'sunshield' lorry camouflage erected, 26 October 1942 (during the Battle of El Alamein)

Having found life hard in the film industry during the depression in 1937, Barkas joined Shell-Mex/BP under Jack Beddington, who guided Barkas into military camouflage. In May 1940, he was rapidly drafted into the Royal Engineers with a summary 10-day basic training course, followed by a camouflage course at the Royal Artillery camp at Larkhill, (Note: The camouflage centre at Farnham Castle had not yet been established.) where modern concerns such as hiding from aerial and infrared photography were taught alongside traditional techniques.

He began in Northern Ireland in 1940, teaching army drivers how to camouflage their vehicles. He found that they regarded their camouflage nets as "cloak[s] of invisibility", and in consequence, would park trucks out in the open, covered by nets not "garnished" with the provided strips of canvas or hessian. His response was to print a training pamphlet, designed to be entertaining as well as instructive. It contained "an instructional poem" called The Sad Story of George Nathaniel Glover. Glover was a driver who "never, never could be made/ To Park his Lorry in The Shade" and who uses a net "Which he had thrown across the bonnet, With not a stitch of garnish on it." The result is that a bomb falls exactly on target, and when his friends come to find him "Not One Trace did they discover of Driver George Nathaniel Glover". The army allowed the pamphlet to be published, and it became popular enough to spread from Northern Ireland across all British Army commands.

Barkas's next step was to run popular demonstrations of camouflage. He would assemble about 60 trucks, coaches, and smaller vehicles and discuss with the non-commissioned officers how to hide these from the air. They would agree that a line of trucks could be parked by a hedge and all together draped with nets to appear as a thick belt of vegetation, or arrange a vehicle as a pitched-roof outhouse to a building. Then the commanders would arrive, and Barkas would give a speech about camouflage methods to defeat aerial reconnaissance. He would then signal the start, the unit would hide all its vehicles, and a moment later, using his film-making skill with timing, an aircraft would arrive and start observing. It rarely found more than a few of the vehicles.

The experience in northern Ireland gave Barkas the idea that every theatre of war is naturally patterned. When an army unit goes against the grain of the pattern, he reasoned, it becomes conspicuous; to hide, it has to go with the pattern. He developed a simple illustration of this point by dropping a collar stud on a carpet. When it fell on a plain area, it was easy to see; when in a patterned area, it had to be searched for.

=== Director of Camouflage ===
Barkas published the distinctive booklet Concealment in the Field in Cairo in 1941

At the end of 1940, Barkas and his camoufleurs were sent to Egypt, where he arrived on the Andes on New Year's Day 1941. He arranged a flight to observe the desert from the air, noting patterns that he named as "Wadi", "Polka Dot" and so on that he hoped to use for camouflage. During 1941 the structure of the camouflage unit changed and grew rapidly, at first with little official recognition and constantly shifting names. To get his fledgling unit recognised, he printed an unusually elegant booklet called "Concealment in the Field" in Cairo, (Note: The booklet states that it was produced by the "Camouflage Training and Development Centre", one of the names of the camouflage unit.) the idea being to produce something clear, readable, and above all obviously different from the mass of army manuals. He was surprised to have this at once recognised as an "operational requirement" by the British Army's Middle East Command, that is, as an essential item for every army unit.

Barkas set up the Middle East Camouflage Development and Training Centre (CDTC.ME) at Helwan, Egypt in November 1941, with the zoologist Hugh B. Cott as his chief instructor. He was promoted to the new position of "Director of Camouflage", with the rank of lieutenant-colonel.

=== Dummy railhead for Operation Crusader ===
Barkas further built up his unit's ability in deception by getting one of his best officers, the artist Steven Sykes to build a convincing dummy railway at Misheifa to divert enemy attention from the real railhead at Capuzzo, bringing materiel for Operation Crusader. This complex piece of deception involved 6 miles (9.7 km) of dummy railway, a dummy train, dummy sidings, and a selection of dummy tanks to look as if they had been delivered by the railway. More than 100 bombs were dropped on the Misheifa railhead, at least halving the attacks on the real thing at Capuzzo. Barkas noted that "camouflage men must be among the few otherwise sane beings who yearn to be bombed." The pioneering effort's success was achieved in a few weeks, amidst severe shortages of men and raw materials.

=== Deception for El Alamein ===
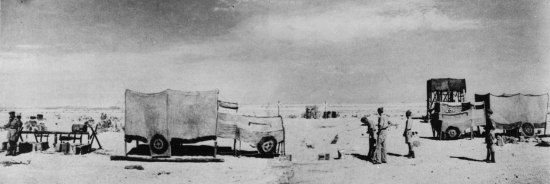
Barkas's biggest 'film production': Operation Bertram, the deception for the battle of El Alamein, October 1942

Barkas' camouflage unit helped Montgomery to victory at El Alamein through a large scale deception codenamed Operation Bertram which ran from August 1942 until the actual battle in October. Among other things, 600 tanks were disguised as supply lorries in the northern sector, while dummy tanks, supplies, and a complete dummy pipeline were deployed in the south. The deception succeeded, leading Rommel's staff to believe the allied attack would be in the south and to deploy substantial forces there. Barkas made Tony Ayrton his deputy for Bertram. Ayrton worked tirelessly to put in place all the complex schemes and to repair them when they were hit by a dust storm. Barkas described Operation Bertram as

the task of providing props for the biggest 'film production' on which I ever expect to be engaged

— Geoffrey Barkas

== Post-war ==
Cover of first edition of Barkas's autobiographical book, The Camouflage Story, 1952

After the war, Barkas returned to film-making, working for the Rank Organisation making children's films, including The Little Ballerina. He was made an Officer of the Most Excellent Order of the British Empire (OBE).

Barkas and his wife Natalie wrote about his experiences in his book The Camouflage Story (from Aintree to Alamein). The book explains the inside story of the use of camouflage to deceive the enemy as described by Winston Churchill in his speech on 11 November 1942, announcing victory after the Battle of El Alamein:

I must say one word about ... surprise and strategy. By a marvellous system of camouflage complete tactical surprise was achieved in the desert.

== Reception ==
Alan Burton writes that "Ultimately, though, [Barkas's film] Tell England extols the British class system: if modern war is unpleasant, young gentlemen, forged in the public schools, can nonetheless be counted upon to make the ultimate sacrifice and do their duty." Burton also quotes W.D. Routt, who describes Tell England as "a compounded act of disinheritance" of Australia's part in World War I but who also notes the "multiple expositions" of the film, "artistic, committed, sexy, evil". Routt justifies these descriptions with reference to the film's ambiguity about the morality of the war and its supposedly improper sexual subtexts. In other words, concludes Burton, we should not dismiss all such early "Great War" films as simple and naive.

Stephen Bourne writes that "Contemporary critics praised the quality of the African locations [in King Solomon's Mines], filmed by Geoffrey Barkas, and the tense atmosphere created in the scenes set in the African village and mines."

Barkas won an Oscar ("Best Live Action Short Film") in 1936 for his direction of Wings Over Everest. Wings over Everest was preserved by the Academy Film Archive in 2014, in partnership with the UCLA Film and Television Archive.

== Filmography ==
- Secrets of Nature, 1922
- White Water Men, 1925
- The Manitou Trail, 1925
- With the Lumberjacks, 1925
- Winter in Orlando
- Random Flakes, 1925
- Prospectin' Around, 1925
- Palaver, a Romance of Northern Nigeria, 1926
- The Somme, 1927
- Blockade, 1928, with Michael Barringer
- Q-ships, 1928, with Michael Barringer (Note: The art director on Q-Ships was Fred Pusey who became one of Barkas's camoufleurs.)
- The Infamous Lady, 1928, with Michael Barringer
- The Third Gun, 1929
- Tell England, 1931, with Anthony Asquith (The Battle of Gallipoli in USA)
- A Symphony of the Sea, 1933
- Secrets of India: The Fair City of Udaipur, 1934
- Wings Over Everest, 1934, with Ivor Montagu (Note: Ivor Montagu's brother Ewen Montagu masterminded another major World War II deception, Operation Mincemeat.)
- Red Ensign, 1934; directed by Michael Powell, edited by Barkas
- Rhodes of Africa, 1936, directed by Berthold Viertel; Barkas had shot the African location footage and battle scenes for the film a year prior
- The Great Barrier, 1937, (uncredited) with Milton Rosmer
- King Solomon's Mines, 1937, directed by Robert Stevenson; Barkas directed the African exteriors
- Rogue's March, 1953; directed by Allan Davis, but featuring 15 minutes of second unit footage shot in India by Barkas in January, February and March 1935 (prior to shooting his Rhodes of Africa footage) for an unproduced film version of Soldiers Three for Gaumont British

== Sources ==
- Barkas, Geoffrey; Barkas, Natalie (1952). The Camouflage Story (from Aintree to Alamein). Cassell.
- Fisher, David (2005). The War Magician: The True Story of Jasper Maskelyne. Phoenix.
- Forbes, Peter (2009). Dazzled and Deceived: Mimicry and Camouflage. Yale. pp. 155–156.
- Lucas, James Sydney (1983). War in the Desert: The Eighth Army at El Alamein. Beaufort Books.
- Burton, Alan (2002). Monk, Claire; Sargeant, Amy (eds.). British Historical Cinema (British Popular Cinema). Routledge. pp. 31–46.
- Richardson, Charles L. (1985). Flashback: A Soldier's Story. Kimber.
- Stroud, Rick (2012). The Phantom Army of Alamein: How the Camouflage Unit and Operation Bertram Hoodwinked Rommel. Bloomsbury.
- Sykes, Steven (1990). Deceivers Ever: The Memoirs of a Camouflage Officer. Spellmount.
