= Steven Sykes (artist) =

British artist and camoufleur (1914–1999)

- Artists at war: Edwin Galligan, Steven Sykes, Fred Pusey, Western Desert June 1942
- Born: Steven Barry Sykes; 30 August 1914; Formby, England, UK
- Died: 22 January 1999 (aged 84)
- Education: Royal College of Art, Herbert Hendrie
- Known for: Ceramics, mosaics, sculpture
- Notable work: Gethsemane Chapel in Coventry Cathedral
- Spouse: Jean Judd

Steven Barry Sykes (30 August 1914 – 22 January 1999) was a British artist, known for his Gethsemane Chapel in the rebuilt Coventry Cathedral. He was active in the British desert camouflage unit in the Second World War, and was responsible for the dummy railhead at Misheifa and for the effective camouflage and large-scale military deception in the defence of Tobruk in 1942.

== Early life ==
Sykes was born in Formby, Lancashire. His father was a family doctor, A. B. Sykes of Ashhurst, Formby. He went to the Oratory School at Caversham Park and studied stained glass design at the Royal College of Art. He won a travel scholarship to France and Italy in 1936 and on his return he joined Herbert Hendrie's stained glass studio in Edinburgh.

Sykes married artist Jean Judd in February 1940. At his death in 1999, he left two sons and a daughter.

== World War II camouflage ==
Sykes's RCA tutor, Barry Hart, who knew Freddie Beddington, founder of the Camouflage Development and Training Centre at Farnham Castle, suggested he become a camouflage officer. Richard Buckley, one of the Farnham lecturers, promptly recruited Sykes as an officer in the Royal Engineers. He was posted to France in March 1940 and evacuated from Dunkirk in May. Only then did he go on a camouflage training course at Farnham.

Sykes had a difficult start to his next posting, in the Middle East. He was almost killed in a car accident on a steep road to the Horns of Hattin in Palestine. His car was fired on by a French warship as he drove to Sidon; he noticed tiny flashes blinking on the side of the ship, shortly followed by explosions on the road in front of him. He was violently sick on an aerial reconnaissance flight, and he became ill with malaria, ending up in hospital in Jerusalem.

Sykes quickly realised that camouflage in the desert would need to use different techniques from those he had learnt at Farnham. He described how military units arrived in North Africa "with camouflage nets garnished in greens and browns suited to European landscapes and, as good disciplinarians, they had pegged them out stiffly over the pale sand round their halted vehicles".

The head of the British Middle East Command Camouflage Directorate in Egypt, Geoffrey Barkas, described Sykes as "an excellent camouflage officer technically, and one who thinks about camouflage in terms of battle." Barkas made Sykes the British Army's first ever "Grade 2 Camouflage Staff Officer".

=== Dummy railhead at Misheifa ===
Sykes's first job as Camouflage Staff Officer was to camouflage the "enormous" 70-mile-long (110 km) railway line from the sea to the railhead at Misheifa, essential to bring up military materiel for Operation Crusader. On timidly entering his first staff meeting, the commander, Brigadier Robertson, memorably asked him, "Who the hell are you?". Sykes replied "Camouflage, sir". Robertson showed Sykes the plan for the railhead with depot, marshalling yard, sidings, sheds and facilities. "How are you going to hide this lot then?", he asked. Sykes suggested a dummy railhead, and was astonished when the brigadier agreed. Later that same day, Sykes proposed a plan to build a 9-mile (14 km) dummy railway ending in a real-looking terminus complete with sidings and buildings. The dummy had two purposes: to divert aerial attacks from the real railhead, and to deceive the enemy into believing that the British attack would not begin until the dummy was completed. Sykes was determined not to make the mistake of the new units with easily spotted camouflage nets. He asked the Royal Air Force to fly him over the real railhead to see what a mock-up would have to resemble. His plan was to make it good enough to deceive an observer flying at 500 feet (150 m) or higher, relying on the desert heat haze to make precise observation impossible. Materials were in short supply, so the available wood, just 5,000 feet (1,500 m) of timber, was doubled by laboriously splitting it in half lengthways, by hand. Since Sykes's calculations showed there would still not be enough material, he decided to scale the whole railway down to 2/3 of life size.

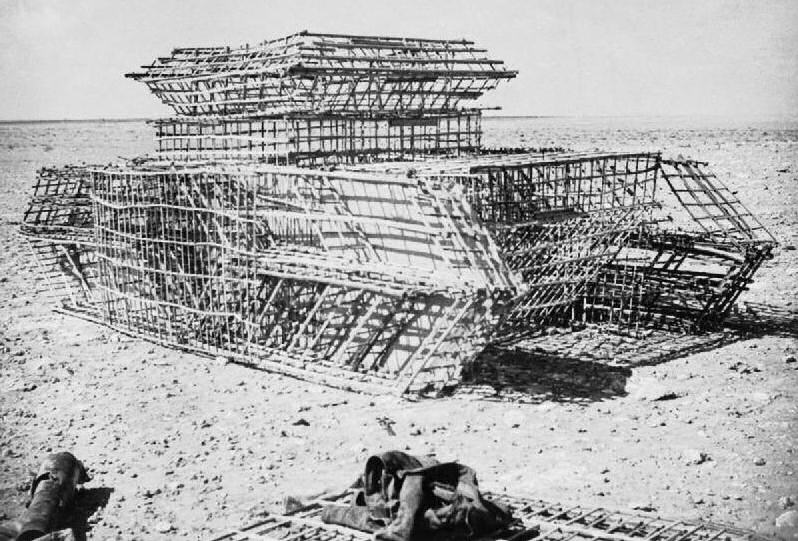
Dummy tank of the type used by Sykes and his team at Misheifa. The structure was made of gerida hurdling (woven palm frond fences) and covered by canvas and a garnished net.

The dummy railway wagons and other vehicles, including tanks, were built mainly from palm fronds, which were commonly woven into light hurdles in Egypt at that time. Some of the track was made from flimsy British 4-gallon petrol cans, hammered flat and then formed into shape over real steel rails. Then Sykes and the Camouflage Unit sat and waited for the dummy installation to be attacked. Barkas remarked "I think that camouflage men must be among the few otherwise sane beings who yearn to be bombed". Finally on 22 November 1941, amidst jokes about wooden bombs being dropped on wooden railways, about 9 real bombs were dropped. The camoufleurs over-excitedly let off all 11 flares to simulate fires and explosions caused by the bombing. A captured map showed the enemy had identified the dummy as a genuine railhead. Sykes had succeeded.

Julian Trevelyan visited Egypt to report back to London on the techniques that the Camouflage Unit were developing. Trevelyan described Sykes as "the most intelligent and sympathetic camouflage officer that I have yet met out here". The Commander-in-Chief of the Eighth Army, Lieutenant General Neil Ritchie, sent Sykes a signal:

Most Secret

To G 2 Cam: Will you please convey to all those concerned in the construction and maintenance of the Dummy R[ail] H[ead] my congratulations on the success which the scheme has achieved... Neil Ritchie, Lt. Gen. GOC-in-C Eighth Army

In February, after the retreat to Gazala, Sykes met the secretive Dudley Clarke, whom he described as "a very spruce, senior (and elderly) Staff Officer in an immaculate British camel-hair coat. There was an air of mystery about him." Sykes knew that Clarke "wielded deceptive powers via wireless messages and agents". Deception was moving from improvisation to strategic planning.

=== Dummy port at Ras al Hilal ===
The army was keen to follow up on the success with the dummy railhead, and late in December 1941 Sykes was asked by Brigadier General Staff, John Whitely, how he could protect the ports of Derna, Tobruk and Benghazi from bombing. Stroud suggested building a dummy port apparently suitable for handling large amounts of military materiel including tanks. Again, the goal was to distract the enemy from the real ports and waste effort on attacking the dummy instead. The plan was approved and named "Operation Belsea". Sykes chose Ras al Hilal, at the northernmost point of Libyan Cyrenaica. This was where Benito Mussolini had intended to build a magnificent port to welcome Italian settlers to the colony. The dummy installations included oil storage tanks made of wood, thin steel tubing and hessian cloth. A partially destroyed tunnel was made to look as if it was fully restored, using a gigantic "painted cloth", a canvas painted with a perspective of a working tunnel. The harbour was populated with dummy ships and jetties. By 25 January 1942 the dummy port was ready, and Sykes threw a party to celebrate. While the party was in full swing, an order arrived: Belsea was cancelled, as Rommel was advancing on Benghazi. Sykes destroyed all the plans, and burned or blew up all the dummy installations.

Sykes never got the chance to work on anything so large again. He missed out through illness and exhaustion on Operation Bertram, the major deception for the Second Battle of El Alamein: Barkas sent him by flying boat to Baghdad to recuperate, consoling him with promotion to General Staff Officer Grade 2. In Rick Stroud's view, Sykes had made an enormous contribution to British military camouflage. He had, writes Stroud, "helped change the notion that the desert was a hopeless place for camouflage, where the only thing to be done was to disperse vehicles. His deception schemes, especially the dummy railhead, had made the authorities realise that the rock and sand of the desert wasteland was a theatre where the enemy could be deceived by the substitution of the real for the false and vice versa". These ideas were put to the test by Barkas in Operation Bertram.

=== D-Day camouflage ===
In the D-Day landings of June 1944, Sykes camouflaged snipers and made screens to block enemy sight lines, just as he had done at Tobruk. The violent scenes made an impression on him which he sought to recreate in paintings and drawings.

== Artistic career ==
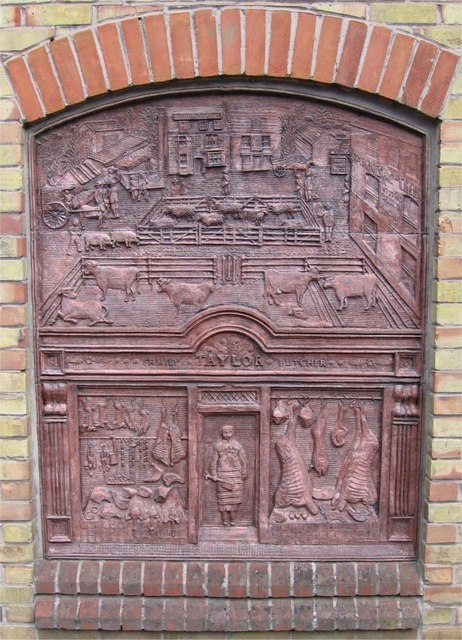
Steven Sykes panel, Sainsbury's (Braintree), Cattle Market

Steven Sykes is regarded as a significant 20th century artist and his work is cited in the listings of many important and highly regarded buildings by Historic England. The Twentieth Century Society has called him a "nationally significant artist", such that his former home is now a non-designated historic asset and there have been calls for it to be listed.

Sykes contributed artwork to many churches in the UK and had an association with architects such as Basil Spence and Gerard Goalen. Sykes worked with Spence on Coventry Cathedral, while Goalen commissioned works from Sykes in churches he was reordering or designing.

Sykes' career as an artist began when his wife Jean taught him pottery. He became an expert in making relief tiles and Picasso-like vases. He showed these at the 1951 Festival of Britain. Sykes taught at the Chelsea School of Art from 1946 to 1979. In 1947 he created a series of neo-Romantic landscape paintings and drawings.

He wanted to become known as a war artist, and while he produced a sequence on the D-Day landings, these may have been created after the war. His war art finally came to public notice in 1984 through a Sunday Times magazine feature on his D-Day watercolours. These were included in his 1990 book about his wartime exploits Deceptive Ever: The memoirs of a camouflage officer. Meanwhile, in 1989, the New York art dealer Guillaume Gallozzi included Sykes as a "discovery" in an exhibition of British war artists; a similar exhibition took place in 1990, in cooperation with the British Council USA, at the National Museum of the United States Navy in Washington DC. In 1992 Gallozzi mounted a group and a solo exhibition for Sykes.

=== Coventry Cathedral ===
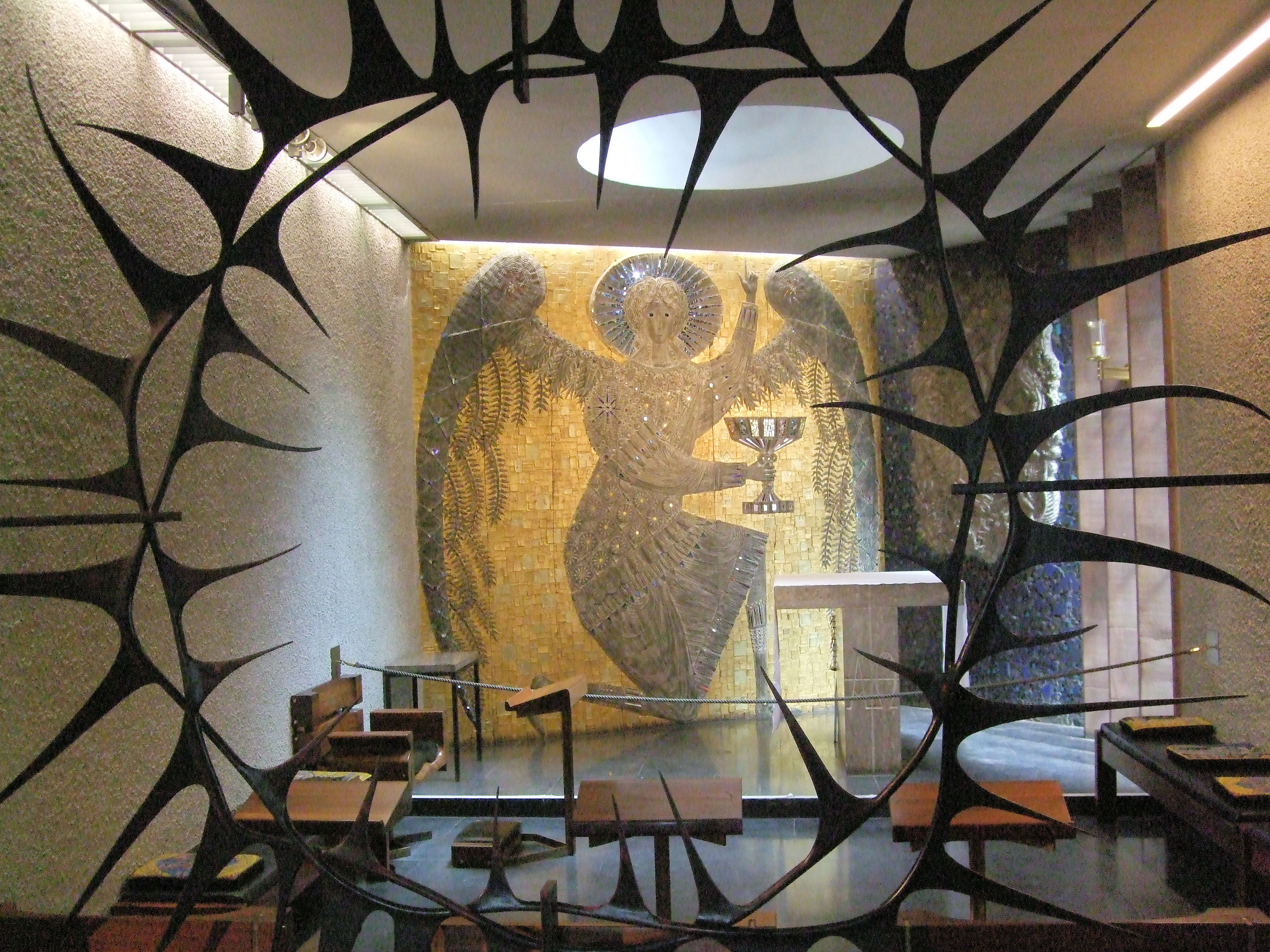
Chapel of Christ In Gethsemane, Coventry Cathedral, 1959–1960

One of Sykes's best-known works is the Gethsemane Chapel mosaic in The Cathedral of St Michael, Coventry. Sykes was invited to contribute to the cathedral by its architect, Basil Spence, who had himself also been a camouflage officer during the war. The figure of the "consciously Byzantine" angel, St Michael, and Jesus's disciples asleep at Gethsemane are modelled like his pottery figures in reverse relief, but then cast in concrete. The background is covered in gold leaf and blue tesserae, forming a mosaic. According to Tanya Harrod in The Independent, "The result was dazzling."

=== Our Lady Lillington ===
Sykes produced mosaic work for the Grade II listed Church of Our Lady, Lillington, Leamington Spa, with his work being part of the reason for the church's listing. Historic England describes Sykes' contribution as: "a glass mosaic designed and executed by Steven Sykes, who had created mosaic work at Basil Spence's Coventry Cathedral; it consists of the Chi-Rho symbol above an Alpha and Omega motif".

=== St Gregory, South Ruislip ===
In 1965 Sykes co-operated with the architect Gerard Goalen on the re-ordering of Grade II St Gregory the Great in South Ruislip, for which he produced a lintel sculpture. The scholar of architecture Robert Proctor says: "Goalen commissioned Sykes to make a bold sculptural lintel in bronze over the entrance."

Proctor goes on to comment that Patrick Reyntiens, who made the stained glass at St Gregory, and Ralph Beyer who carved inscriptions had both worked with Sykes at Coventry. In its listing of this church, Historic England says: "reflective of a culture of sacred art within the Catholic Church, and Goalen’s interest in the use of contemporary art in combination with architecture, St Gregory’s contains several notable works of art by a number of highly regarded C20 artists, including Patrick Reyntiens, Stephen Sykes, Dom Charles Norris and Willi Soukup".

=== British Pavilion ===
Basil Spence, who Sykes worked with on Coventry Cathedral, later invited Sykes to design the fountain sculpture for the British Pavilion at Expo 67 in Montreal.

=== War Memorial Chapel, National Cathedral, Washington DC ===
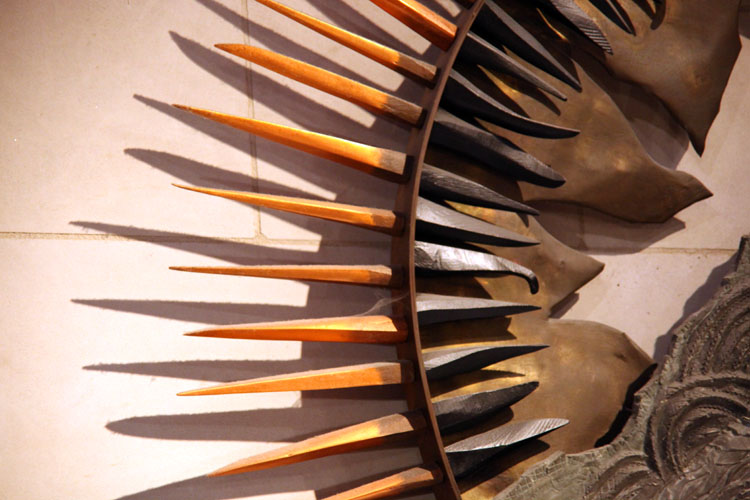
Detail of Sykes' Suffering Christ, War Memorial Chapel, Washington DC

"The chapel is centered around a powerful sculpture of The Suffering Christ above the altar by British artist Steven Sykes. It features a dramatically oversized head of the crucified Redeemer crowned with a halo of brass shapes simulating cannon shells and irregular rays of cast aluminum suggesting rays of glory."

— National Cathedral website

The chapel honours people who have served in the US military. Above the altar is an artwork called "The Suffering Christ" which was designed and executed by Sykes. The torn sheets of brass in the halo simulate brass cannon shells. The spikes inside the halo are cast aluminium-coloured to remind the viewer of barbed wire. The copper rays of light in the halo look like bayonets.

=== Phoenix School, Tower Hamlets ===
This Grade II* listed special school by Farquaharson and McMorran (1951–52) in Tower Hamlets includes four reliefs by Sykes which are noted in its listing.

=== Other works ===
In 1968, Sykes produced a large metal sculpture of Christ (Christus Resurrexit) to hang on the sanctuary wall of St Joseph Church, Retford, Nottinghamshire, which was being re-ordered by Gerard Goalen.

Sykes's artworks include several contributions to 'Pictures for Schools: Art, Education and Reconstruction in Post-war Britain'. Natalie Rose Bradbury notes: "He regularly submitted both drawings and works on paper to the scheme, as well as reliefs and sculptures. Many of them were themed around animals, and proved to be popular with child visitors".

His other works include:

- Tiles for the Dorchester Hotel
- A tapestry for Hammersmith and West London College Library
- Decorative relief panels for Sainsbury's in Braintree which depict the themes of food and drink
- Panels for the Pallant House Gallery in Chichester
- Two large murals for New Century Hall, Manchester which depict musicians (1963)

== See also ==
- List of camoufleurs

== Sources ==
=== Books ===
- Barkas, Geoffrey (1952). The Camouflage Story (from Aintree to Alamein). Barkas, Natalie. Cassell.
- Behrens, Roy R. (2009). Camoupedia: A Compendium of Research on Art, Architecture and Camouflage. Bobolink Books. p. 46.
- Crowdy, Terry (2008). Deceiving Hitler: Double-Cross and Deception in World War II. p. 340.
- Forbes, Peter (2009). Dazzled and Deceived: Mimicry and Camouflage. Yale. pp. 155–156.
- Fisher, David (1985). The War Magician: The True Story of Jasper Maskelyne. Corgi.
- Rankin, Nicholas (2008). Churchill's Wizards: The British Genius for Deception 1914-1945. Faber.
- Stroud, Rick (2012). The Phantom Army of Alamein: How the Camouflage Unit and Operation Bertram Hoodwinked Rommel. Bloomsbury.
- Sykes, Steven (1990). Deceivers Ever: The Memoirs of a Camouflage Officer. Tunbridge Wells: Spellmount.

=== Journals ===
- Art & Antiques. 1993. Steven Sykes. Volume 15. Page 86.
- The New Yorker. 1992. Review. F-R Publishing. Volume 68. Page 10.
