= Dazzled and Deceived =

Camouflage book by Peter Forbes

- Author: Peter Forbes
- Subject: Camouflage, mimicry
- Genre: Popular science
- Publisher: Yale University Press
- Publication date: 2009
- Awards: Warwick Prize for Writing

Dazzled and Deceived: Mimicry and Camouflage is a 2009 book on camouflage and mimicry, in nature and military usage, by the science writer and journalist Peter Forbes. It covers the history of these topics from the 19th century onwards, describing the discoveries of Henry Walter Bates, Alfred Russel Wallace and Fritz Müller, especially their studies of butterflies in the Amazon. The narrative also covers 20th-century military camouflage, begun by the painter Abbot Thayer who advocated disruptive coloration and countershading and continued in the First World War by the zoologist John Graham Kerr and the marine artist Norman Wilkinson, who developed dazzle camouflage. In the Second World War, the leading expert was Hugh Cott, who advised the British army on camouflage in the Western Desert.

The book was well received by critics, both military historians and biologists, and won the 2011 Warwick Prize for Writing.

== Book ==
=== Publication ===
Dazzled and Deceived was published by Yale University Press in 2009 in English and also translated into Korean.

The book contains 34 colour plates and six monochrome maps and drawings.

=== Contents ===
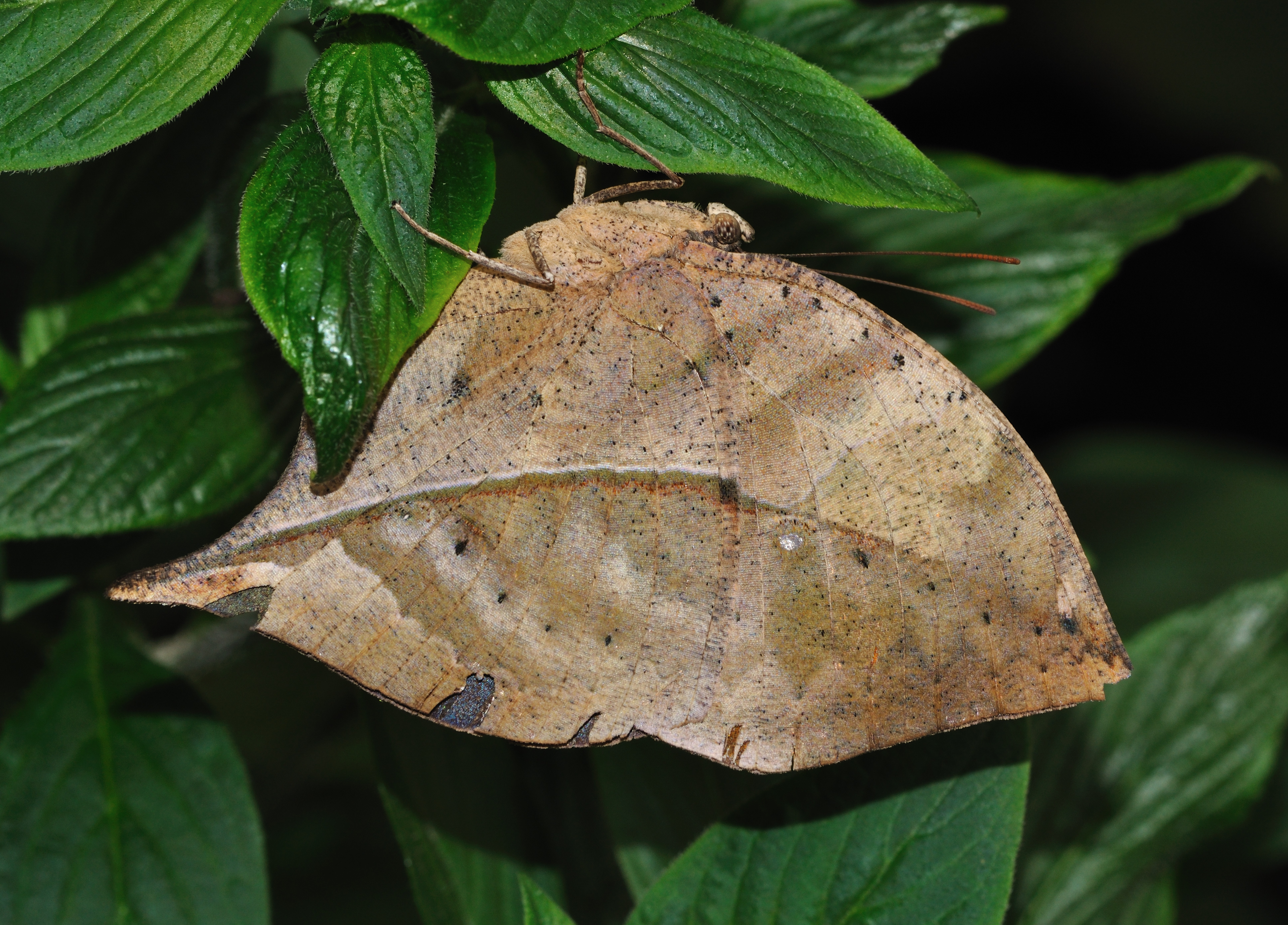
Forbes noted that the anti-Darwinian Richard Swan Lull thought the leaf butterfly Kallima inachus's camouflage "too perfect" for natural selection, sparking a long debate.

The book looks at the history of camouflage and mimicry, starting with the travels of Henry Walter Bates and Alfred Russel Wallace in the Amazon, looking at butterflies and, like Charles Darwin, reasoning about the struggle for existence implied by such a profusion of life. Bates noticed that many butterflies closely resembled each other, and proposed that some were harmless mimics of others which were distasteful: their coloration was a disguise, a deception aimed at their predators. An extreme case that Forbes celebrates is the bird-dropping spider, which wonderfully if not precisely attractively mimics bird excrement on a leaf, using its body and a film of cobweb. Fritz Müller made a further step, showing that pairs of distasteful butterfly species - or more than two - could with benefit resemble each other.

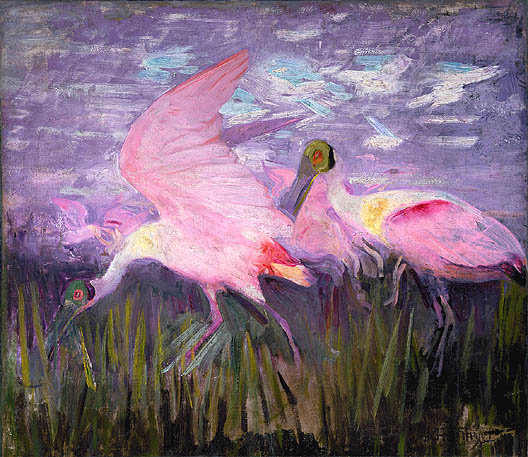
In his c. 1907 painting Roseate Spoonbills, the artist and amateur student of camouflage Abbot Thayer tried to show that even the bright pink of these conspicuous birds helped to conceal them at sunset.

Forbes describes how an American artist, Abbot Thayer, became fascinated by camouflage, proposing that all animal coloration, no matter how conspicuous, served this purpose. He described disruptive coloration and countershading in detail; his wilder claims such as for the supposed camouflage of the roseate spoonbill at sunset were roundly criticised by Teddy Roosevelt and the mid-20th-century camouflage expert, Hugh Cott. Thayer's attempts to convince the Royal Navy to adopt his camouflage ideas during the First World War were entirely unsuccessful; the zoologist John Graham Kerr did little better; but the marine artist Norman Wilkinson's ideas on dazzle camouflage were widely adopted, first for merchantmen, later for warships, in a desperate attempt to reduce shipping losses from submarine-launched torpedoes. Whether it worked is a moot point, as the experiment was uncontrolled and the paint schemes were varied continuously. Cott wrote "the only compendious zoology tract ever to be packed in a soldier's kitbag", his 1940 Adaptive Coloration in Animals. Forbes tells how the book got Cott the job of camouflage instructor to the British Eighth Army in Egypt, in a unit which created large-scale decoys including a dummy railhead and which successfully concealed a whole armoured division in the open desert in a deception operation for the battle of El Alamein. Art and nature had come together in the service of warfare.

Forbes rounds off the book by looking at the genetic basis of camouflage in butterflies, which has been studied extensively, from the early work (starting in 1954) of P. M. Sheppard and Cyril Clarke on the multiple mimicry of female Papilio dardanus of various other species of Papilio, controlled by alleles of a single gene. He describes how Miriam Rothschild took time away from her major study of fleas to investigate the toxic chemicals that underlie aposematism (warning coloration) and hence mimicry, showing that monarch butterflies contained cardenolides similar to the heart drug digoxin. She predicted that mimetic butterfly coloration would be shown to be caused by a combination of selection by bird predators and sexual selection by male butterflies, working on preadaptations involving suitable genes which enabled mimicry to develop. Around the same time, Bernard Kettlewell carried out experiments on industrial melanism in the peppered moth, showing that it was driven by bird predators. A generation later, a pioneer of evolutionary developmental biology, Sean B. Carroll, investigated the way that interacting genes such as distal-less (dll) control the development of butterfly wing patterns. This gene is active at the wing margin of butterflies, and at the centre of their conspicuous eyespots. The gene was known for its effects in the fruit fly; evidently, nature had tinkered with it to give it additional effects. More recent work by Chris Jiggins and others has started to uncover the complex genetics of the wing patterns of the mimetic Heliconius butterflies; it seems likely that they make use of an evo-devo gene toolkit which they have continually tinkered with, passing genes between species by hybridisation.

== Prizes ==
The book won the 2011 Warwick Prize for Writing.

== Reception ==
=== Military history ===
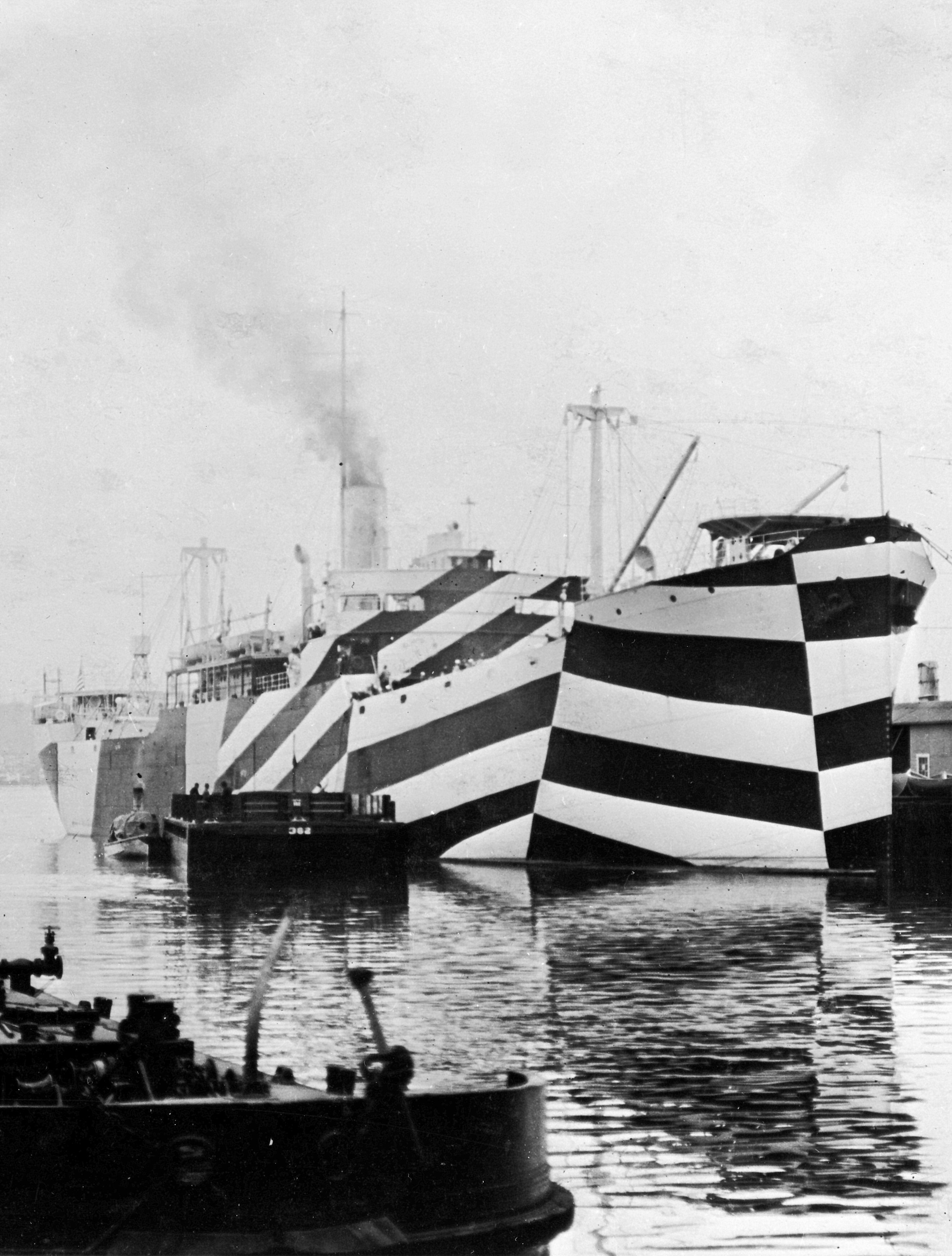
SS West Mahomet in dazzle camouflage, 1918

The military historian Tim Newark, in The Financial Times, writes that Forbes "does full justice" to the "fascinating combination" of military history, nature, and art. He notes that the book disproves the "myth of stifling military conservatism in the early 20th century." On the contrary, the Royal Navy took advice from zoologists, while the French army employed cubist artists like André Mare on the Western Front. In Newark's view, "Forbes tells brilliantly this exciting and colourful story with good anecdotes, bizarre characters and intriguing evidence.".

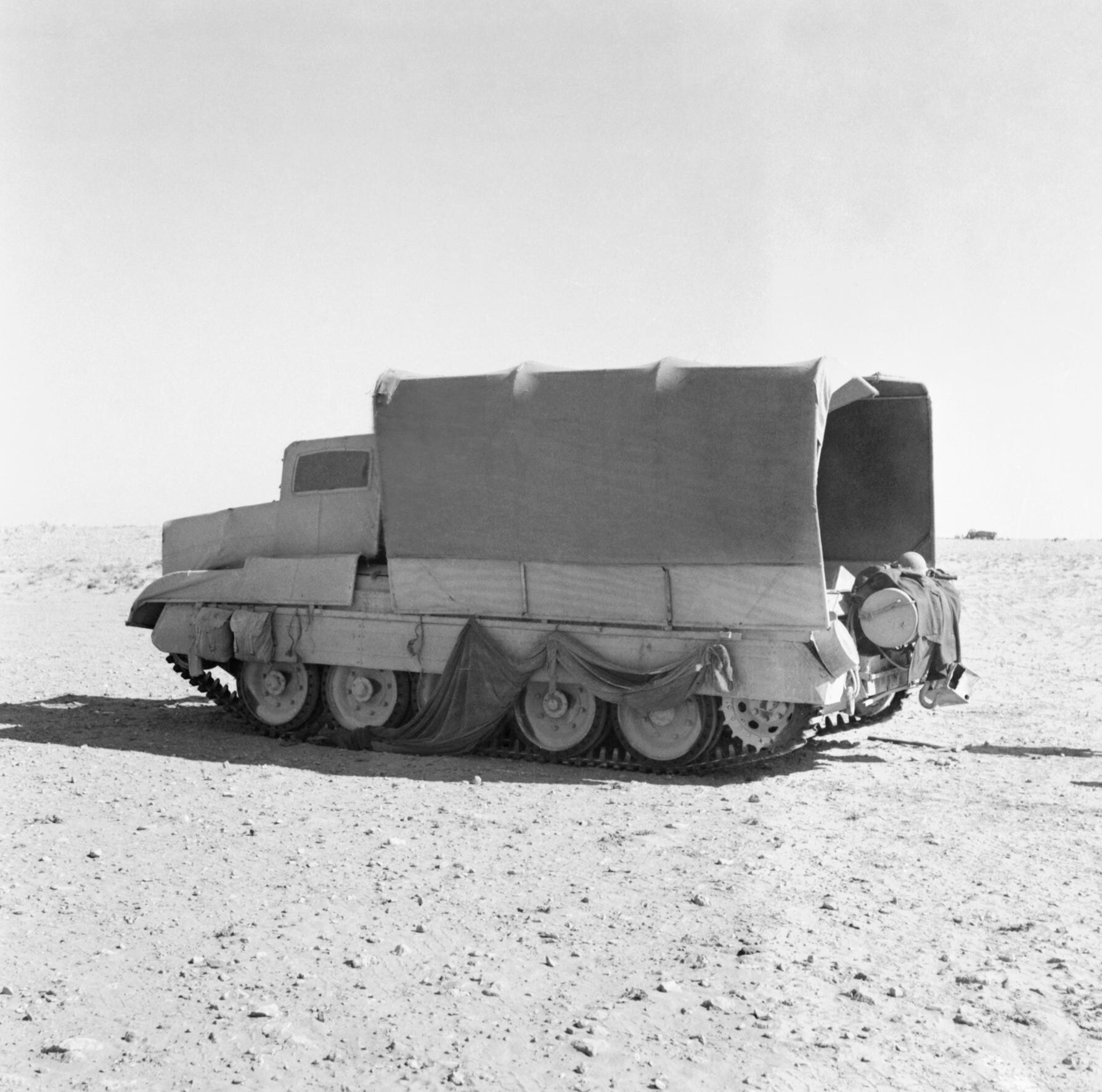
A Crusader tank in open desert, masquerading as a truck in its 'Sunshield' camouflage covers, 1942

Veronica Horwell, in The Guardian, observes that Forbes is "especially shrewd" about the British "institutional infighting that made camouflage suspect with the military." All the same, the principles identified by Hugh Bamford Cott "did become the basis for subsequent military camouflage, starting with successes improvised in the North African desert campaigns with palm fronds and jerry cans." She writes that Forbes was fascinated by nature's improvisations as much as by those of "a rum mix of biologists and artists" in the two World Wars, since he sees "with lovely clarity" that nature is a tinkerer, lacking any grand design but full of chance and "smallscale experiment".

The History of War encyclopedia website commented that their review was of possibly the only book on evolution they would ever publish, for its four useful chapters on the history of military camouflage including First World War dazzle camouflage and, flourishing in the Second World War, everything from inflatable dummy tanks to the deception preparations for El Alamein. They comment that the story of scientific research is fascinating, and that "Forbes does a very good job of explaining some very complicated theories, and has produced a classic work of popular science."

Marek Kohn, in The Independent, writes that the "traffic in ideas, from biology through art to warfare, provides Peter Forbes's Dazzled and Deceived with an intriguing and fluent narrative. It reaches its battlefield climax with the desert battle of El Alamein, where Montgomery's forces orchestrated thousands of dummy and disguised vehicles." Kohn gives as an example of the interchange the introduction by the naturalist Peter Scott of disruptive patterning to the Royal Navy.

=== Biology ===
Four female morphs of the African swallowtail Papilio dardanus, each mimicking a different distasteful species of swallowtail

The ecologist Leena Lindström, in Nature, calls Dazzled and Deceived an "excellent and wide-ranging book", praising Forbes for showing both how developments in the theory of evolution, genetics, and developmental biology influenced research on protective coloration, and in turn the influence of research on coloration on evolutionary theory.

The evolutionary biologist Edmund D. Brodie III, in BioScience, notes that the brilliantly coloured coral snakes, boldly striped in red, yellow, and black, are "among the most beautiful and breathtaking of reptiles", and argues that anyone who has seen one would agree with Hugh Cott that Abbot Thayer's claim that "such a beast is camouflaged borders on the ludicrous." Brodie notes that all the same, he found himself about to grab one during fieldwork in Costa Rica. He observes that the book does not attempt completeness on camouflage or mimicry, nor a linear history of ideas in these fields. Instead, writes Brodie, Forbes describes "some significant moments in the development of the field", both historic and modern. This allows Forbes to look into "the personalities and conflicts that led to our present dogmas, and in doing so reveals some of the biases present in our thinking." He notes that scientific ego combined with government inertia to stymie the use of science in the First World War and that Cott used "the power of data" in the form of photographs of camouflaged guns to convince the British military in the Second World War. Brodie notes that much of the book looks at the genetics and development of mimetic patterns on butterfly wings, starting with E. B. Ford's work on ecological genetics, which ultimately led to an understanding of supergenes, linked gene complexes.

Gail Vines, in New Scientist magazine, quotes Forbes's description of the archetypal camouflaged animal – not the chameleon but the octopus, a "living, breathing, swimming compendium of every camouflage and mimicry technique known." She calls the book authoritative, and the range of natural deceptions it describes "astounding, and the history of research into the phenomenon is just as surprising."

The lepidopterist Peter Eeles, in Dispar, notes that Forbes has a "dazzling cast" of characters to people his book, including "Roosevelt, Picasso, Nabokov, Churchill, and Darwin himself, to name a few." In his view, the book "sheds new light on the greatest quest: to understand the processes of life at its deepest level." He found it an easy read, engagingly told. For a lepidopterist, the highlights were the stories of Bates, Wallace, and Müller exploring the Amazon and noting the Heliconiid butterflies with their complex patterns of mimicry; and the African swallowtail Papilio dardanus with its unique range of morphs controlled by no less than 11 alleles of the engrailed.

== Sources ==
- Forbes, Peter (2009). Dazzled and Deceived: Mimicry and Camouflage. Yale University Press. ISBN 978-0-300-17896-8.
