= List of camoufleurs =

World War I and WWII camouflage specialists

The Fortnightly Fluer, the magazine for "Camou-Fluers" of Middle East Command, April 1942. Illustration by Brian Robb.

A camoufleur or camouflage officer is a person who designed and implemented military camouflage in one of the world wars of the twentieth century. The term originally meant a person serving in a First World War French military camouflage unit. In the Second World War, the British camouflage officers of the Middle East Command Camouflage Directorate, led by Geoffrey Barkas in the Western Desert, called themselves camoufleurs, and edited a humorous newsletter called The Fortnightly Fluer. Such men were often professional artists. The term is used by extension for all First and Second World War camouflage specialists. Some of these pioneered camouflage techniques. This list is restricted to such notable pioneers of military camouflage.

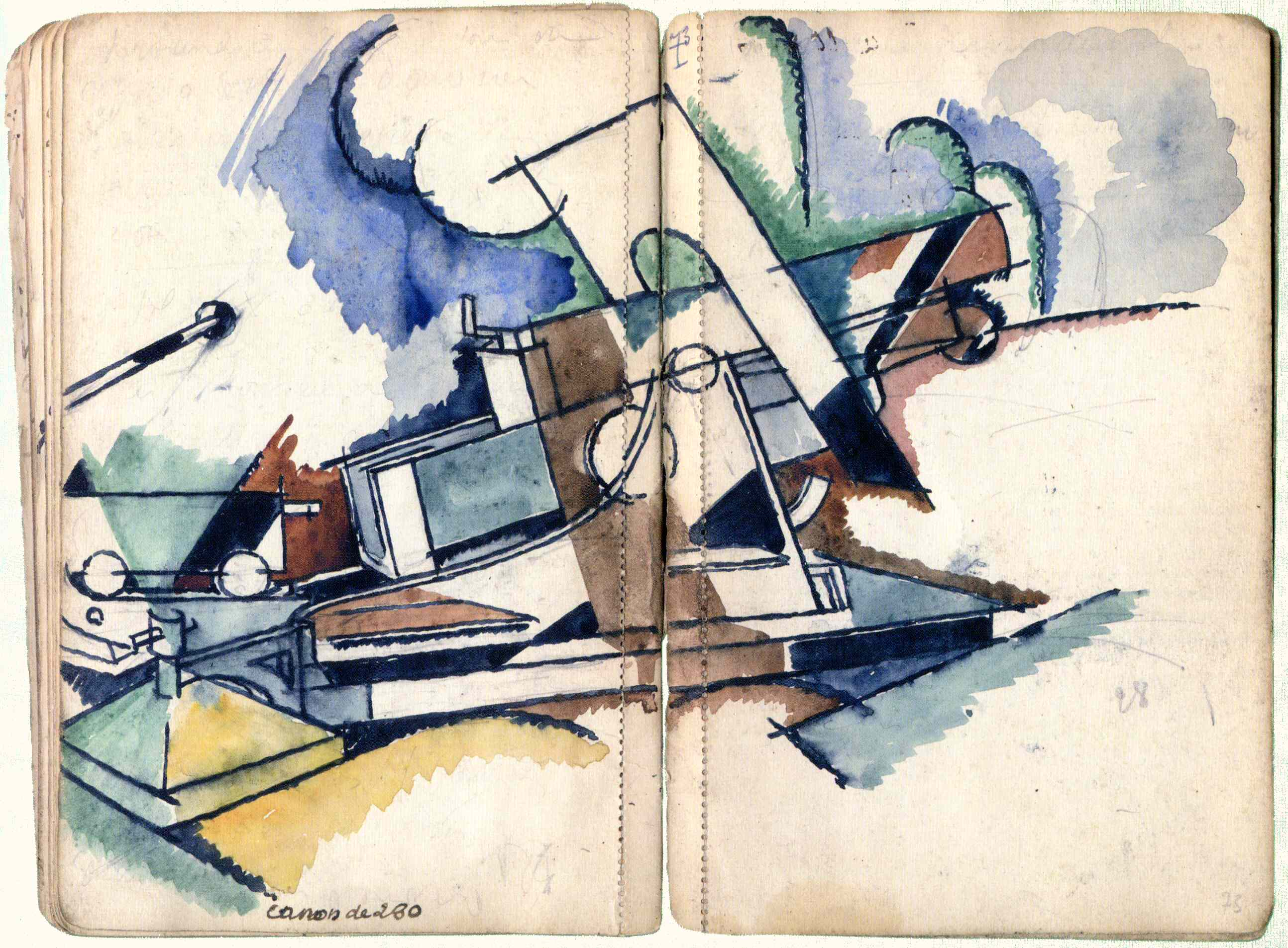
André Mare's ink and watercolour sketch Le canon de 280 camouflé (The Camouflaged 280 Gun), c.1917, shows a Cubist artist's work for the French army in the First World War.

Surrealist artist Roland Penrose wrote that he and Julian Trevelyan were both "wondering how either of us could be of any use in an occupation so completely foreign to us both as fighting a war, we decided that perhaps our knowledge of painting should find some application in camouflage." Trevelyan later admitted that their early efforts were amateurish. Working in camouflage was not a guarantee of a safe passage through the war. Lucien-Victor Guirand de Scévola's Section de Camouflage, founded in September 1914 in the French army, developed many new techniques, some of them highly dangerous, such as putting up artificial, camouflaged trees at night to replace actual trees with cramped observation posts. The Cubist painter André Mare was wounded while preparing one such observation tree. Fifteen of his camoufleur colleagues were killed during the First World War.

Some camoufleurs such as Solomon J. Solomon, aged 54 at the start of the First World War, believed that artistic skill was necessary for the design or construction of effective camouflage. He wrote that "the camoufleur is, of course, an artist, preferably one who paints or sculpts imaginative subjects. . . He must leave no clues for the detective on the other side in what he designs or executes, and he must above all things be resourceful. But his imagination and inventiveness should have free play".

Not all the camoufleurs were artists. John Graham Kerr and Hugh Cott were zoologists, though Cott was also a skilled illustrator. Both men believed passionately that effective disruptive camouflage was vital, especially in the face of aerial observation, but they had difficulty persuading authorities such as the British Air Ministry that their approach was the right one. At least one Royal Air Force officer felt that Cott's camouflage was highly effective, but, since it would demand the presence of a skilled artist for every installation, too costly to be practical.

== First World War ==
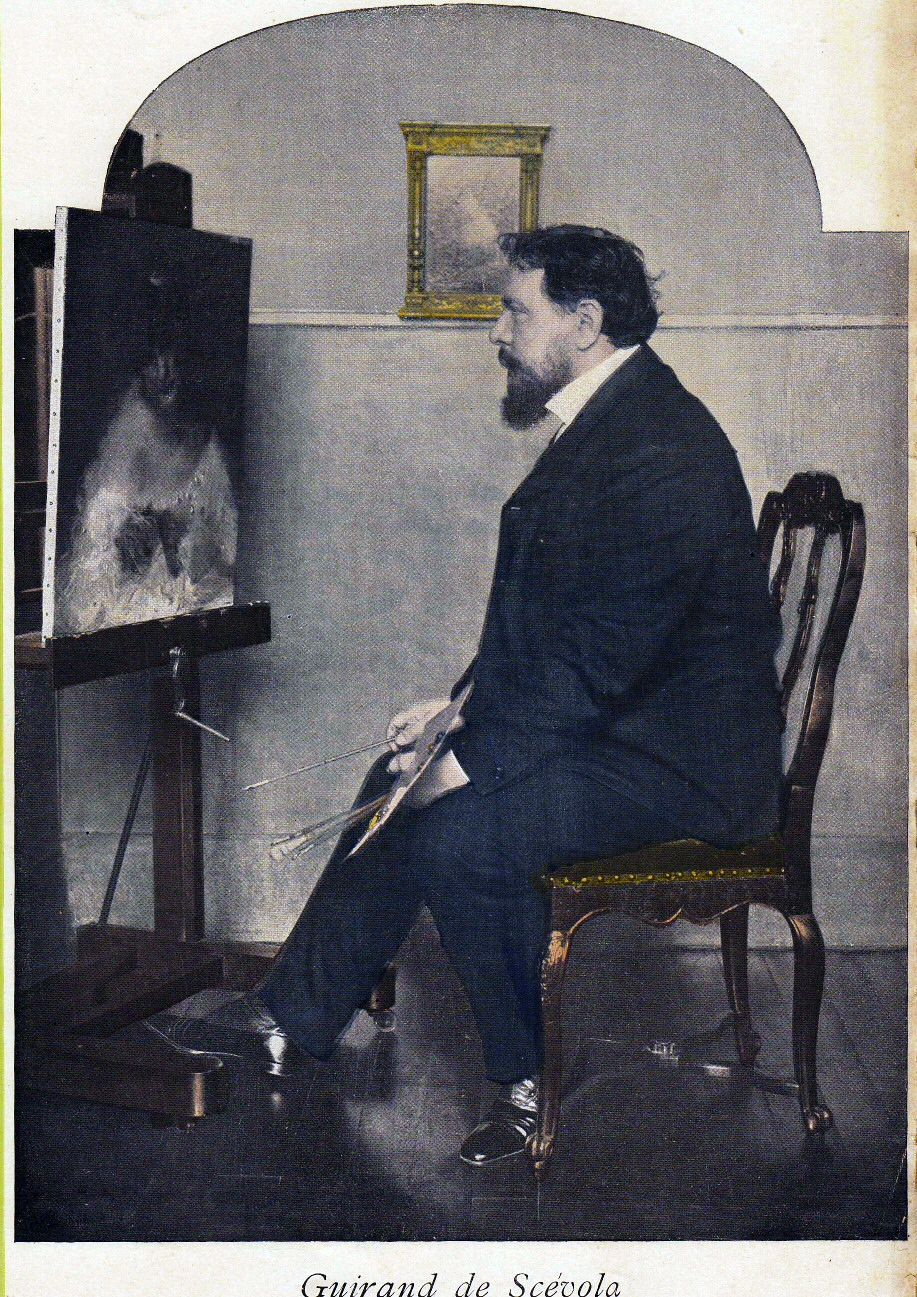
Lucien-Victor Guirand de Scévola, leader of the pioneering French First World War camouflage unit.

First World War camoufleurs
Name	Dates	Nationality	Description
Barry Faulkner	1881–1966	American	Painter of murals; organized artists for training as camouflage specialists, leading to the founding of the American Camouflage Corps in 1917.
Louis Guingot	1864–1948	French	École de Nancy painter; invented modern military camouflage in 1914, which was initially rejected by the French Army.
Lucien-Victor Guirand de Scévola	1871–1950	French	Symbolist pastel painter; leader of French Camouflage Department in First World War
Jean-Louis Forain	1852–1931	French	Impressionist painter, member of de Scévola's team
John Graham Kerr	1869–1957	Scottish	Embryologist, advocate of ship dazzle camouflage in First World War, influence on Hugh Cott (Second World War camoufleur)
Paul Klee	1879–1940	German-Swiss	Painter using expressionism, cubism and surrealism. Camouflaged aircraft during the war.
Loyd A. Jones	1884–1954	American	Leader of scientific research section of U.S. Navy camouflage unit in First World War
Franz Marc	1880–1916	German	Expressionist painter, printmaker; pioneered pointillist canvas tarpaulin camouflage
André Mare	1885–1932	French	Cubist painter, camouflaging artillery guns and observation trees
Kimon Nicolaïdes	1891–1938	American	Art teacher, served in France with the American Camouflage Corps
Solomon Joseph Solomon	1860–1927	British	Academic painter, pioneer of camouflage netting
Abbott Handerson Thayer	1849–1921	American	Painter, discoverer of countershading
Leon Underwood	1890–1975	British	Avant-garde sculptor, colleague of Solomon, made 'tree' observation posts
Edward Wadsworth	1889–1949	British	vorticist painter, designer of dazzle camouflage for ships
Everett Warner	1877–1963	American	Impressionist painter, inventor of Warner System camouflage measure for ships
Norman Wilkinson	1878–1971	British	Marine painter, pioneer of dazzle camouflage for the Royal Navy and the U.S. Navy

== Second World War ==
Geoffrey Barkas, British Army's Director of Camouflage, Middle East during Second World War.

Second World War camoufleurs
Name	Dates	Description
Tony Ayrton	1909–1943	British painter, camouflage in Western Desert: Operation Bertram died 1943.
Geoffrey Barkas	1896–1979	British film maker, Director of Camouflage, Middle East Command
Hugh Casson	1910–1999	British architect, worked on camouflage for Air Ministry 1939–1944
John Codner	1913–2008	British painter, camouflage in Western Desert
Edward Bainbridge Copnall	1903–1973	British sculptor, born in Cape Town; camouflage in Western Desert 1942
Hugh Cott	1900–1987	British zoologist, author of textbook Adaptive Coloration in Animals, government Advisory Committee on Camouflage 1939–40, advisor to British Army during Battle of Britain, Chief Instructor at Camouflage Training and Development Centre, Middle East at Helwan, Egypt
Frederick Gore	1913–2009	British fauvist painter, camouflage officer for southeast England preparing for D-Day landings
Stanley William Hayter	1901–1988	British surrealist painter, printmaker; with Roland Penrose set up camouflage training unit
Ivan Konev	1897–1973	Russian general, responsible for maskirovka including army-scale camouflage and dummy units in the Battle of Kursk, achieving tactical surprise
Jasper Maskelyne	1902–1973	British stage magician, camouflage in Western Desert 1942, exaggerating his role and effectiveness
Oliver Messel	1904–1978	English stage designer, pioneer of pillbox (concrete strongpoint) camouflage
Colin Moss	1914–2005	British social realism artist, camouflage officer at Civil Defence Camouflage Establishment (CDCE), Royal Leamington Spa, senior lecturer of figure drawing at the Ipswich Art School
Roland Penrose	1900–1984	English surrealist artist; teacher of camouflage, author of Home Guard Manual of Camouflage
Peter Proud	1913–1989	Scottish film art director, camouflage in Western Desert 1942 including Siege of Tobruk and dummy port at Ras el Hillal; invented "Net Gun Pit"; the second-in-command, to Barkas, in Middle East camouflage
Fred Pusey	1909–1983	British film art director and production designer, camouflage in Western Desert 1942 including dummy railhead at Misheifa, dummy port at Ras el Hillal and Operation Crusader
Brian Robb	1913–1979	English painter, illustrator, Punch cartoonist; camouflage in Western Desert, Operation Bertram 1942
Johann Georg Otto Schick	1882–?	German art professor, from 1935 director of the newly formed camouflage department (named "T" for "Tarnung", camouflage) where he designed a series of disruptive patterns for camouflage clothing including Platanenmuster (plane tree) and erbsenmuster (pea dot) for the Waffen-SS.
Peter Scott	1909–1989	British ornithologist, conservationist and painter of wildfowl, and naval officer exploring ship camouflage
Edward Seago	1910–1974	English Post-Impressionist painter, camouflage advisor to Field Marshal Auchinleck; invalided 1944
Alan Sorrell	1904–1974	English neo-romanticist painter and illustrator; camouflaged Royal Air Force aerodromes
Basil Spence	1907–1976	Scottish architect (Art Deco style 1933); officer in British Army's Camouflage Training and Development Centre (CDTC) at Farnham
Steven Sykes	1914–1999	British stained glass designer, ceramist and painter; first Grade 2 Camouflage Staff Officer in British army; created dummy railhead at Misheifa, Egypt in 1941, dummy port at Ras al Hilal, Cyrenaica in 1942.
Ernest Townsend	1880–1944	British portrait painter; camouflaged roofs of Rolls-Royce aircraft engine factories in Derby as houses
Julian Trevelyan	1910–1988	British printmaker and teacher; pioneer of desert camouflage and deception

== Post-war ==
Post-war camoufleurs
Name	Dates	Description
Timothy O'Neill	1943–2023	American designer of digital camouflage pattern MARPAT.

== Bibliography ==
- Barkas, Geoffrey; Barkas, Natalie (1952). The Camouflage Story (from Aintree to Alamein). Cassell.
- Crowdy, Terry (2008). Deceiving Hitler: Double Cross and Deception in World War II. Osprey. ISBN 978-1-84603-135-9.
- Forbes, Peter (2009). Dazzled and Deceived: Mimicry and Camouflage. Yale. pp. 155–156. ISBN 978-0-300-12539-9.
- Forsyth, Isla McLean (2012). From dazzle to the desert: a cultural-historical geography of camouflage (PDF). PhD thesis, University of Glasgow.
- Glantz, David (1989). Military Deception in the Second World War. Cass Series on Soviet Military Theory & Practice. Routledge. ISBN 978-0-71463-347-3.
- Goodden, Henrietta (2007). Camouflage and Art: Design for Deception in World War 2. Unicorn Press. ISBN 978-0-90629-087-3.
- Newark, Tim (2007). Camouflage. Thames & Hudson. ISBN 978-0-500-51347-7.
- Partsch, Susanna (2007). Klee (in German). Cologne: Benedikt Taschen. p. 35. ISBN 978-3-8228-6361-9.
- Peterson, D. (2001). Waffen-SS Camouflage Uniforms and Post-war Derivatives. Crowood. p. 64. ISBN 978-1-86126-474-9.
- Rankin, Nicholas (2008). Churchill's Wizards: The British Genius for Deception 1914–1945. Faber. ISBN 978-0-571-22195-0.
- Stroud, Rick (2012). The Phantom Army of Alamein: How the Camouflage Unit and Operation Bertram Hoodwinked Rommel. Bloomsbury. ISBN 978-1-4088-2910-3.
- Sykes, Steven (1990). Deceivers Ever: The Memoirs of a Camouflage Officer. Spellmount. ISBN 0-946771-54-5.
