= Multi-scale camouflage =

Type of camouflage that combines patterns

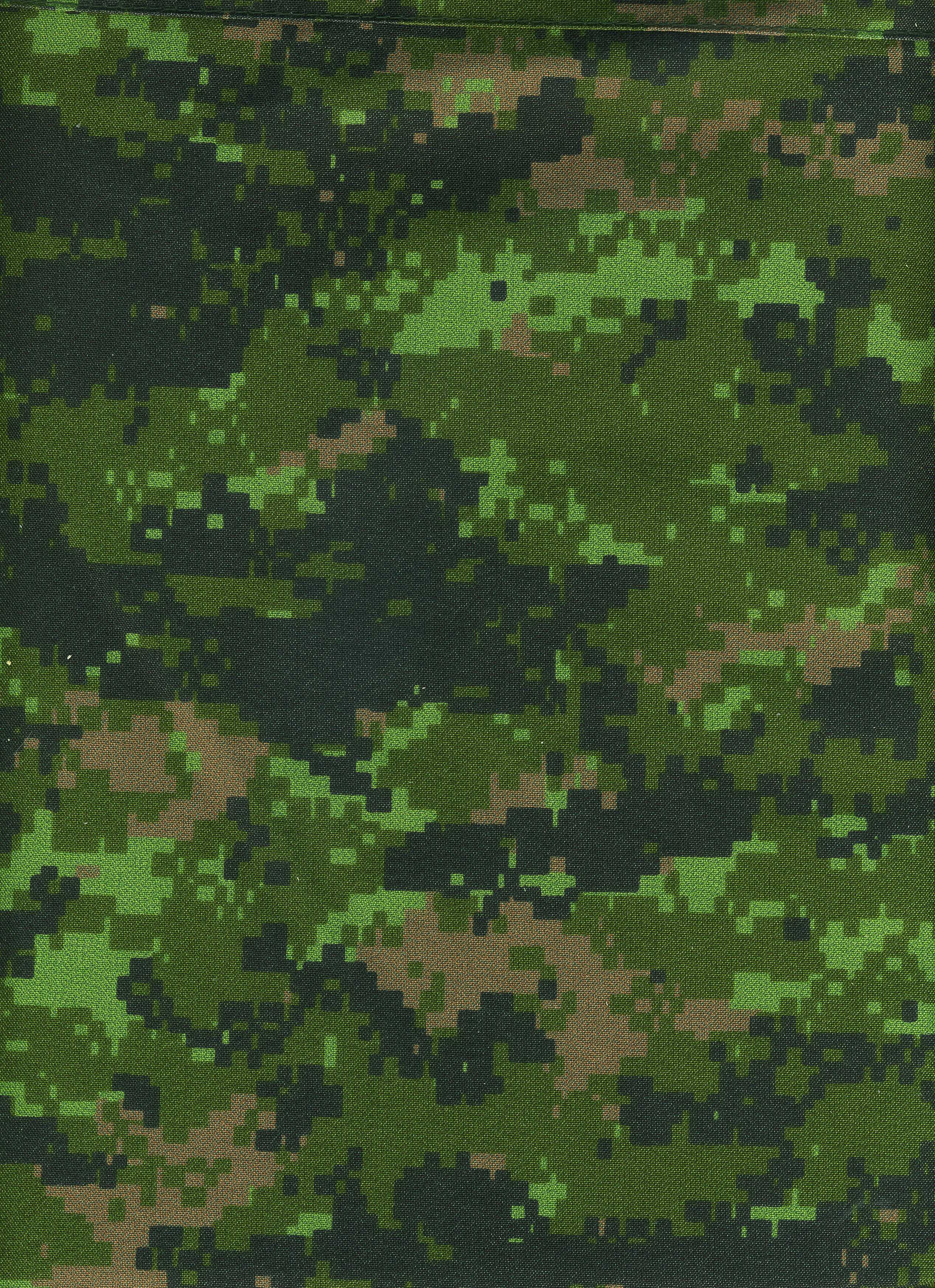
The Canadian Forces were the first army to issue pixellated digital multi-scale camouflage for all units with their disruptively patterned CADPAT, issued in 2002, shown here in its 'Temperate Woodland' variant.

Multi-scale camouflage is a type of military camouflage that combines patterns over at least two scales. The pattern is often created digitally. The function is to provide camouflage over a range of distances, or equivalently over a range of scales (scale-invariant camouflage), in the manner of fractals, so some approaches are called fractal camouflage. Not all multiscale patterns are composed of rectangular pixels, even if they were designed using a computer. Further, not all pixellated patterns work at different scales, so being pixellated or digital does not of itself guarantee improved performance.

The first standardized pattern to be issued was the single-scale Italian telo mimetico. The root of the modern multi-scale camouflage patterns can be traced back to 1930s experiments in Europe for the German and Soviet armies. This was followed by the Canadian development of the Canadian Disruptive Pattern (CADPAT), first issued in 2002, and then with US work which created the Marine pattern (MARPAT), launched between 2002 and 2004.

== Principle ==
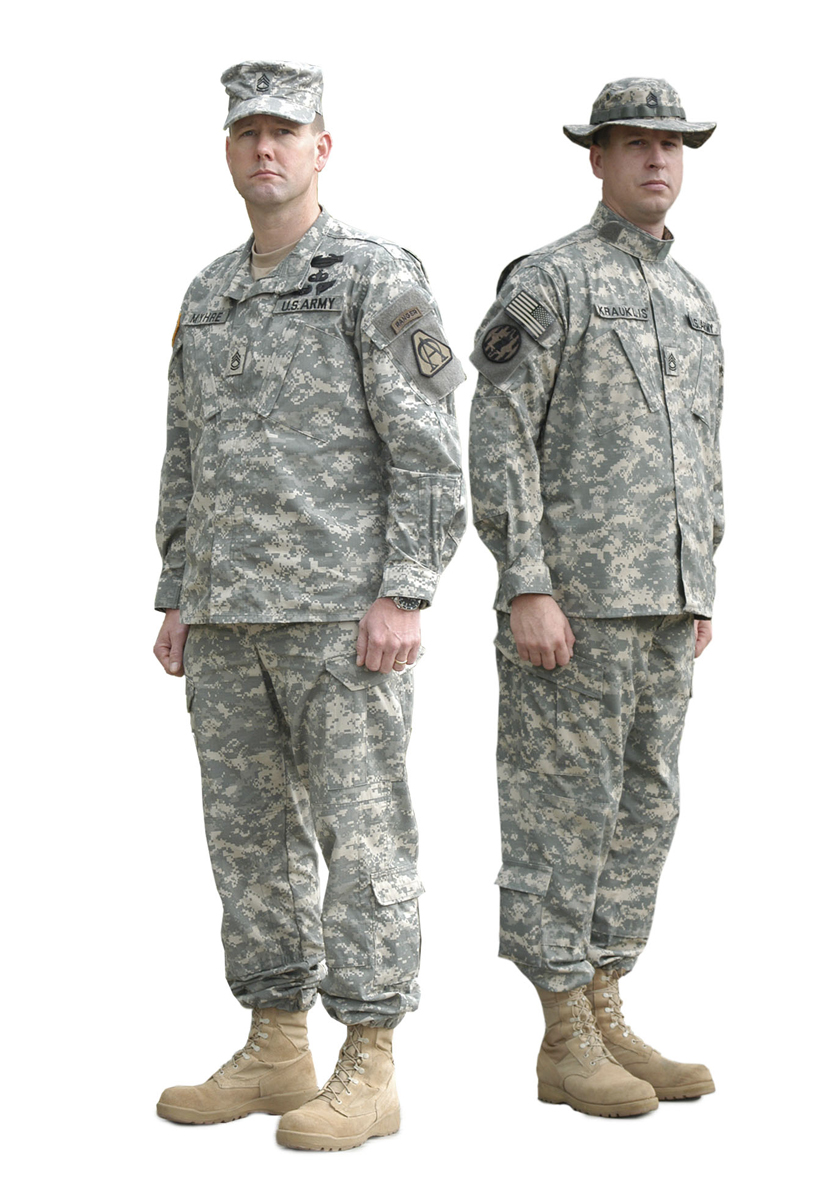
The Universal Camouflage Pattern provided insufficient contrast to disrupt a soldier's outline effectively, appearing at a moderate distance as a single colour.

=== Scale invariance ===
The scale of camouflage patterns is related to their function. Large structures need larger patterns than individual soldiers to disrupt their shape. At the same time, large patterns are more effective from afar, while small scale patterns work better up close. Traditional single scale patterns work well in their optimal range from the observer, but an observer at other distances will not see the pattern optimally. Nature itself is very often fractal, where plants and rock formations exhibit similar patterns across several magnitudes of scale. The idea behind multi-scale patterns is both to mimic the self-similarity of nature, and also to offer scale invariant or so-called fractal camouflage.

Animals such as the flounder have the ability to adapt their camouflage patterns to suit the background, and they do so extremely effectively, selecting patterns that match the spatial scales of the current background.

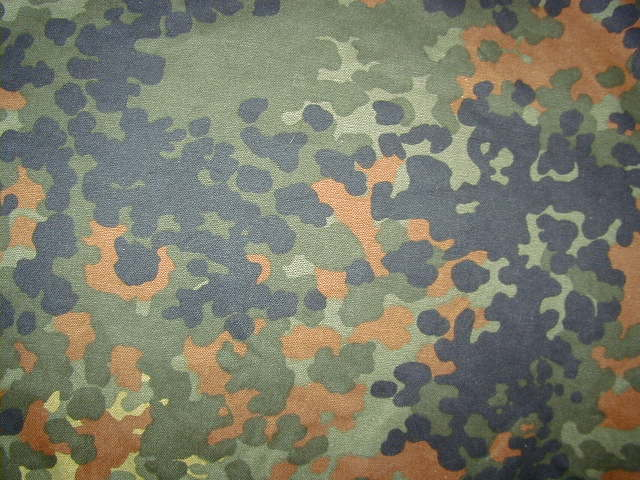
Modern German Flecktarn 1990, developed from a 1938 pattern, is a non-digital pattern which works at different distances.

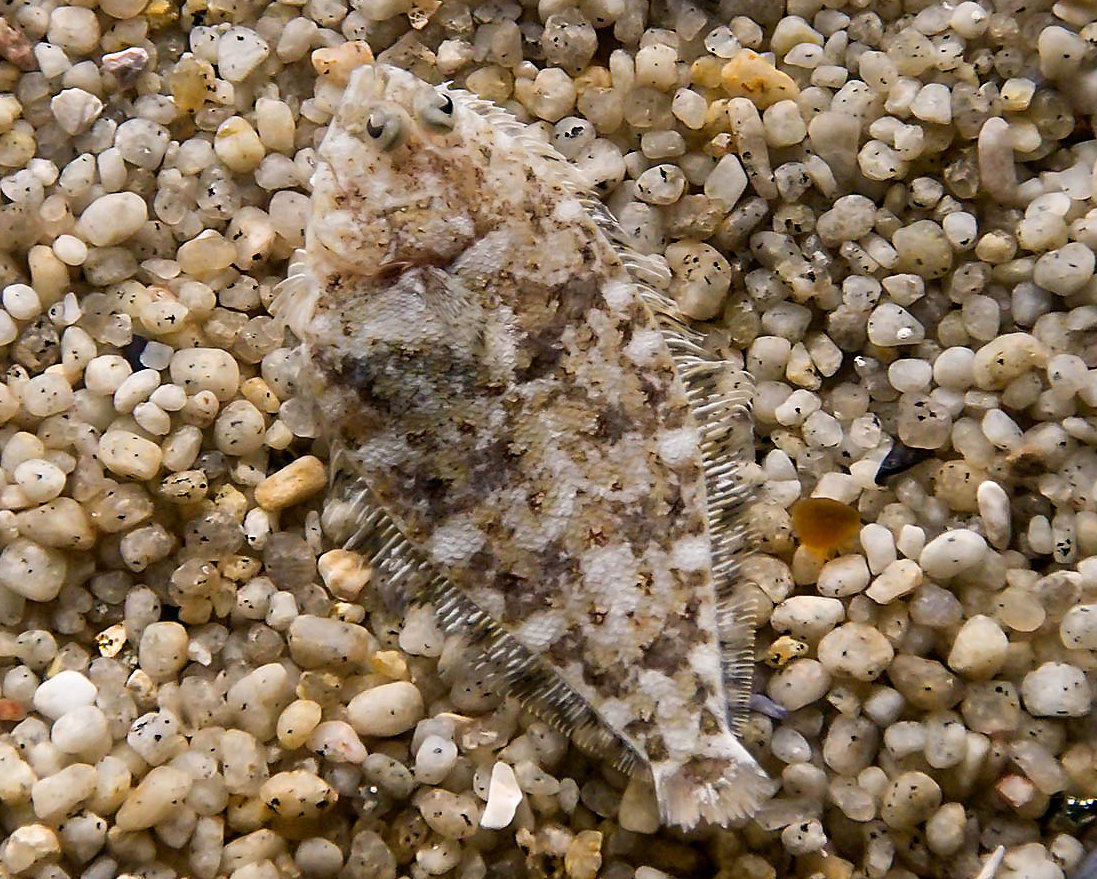
A flounder's disruptive and active camouflage

=== Design trade-offs ===
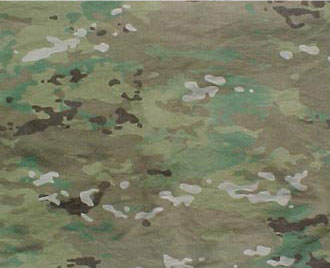
Operational Camouflage Pattern, a disruptive but non-pixellated pattern, replaced the Universal Camouflage Pattern beginning in 2015.

A pattern being called digital most often means that it is visibly composed of computer-generated pixels. The term is sometimes also used of computer generated patterns like the non-pixellated MultiCam and the Italian fractal Vegetato pattern. Neither pixellation nor digitization contributes to the camouflaging effect. The pixellated style, however, simplifies design and eases printing on fabric, compared to traditional patterns. While digital patterns are becoming widespread, critics maintain that the pixellated look is a question of fashion rather than function.

The design process involves trading-off different factors, including colour, contrast, and overall disruptive effect. A failure to consider all elements of pattern design tends to result in poor results. The US Army's Universal Camouflage Pattern (UCP), for example, adopted after limited testing in 2003 and 2004, performed poorly because of low pattern contrast (isoluminance—beyond very close range, the design looks like a field of solid light grey, failing to disrupt an object's outlines) and arbitrary colour selection, neither of which could be saved by quantizing (digitizing) the pattern geometry. The design was replaced from 2015 with the Operational Camouflage Pattern, a non-pixellated pattern.

== History ==
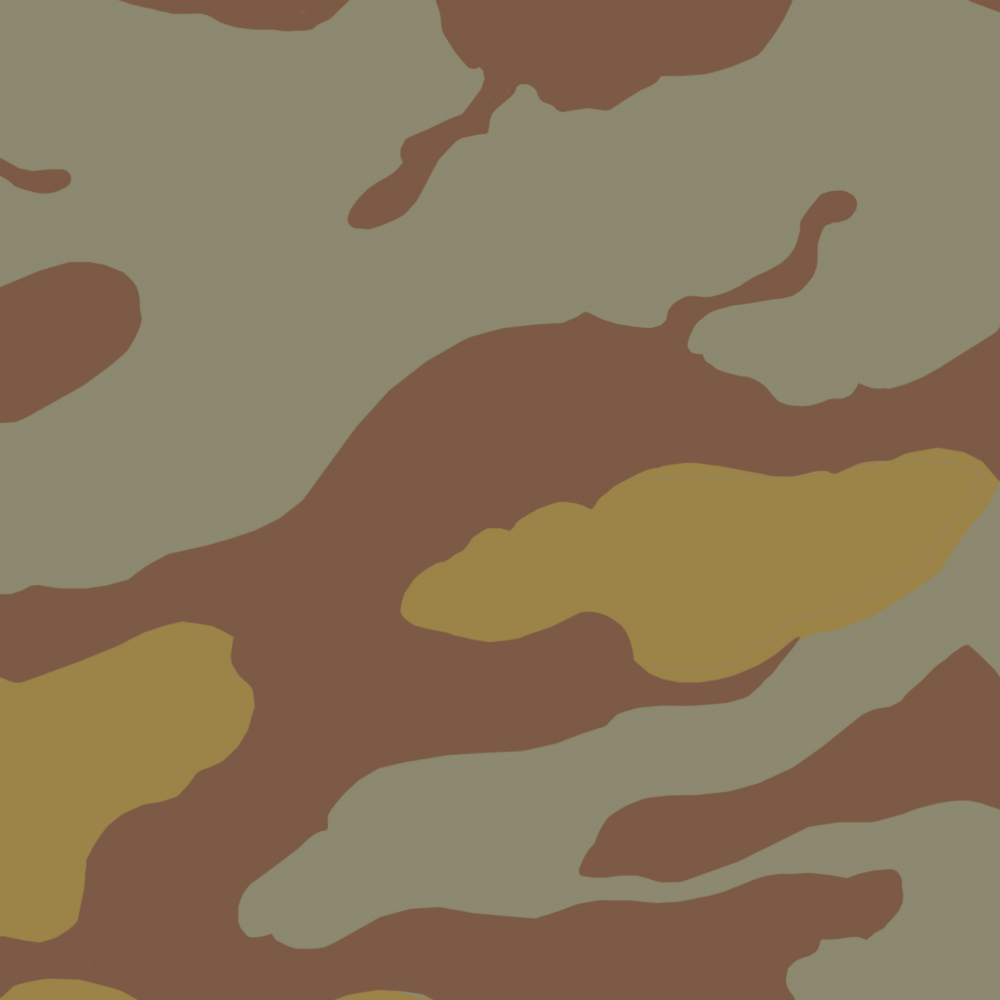
Italian Telo mimetico, first used in 1929

=== Interwar development in Europe ===
The idea of patterned camouflage extends back to the interwar period in Europe. The first printed camouflage pattern was the 1929 Italian telo mimetico, which used irregular areas of three colours at a single scale.

=== German WWII experiments ===
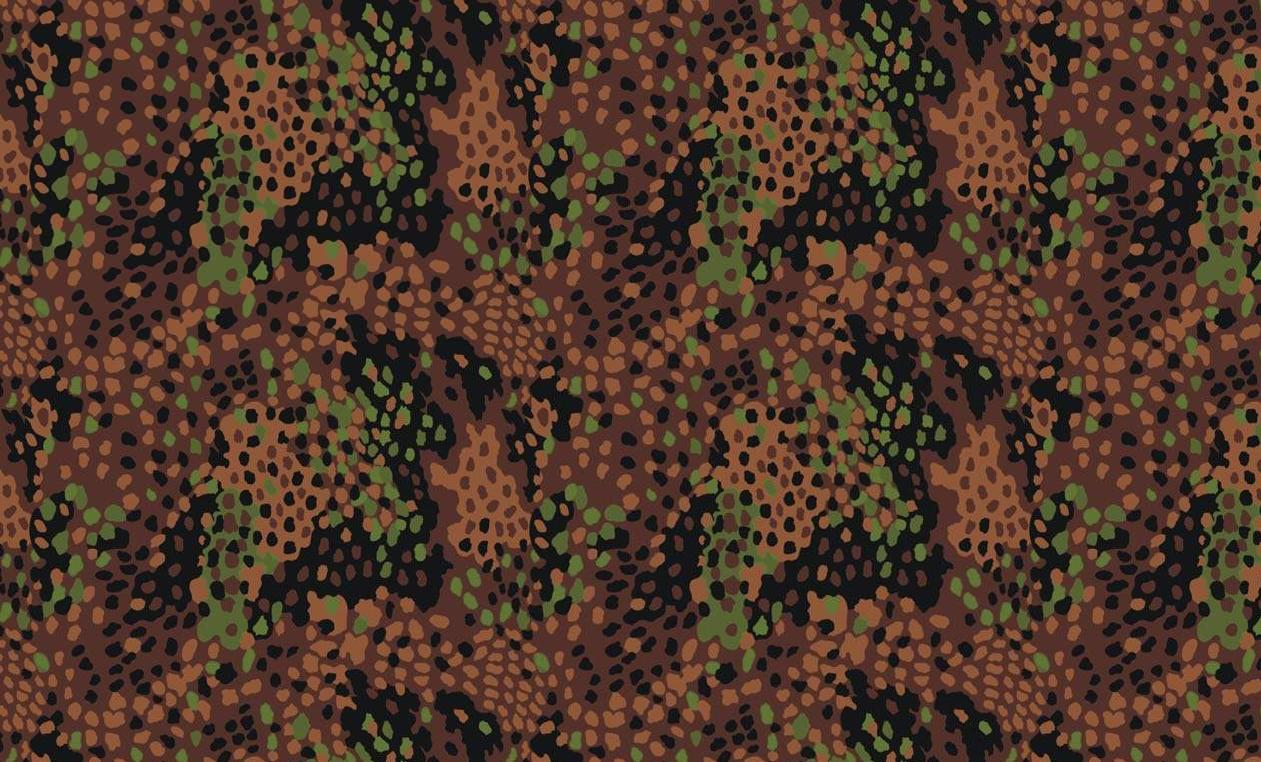
Waffen-SS 1944 Erbsenmuster (pea-dot pattern) combines large and small scale patterns.

During the Second World War, Johann Georg Otto Schick (Note: Schick (1882–?) was a professor in Munich in the 1930s, and from 1935 director of the newly formed camouflage department (named "T" for "Tarnung", camouflage).) designed a series of patterns such as Platanenmuster (plane tree pattern) and Erbsenmuster (pea-dot pattern) for the Waffen-SS, combining micro- and macro-patterns in one scheme.

=== Soviet WWII experiments ===
Pixel-like shapes pre-date computer-aided design by many years, already being used in Soviet Union experiments with camouflage patterns, such as "TTsMKK" (Note: TTsMKK (Russian: ТЦМКК) is short for "three-colour disguise camouflage suit" ("трёхцветный маскировочный камуфлированный костюм", tryokhtsvetniy maskirovochniy kamuflirovanniy kostyum).) developed in 1944 or 1945. The pattern uses areas of olive green, sand, and black running together in broken patches at a range of scales.

=== 1976 research by Timothy O'Neill ===
In 1976, Timothy O'Neill created a pixellated pattern named "Dual-Tex". He called the digital approach "texture match". The initial work was done by hand on a retired M113 armoured personnel carrier; O'Neill painted the pattern on with a 2-inch (5.1 cm) roller, forming squares of colour by hand. Field testing showed that the result was good compared to the U. S. Army's existing camouflage patterns, and O'Neill went on to become an instructor and camouflage researcher at West Point military academy.

=== 2000s fractal-like digital patterns ===
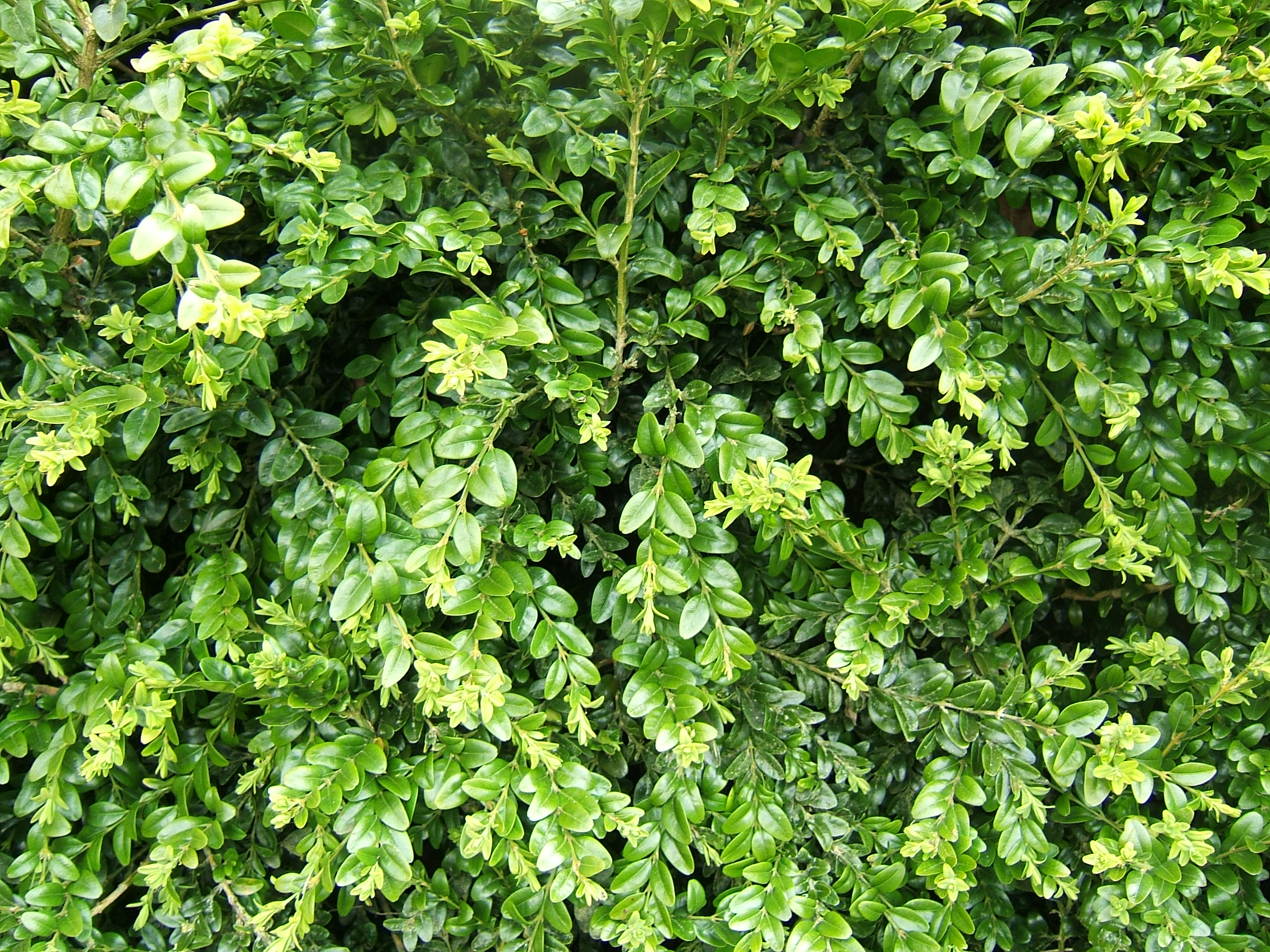
Patterns in nature, like the foliage of this Buxus sempervirens bush, are often broken into visual elements with small and large scales, such as branches and leaves.

By 2000, development was underway to create pixellated camouflage patterns for combat uniforms like the Canadian Forces' CADPAT, which was developed in 1997 and later issued in 2002, and then the US Marines' MARPAT, rolled out between 2002 and 2004. The CADPAT and MARPAT patterns were somewhat self-similar (in the manner of fractals and patterns in nature such as vegetation), designed to work at two different scales. A genuinely fractal pattern would be statistically similar at all scales. A target camouflaged with MARPAT takes about 2.5 times longer to detect than older NATO camouflage which worked at only one scale, while recognition, which begins after detection, took 20 percent longer than with older camouflage.

Fractal-like patterns work because the human visual system efficiently discriminates images that have different fractal dimension or other second-order statistics like Fourier spatial amplitude spectra; objects simply appear to pop out from the background. Timothy O'Neill helped the Marine Corps to develop first a digital pattern for vehicles, then fabric for uniforms, which had two colour schemes, one designed for woodland, one for desert.
