= Sumpftarnmuster =

Camouflage Article

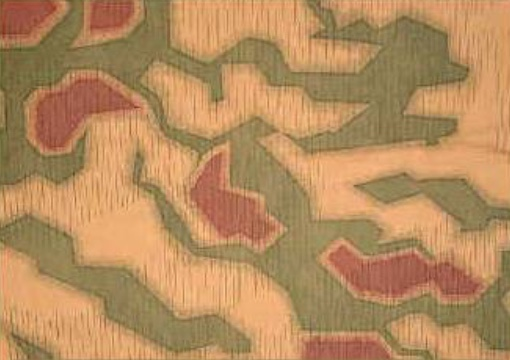
Sumpftarnmuster 43 pattern.

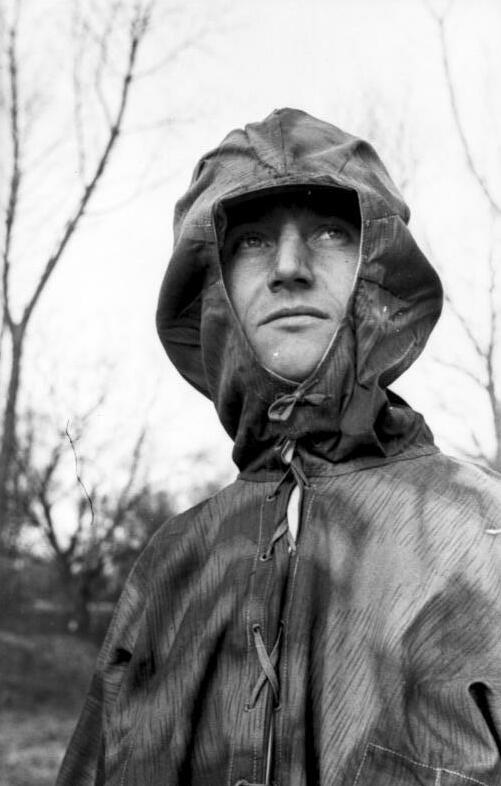
Wehrmacht soldier wearing a Sumpftarnmuster smock on the eastern front.

The Sumpftarnmuster or Marsh Camouflage was one of a family of German World War II camouflage patterns, derived from the earlier 1931 Reichswehr design, Splittertarnmuster or more commonly referred to as Splinter Camouflage. The pattern was first issued to Wehrmacht units in 1943 in the form of smocks, helmet covers, and winter overpants. The pattern resembles a saturated version of the Splinter Camouflage with the color dominance switching from beige, to green to better blend into forest environments.

== Development ==
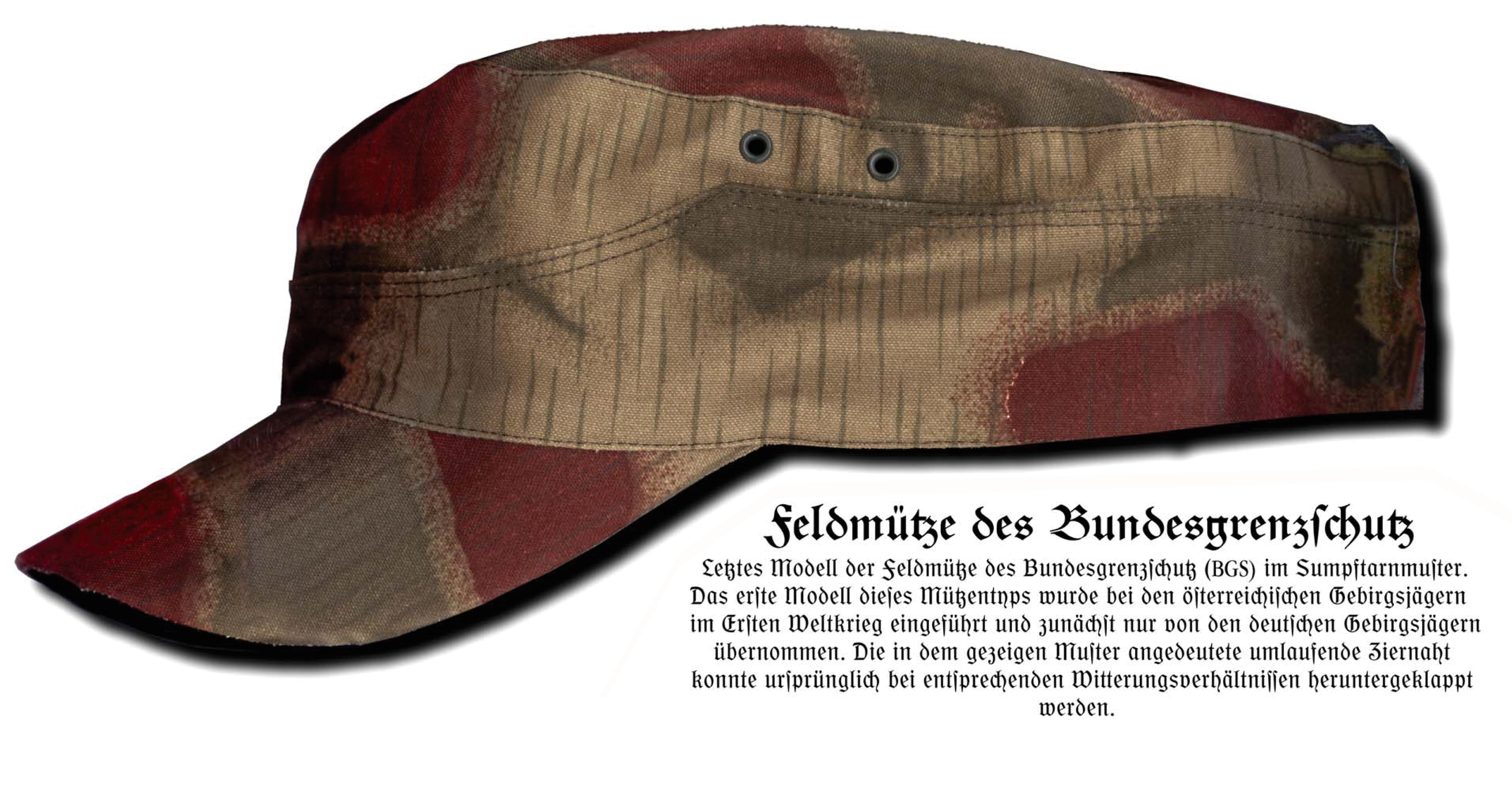
Field cap of the Federal Border Guard with camouflage pattern

Sumpftarnmuster was developed from the earlier splinter camouflage. The smocks and overpants reversed to white, for the abundance of snowy areas in the Soviet Union during the winter.

The two piece uniform was meant to be worn over the common issue wool or Drillich uniforms. The pattern was intended to be effective throughout the year.

== Users ==
=== Former ===
- Nazi Germany: Developed in 1943 and used from there on out on both fronts but mainly saw action on the eastern front.
- West Germany: Used modified version in the early 1950's by the border guard (Bundesgrenzschutz).

== Literature ==
- Daniel Peterson: Tarnuniformen der Wehrmacht und Nachkriegsvarianten. Enforcer Pülz, Ubstadt-Weiher 2006, ISBN 978-3-939700-31-9
- Hans-Jürgen Schmidt: „Wir tragen den Adler des Bundes am Rock …“ Chronik des Bundesgrenzschutzes 1951–1971. Fiedler-Verlag, Coburg 1993, ISBN 978-3-923434-17-6
- Hans-Jürgen Schmidt: „Wir tragen den Adler des Bundes am Rock …“ Chronik des Bundesgrenzschutzes 1972–1992. Fiedler-Verlag, Coburg 1994, ISBN 978-3-923434-21-3
- Nigel Thomas, Stephen Andrew: The German Army 1939–45. Band 5: Western Front 1943–45. Reprinted Edition. Osprey Publishing Limited, London 2003, ISBN 978-1-85532-797-9 (Men-at-arms Series 336).
