= Splittertarnmuster =

Military camouflage pattern

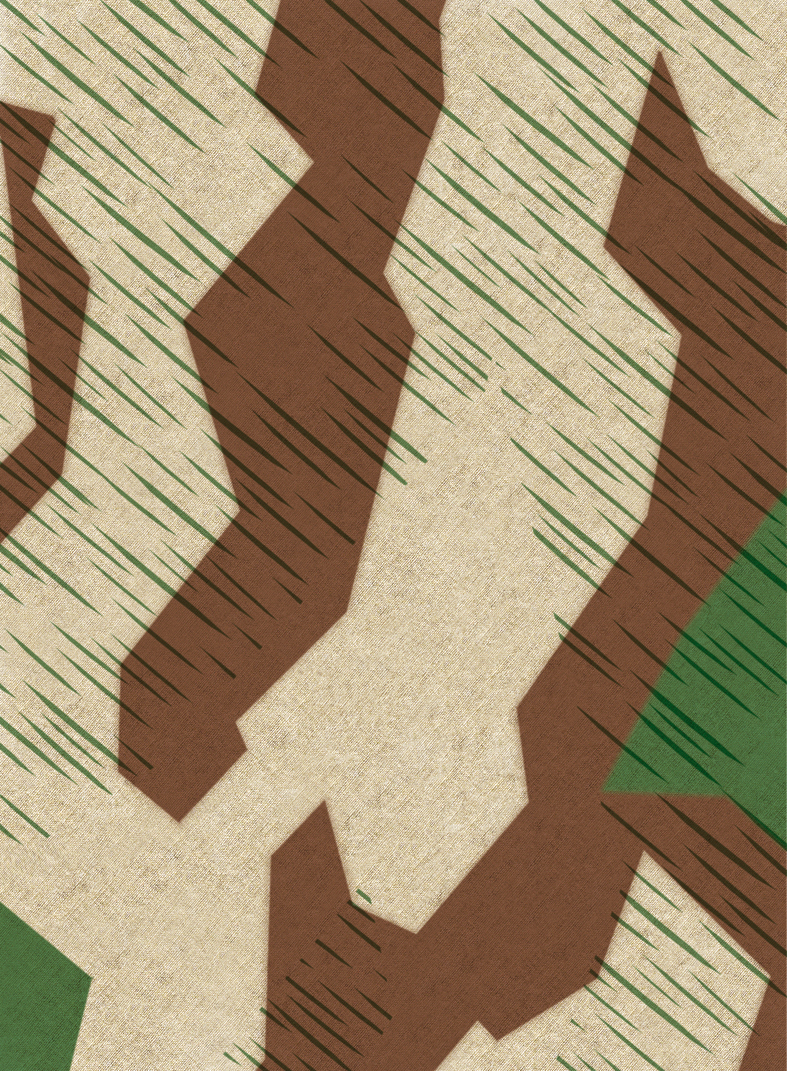
Splittertarn 31 pattern.

Splittertarnmuster, Splittertarn or Splittermuster (English: splinter-pattern) is a four-colour military camouflage pattern developed by Germany in the late 1920s, first issued to the Reichswehr in 1931. The pattern consists of a disruptive pattern of hard-edged polygons, with sharp corners between coloured patches. A random pattern of dashes was applied in places to improve the camouflage effect.

== Development ==
Splittertarnmuster was first printed on the newly designed and issued triangular tent/poncho called the dreiecks zeltbahn (triangle tarpaulin), just as the Italian 1929 telo mimetico began as a tent pattern. Known in German as Buntfarbenaufdruck 31 (colourful print 31), for its year of introduction, splittertarn was later issued to practically all regular military (Wehrmacht) units. (Note: Whereas the Waffen-SS used their own patterns.) The pattern consists of a disruptive, zig-zag pattern of hard-edged wood-brown and medium green polygons printed on a light field-grey or tan background. A random pattern of green dashes, called raindrops, was applied in places to improve the camouflage effect.

Proposed in 1931 and introduced in 1932, the four-colour camouflage patterns incorporated "splinters" on top of the 1918 colour pattern. The pattern included ochre, rust and brown overlaid on a green foundation, with sharp corners between coloured patches. This new pattern was printed on zeltbahn (triangular tent) material and could also be used as a camouflage rain poncho in the field. Both sides of the material showed the same pattern but the printing was brighter on one side.

A subdued grey-beige tint replaced the yellow-ochre colour. On top of this background, green and brown irregular patterns were screen-printed. A final innovation applied to this camouflage colour printing were the "splinters" irregularly printed on the fabric. Directional, dark-green dashed lines ("grass" or "rain") were printed in selected areas to help break up the silhouette. Many similar rain pattern designs inspired by splittermuster were made after the war by Warsaw Pact countries. During the war, cost-saving measures required textiles to be printed with changed colours and many of the lower-cost two-colour options were abandoned. These cost-saving measures caused significant deviations from the original colour patterns. In 1941 splitter pattern jump smocks were issued to German paratroops for the invasion of Crete.

== Heeres-Splittermuster 31 ==
In 1942, a Tarnhemd (smock) and Tarnhelmüberzug (helmet cover), both of a lightweight herringbone twill linen, were issued. Only one side of each was printed in splitter pattern; the other side was left white for snow camouflage.

In April 1942, a Wintertarnanzug suit consisted of a padded jacket, trousers, separate hood and mittens. These were also printed only on one side and were left white on the other side. Only a small amount of this was produced; a similar set made in mouse grey or field grey were more common.

Many unofficial garments and helmet covers were produced as field expedients or were tailor-made, mostly from zeltbahn material. These included versions of the service dress uniform, parachute-jump smocks, field jackets, rucksacks and panzer jackets. Later materials included rayon.

== Luftwaffen-Splittermuster 41 ==
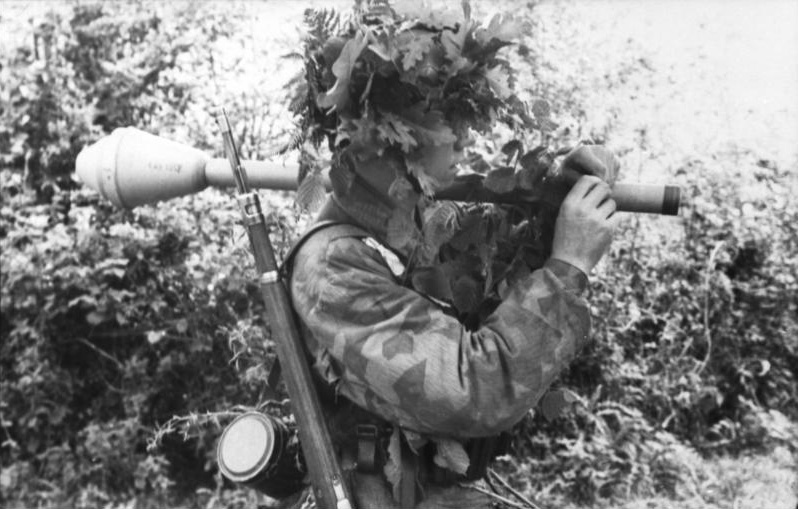
Fallschirmjäger wearing Splittermuster41

Luftwaffen-Splittermuster 41 (also: Buntfarbenaufdruck) is a Luftwaffe version with a smaller splinter and a more-complicated pattern, from probably not earlier than 1941. The Luftwaffe's variant of splittermuster 31 is known in the literature as "splinter camouflage B". The pattern was used for the Fallschirmjäger's parachute Knochensack jump smock and Luftwaffe Field Division field jacket to be manufactured. Other material produced with this equipment included camouflage helmet covers, ammunition bandoliers and grenade bags. The production of the splinter camouflage B ended in 1944.

== Foreign variants ==
=== Bulgaria ===
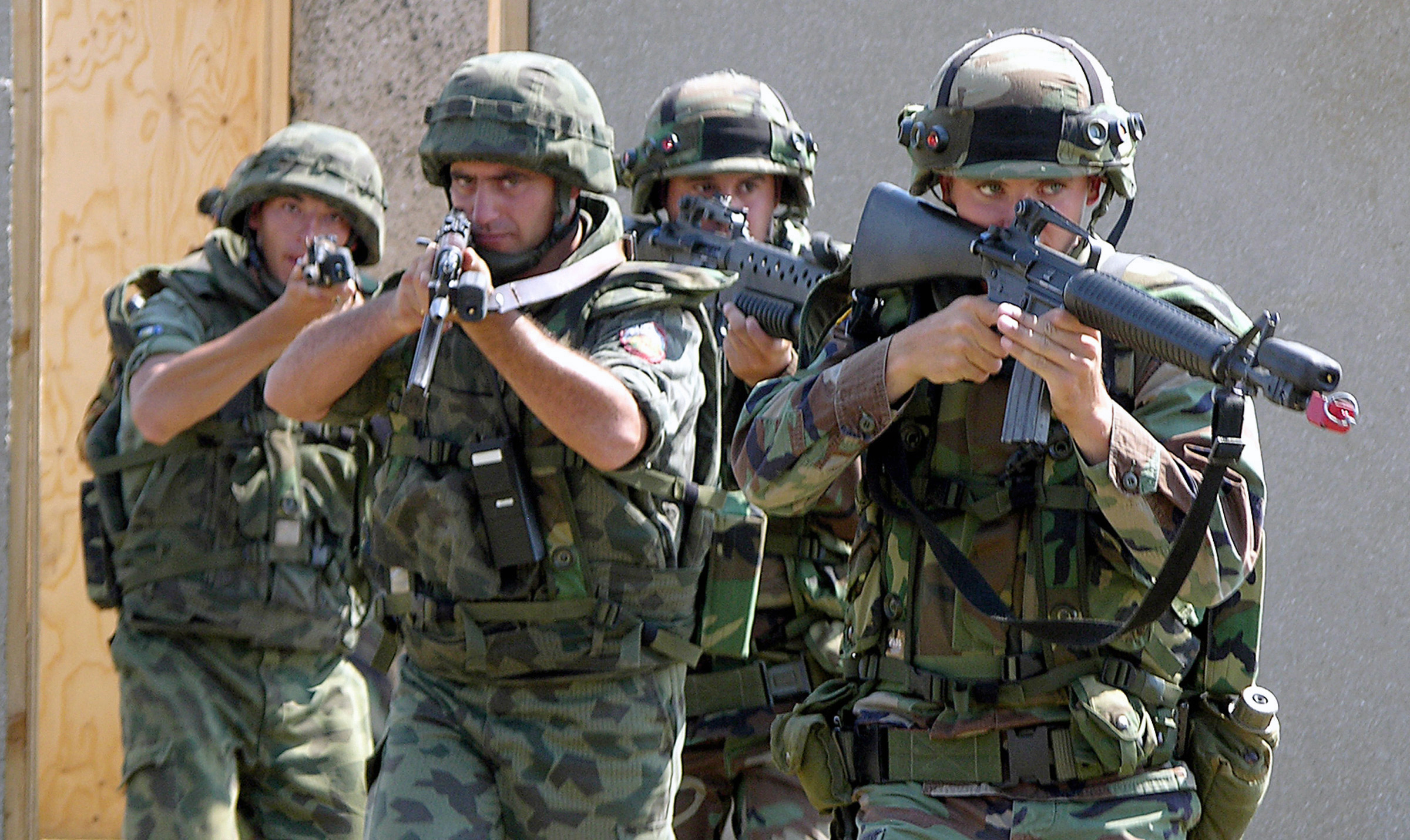
Bulgarian splittertarnmuster (two soldiers on left)

During World War II, Bulgarian paratroopers were equipped with Luftwaffe-Splittermuster 41. Its typical square look with the dashed lines has been the national camouflage of Bulgaria and has continually evolved. It was worn as a one-piece boilersuit and as a two-piece suit for paratroops, border troops and mountain troops. The mountain version had large patches of reinforcing materials on the knees, elbows, wrists and shoulders and black patches under the arms, around the collar and in the crotch. A Soviet-style large beret, pulled down to the left, was worn.

For the paratroopers in 1953, a three-colour pattern was introduced, which had been derived directly from the bright colours printed in 1941 for the German paratroopers. The dashed lines here were not aligned uniformly in one direction but could vary within a limited framework. The colours were based on the model but used other tones. The Bulgarian splinter 53 was later issued to special forces and worn until 1991.

The Bulgarian Splittertarnmuster was developed in the 1960s and 1970s, with varied shapes and colors. In 1979, the army released another version of the Bulgarian paratroopers colored imprint of 1941, with wavy dotted lines, which was again closer to the German model. In 1991, the production of the pattern was started. In 1997, the current three-color printing for bright colors was launched for the entire Bulgarian army, with the dashed lines appearing again in a spidery waveform.

=== Sweden ===
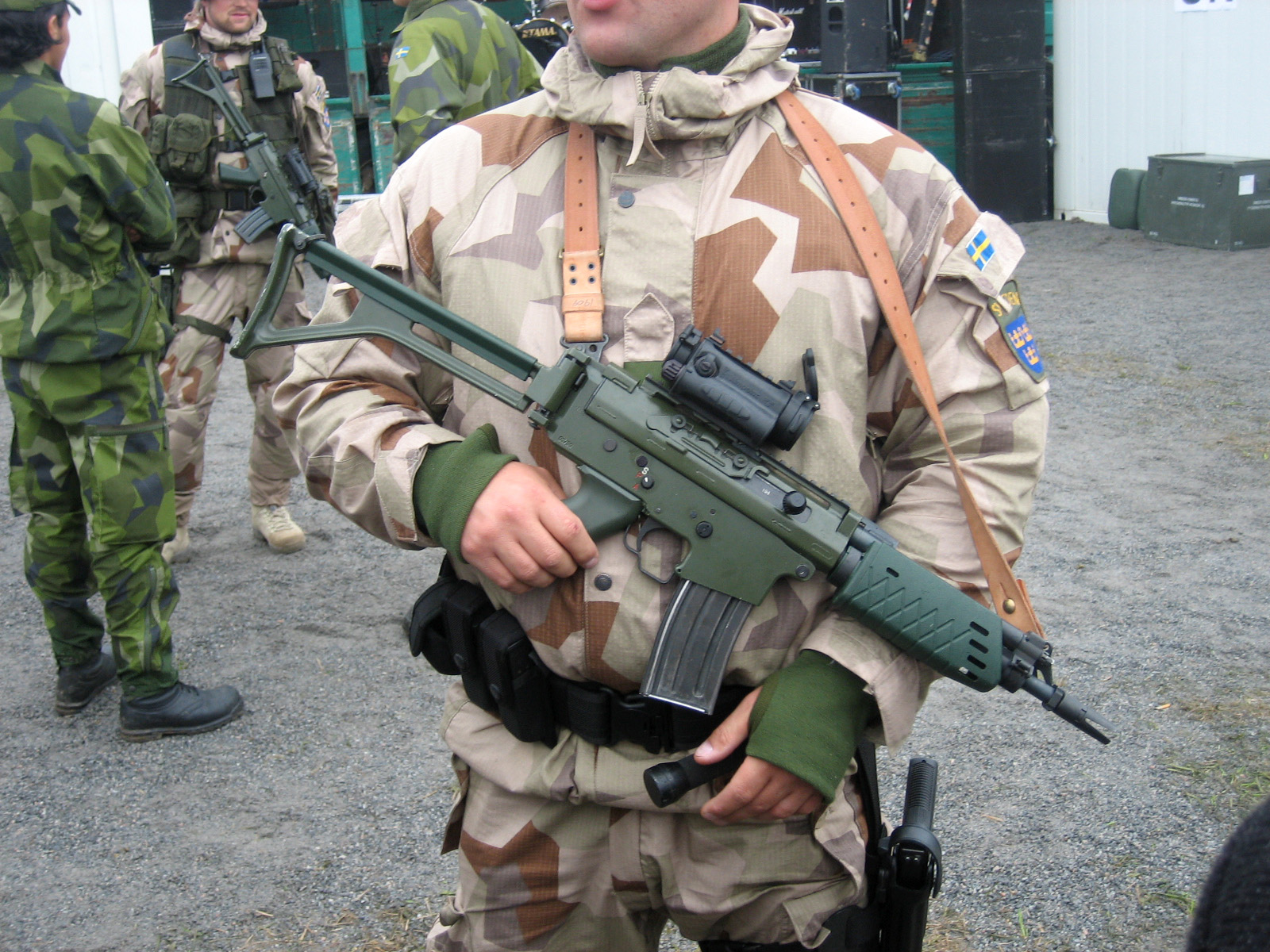
Swedish M90K desert camouflage

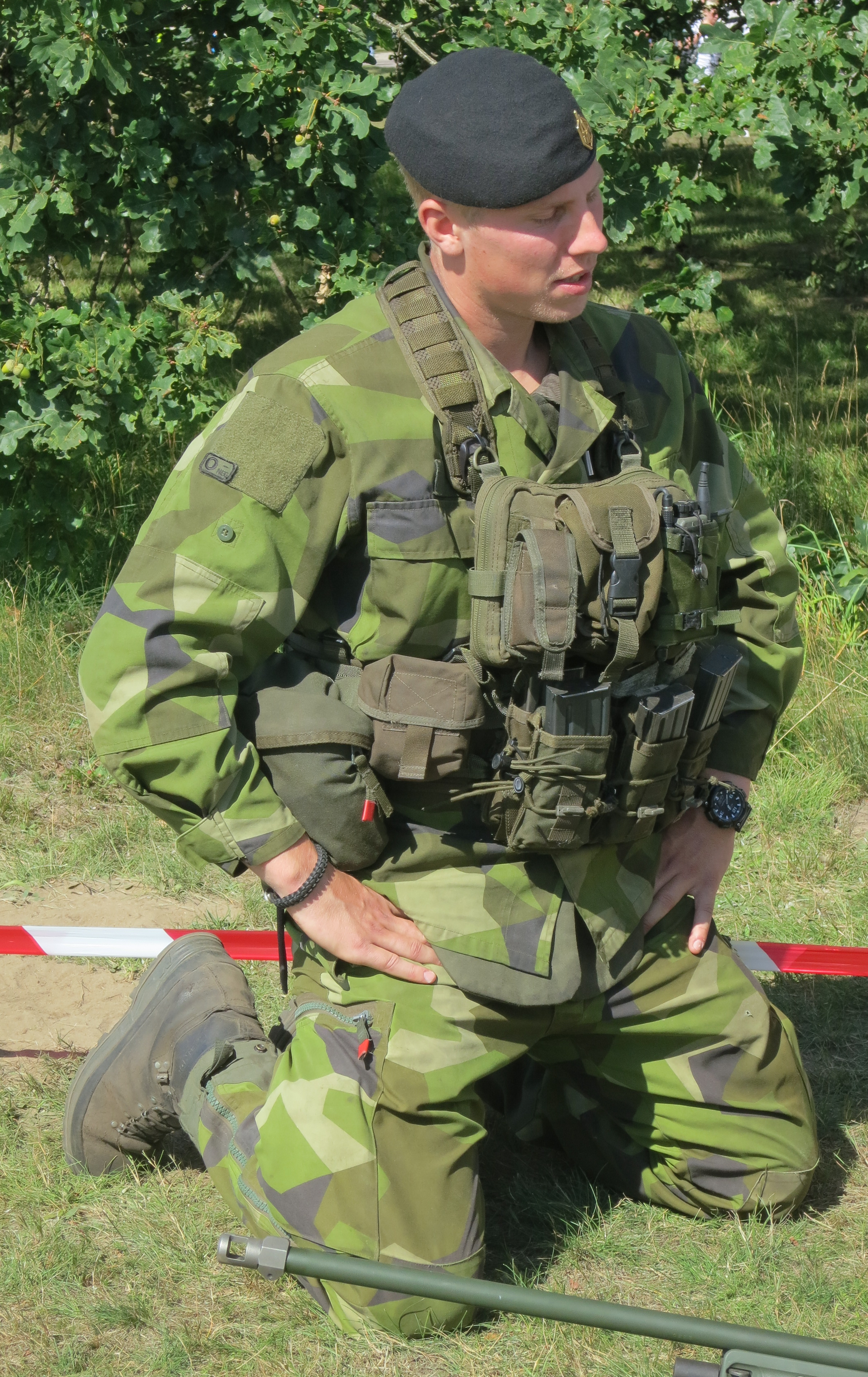
Swedish soldier wearing M90

From 1990, the Swedish armed forces carried a four-color M90 Splittertarnmuster, which is close to the bright colors printed 31 through the resumption of sharp linear triangular patches. The differences are in the schematic, because the spots are not distributed freely but directly abut and are not crossed by the dashed lines. Blue, khaki, and light green patches are distributed on a dark green background. This camouflage pattern was exported to Latvia for wear as part of SFOR forces in Bosnia and Herzegovina.

Splinter pattern camouflage

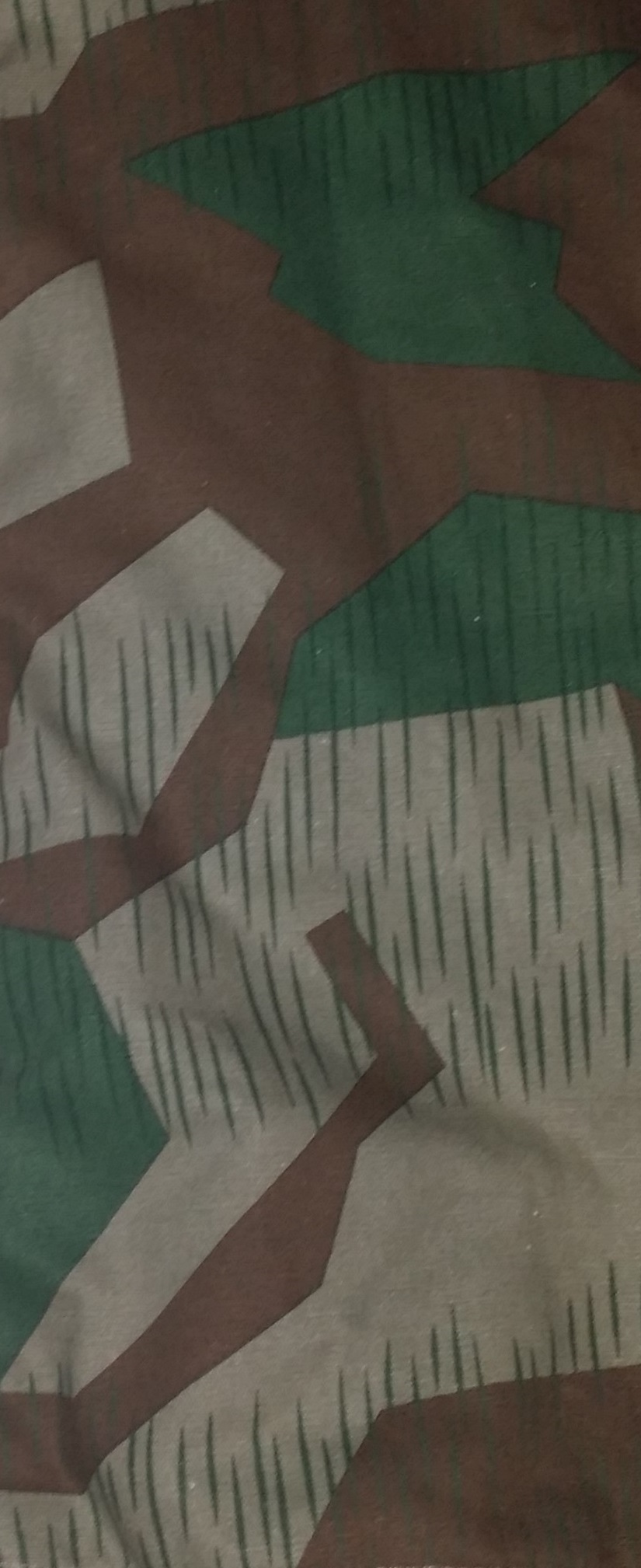
The Luftwaffe camouflage pattern, known as Splittermuster 41

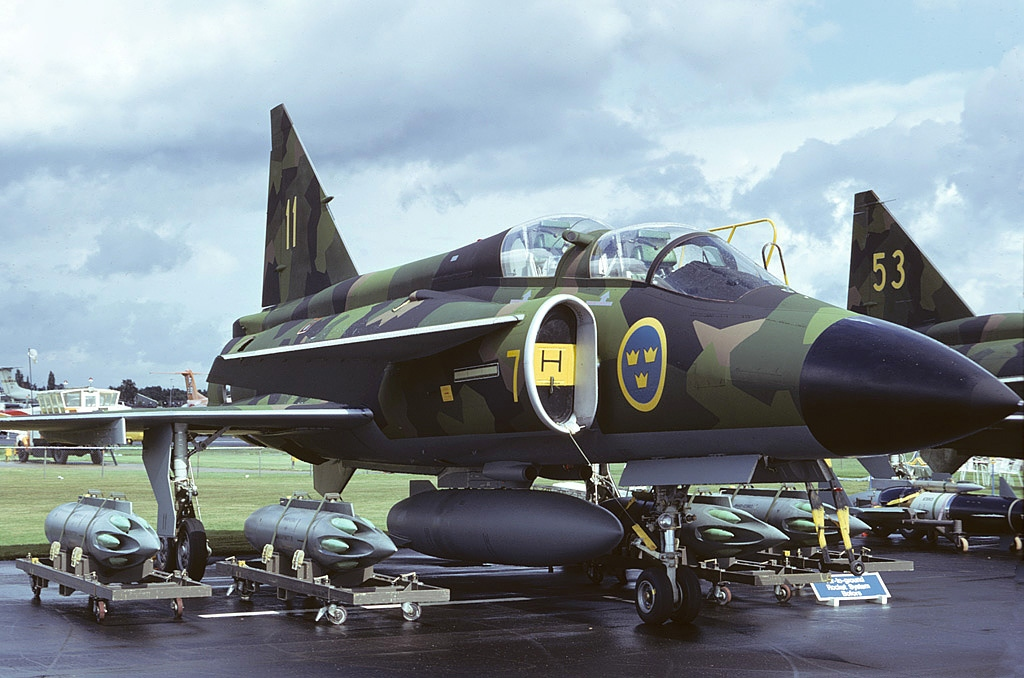
The 1960s FOA-pattern originally developed for aircraft.

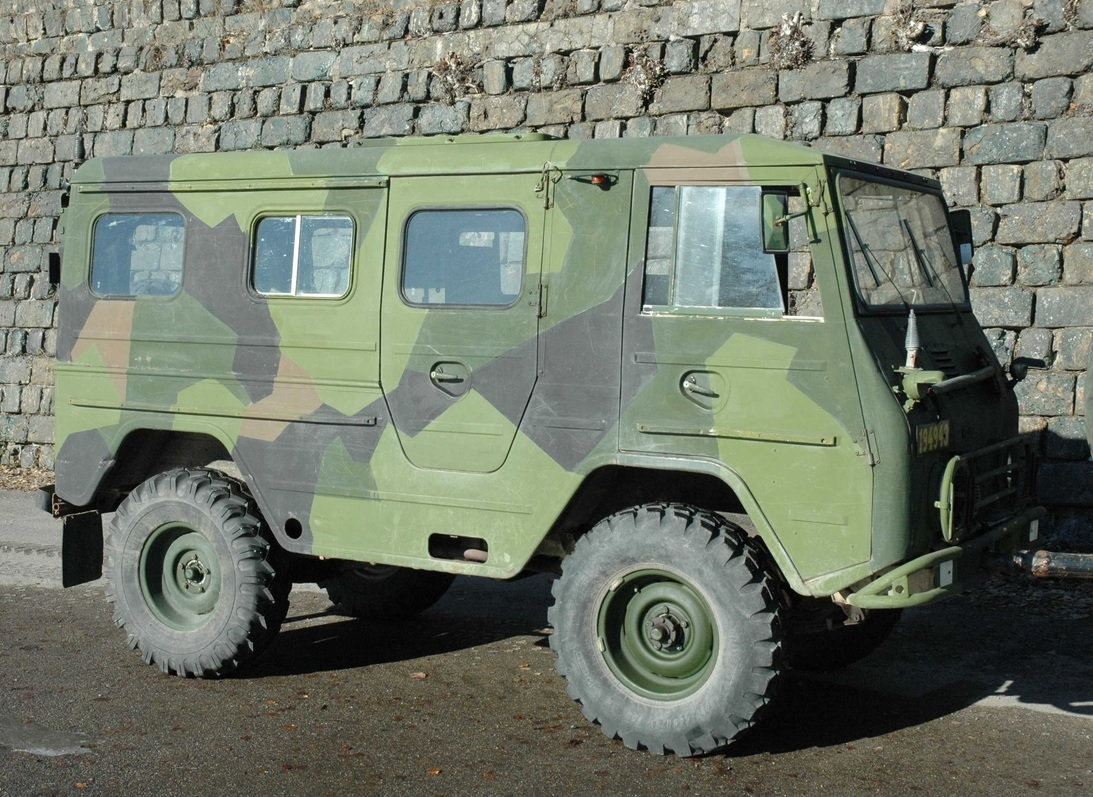
The FOA-pattern also got extensively used in the Swedish army.

The M90 camouflage pattern, derived from the FOA-pattern for the 1990s.

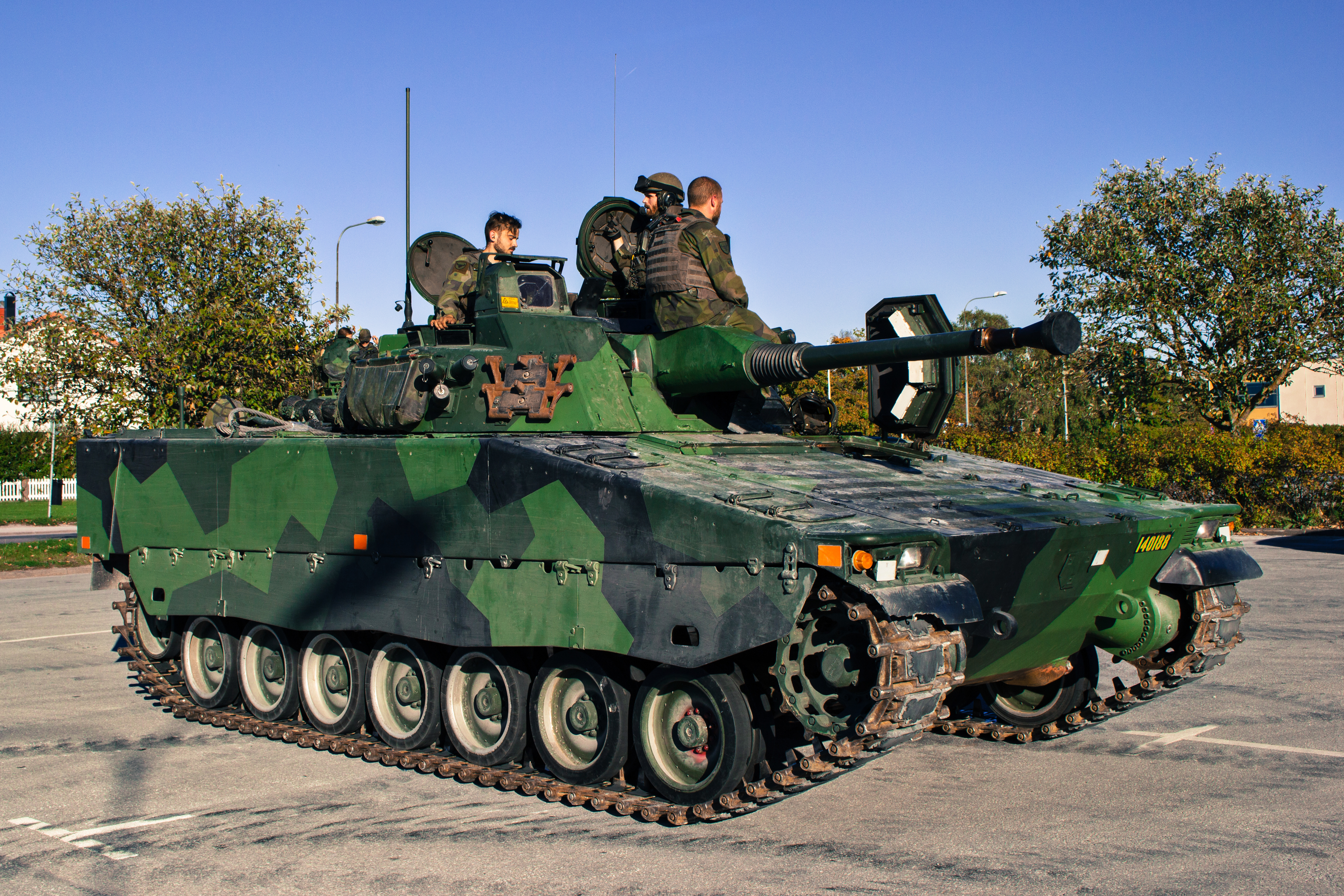
Strf 90 Infantry fighting vehicle.

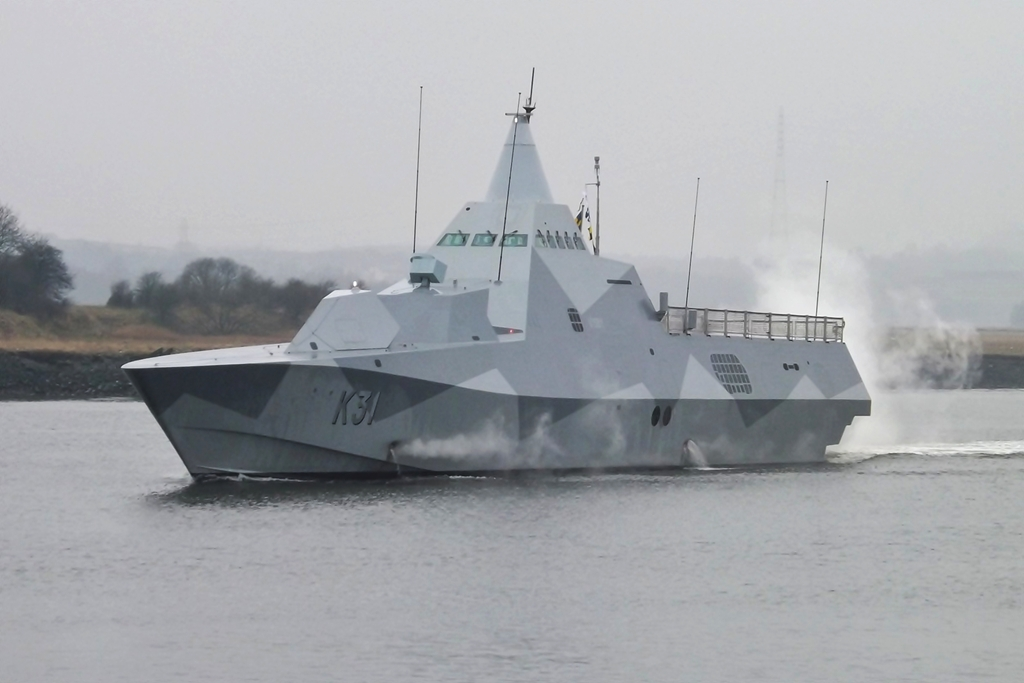
Swedish Visby class corvette.
