= German World War II camouflage patterns =

Military camouflage designs

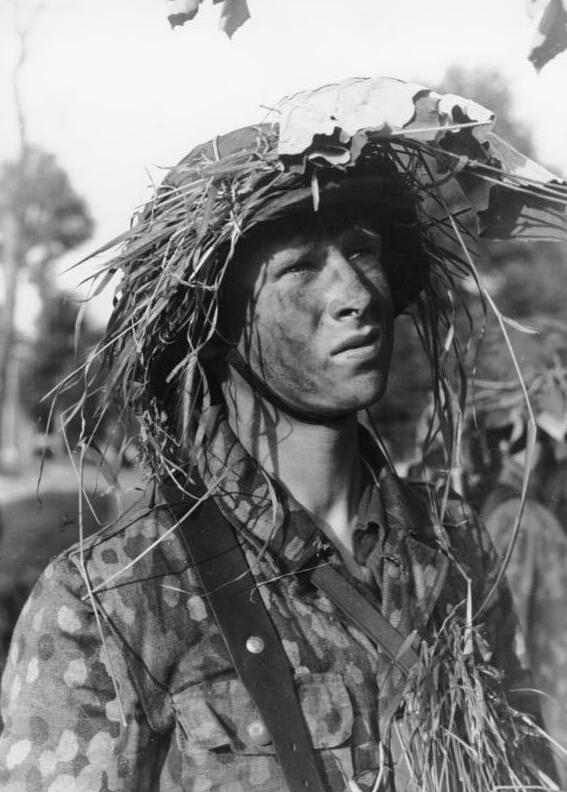
Photo of soldier of an SS-Grenadier Panzer division, Normandy, 1944, wearing a disruptively patterned Erbsenmuster patterned jacket.

German World War II camouflage patterns formed a family of disruptively patterned military camouflage designs for clothing, used and in the main designed during the Second World War. The first pattern, Splittertarnmuster ("splinter camouflage pattern"), was designed in 1931 and was initially intended for Zeltbahn shelter halves. The clothing patterns developed from it combined a pattern of interlocking irregular green, brown, and buff polygons with vertical "rain" streaks. Later patterns, all said to have been designed for the Waffen-SS by Johann Georg Otto Schick, evolved into more leaf-like forms with rounded dots or irregular shapes. Camouflage smocks were designed to be reversible, providing camouflage for two seasons, whether summer and autumn, or summer and winter (snow). Distribution was limited to the Waffen-SS, ostensibly because of a patent, though variants were used by other units, including the Luftwaffe. Production was limited by shortage of materials, especially of high quality waterproof cotton duck.

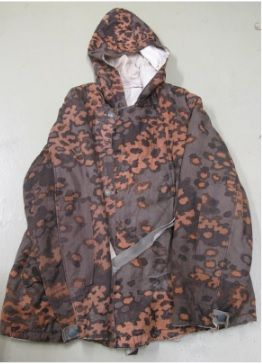
Reversible Waffen-SS parka in Eichenlaubmuster (Oak leaf A) for autumn and winter.

The Reichswehr (Army of the Weimar Republic) started experimenting with camouflage patterns for Wehrmacht uniforms before World War II and some army units used Splittertarnmuster ("splinter camouflage pattern"), first issued in 1931, and based on Zeltbahn shelter halves/groundsheets. Waffen-SS combat units used various patterns from 1935 onwards. The SS camouflage patterns were designed by Johann Georg Otto Schick, a Munich art professor and then the director of the German camouflage research unit, (Note: Almost nothing is known about Schick beyond these bare facts. The film director Michael Madsen planned to make a film, The Black Forest, about Schick's shadowy life, but it has not appeared.) at the request of an SS Major, Wim Brandt. Brandt was an engineer and the commander of the SS-VT reconnaissance battalion, and he was looking for better camouflage. Schick had researched the effect of light on trees in summer and in autumn. These led to the idea of reversible camouflage clothing, with green summer patterns on one side, brown autumn patterns on the other. In 1937, the patterns were field tested by the SS-VT Deutschland regiment, resulting in an estimate that they would cut casualties by fifteen percent. (Note: The methodology behind this claim is not known.) In 1938, a reversible spring/autumn helmet cover, smock, and sniper's face mask in Schick's forest patterns on waterproof cotton duck were patented for the Waffen-SS. The patent is said to have prevented the Wehrmacht from using the patterns, which became a distinctive emblem of the Waffen-SS during the war. However, patterned uniforms were worn by some other units, including from 1941 the Luftwaffe, which had its own version of Splittertarnmuster, as well as the Kriegsmarine (navy), the Fallschirmjäger (paratroops), and the Waffen-SS. The 1945 Leibermuster was planned to be issued to both the SS and the Wehrmacht, but it appeared too late to be widely distributed.

Production of groundsheets, helmet covers and smocks by the Warei, Forster and Joring companies began in November 1938. They were initially hand-printed, limiting deliveries by January 1939 to only 8,400 groundsheets and 6,800 helmet covers and a small number of smocks. By June 1940, machine printing had taken over, and 33,000 smocks were made for the Waffen-SS. Supplies of high quality cotton duck, however, remained critically short throughout the war, and essentially ran out in January 1943. It was replaced by non-waterproof cotton drill cloth.

== Patterns ==
The German names used for the plane tree, palm and oak leaf patterns are not those that were used in the German armed forces, but were invented by postwar collectors of militaria.

Patterns designed by Schick
German name	English name	Date	Image	Notes
Splittertarnmuster (Buntfarbenmuster)	Splinter pattern ("Colourful pattern")	1931		Being the first German camouflage pattern, it was initially used in Zeltbahn groundsheets for the Wehrmacht branches. The pattern is also known as Splinter A.
Luftwaffen- Splittertarnmuster	Luftwaffe splinter pattern	1941		German Air Force variant of Splittertarnmuster; also known as Splinter B.
Platanenmuster	Plane tree pattern	1937–1944		Used by the Waffen-SS. Spring and autumn variations, first dotted camouflage pattern
Rauchtarnmuster	Blurred Edge pattern	1942–1945		Used by the Waffen-SS. Photo shows the outer (left) and inner (right) patterns. There were two variants, Autumn/Winter (top) and Spring/Summer (bottom).
Palmenmuster	Palm tree pattern	1941–?		Spring and autumn variations, used by Waffen-SS
Beringtes; Eichenlaubmuster	Oak leaf pattern B	1942–1945		
Eichenlaubmuster	Oak leaf A	1942–1945		Spring and autumn variations, reversible Waffen-SS smocks Also for Zeltbahn tent sheets
Sumpftarnmuster	Swamp pattern	1943		Blurred and more saturated form of Splittertarnmuster, with splinter color dominance switching to green; Most smocks reversible to snow camouflage
Erbsenmuster	Pea dot pattern	1944–1945		Used by the Waffen-SS. Based on Eichenlaubmuster
Leibermuster	(named after the Leiber brothers)	1945		Bold irregular pattern. Designed to absorb infra-red. Designed to replace all previous patterns. Saw only limited usage. Basis for Swiss Alpenflage. Inspired postwar US ERDL pattern.

== See also ==
- Digital camouflage
- Flecktarn – post–World War II camouflage pattern used by the Bundeswehr

== Sources ==
- Beaver, Michael D.; Borsarello, J. F. (1995). Camouflage Uniforms of the Waffen-SS. Schiffer. ISBN 1-84176-854-5.
- Davis, Brian L. (1998). German Army uniforms and insignia : 1933 - 1945. Brockhampton Press. ISBN 978-1-86019-869-4.
- DFI (2003). "Michael Madsen born 1971 Documentaries". Danish Film Institute. Archived from the original on 2012-06-05. "... 2003 ... IN DEVELOPMENT: ... The Black Forest. A film on dead angles & Modern Identity. The life's and disappearances of Professor Otto Schick, key German master camouflage inventor, WWII"
- Dougherty, Martin J. (2017). Camouflage At War: An Illustrated Guide from 1914 to the Present Day. Amber Books. ISBN 978-1-78274-498-6.
- Ferguson, Robert; Lumsden, Robin (2009). Himmler's SS: Loyal to the Death's Head. History Press. ISBN 978-0-7524-9722-8.
- Mann, Chris (2014). SS Totenkopf: The History of the 'Death's Head' Division 1940–45. Amber Books. ISBN 978-1-907446-87-0.
- Newark, Tim (2007). Camouflage. Thames and Hudson. ISBN 978-0-500-51347-7.
- Richardson, Francis (1945). Camouflage Fabrics both Plain and Printed for Military Use by the German SS and German Army. Reprinted in: Borsarello, J.F. (Ed.) (1990). SS & Wehrmacht Camouflage, ISO Publications.
- Wilkinson-Latham, Ed (2011). "A Short History of Camouflage". Toronto Standard.
