= Shelter-half =

Military field equipment

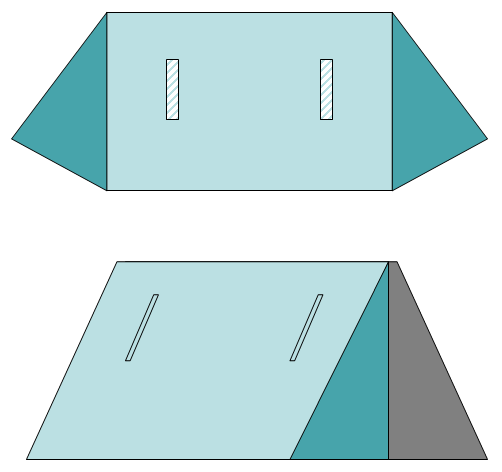
Schematics of a German Bundeswehr shelter half (Zeltbahn)

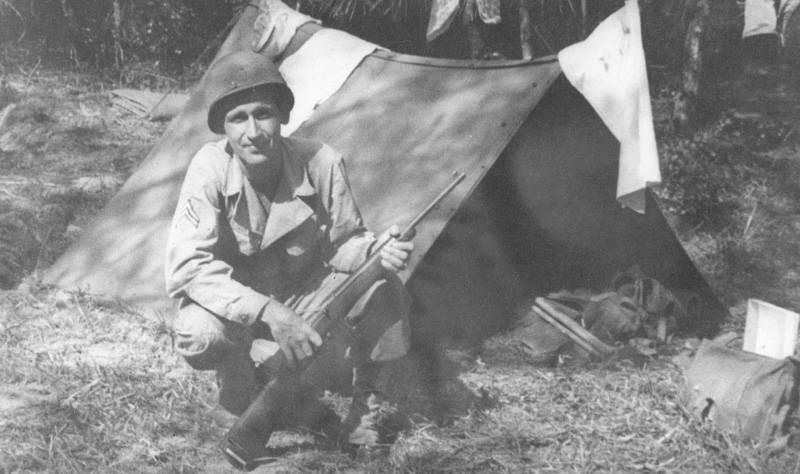
U.S. Army pup tent in World War II, and made with two shelter halves

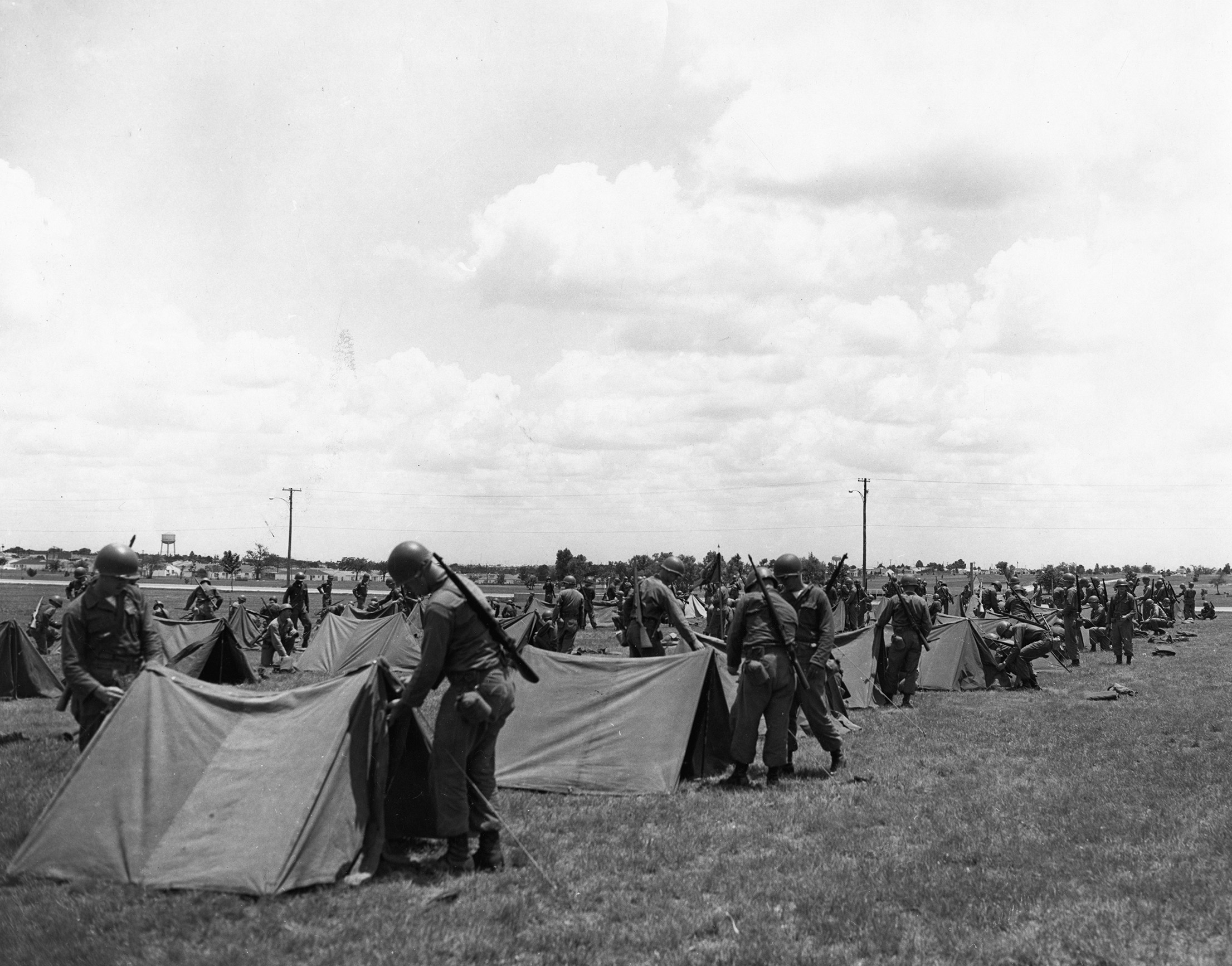
Arlington State College ROTC students setting up pup tents during an exercise on campus, circa 1950s

A shelter-half is a simple kind of partial tent designed to provide temporary shelter and concealment when combined with one or more sections. Two sheets of canvas or a similar material (the halves) are fastened together with snaps, straps or buttons to form a larger surface. The shelter-half is then erected using poles, ropes, pegs, and whatever tools are on hand, forming an inverted V structure. Small tents like these are often called pup tents in American English.

== Background ==
Shelter halves are a mainstay of most armies, and are known from the mid 19th century. Often, each soldier carries one shelter-half and half the poles, etc., and they pair off to erect a two-man tent. The size and shape of each half shelter piece may vary from army to army, but are typically rectangular, triangular or lozenge shaped. When time and space allow, some forms of half-shelters can be combined into a larger, more complex tent.

Shelter-halves are usually designed to serve double duty as ponchos against the rain, or for the concealment of snipers. While the fabric is often simple olive drab, several nations use camouflaged fabric. The first printed camouflage for soldiers were the Italian Telo mimetico introduced in 1929 for their half-shelters. The first camouflage uniforms were the Second World War German paratrooper smock, based on their M1931 Splittermuster shelter-halves. The Austro-Hungarian army used the M888 zeltbahn that was first issued in an ochre color, later in grey color that had a bayonet hole allowing the rifle to be used as an ad-hoc tent pole. Russian Army has used plasch-palatkas (literally "cape-tents", designed to be used as both a part of a larger tent cover, or an individual weatherproof cape) since 1894, and the modern version, virtually unchanged since, was introduced in 1936, with the camo version being available since 1942. To add some confusion, the ordinary waterproofed cape with a similar name (plasch-nakidka, "cape-overcoat") was issued at the same time, but these were not intended to combine with each other.

== Gallery ==
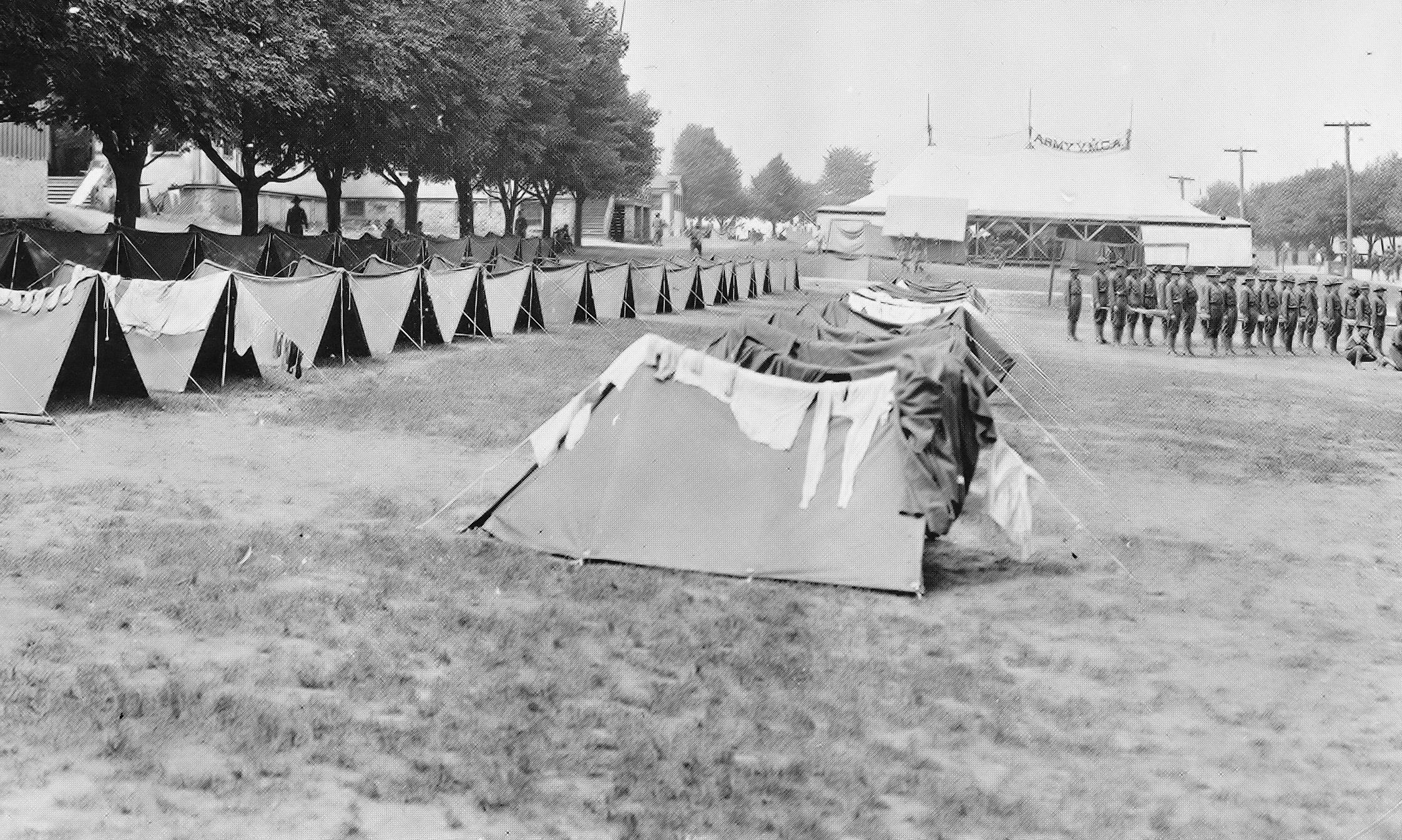
Camp Crane pup tents

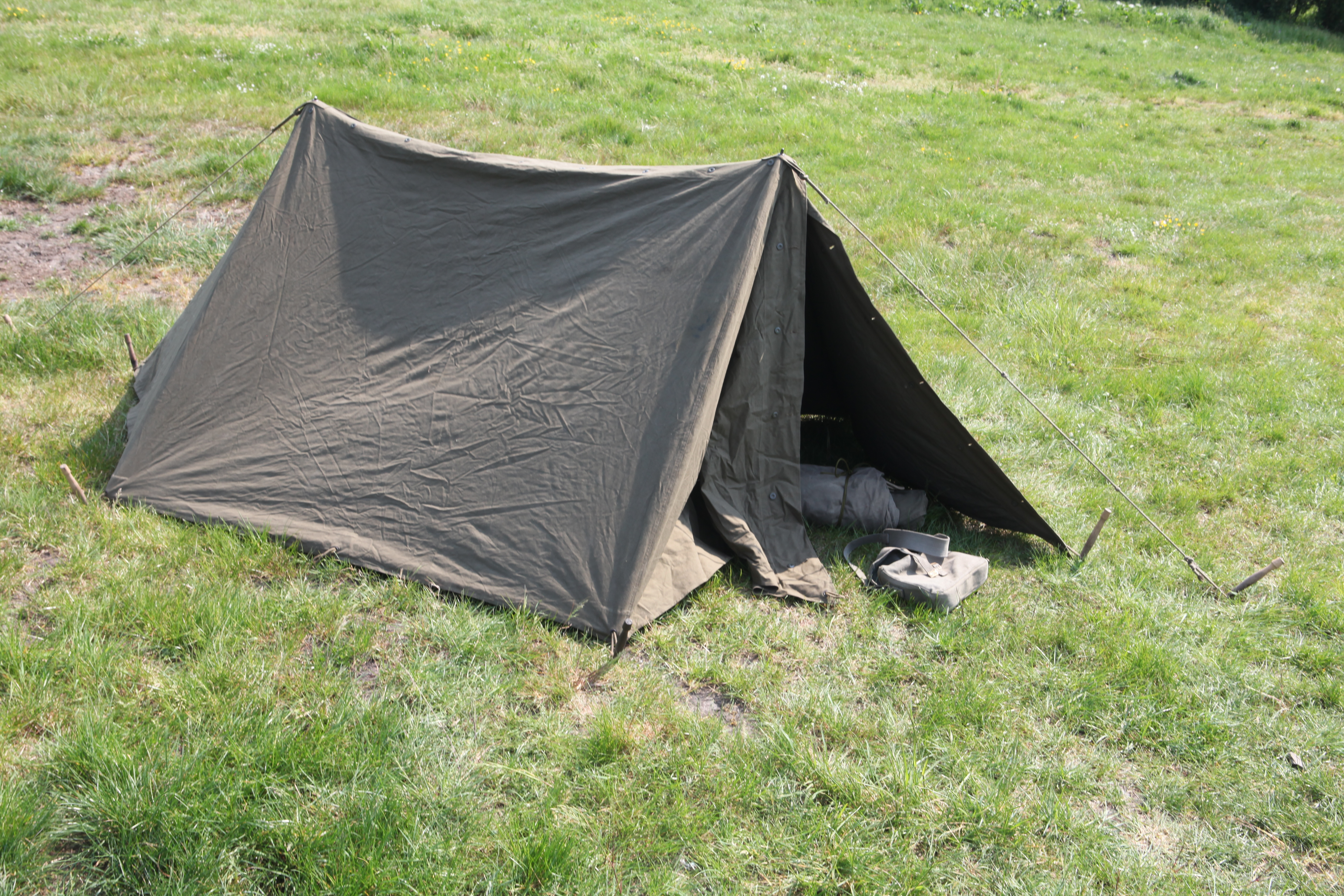
Dutch Army pup tent from 1955

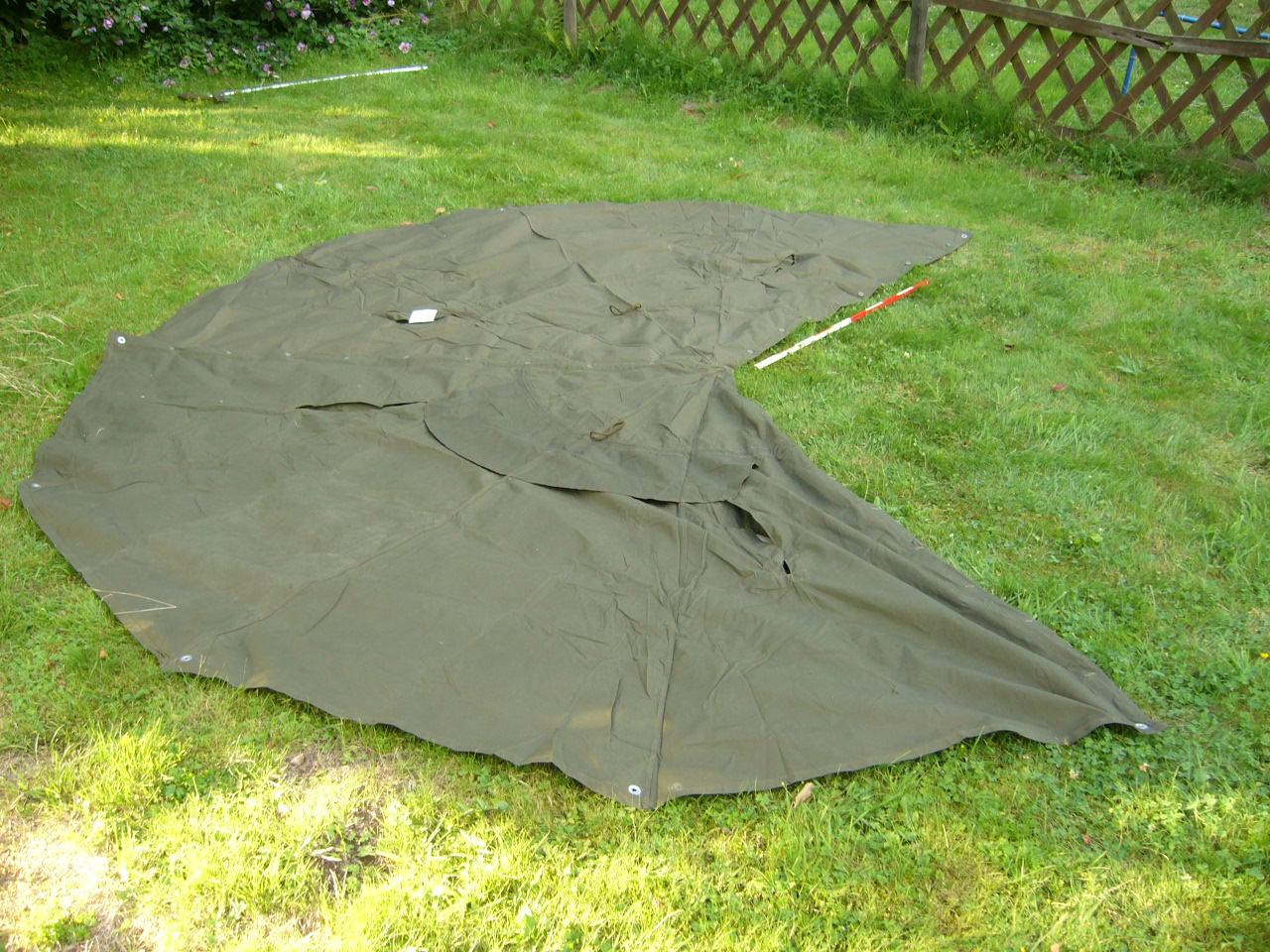
Two Polish Army shelter halves fastened together

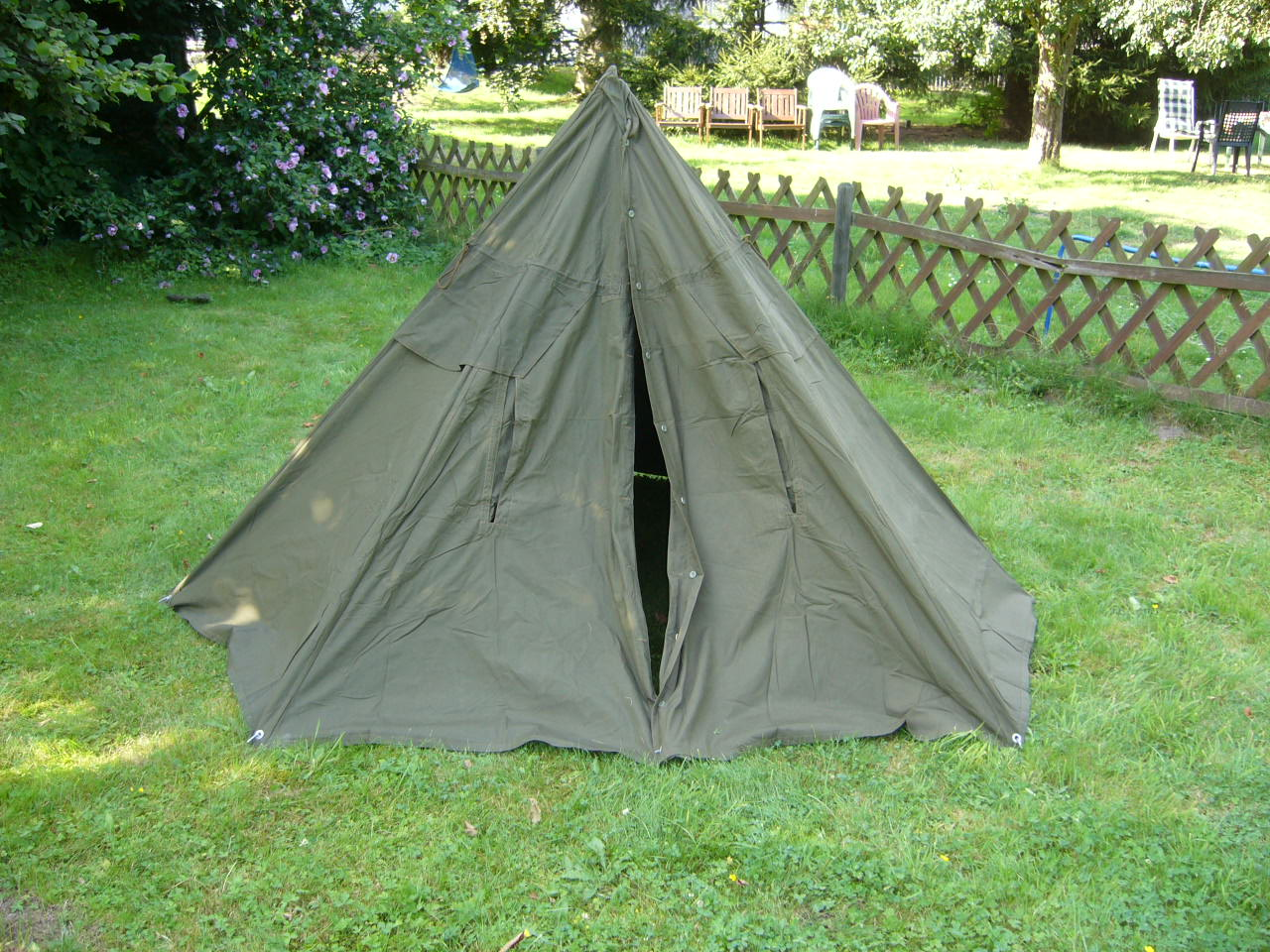
Polish Army tent erected

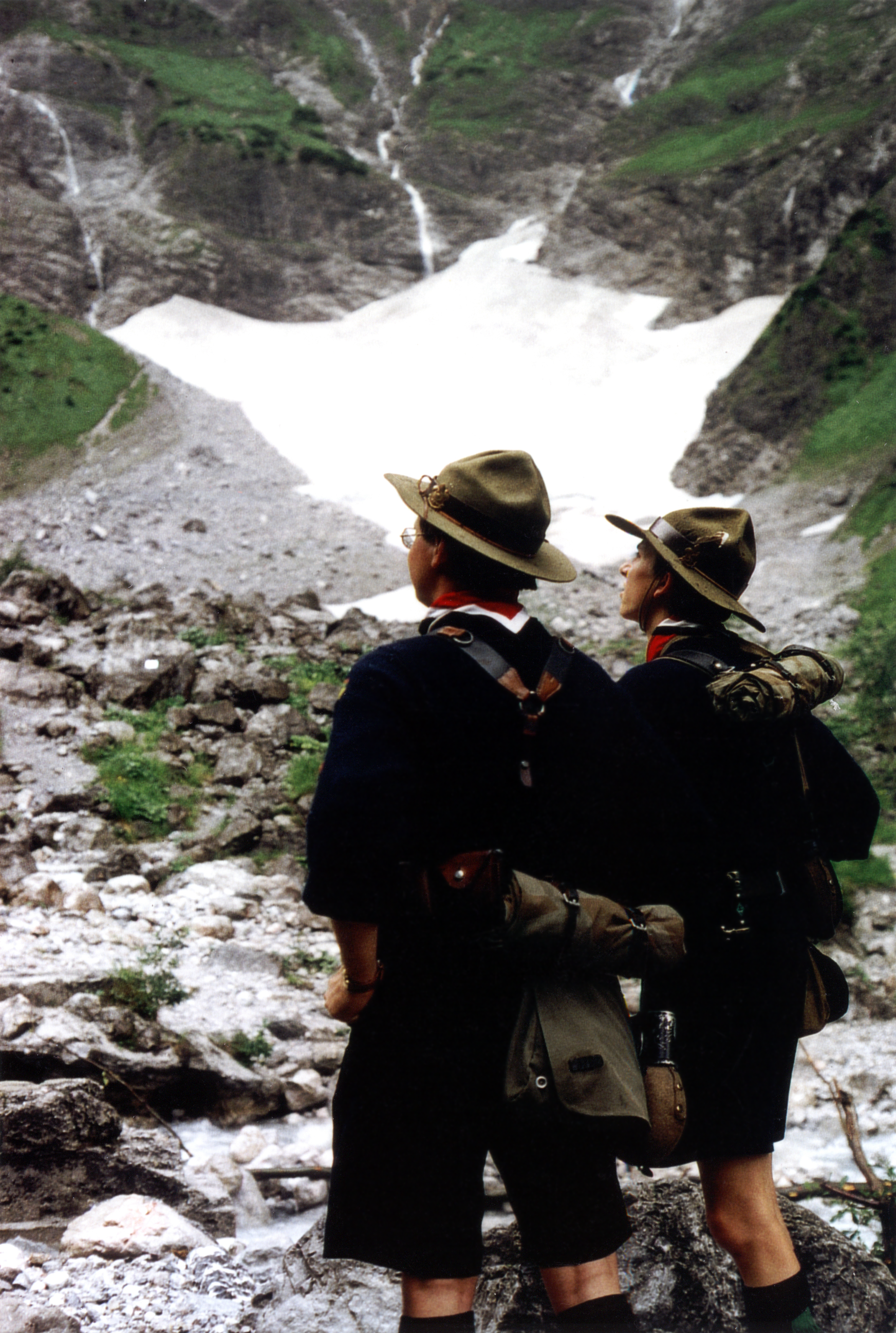
German Boy Scouts with M1931 Splittermuster shelter-halves in 1993

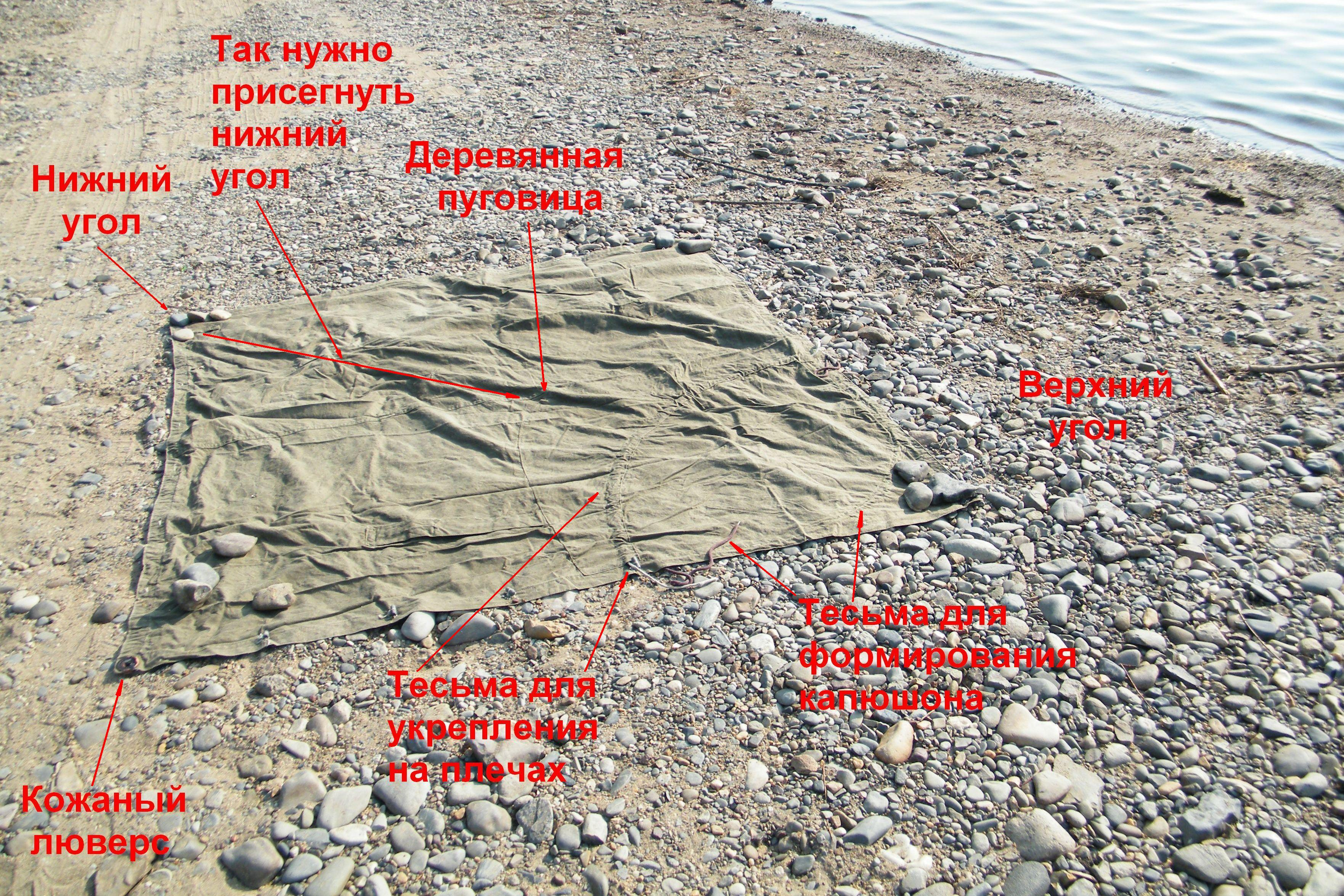
Russian plasch-palatka spread over ground

== See also ==
- Bivouac shelter
- Lean-to
- Swag (bedroll)
- Swedish torch
