= Erbsenmuster =

German WWII military camouflage pattern

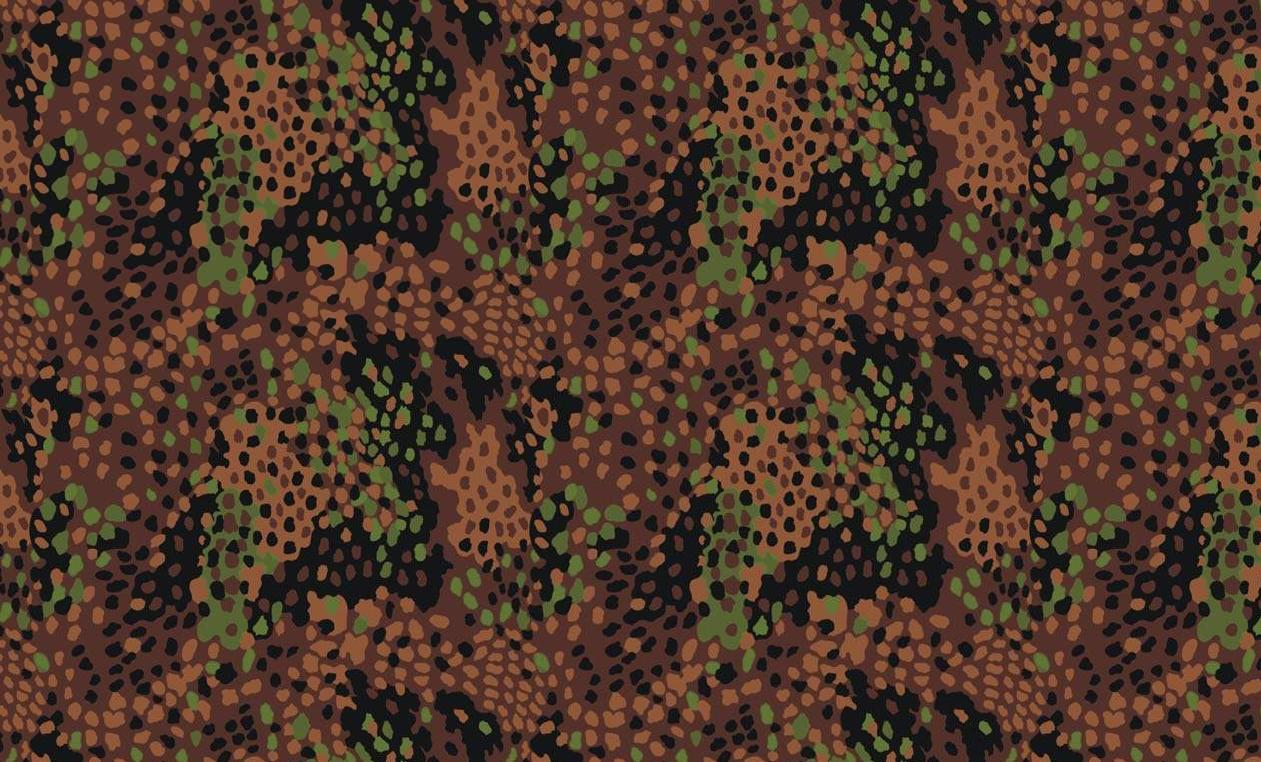
Erbsenmuster pattern

The Erbsenmuster or pea pattern was one of a family of German World War II camouflage patterns, said to have been designed by Johann Georg Otto Schick, and first issued to the Waffen-SS in 1944. The pattern had five colours, pale brown, dark brown, green, olive green and black, arranged as small rounded areas dotted over large irregular areas.

== Development ==
It was developed from Eichenlaubmuster, the oak leaf pattern. Its style was quite unlike earlier German camouflage smocks: unlike them, it was not reversible.

It was a two-piece uniform and could be worn either by itself in warm weather, or over other uniform; the camouflage pattern was intended to be effective all year round.
