= Telo mimetico =

Type of military camouflage pattern

M1929 Telo Mimetico
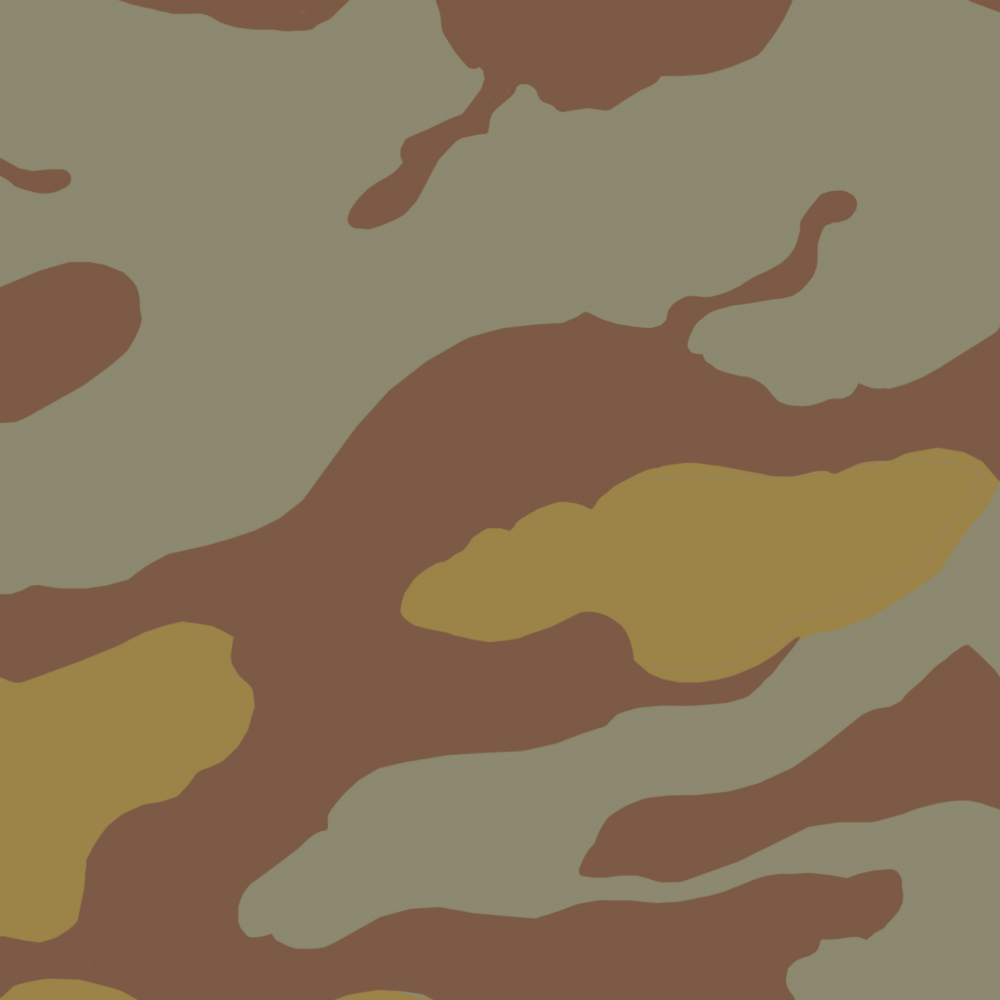
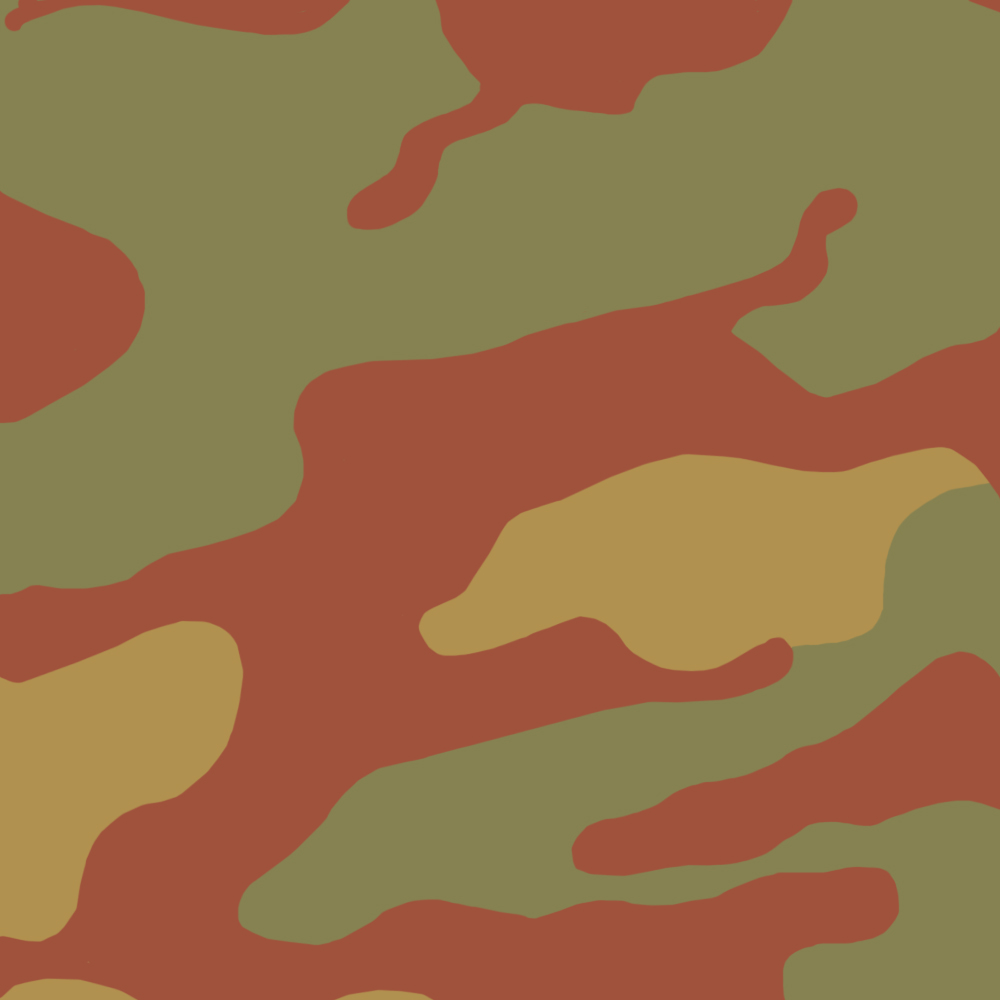
- Two TM variants. The top image is the pattern made in 1940 and the bottom image is the pattern made in 1960.
- Type: Military camouflage pattern
- Place of origin: Kingdom of Italy

Service history
- In service: 1929-1990s
- Used by: See Distribution for more details.
- Wars: World War II

Production history
- Produced: 1929-1990s

M1929 Telo mimetico (Italian: camouflage cloth) was a military camouflage pattern used by the Italian Army for shelter-halves (telo tenda) and later for uniforms for much of the 20th century. Being first issued in 1929 and only fully discontinued in the early 1990s, it has the distinction of being the first printed camouflage pattern for general issue, and the camouflage pattern in longest continuous use in the world.

== History ==
Originally only printed on shelter halves, the pattern was not intended to be worn by soldiers though the shelter halves could be used as rain-ponchoes. From 1942, the printed fabric was also used for smocks for the Italian paratroopers. At some point before the outbreak of the Second World War, the pattern was changed, possibly to accommodate printing with smaller rolls. It was scaled down and compressed slightly lengthwise, but otherwise kept the shapes and colours of the first production. The pattern varied with time, the colours becoming brighter while the print became less crisp.

The pattern was continued into the 1990s, when it was replaced by a pattern based on US Woodland.

== Distribution ==
In 1944, telo mimetico was adopted by the Germans and distributed to Waffen-SS units operating in Italy and Normandy during the spring and summer of 1944. Most frequently published photos show members of the 1st and 12th SS Panzer Divisions wearing the Italian attire along with a mix of standard issue Waffen-SS uniforms and equipment. After the Italian surrender, stocks of the Italian pattern were captured and used on other fronts. Some of it appears to have ended up in the hands of Czechoslovak and Soviet units. In 1974, under the Republic of Afghanistan, commandos and paratroopers of the Afghan Army would adopt the pattern and continue its use during the 1980s, with fabric being printed in-country and produced locally.

It is possible that the whole production machinery was moved by the Germans to Czechoslovakia, laying the foundation for the country's post-war production.

== In art ==
The pattern also has the honour of having been deemed a work of art in itself. In 1966, the Italian artist Alighiero Boetti stretched sections of the fabric on frames under the title "Mimetico" (camouflage) as part of an exhibition on the Arte Povera movement.

It was a challenge to the abstract tachist tradition of painting large, flat sections of colour.
