= Garnish =

Garnish may refer to:

- Garnishment, withholding of wages to pay a debt
- Garnish (fee), a fee paid by a new prisoner to other prisoners upon arrival at a jail
- Garnish (cooking), an embellishment or decoration of food or drink
  - Cocktail garnish, a decorative ornament for a mixed drink
- Garnish, Newfoundland and Labrador, Canada, a town
- Garnish Island, County Cork, Ireland
- Garnish GAA, a Gaelic Athletic Association club in Allihies, County Cork
- Garnish, an aspect of military camouflage
- Garnish (automobile), a decorative piece on the exterior or interior of an automobile

== See also ==
- Garnish Formation, Newfoundland, a geologic formation
