= Downs Point Formation =

- Stratigraphic range: 629 – 623 Ma
- Type: Formation
- Unit of: Connaigre Bay Group

Lithology
- Primary: Siliciclastic non-marine

Location
- Region: Newfoundland
- Country: Canada
- Occurrence of the Downs Point Formation in southeastern Newfoundland

The Downs Point Formation is a formation cropping out in Newfoundland, Canada.
