= Louis Guingot =

French painter and camoufleur

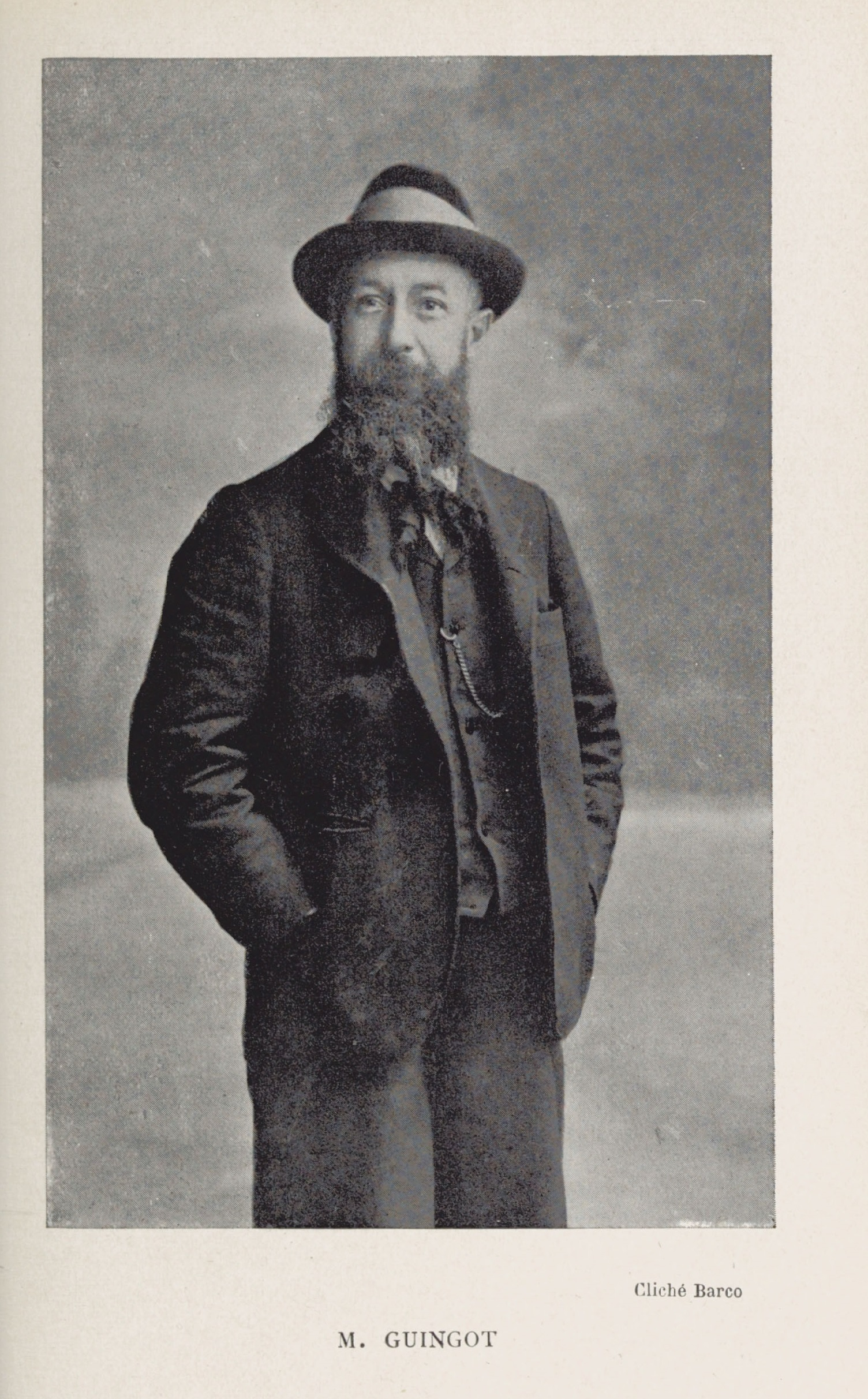
Image of Louis Guingot

Louis Guingot (3 January 1864–16 December 1948) was a French mural painter and founding member of the École de Nancy (the Nancy School). He was the first French camoufleur in the First World War, credited as the inventor of military camouflage for the French army. In 1914, he created a prototype camouflaged battledress for the French army, which it rejected, only to take up the idea later for artillery guns.

== Early life ==
Louis Guingot was born at Remiremont on 3 January 1864 in Lorraine. He studied art at the Beaux-Arts de Paris in 1880 and at the École nationale supérieure des arts décoratifs in Paris. There he was noticed by Pierre-Victor Galland, director of the Manufacture des Gobelins, who included him in his team to participate in the decoration of the Panthéon in Paris and many buildings and castles in Central Europe until 1889. The director of the Théâtre des Variétés then made him its chief decorator for three years.

He married Marie Lambert in 1892 before joining the circle of artists in Nancy. He then spent time with Émile Gallé, painter of the Art Nouveau movement and founder with Louis Majorelle of the Nancy school of painting in 1901. The painter had his villa La Chaumière built by the architects Weissenburger of the Rue d'Auxonne in Nancy. His garden, with structures decorated by many artists of the school of Nancy, was visited by Sisowath, King of Cambodia, and his delegation in July 1906.

== Mural painter ==
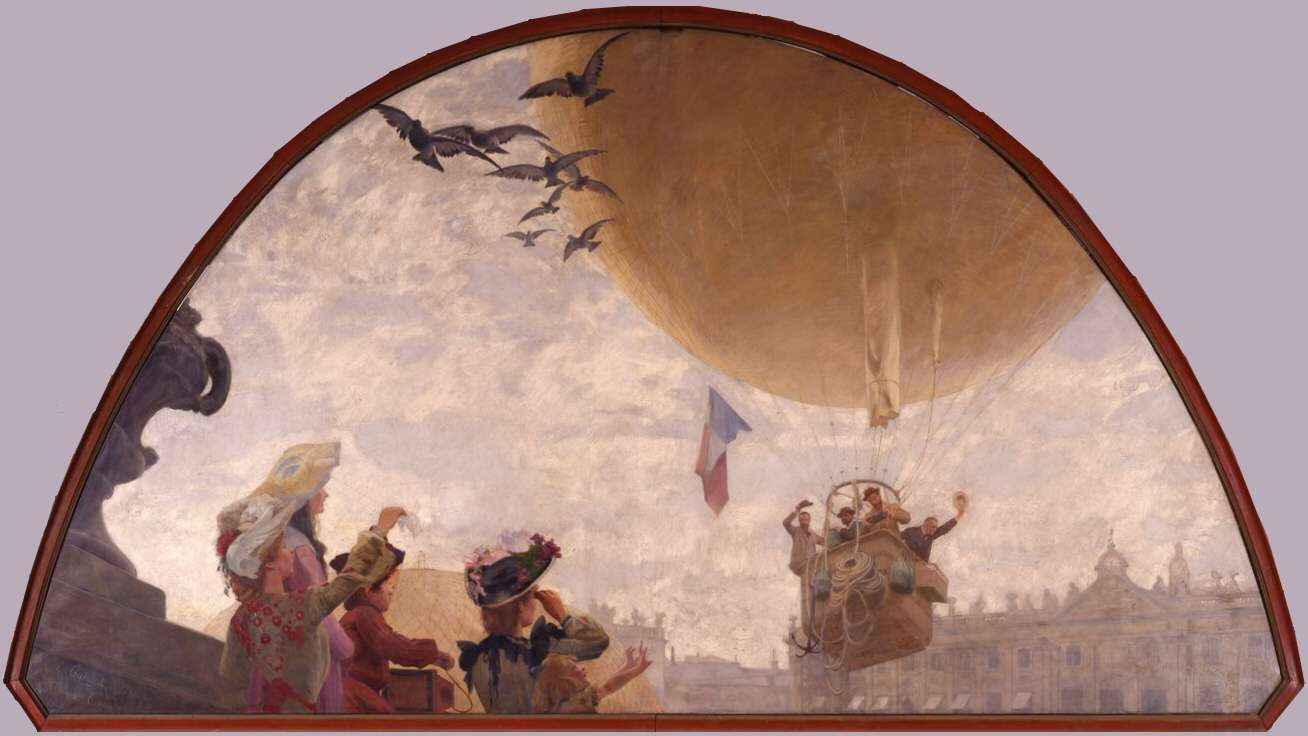
"The Balloon Flight" by Louis Guingot, 1902. In the balloon are Guingot, the artist Émile Friant, the inventor Henri Belliéni, and the mayor of Nancy, Hippolyte Maringer

Guingot's training as a painter led him to the mural decoration of public and religious buildings in his region, such as the theatres of Verdun, Lunéville and Bussang. He notably painted three frescoes in the church of Vaubexy in around 1900. He worked on the decoration of restaurants and castles such as the chateau of Manoncourt-sur-Seille (Château Colin) in Lorraine, the Vittel casino, the Charmes brasserie, the ceiling of the town hall of Épinal, and the jam factory in Liverdun.

He was a member of the steering committee of the Nancy School from 1901. His work was selected for the portico of the Palais des Fêtes for the Nancy International Exhibition in 1909. Among his other functions, he was chief decorator of the Théâtre des Variétés in Montmartre. He worked as decorator of the Théâtre du Peuple in Bussang, being a close friend of Maurice Pottecher and chief decorator of the Lunéville theatre. He worked with René Wiener on the creation of bindings. His son Henri Guingot (1897-1952) was curator of the Musée d'Épinal and co-founder of the Musée de l'Imagerie.

== Camoufleur ==
Louis Guingot's 1914 prototype "Leopard" pattern camouflage jacket, sent to and returned by the French army, minus a rectangle cut out as a sample

Guingot was interested in new decorative processes for fabrics and hangings, which led him to seek a military camouflage unit during the First World War, alongside Jean-Baptiste Eugène Corbin. He and his son Henri started creating camouflage for the army in his studio in Nancy, in the autumn of 1914. He then joined the army and worked in the special painters section specialized in the manufacture of this fabric. He was the inventor of France's first military camouflage, as illustrated by the "leopard" outfit. The original jacket was donated to the Lorrain Museum in Nancy in 1981 by Albert Conte, his last pupil from 1942 to 1945 in Lay-Saint-Christophe, which received it from the artist's widow in 1976. He had sent the prototype linen camouflage jacket to the French army and proposed his invention. It was returned to him with a (lost) letter expressing interest; a rectangle had been cut on the right side. The army kept the sample, but never contacted the inventor again. However, his idea was taken up for the camouflage of artillery guns. A camouflage unit such as he had suggested, employing several artists, was set up at Domgermain in Meurthe-et-Moselle, under the direction of Guirand de Scévola.

== Death and legacy ==
He is buried in Bouxières-aux-Dames near Nancy in Lorraine. His former house has been converted to flats, but its original facade survives.

== Principal works ==
- Camouflage materials, displayed at the Musée Lorrain, Nancy
- Frescoes of the four seasons for the Château of Manoncourt-sur-Seille in Meurthe-et-Moselle
- Frescoes in the choir of the church of Vaubexy in the Vosges
- Painting at Musée français de la brasserie in Saint-Nicolas-de-Port
- Arbre (Tree), first half of 20th century. Musée départemental d'art ancien et contemporain, Épinal
- Paravent (Screen), c. 1900. Musée départemental d'art ancien et contemporain, Épinal
