= Grand Bank Sequence =

- Stratigraphic range: Neoproterozoic
- Type: Formation
- Unit of: Marystown Group

Lithology
- Primary: Sandstones (siliciclastic)

Location
- Region: Newfoundland
- Country: Canada
- Occurrence of the Grand Bank Sequence in southeastern Newfoundland

The Grand Bank Sequence is a formation cropping out in Newfoundland.
