= Tilt Hills Formation =

Geological formation in Newfoundland, Canada

- Stratigraphic range: Neoproterozoic
- Type: Formation
- Unit of: Marystown Group

Lithology
- Primary: Mafic volcanics

Location
- Region: Newfoundland
- Country: Canada
- Occurrence of the Tilt Hills Formation in southeastern Newfoundland

The Tilt Hills Formation is a formation cropping out in Newfoundland.
