= Sam Head Formation =

- Stratigraphic range: 629 – 623 Ma (Ediacaran)
- Type: Formation
- Unit of: Connaigre Bay Group

Lithology
- Primary: Marine siliciclastic deposits

Location
- Region: Newfoundland
- Country: Canada
- Occurrence of the Sam Head Formation in southeastern Newfoundland

The Sam Head Formation is a formation cropping out in Newfoundland.
