= Barasway Formation =

- Stratigraphic range: Neoproterozoic
- Type: Formation
- Unit of: Marystown Group

Lithology
- Primary: Hypabyssal felsic volcanics

Location
- Region: Newfoundland
- Country: Canada
- Occurrence of the Barasway Formation in southeastern Newfoundland

The Barasway Formation is a volcanic formation cropping out in Newfoundland.
