= Mount Lucy Anne Formation =

- Stratigraphic range: Neoproterozoic
- Type: Formation
- Unit of: Marystown Group

Lithology
- Primary: Mafic volcanics

Location
- Region: Newfoundland
- Country: Canada
- Occurrence of the Mount Lucy Anne Formation in southeastern Newfoundland

The Mount Lucy Anne Formation is a formation cropping out in Newfoundland.
