= Harbour My God Point Formation =

- Stratigraphic range: Neoproterozoic
- Type: Formation
- Unit of: Marystown Group

Location
- Region: Newfoundland
- Country: Canada
- Occurrence of the Harbour My God Point Formation in southeastern Newfoundland

The Harbour My God Point Formation is a formation cropping out in Newfoundland.
