= Doughball Point Formation =

Geologic formation in Canada

- Stratigraphic range: 629–623 Ma
- Type: Formation
- Unit of: Connaigre Bay Group

Lithology
- Primary: Mafic volcanics

Location
- Region: Newfoundland
- Country: Canada
- Occurrence of the Doughball Point Formation in southeastern Newfoundland

The Doughball Point Formation is an early Ediacaran volcanic formation cropping out in Newfoundland.
