= Vaubexy =

- Commune
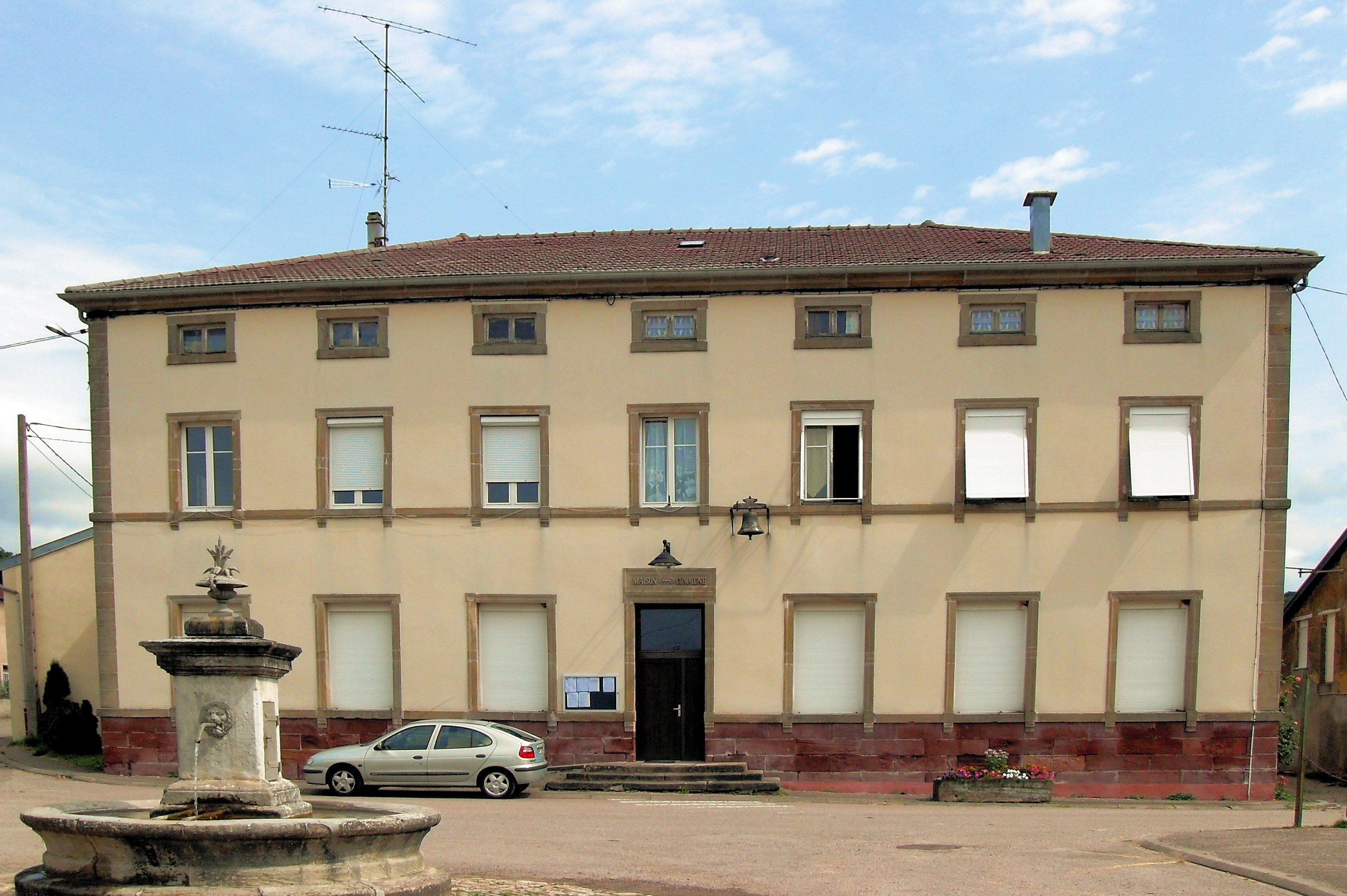
- The town hall in Vaubexy
- Location of Vaubexy
- Location within France Location within Grand Est
- Coordinates: 48°16′50″N 6°14′12″E
- Country: France
- Region: Grand Est
- Department: Vosges
- Arrondissement: Neufchâteau
- Canton: Darney
- Intercommunality: CC Mirecourt Dompaire

Government
  - Mayor (2023–2026): Audrey Perron
- Area^{1}: 6.52 km^{2} (2.52 sq mi)
- Elevation: 305 m (1,001 ft)
- Highest elevation: 397 m (1,302 ft)
- Lowest elevation: 286 m (938 ft)
- Population (2023): 125
  - Density: 19.2/km^{2} (49.7/sq mi)
- Time zone: UTC+01:00 (CET)
  - Summer (DST): UTC+02:00 (CEST)
- INSEE/Postal code: 88494 /88500
- ^{1} French Land Register data, which excludes lakes, ponds, glaciers > 1 km^{2} (0.386 sq mi or 247 acres) and river estuaries.

Vaubexy is a commune in the Vosges department in Grand Est in northeastern France.

== See also ==
- Communes of the Vosges department
