= Military camouflage =

Camouflage used to protect from enemy observation

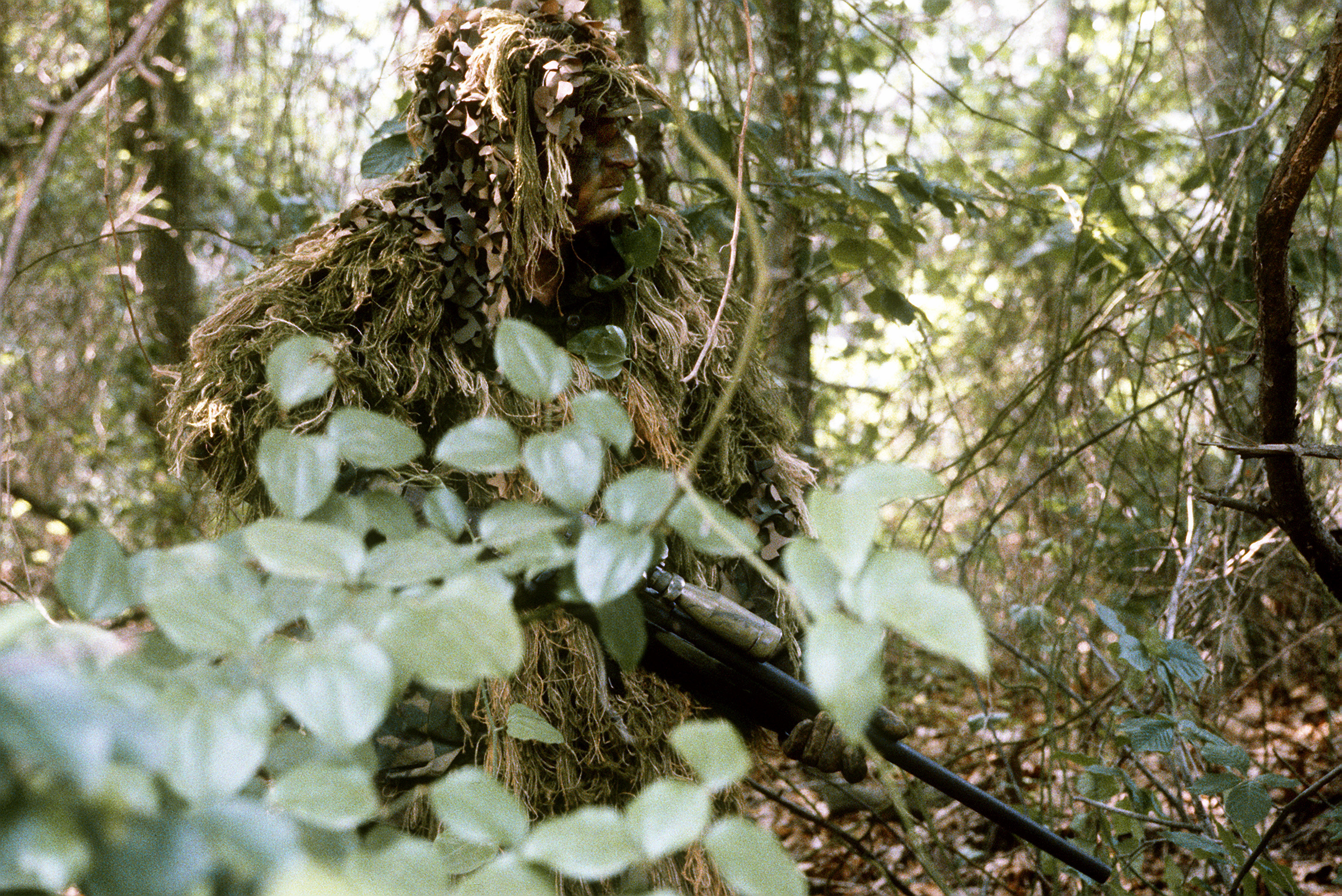
Sniper wearing a ghillie suit

Military camouflage is the use of camouflage by an armed force to protect personnel and equipment from observation by enemy forces. In practice, this means applying colour and materials to military equipment of all kinds, including vehicles, ships, aircraft, gun positions and battledress, either to conceal it from observation (crypsis), or to make it appear as something else (mimicry). The French slang word camouflage came into common English usage during World War I when the concept of visual deception developed into an essential part of modern military tactics. In that war, long-range artillery and observation from the air combined to expand the field of fire, and camouflage was widely used to decrease the danger of being targeted or enable surprise. As such, military camouflage is a form of military deception in addition to cultural functions such as political identification.

Camouflage was first practiced in simple form in the mid 18th century by rifle units. Their tasks required them to be inconspicuous, and they were issued green and later other drab colour uniforms. With the advent of longer range and more accurate weapons, especially the repeating rifle, camouflage was adopted for the uniforms of all armies, spreading to most forms of military equipment including ships and aircraft.

Camouflage for equipment and positions was extensively developed for military use by the French in 1915, soon followed by other World War I armies. In both world wars, artists were recruited as camouflage officers. Ship camouflage developed via conspicuous dazzle camouflage schemes during WWI, but has received less attention since the development of radar. Aircraft, especially in World War II, were often countershaded: painted with different schemes above and below, to camouflage them against the ground and sky respectively. Some forms of camouflage have elements of scale invariance, designed to disrupt outlines at different distances, typically digital camouflage patterns made of pixels.

The proliferation of more advanced sensors beginning in the 21st century led to the development of modern multi-spectral camouflage, which addresses visibility not only to visible light but also near infrared, short-wave infrared, radar, ultraviolet, and thermal imaging.

Military camouflage patterns have been popular in fashion and art from as early as 1915. Camouflage patterns have appeared in the work of artists such as Andy Warhol and Ian Hamilton Finlay, sometimes with an anti-war message. In fashion, many major designers have exploited camouflage's style and symbolism, and military clothing or imitations of it have been used both as street wear and as a symbol of political protest.

== Principles ==
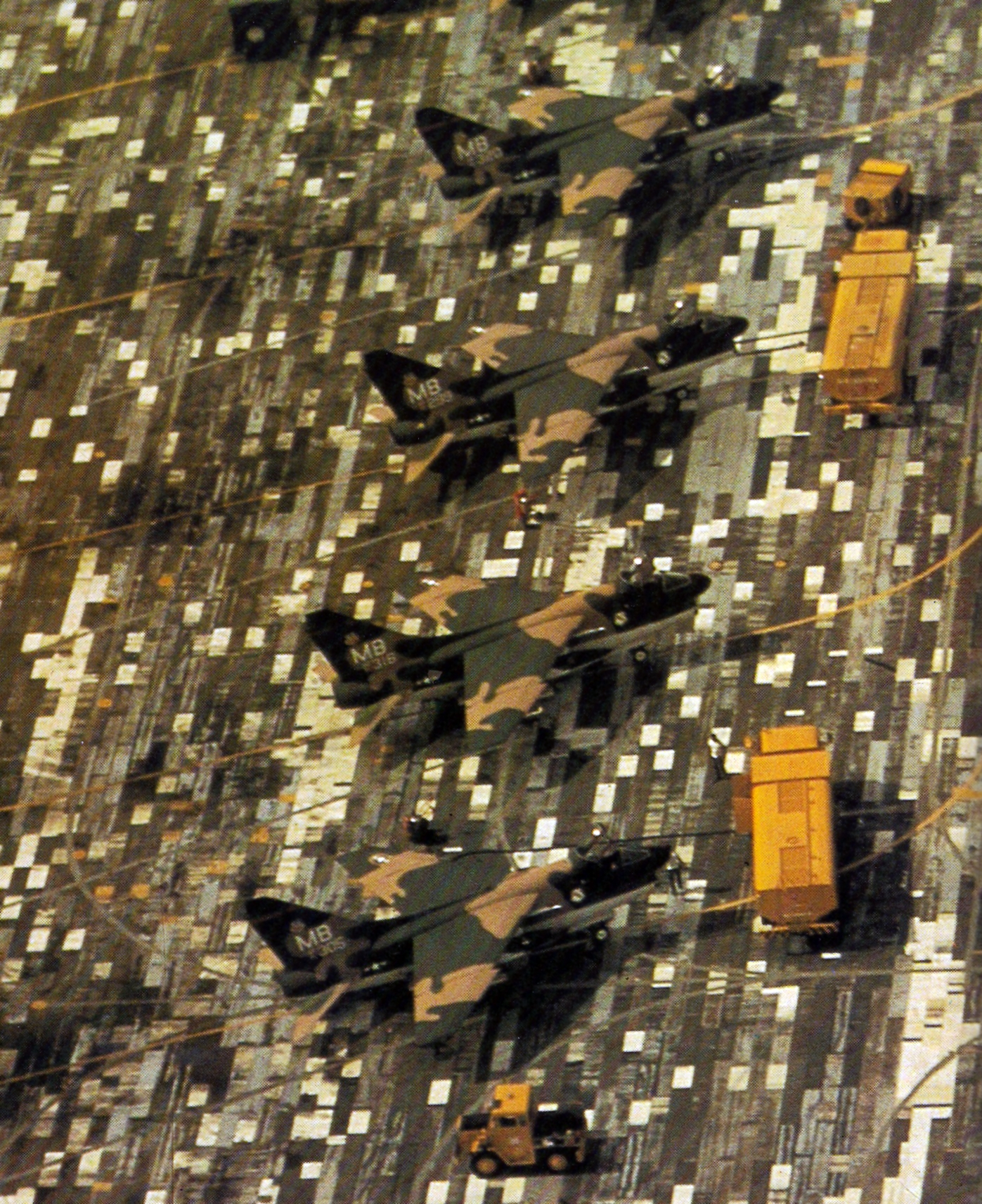
A-7D Corsairs in a disruptive pattern, countershaded with white, on a disruptively painted surface, Thailand, 1972

Military camouflage is part of the art of military deception. The main objective of military camouflage is to deceive the enemy as to the presence, position and intentions of military formations. Camouflage techniques include concealment, disguise, and dummies, applied to troops, vehicles, and positions.

Vision is the main sense of orientation in humans, and the primary function of camouflage is to deceive the human eye. Camouflage works through concealment (whether by countershading, preventing casting shadows, or disruption of outlines), mimicry, or possibly by dazzle. In modern warfare, some forms of camouflage, for example face paints, also offer concealment from infrared sensors, while CADPAT textiles in addition help to provide concealment from radar.

=== Compromises ===
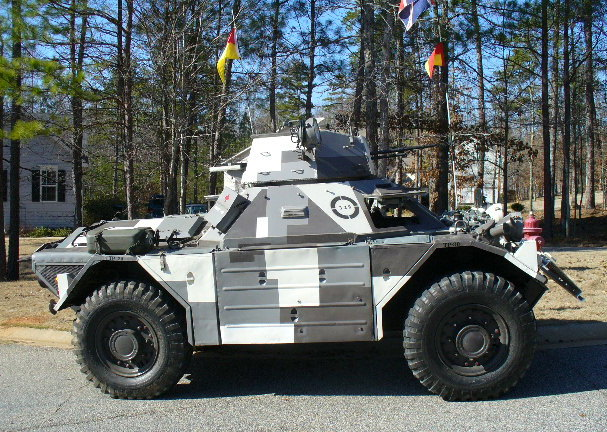
A Ferret armoured car with "Berlin camouflage" meant to hide it against that city's concrete buildings. Such terrain-specific patterns are rare.

While camouflage tricks are in principle limitless, both cost and practical considerations limit the choice of methods and the time and effort devoted to camouflage. Paint and uniforms must also protect vehicles and soldiers from the elements. Units need to move, fire their weapons and perform other tasks to keep functional, some of which run counter to camouflage. Camouflage may be dropped altogether. Late in the Second World War, the USAAF abandoned camouflage paint for some aircraft to lure enemy fighters to attack, while in the Cold War, some aircraft similarly flew with polished metal skins, to reduce drag and weight, or to reduce vulnerability to radiation from nuclear weapons.

No single camouflage pattern is effective in all terrains. The effectiveness of a pattern depends on contrast as well as colour tones. Strong contrasts which disrupt outlines are better suited for environments such as forests where the play of light and shade is prominent, while low contrasts are better suited to open terrain with little shading structure. Terrain-specific camouflage patterns, made to match the local terrain, may be more effective in that terrain than more general patterns. However, unlike an animal or a civilian hunter, military units may need to cross several terrain types like woodland, farmland and built up areas in a single day. While civilian hunting clothing may have almost photo-realistic depictions of tree bark or leaves (indeed, some such patterns are based on photographs), military camouflage is designed to work in a range of environments. With the cost of uniforms in particular being substantial, most armies operating globally have two separate full uniforms, one for woodland/jungle and one for desert and other dry terrain. An American attempt at a global camouflage pattern for all environments (the 2004 UCP) was produced, however after a few years of service it was withdrawn due to poor performance. On the other end of the scale are terrain specific patterns like the "Berlin camo", applied to British vehicles operating in Berlin during the Cold War, where square fields of various gray shades was designed to hide vehicles against the mostly concrete architecture of post-war Berlin.

=== Other functions ===
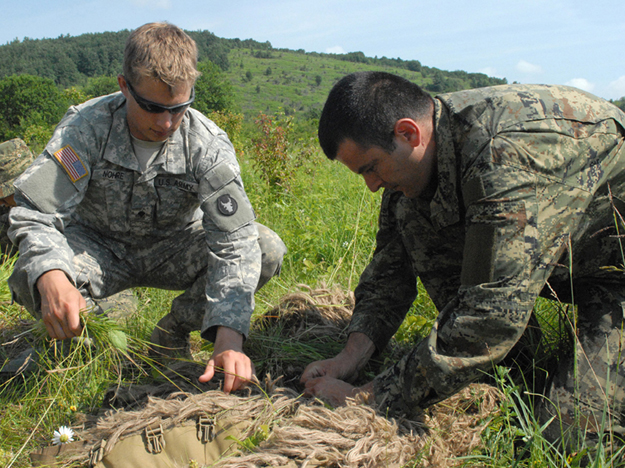
Croatian army uniform (right) had by 2008 diverged from the former Yugoslavian army pattern, apparently for cultural reasons such as political identification.

Camouflage patterns serve cultural functions alongside concealment. Apart from concealment, uniforms are also the primary means for soldiers to tell friends and enemies apart. The camouflage experts and evolutionary zoologists L. Talas, R. J. Baddeley and Innes Cuthill analyzed calibrated photographs of a series of NATO and Warsaw Pact uniform patterns and demonstrated that their evolution did not serve any known principles of military camouflage intended to provide concealment. Instead, when the Warsaw Pact was dissolved, the uniforms of the countries that began to favour the West politically started to converge on the colours and textures of NATO patterns. After the death of Marshal Tito and the breakup of what had been Yugoslavia, the camouflage patterns of the new nations changed, coming to resemble the camouflage patterns used by the armies of their neighbours. The authors note that military camouflage resembles animal coloration in having multiple simultaneous functions.

=== Snow camouflage ===
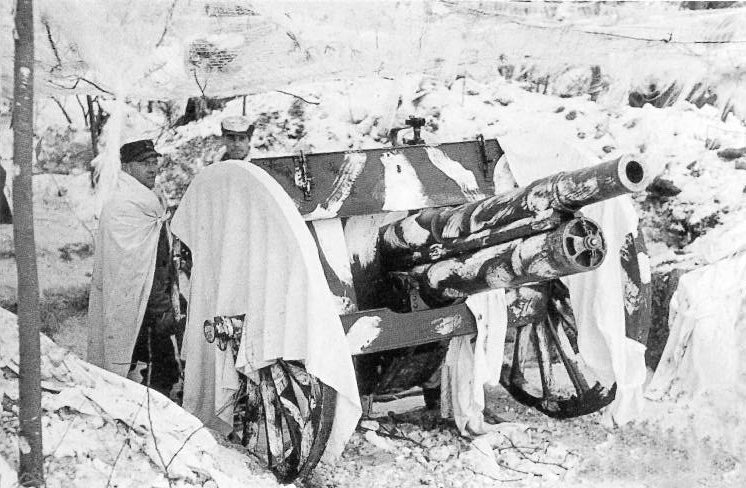
Finnish field gun during the Winter War, showing improvised snow camouflage made from bedsheets and whitewash

Seasons may play a role in some regions. A dramatic change in colour and texture is created by seasonal snowy conditions in northern latitudes, necessitating repainting of vehicles and separate snow oversuits. The Eastern and northern European countries have a tradition for separate winter uniforms rather than oversuits. During the Second World War, the Waffen-SS went a step further, developing reversible uniforms with separate schemes for summer and autumn, as well as white winter oversuits.

=== Movement ===
While patterns can provide more effective crypsis than solid colour when the camouflaged object is stationary, any pattern, particularly one with high contrast, stands out when the object is moving. Jungle camouflage uniforms were issued during the Second World War, but both the British and American forces found that a simple green uniform provided better camouflage when soldiers were moving. After the war, most nations returned to a unicoloured uniform for their troops. Some nations, notably Austria and Israel, continue to use solid colour combat uniforms today. Similarly, while larger military aircraft traditionally had a disruptive pattern with a darker top over a lighter lower surface (a form of countershading), modern fast fighter aircraft often wear gray overall.

=== Digital camouflage ===
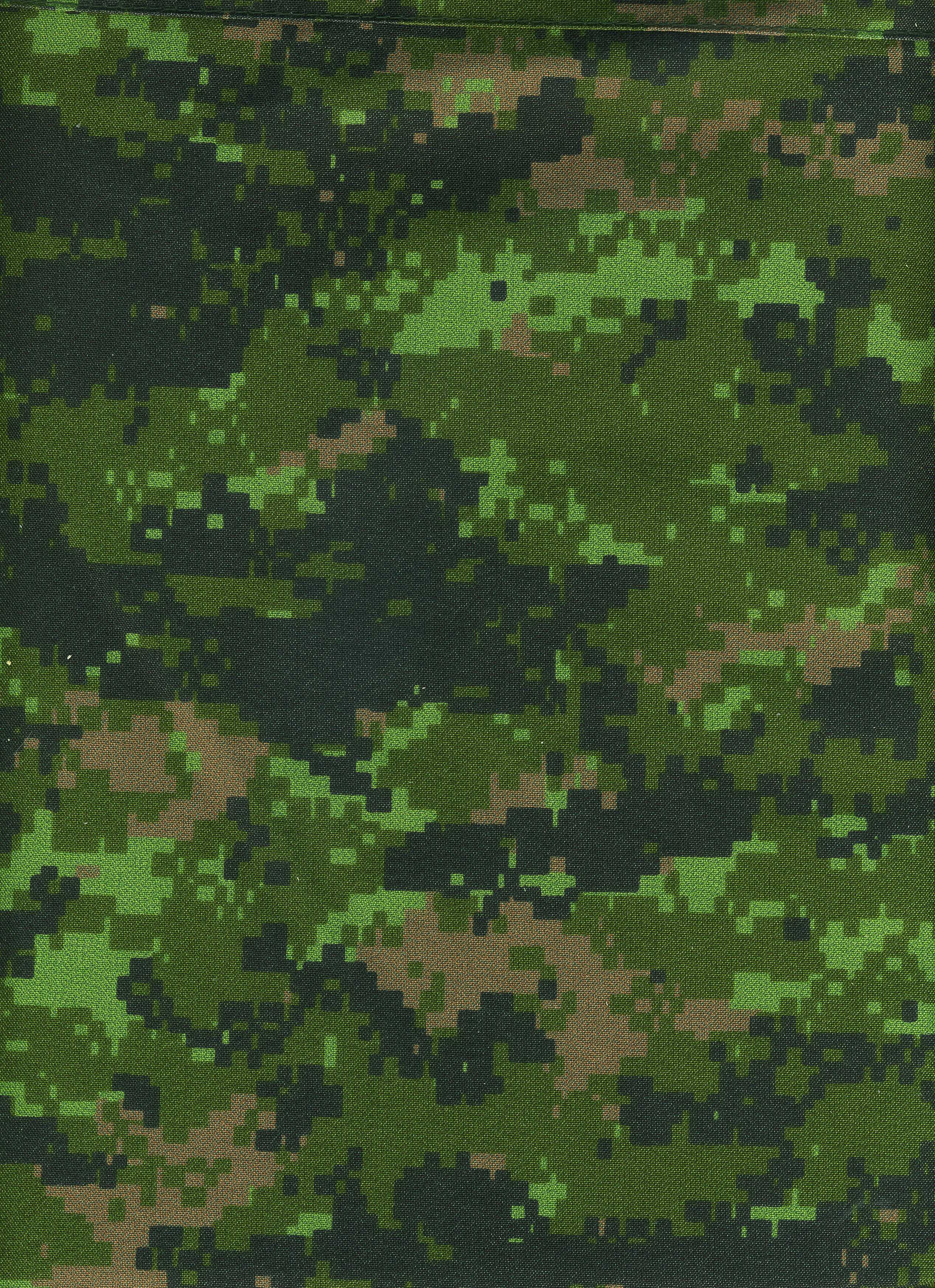
The Canadian Forces were the first army to issue pixellated digital camouflage for all units with their disruptively patterned CADPAT.

Digital camouflage provides a disruptive effect through the use of pixellated patterns at a range of scales, meaning that the camouflage helps to defeat observation at a range of distances. Such patterns were first developed during the Second World War, when Johann Georg Otto Schick designed a number of patterns for the Waffen-SS, combining micro- and macro-patterns in one scheme. The German Army developed the idea further in the 1970s into Flecktarn, which combines smaller shapes with dithering; this softens the edges of the large scale pattern, making the underlying objects harder to discern. Pixellated shapes pre-date computer aided design by many years, already being used in Soviet Union experiments with camouflage patterns, such as "TTsMKK" (Note: TTsMKK is short for "TryokhTsvetniy Maskirovochniy Kamuflirovanniy Kombinezon", three colour disguise camouflage overalls.) developed in 1944 or 1945.

In the 1970s, US Army officer Timothy R. O'Neill suggested that patterns consisting of square blocks of colour would provide effective camouflage. By 2000, O'Neill's idea was combined with patterns like the German Flecktarn to create pixellated patterns such as CADPAT and MARPAT. Battledress in digital camouflage patterns was first designed by the Canadian Forces. The "digital" refers to the coordinates of the pattern, which are digitally defined. The term is also used of computer generated patterns like the non-pixellated Multicam and the Italian fractal Vegetato pattern. Pixellation does not in itself contribute to the camouflaging effect. The pixellated style, however, simplifies design and eases printing on fabric.

=== Non-visual ===
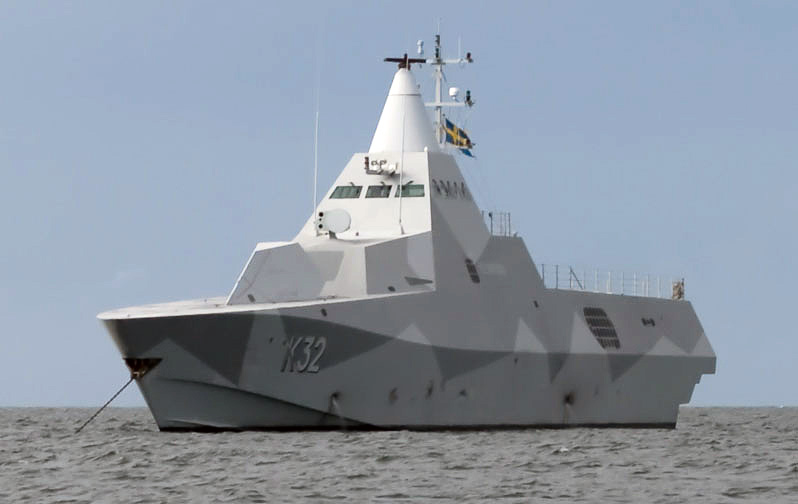
A Swedish Visby class corvette, exhibiting both conventional visual camouflage and an anti-radar (stealth) design

With the birth of radar and sonar and other means of detecting military hardware not depending on the human eye, came means of camouflaging against them. Collectively these are known as stealth technology. Aircraft and ships can be shaped to reflect radar impulses away from the sender, and covered with radar-absorbing materials, to reduce their radar signature. The use of heat-seeking missiles has also led to efforts to hide the heat signature of aircraft engines. Methods include exhaust ports shaped to mix hot exhaust gases with cold surrounding air, and placing the exhaust ports on the upper side of the airframe.

Multi-spectral camouflage attempts to hide objects from several detection methods such as infrared, radar, ultraviolet, and millimetre-wave imaging simultaneously. As of 2018, multiple countries are phasing out legacy camouflage systems with multi-spectral systems.

Auditory camouflage, at least in the form of noise reduction, is practised in various ways. The rubberized hull of military submarines absorbs sonar waves and can be seen as a form of auditory camouflage. Some modern helicopters are designed to be quiet. Combat uniforms are usually equipped with buttons rather than snap fasteners or velcro to reduce noise.

Olfactory camouflage is said to be rare; examples include ghillie suits, special garments for military snipers made from strips of hessian cloth, which are sometimes treated with mud and even manure to give them an "earthy" smell to cover the smell of the sniper.

Magnetic camouflage in the form of "degaussing" coils has been used since the Second World War to protect ships from magnetic mines and other weapons with magnetic sensors. Horizontal coils around the whole or parts of the ship generate magnetic fields to "cancel out" distortions to the Earth's magnetic field created by the ship.

== History ==
=== Reconnaissance and riflemen ===
Ship camouflage was occasionally used in ancient times. Vegetius wrote in the 4th century that "Venetian blue" (bluish-green, like the sea) was used for camouflage in the years 56–54 BC during the Gallic Wars, when Julius Caesar sent his scout ships to gather intelligence along the coast of Britain. The bluish-green scout ships carried sailors and marines dressed in the same colour. In the Mughal Empire that ruled South Asia between the 16th and 18th centuries, the Mughal army frequently employed the use of camouflage in their military campaigns, foreshadowing the modern use of military camouflage in the 19th and 20th centuries.

The emphasis on hand-to-hand combat, and the short range of weapons such as the musket, meant that recognition and cohesion were more important than camouflage in combat clothing well into the baroque period. The introduction of infantry weapons with longer range, especially the Baker rifle, opened up new roles which needed camouflaged clothing. In the colonial Seven Years' War (1756–1763), the rifle-armed Rogers' Rangers wore gray or green uniforms. John Graves Simcoe, one of the unit's later commanders, noted in 1784:

Green is without comparison the best colour for light troops with dark accouterments; and if put on in the spring, by autumn it nearly fades with the leaves, preserving its characteristic of being scarcely discernible at a distance.

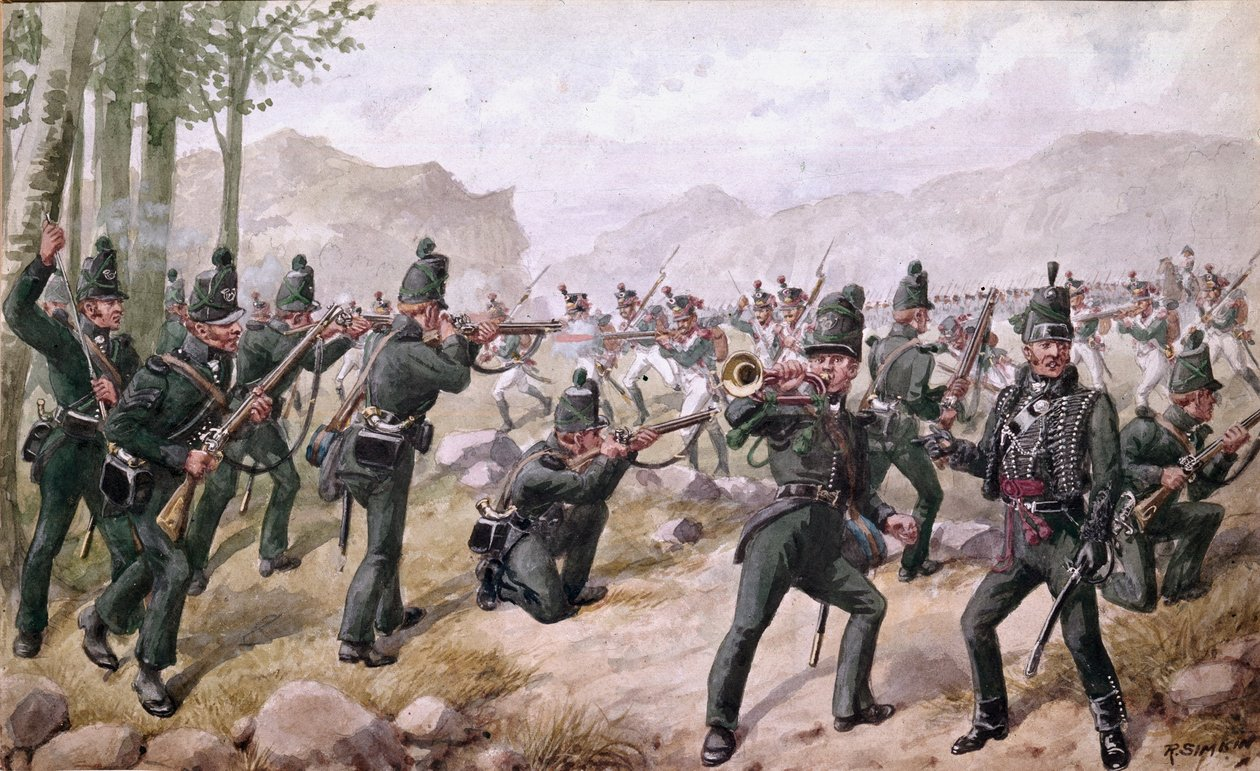
The 95th Rifles wearing green uniforms at the 1813 Battle of the Pyrenees

The tradition was continued by British Rifle Regiments who adopted rifle green for the Napoleonic Wars.

During the Peninsular War, Portugal fielded light infantry units known as Caçadores, who wore brown-jackets which helped conceal them. The brown color was considered to be more adequate for a concealment in the landscape of most of Portuguese regions, in general more arid than the greener landscapes of Central and Northern Europe.

The first introduction of drab general uniform was by the British Corps of Guides in India in 1848. Initially the drab uniform was specially imported from England, with one of the reasons being to "make them invisible in a land of dust". This type of drab uniform, initially for cavalry, became known by 1857 as khaki (Urdu for dust). The example was followed by other British units during the mutiny of 1857, dying their white drill uniforms to inconspicuous tones with mud, tea, coffee or coloured inks. The resulting hue varied from dark or slate grey through light brown to off-white, or sometimes even lavender. This improvised measure gradually became widespread among the troops stationed in India and North-West Frontier, and sometimes among the troops campaigning on the African continent.

=== Rifle fire ===
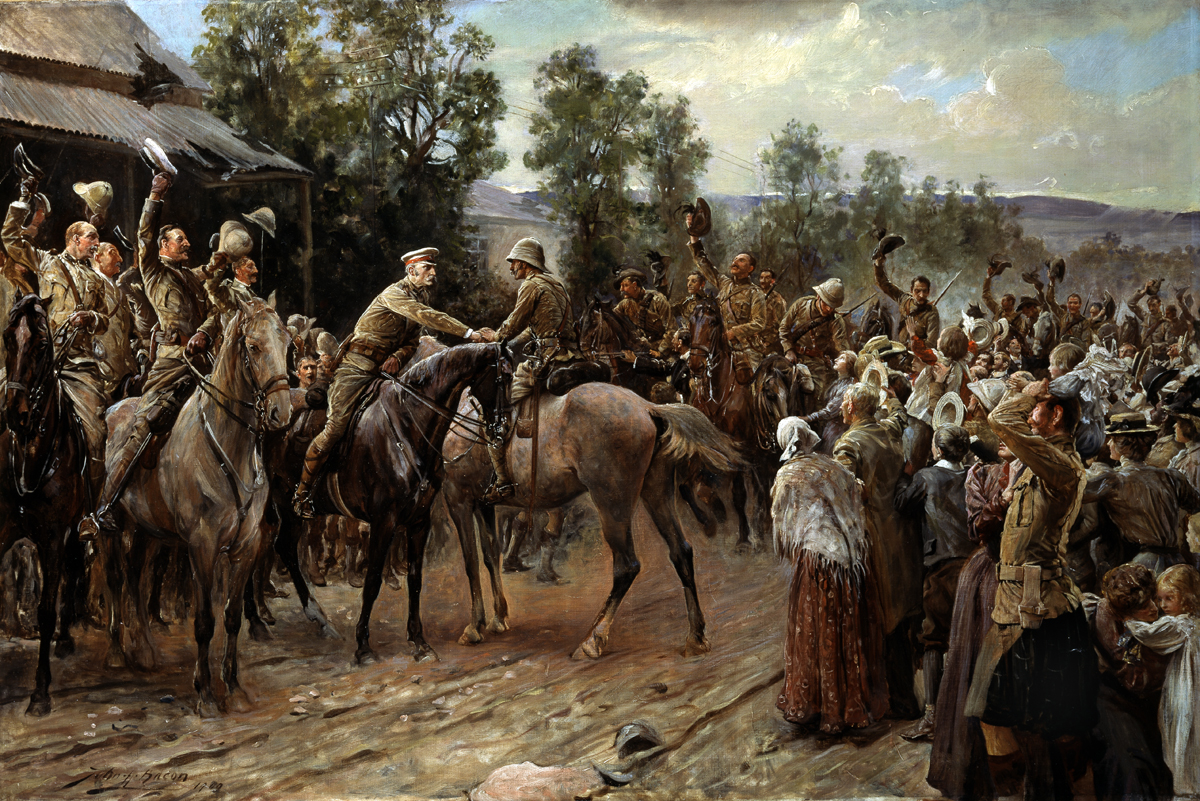
British troops wearing khaki uniforms at the relief of Ladysmith. The Relief of Ladysmith by John Henry Frederick Bacon

While long range rifles became the standard weapon in the 1830s, armies were slow to adapt their tactics and uniforms, perhaps as a result of mainly fighting colonial wars against less well armed opponents. Not until the First Boer War of 1880/81 did a major European power meet an opponent well equipped with and well versed in the use of modern long range repeating firearms, forcing an immediate change in tactics and uniforms. Khaki-coloured uniform became standard service dress for both British and British Indian Army troops stationed in British India in 1885, and in 1896 khaki drill uniform was adopted by British Army for the service outside of Europe in general, but not until the Second Boer War, in 1902, did the entire British Army standardise on khaki (officially known as "drab") for Service Dress.

The US military, who had blue-jacketed rifle units in the Civil War, were quick to follow the British, going khaki in the same year. Russia followed, partially, in 1908. The Italian Army used grigio-verde ("grey-green") in the Alps from 1906 and across the army from 1909. The Germans adopted feldgrau ("field grey") in 1910. By the outbreak of the First World War in 1914, France was the only major power to still field soldiers dressed in traditional conspicuous uniforms.

=== The First World War ===
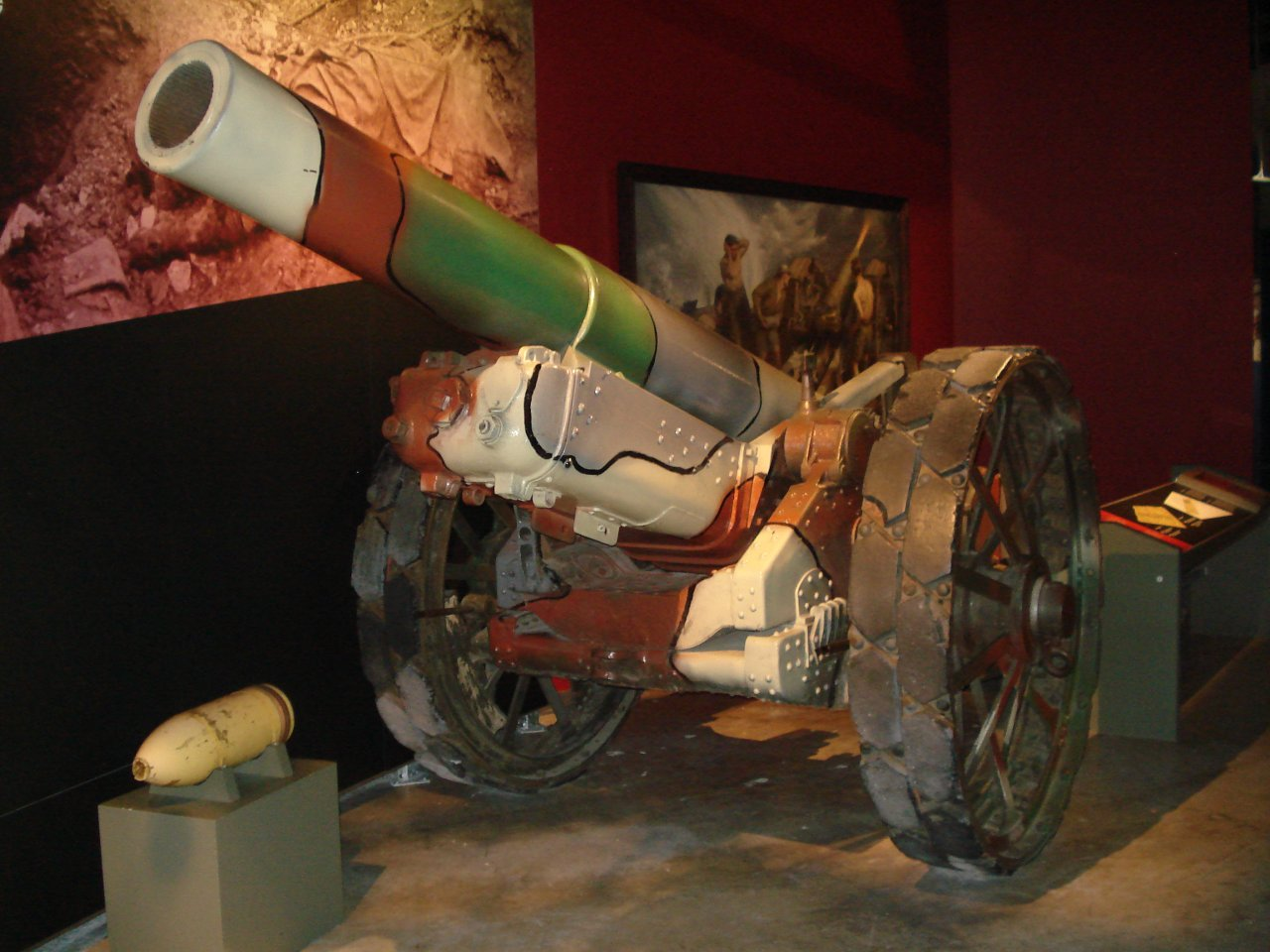
Restored British 8 inch howitzer in WWI pattern, in disruptive camouflage

The First World War was the first full scale industrial conflict fought with modern firearms. The first attempt at disruptive camouflaged garment for the French army was proposed in 1914 by the painter Louis Guingot, but was refused by the army, which nevertheless kept a sample of the clothing. In collaboration with a Russian chemist friend, Guingot had developed a process of painting on weather-resistant fabric before the war and had registered a patent for it. But the casualty rate on the Western Front forced the French to finally relinquish their blue coats and red trousers, adopting a grayish "horizon blue" uniform.

The use of rapid firing machine guns and long range breech loading artillery quickly led to camouflaging of vehicles and positions. Artillery pieces were soon painted in contrasting bold colours to obscure their outlines. Another early trend was building observation trees, made of steel with bark camouflage. Such trees became popular with the British and French armies in 1916. The observation tree was invented by French painter Lucien-Victor Guirand de Scévola, who led the French army's camouflage unit, the first of its kind in any army. He also invented painted canvas netting to hide machine gun positions, and this was quickly taken up for hiding equipment and gun positions from 1917, 7 million square yards being used by the end of the war.

The First World War also saw the birth of aerial warfare, and with it the need not only to conceal positions and vehicles from being spotted from the air, but also the need to camouflage the aircraft themselves. In 1917, Germany started using a lozenge camouflage covering Central Powers aircraft, possibly the earliest printed camouflage. A similarly disruptive splinter pattern in earth tones, Buntfarbenanstrich 1918, was introduced for tanks in 1918, and was also used on the Stahlhelm (steel helmet), becoming the first use of a standardized camouflage pattern for soldiers.

=== Camoufleurs ===
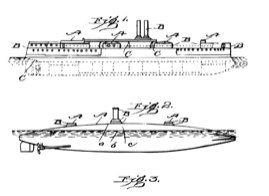
Abbott Thayer's drawings in his 1902 patent for countershading ships

In 1909 an American artist and amateur zoologist, Abbott Thayer published a book, Concealing-Coloration in the Animal Kingdom, which was widely read by military leaders, although his advocacy of countershading was unsuccessful, despite his patent for countershading submarines and surface ships.

The earliest camouflage artists were members of the Post- Impressionist and Fauve schools of France. Contemporary artistic movements such as cubism, vorticism and impressionism also influenced the development of camouflage as they dealt with disrupting outlines, abstraction and colour theory.The French established a Section de Camouflage (Camouflage Department) at Amiens in 1915, headed by Lucien-Victor Guirand de Scévola. His camoufleurs included the artists Jacques Villon, André Dunoyer de Segonzac, Charles Camoin and André Mare.

Camouflage schemes of the First World War and Interwar periods that employed dazzle patterns were often described as "cubist" by commentators, and Picasso claimed with typical hyperbole "Yes, it is we who made it, that is cubism". Most of the artists employed as camoufleurs were traditional representative painters, not cubists, but de Scévola claimed "In order to deform totally the aspect of the object, I had to employ the means that cubists use to represent it."

Other countries soon saw the advantage of camouflage, and established their own units of artists, designers and architects. The British established a Camouflage Section in late 1916 at Wimereux, and the U.S. followed suit with the New York Camouflage Society in April 1917, the official Company A of 40th Engineers in January 1918 and the Women's Reserve Camouflage Corps. The Italians set up the Laboratorio di mascheramento in 1917. By 1918 de Scévola was in command of camouflage workshops with over 9,000 workers, not counting the camoufleurs working at the front itself. Norman Wilkinson who first proposed dazzle camouflage to the British military employed 5 male designers and 11 women artists, who by the end of the war had painted more than 2,300 vessels. The technique utilized trompe l'oeil painting the sides of ships with geometric patterns of different shapes and sizes making it difficult to estimate ship size and direction of travel when seen at a distance. French women were employed behind the lines of both the British and American armies, sewing netting to disguise equipment and designing apparel for soldiers to wear.

=== From the Second World War ===
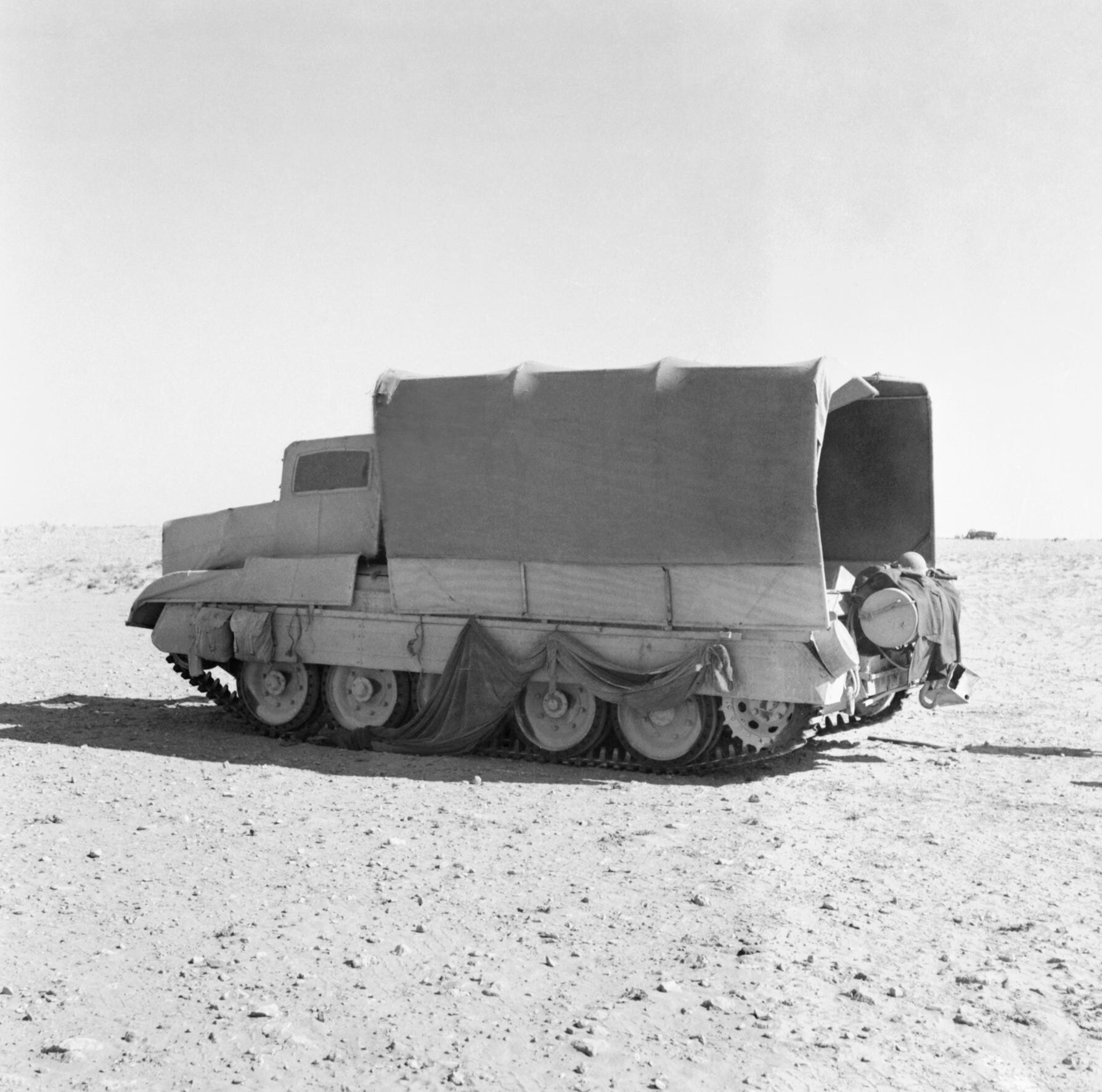
Camouflage in the empty desert: a Crusader tank masquerading as a truck in Operation Bertram

Printed camouflage for shelter halves was introduced for the Italian and German armies in the interwar period, the "splotchy" M1929 Telo mimetico in Italy and the angular Splittermuster 31 in Germany. During the War, both patterns were used for paratrooper uniforms for their respective countries. The British soon followed suit with a brush-stroke type pattern for their paratroopers' Denison smock, and the Soviets introduced an "amoeba" pattern overgarment for their snipers.

Hugh Cott's 1940 book Adaptive Coloration in Animals systematically covered the different forms of camouflage and mimicry by which animals protect themselves, and explicitly drew comparisons throughout with military camouflage:

The principle is one with many applications to modern warfare. In the Great War it was utilized by the Germans when they introduced strongly marked incidents of white or black tone to conceal the fainter contrasts of tone made by the sloping sides of overhead camouflage-screens, or roofing, as seen from the air. The same principle has, of course, a special application in any attempt to reduce the visibility of large objects of all kinds, such as ships, tanks, buildings, and aerodromes.

— Hugh Cott

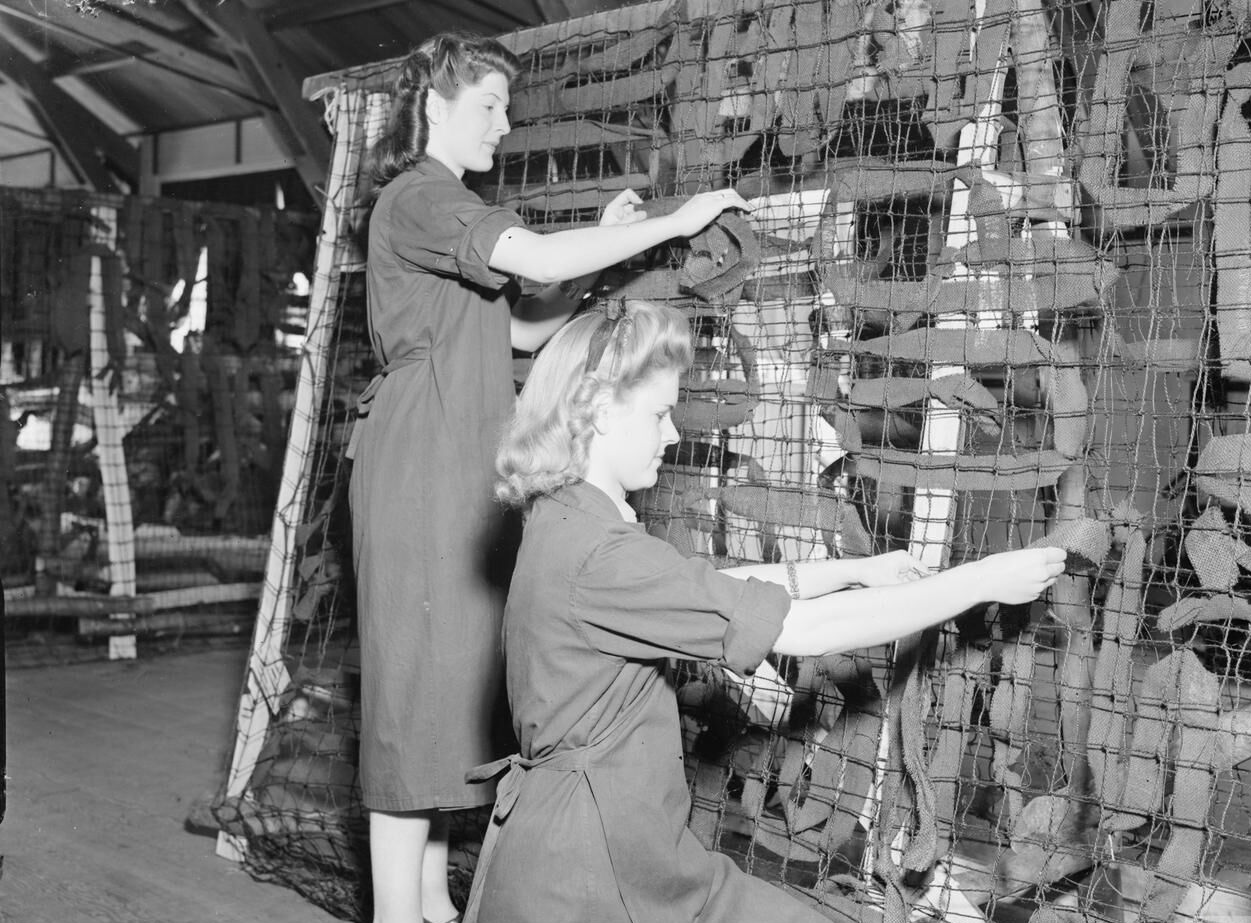
Workers dressing camouflage nets, Britain, 1943

Both British and Soviet aircraft were given wave-type camouflage paintwork for their upper surfaces throughout the war, while American ones remained simple two-colour schemes (different upper and under sides) or even dispensed with camouflage altogether. Italian and some Japanese aircraft wore sprayed-on spotted patterns. German aircraft mostly used an angular splint-pattern camouflage, but Germany experimented with different schemes, particularly in the later stages of the war. They also experimented with various spray-on camouflage patterns for tanks and other vehicles, while Allied vehicles remained largely uni-coloured. As they had volunteered in the first World War, women sewed camouflage netting, organizing formalized groups for the work in Australia, Britain, New Zealand and the United States who took part as camoufleurs during the second war.

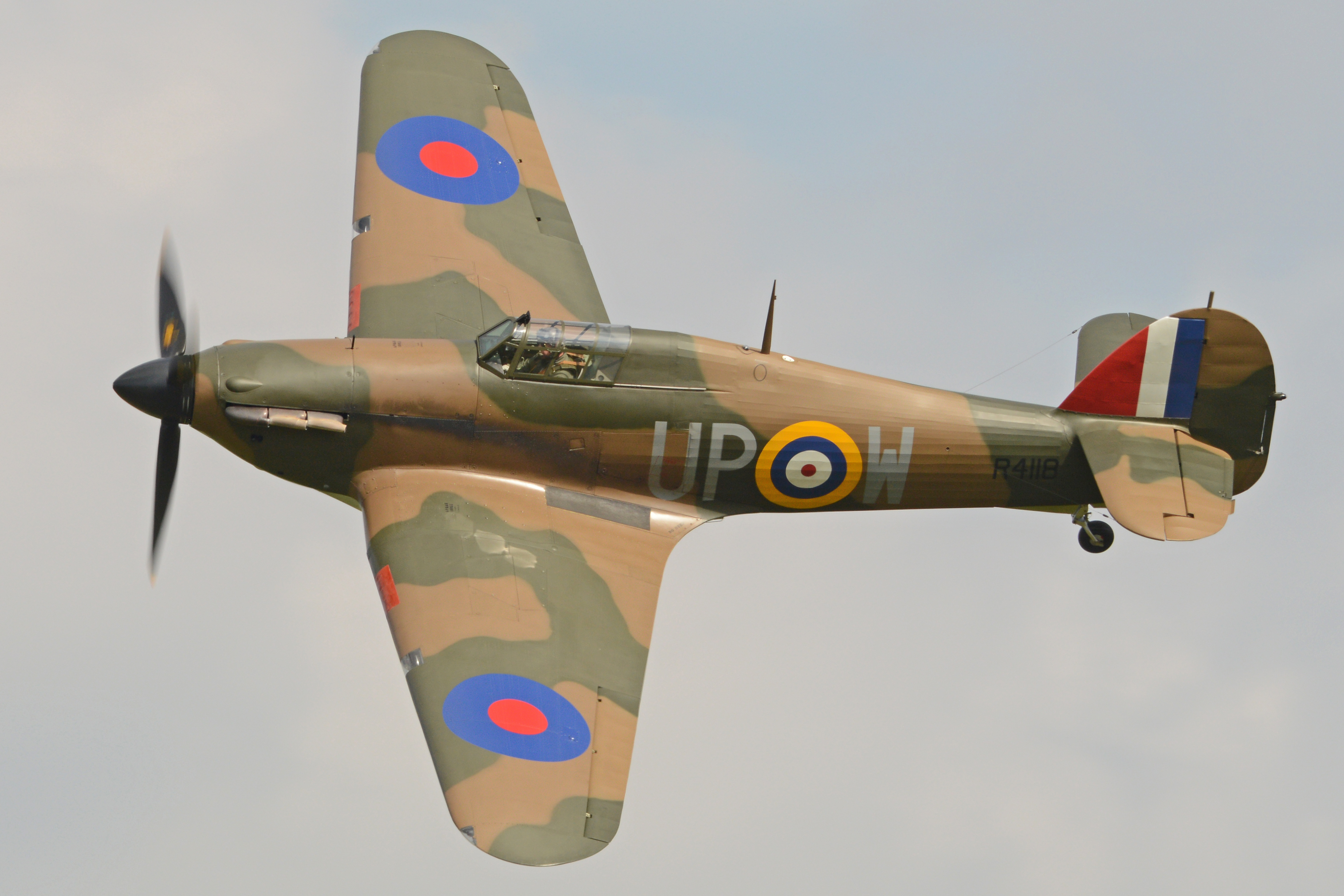
A British Hawker Hurricane in brown and green "temperate land" scheme

The British Middle East Command Camouflage Directorate, consisting mainly of artists recruited into the Royal Engineers, developed the use of camouflage for large-scale military deception. Operations combined the disguise of actual installations, vehicles and stores with the simultaneous display of dummies, whether to draw fire or to give a false idea of the strength of forces or likely attack directions. In Operation Bertram for the decisive battle at El Alamein, a whole dummy armoured division was constructed, while real tanks were disguised as soft-skinned transport using "Sunshield" covers. The capabilities so developed were put to use not only in the western desert, but also in Europe as in the Operation Bodyguard deception for the Invasion of Normandy, and in the Pacific campaign, as in the Battle of Goodenough Island.

The introduction of strategic bombing led to efforts to camouflage airfields and strategic production centres. This form of positional camouflage could be quite elaborate, and even include false houses and cars. With the threat from nuclear weapons in the post-war era such elaborate camouflage was no longer seen as useful, as a direct hit would not be necessary with strategic nuclear weapons to destroy infrastructure. The Soviet Union's doctrine of military deception defines the need for surprise through means including camouflage, based on experiences such as the Battle of Kursk where camouflage helped the Red Army to overwhelm a powerful enemy.

== Application ==
=== Uniforms ===
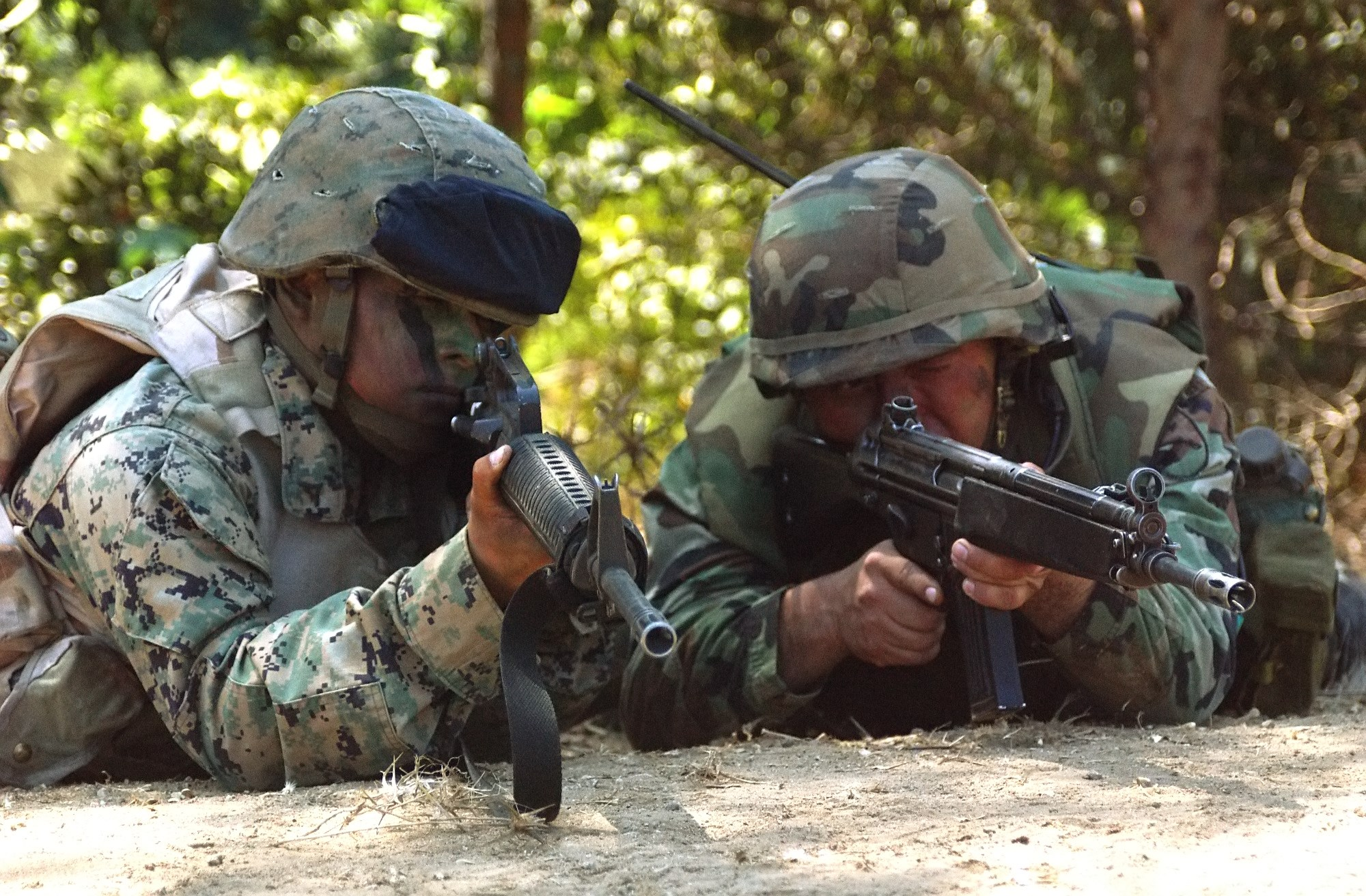
U.S. Marine wearing newer digital pattern and Chilean Marine wearing older woodland pattern

The role of uniform is not only to hide each soldier, but also to identify friend from foe. Issue of the "Frogskin" uniforms to US troops in Europe during the Second World War was halted as it was too often mistaken for the disruptively patterned German uniform worn by the Waffen-SS. Camouflage uniforms need to be made and distributed to a large number of soldiers. The design of camouflage uniforms therefore involves a tradeoff between camouflaging effect, recognizability, cost, and manufacturability.

Armies facing service in different theatres may need several different camouflage uniforms. Separate issues of temperate/jungle and desert camouflage uniforms are common. Patterns can to some extent be adapted to different terrains by adding means of fastening pieces of vegetation to the uniform. Helmets often have netting covers; some jackets have small loops for the same purpose. Being able to find appropriate camouflage vegetation or in other ways modify the issued battle uniform to suit the local terrain is an important skill for infantry soldiers.

Countries in boreal climates often need snow camouflage, either by having reversible uniforms or simple overgarments.

SAAB began offering a multi-spectral personal camouflage system in 2005.

=== Land vehicles ===
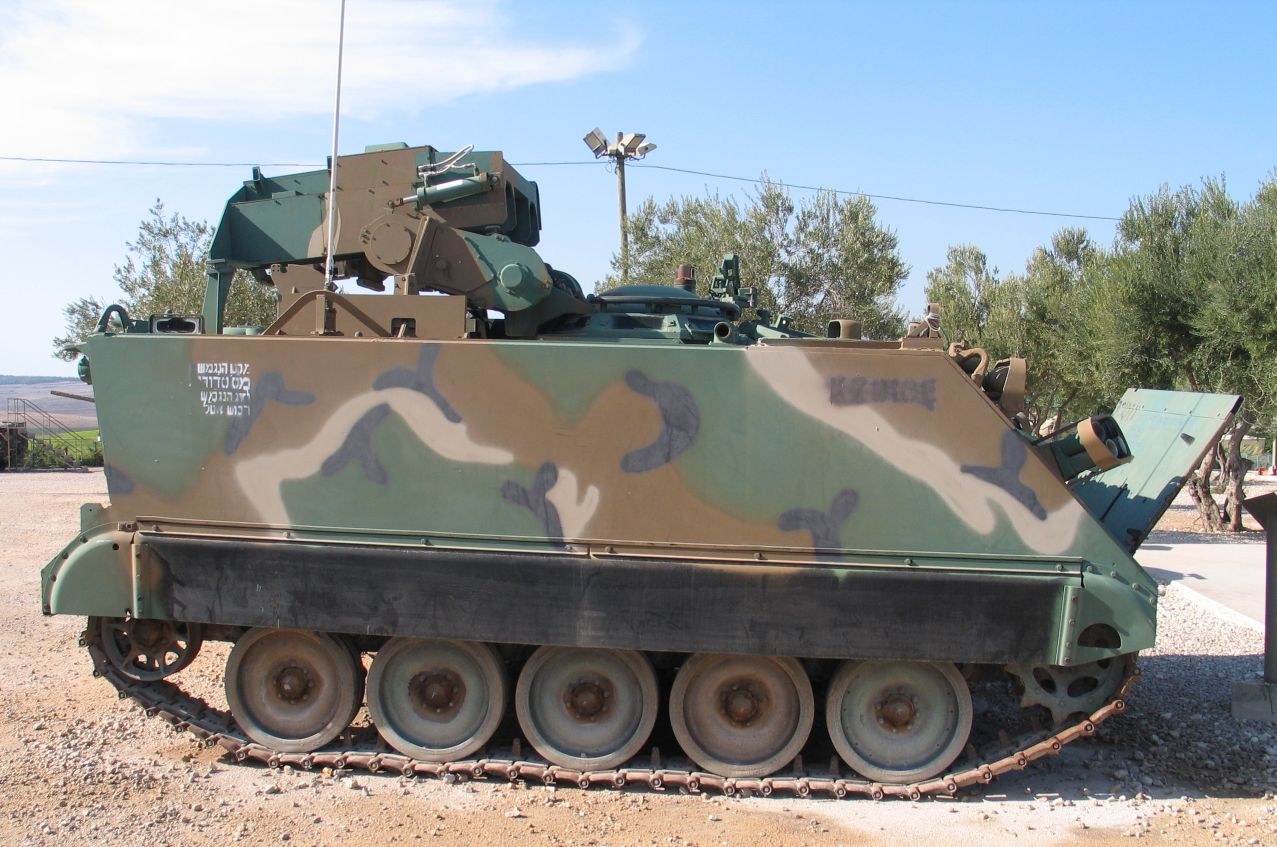
An M901 with MERDC winter verdant camouflage scheme

The purpose of vehicle and equipment camouflage differs from personal camouflage in that the primary threat is aerial reconnaissance. The goal is to disrupt the characteristic shape of the vehicle, to reduce shine, and to make the vehicle difficult to identify even if it is spotted.

Paint is the least effective measure, but forms a basis for other techniques. Military vehicles often become so dirty that pattern-painted camouflage is not visible, and although matte colours reduce shine, a wet vehicle can still be shiny, especially when viewed from above. Patterns are designed to make it more difficult to interpret shadows and shapes. The British Army adopted a disruptive scheme for vehicles operating in the stony desert of the North African Campaign and Greece, retrospectively known as the Caunter scheme. It used up to six colours applied with straight lines.

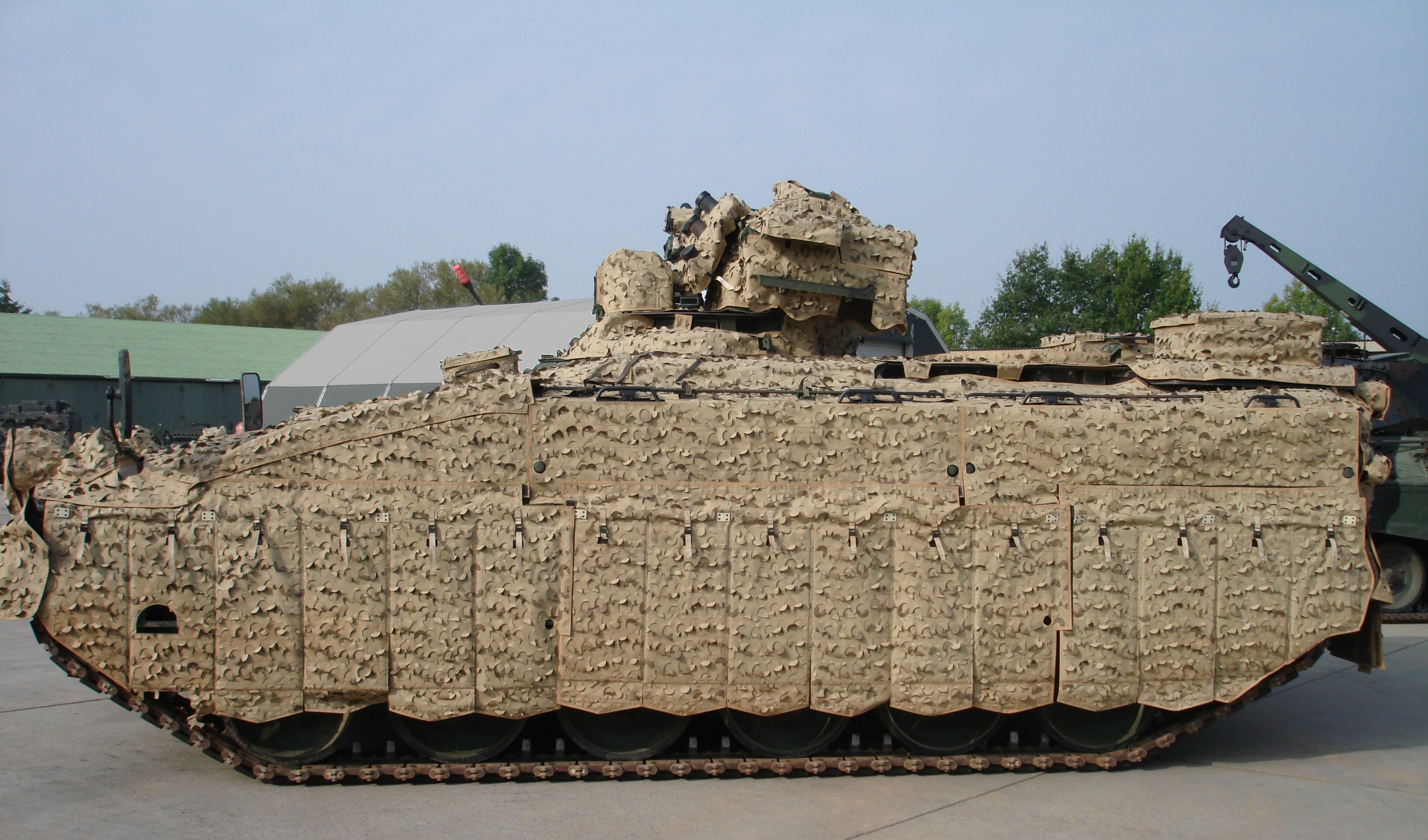
A "multi-spectral" camouflage system fitted to a Marder armoured vehicle reduces visual, infrared and radar "signatures", and permits movement

The British Army's Special Air Service used pink as the primary colour on its desert-camouflaged Land Rover Series IIA patrol vehicles, nicknamed Pink Panthers, as the colour worked well for concealment in that environment.

Nets can be effective at defeating visual observation. Traditional camouflage nets use a textile 'garnish' to generate an apparent texture with a depth of shadow created beneath it, and the effect can be reinforced with pieces of vegetation. Modern nets tend to be made of a continuous woven material, which is easier to deploy over a vehicle and lack the "windows" between patches of garnish of traditional nets. Some nets can remain in place while vehicles move. Simple nets are less effective in defeating radar and thermal sensors. Heavier, more durable "mobile camouflage systems", essentially conformal duvets with thermal and radar properties, provide a degree of concealment without the delay caused by having to spread nets around a vehicle.

Active camouflage for vehicles, using heated or cooled Peltier plates to match the infrared background, has been prototyped in industry but has not yet been put into production.

=== Ships ===
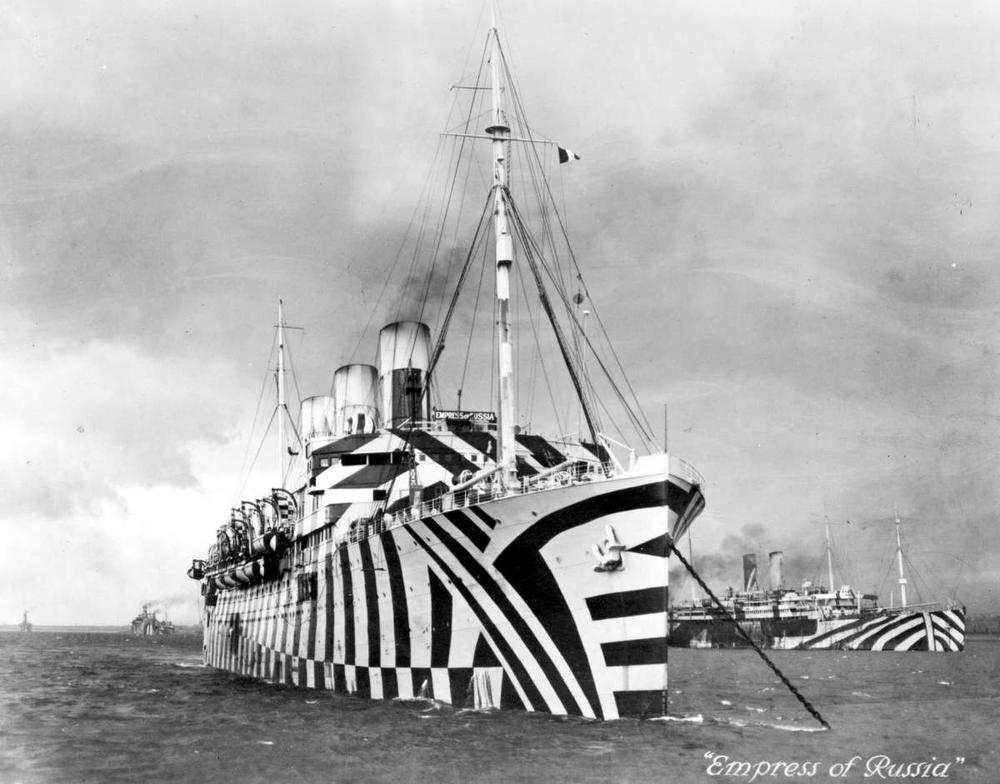
British Admiralty dazzle camouflage of World War I

Until the 20th century, naval weapons had a short range, so camouflage was unimportant for ships, and for the men on board them. Paint schemes were selected on the basis of ease of maintenance or aesthetics, typically buff upperworks (with polished brass fittings) and white or black hulls. Around the start of the 20th century, the increasing range of naval engagements, as demonstrated by the Battle of Tsushima, prompted the introduction of the first camouflage, in the form of some solid shade of gray overall, in the hope that ships would fade into the mist.

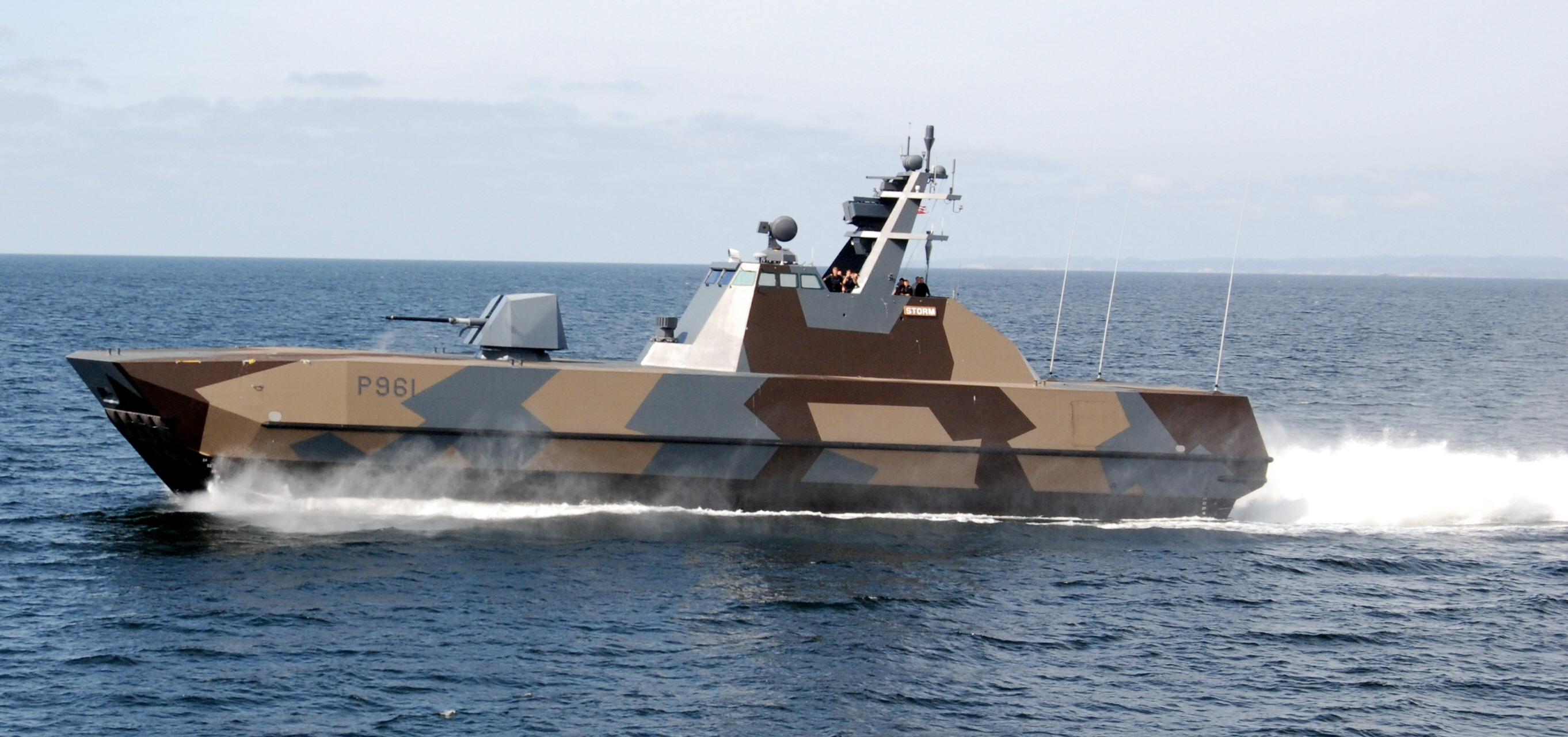
Royal Norwegian Navy Skjold class patrol boat disruptively patterned for service close to the coast

First and Second World War dazzle camouflage, pioneered by English artist Norman Wilkinson, was used not to make ships disappear, but to make them seem smaller or faster, to encourage misidentification by an enemy, and to make the ships harder to hit. In the Second World War, the Royal Canadian Navy trialled a form of active camouflage, counter-illumination, using diffused lighting to prevent ships from appearing as dark shapes against a brighter sky during the night. It reduced visibility by up to 70%, but was unreliable and never went into production.

After the Second World War, the use of radar made camouflage generally less effective. However, camouflage may have helped to protect US warships from Vietnamese shore batteries using optical rangefinders.

Coastal patrol boats such as those of the Norwegian, Swedish and Indonesian navies continue to use terrestrial style disruptively patterned camouflage.

=== Aircraft ===
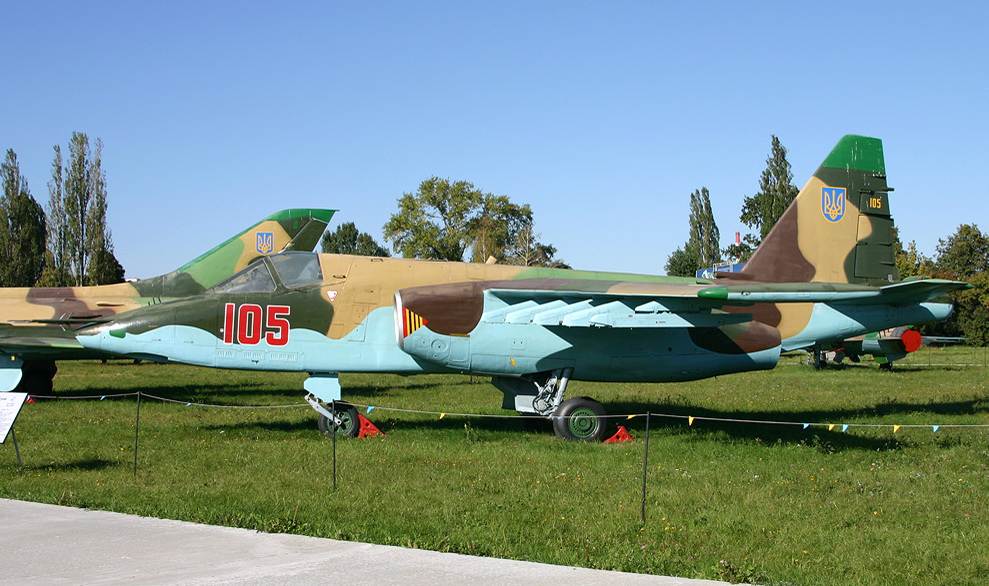
A Ukrainian Su-25 painted with earth colours above and sky blue below

Aircraft camouflage faces the challenge that an aircraft's background varies widely, according to whether the observer is above or below the aircraft, and with the background, e.g. farmland or desert. Aircraft camouflage schemes have often consisted of a light colour underneath and darker colours above. (Note: The dark above, light below camouflage pattern is often called countershading, but its function is not to flatten out shadow as in Thayer's law, but to camouflage against two different backgrounds.)

Other camouflage schemes acknowledge that aircraft may be seen at any angle and against any background while in combat, so aircraft are painted all over with a disruptive pattern or a neutral colour such as gray.

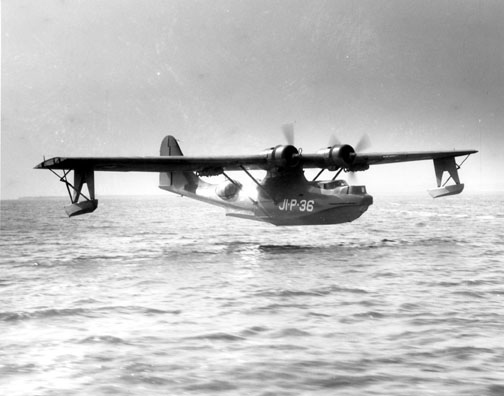
Maritime patrol Catalina is painted white, but even so it appears dark against the sky. Better camouflage would require counter-illumination, which was explored in WWII.

Second World War maritime patrol aircraft such as the Consolidated PBY Catalina flying boat were painted white, as aircraft generally appear dark against the sky (including at night), and hence are least visible when painted in as light a colour as possible. The problem of appearing dark against the sky was explored in the U.S. Navy's Yehudi lights project in 1943, using counter-illumination to raise the average brightness of a plane, when seen head-on, from a dark shape to the same as the sky. The experiments worked, enabling an aircraft to approach to within 2 miles (3.2 km) before being seen, whereas aircraft without the lights were noticed 12 miles (19 km) away.

The higher speeds of modern aircraft, and the reliance on radar and missiles in air combat have reduced the value of visual camouflage, while increasing the value of electronic "stealth" measures. Modern paint is designed to absorb electromagnetic radiation used by radar, reducing the signature of the aircraft, and to limit the emission of infrared light used by heat seeking missiles to detect their target. Further advances in aircraft camouflage are being investigated in the field of active camouflage.

== In fashion and art ==
Postcard of costumes at the 'Dazzle Ball' held by the Chelsea Arts Club, 1919, a peacetime reaction to war.

=== Fashion and the "Dazzle Ball" ===
The transfer of camouflage patterns from battle to exclusively civilian uses is not recent. Dazzle camouflage inspired a trend of dazzlesque patterns used on clothing in England, starting in 1919 with the "Dazzle Ball" held by Chelsea Arts Club. Those attending wore dazzle-patterned black and white clothing, influencing twentieth-century fashion and art via postcards (see illustration) and magazine articles. The Illustrated London News announced

The scheme of decoration for the great fancy dress ball given by the Chelsea Arts Club at the Albert Hall, the other day, was based on the principles of 'Dazzle', the method of 'camouflage' used during the war in the painting of ships ... The total effect was brilliant and fantastic.

=== Camouflage in art ===
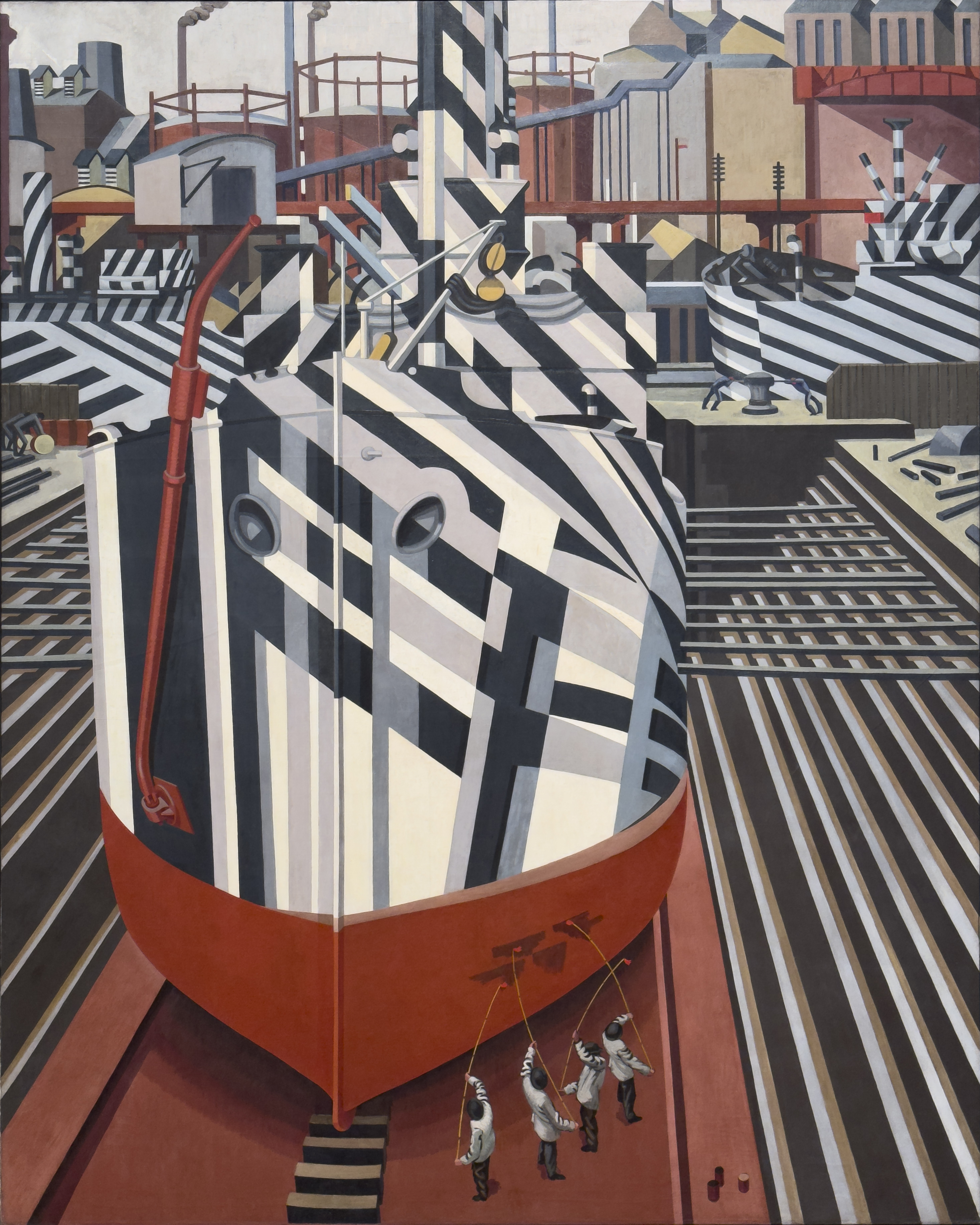
Edward Wadsworth: Dazzle-ships in dry dock at Liverpool, 1919, National Gallery of Canada, Ottawa, Ontario.

While many artists helped to develop camouflage during and since World War I, the disparate sympathies of the two cultures restrained the use of "militaristic" forms other than in the work of war artists. Since the 1960s, several artists have exploited the symbolism of camouflage. For example, Andy Warhol's 1986 camouflage series was his last major work, including Camouflage Self-Portrait. Alain Jacquet created many camouflage works from 1961 to the 1970s. Ian Hamilton Finlay's 1973 Arcadia was a screenprint of a leafily-camouflaged tank, "an ironic parallel between this idea of a natural paradise and the camouflage patterns on a tank", as the Tate Collection describes it. Veruschka, the pseudonym of Vera von Lehndorff and Holger Trülzsch, created "Nature, Signs & Animals" and "Mimicry-Dress-Art" in 1970–1973. Thomas Hirschhorn made Utopia : One World, One War, One Army, One Dress in 2005.

=== War protesters and fashionistas ===
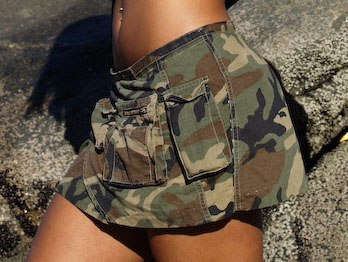
Camouflage patterned skirt as a fashion item

In the US in the 1960s, military clothing became increasingly common (mostly olive drab rather than patterned camouflage); it was often found worn by anti-war protestors, initially within groups such as Vietnam Veterans Against the War but then increasingly widely as a symbol of political protest.

Fashion often uses camouflage as inspiration – attracted by the striking designs, the "patterned disorder" of camouflage, its symbolism (to be celebrated or subverted), and its versatility. Early designers include Marimekko (1960s), Jean-Charles de Castelbajac (1975–), Stephen Sprouse (using Warhol prints, 1987–1988), and Franco Moschino (1986), but it was not until the 1990s that camouflage became a significant and widespread facet of dress from streetwear to high-fashion labels – especially the use of "faux-camouflage". Producers using camouflage in the 1990s and beyond include: John Galliano for Christian Dior, Marc Jacobs for Louis Vuitton, Comme des Garçons, Chanel, Tommy Hilfiger, Dolce & Gabbana, Issey Miyake, Armani, Yves Saint-Laurent.

Companies closely associated with camouflage patterns include 6876, A Bathing Ape, Stone Island, Stüssy, Maharishi, mhi, Zoo York, Addict, and Girbaud, using and overprinting genuine military surplus fabric; others use camouflage patterns in bright colours such as pink or purple. Some, such as Emma Lundgren and Stüssy, have created their own designs or integrated camouflage patterns with other symbols.

=== Restrictions ===
Some countries such as Barbados, Aruba, and other Caribbean nations have laws prohibiting camouflage clothing from being worn by non-military personnel, including tourists and children. Civilian possession of camouflage is still banned in Zimbabwe.

== See also ==
- Camouflage (1944 film), World War II camouflage training film produced by the US Army Air Forces
- List of military clothing camouflage patterns

== Sources ==
- Adams, Henry (March 2011). "Ornithology, Infantry and Abstraction". Art & Antiques. Archived from the original on 31 August 2020.
- Anon (July 1918). "'Camouflage' in War and Nature". Arts & Decoration: 175.
- Anon (22 March 1919). "Illustrated London News". The Great Dazzle Ball at the Albert Hall: The Shower of Bomb Balloons and Some Typical Costumes. No. 154. pp. 414–415.
- Anon (2012). "New Army Combat Uniform". Army News Service. About.com. Archived from the original on 6 September 2015. "Black is no longer useful on the uniform because it is not a color commonly found in nature. The drawback to black is that its color immediately catches the eye, he added"
- Barkas, Geoffrey; Barkas, Natalie (1952). The Camouflage Story (from Aintree to Alamein). Cassell.
- Barthorp, Michael (1988). The British Army on Campaign 1816–1902. Osprey Publishing.
- BBC (21 January 2006). "Degaussing Ships in Falmouth Docks". BBC.
- Behrens, Roy R. (2003). False Colours: Art, Design, and Modern Camouflage. Bobolink Books. ISBN 978-0-9713244-0-4.
- Behrens, Roy R. (Summer 2005). "Art, culture and camouflage". Tate Etc (4). Archived from the original on 21 December 2018.
- Bishop, Chris (2010). Luftwaffe squadrons 1939–45. London: Amber. ISBN 978-1-904687-62-7.
- Blechman, Hardy; Newman, Alex (2004). DPM: Disruptive Pattern Material. DPM. ISBN 0-9543404-0-X.
- Blücher (2013). "Camouflage Net: Multispectral Camouflage Systems". BLÜCHER SYSTEMS.
- "Alighiero Boetti, "Mimetico", 1967". Museo Madre. Archived from the original on 23 November 2012.
- Borsarello, J.F. (1999). Camouflage uniforms of European and NATO armies: 1945 to the present. Atglen, PA: Schiffer Pub. ISBN 0-7643-1018-6.
- Boucher, W. Ira. (2009). "An Illustrated History of World War One". German Lozenge Camouflage. Archived from the original on 15 June 2017.
- Brayley, Martin J. (2009). Camouflage uniforms: international combat dress 1940–2010. Ramsbury: Crowood. ISBN 978-1-84797-137-1.
- Bundesheer (2012). "Die Uniform". Österreichs Bundesheer. Austrian Army (Bundesheer).
- Casey, Hugh J., ed. (1951). "Airfield and Base Development". Engineers of the Southwest Pacific. Washington, D.C.: United States Government Printing Office.
- "Israel". Camopedia. 27 March 2011.
- Casson, Lionel (1995). Ships and Seamanship in the Ancient World. JHU Press. p. 235. ISBN 0-8018-5130-0.
- Chappell, M. (2003). The British Army in World War I (1). Osprey. p. 37.
- Chartrand, René (2013). "Miscellaneous Notes on Rangers". Military Heritage.
- Clark, Lloyd (2011). Kursk: the greatest battle, eastern front 1943. Headline.
- Cott, Hugh B. (1940). Adaptive Coloration in Animals. Methuen.
- Craemer, Guy (2007). "CADPAT or MARPAT Camouflage". Who did it first; Canada or the US?. Hyperstealth.
- Craemer, Guy (2012). "Dual Texture – U.S. Army digital camouflage". United Dynamics.
- Crowdy, Terry (2007). Military Misdemeanors. Bloomsbury USA. p. 149. ISBN 978-1-84603-148-9.
- Danton, Louis (1915). "Cubisme et camouflage - L'Histoire par l'image". histoire-image.org (in French).
- Davies, W. (2012). "Berlin Brigade Urban Paint Scheme". Newsletter. Ex-Military Land Rover Association. Archived from the original on 12 March 2013.
- Davis, Brian L. (1998). German Army uniforms and insignia: 1933–1945. London: Brockhampton Press. ISBN 978-1-86019-869-4.
- Dillon, Ronan (24 February 2011). "Protesters in Camouflage". The Re-Appropriation of Camouflage from military use into civilian clothing. This Greedy Pig.com. Archived from the original on 26 April 2012.
- Dougherty, Martin J. (2017). Camouflage at War: An Illustrated Guide from 1914 to the Present Day. Amber Books. ISBN 978-0-7858-3509-7.
- Douglass, Steve; Sweetman, Bill (1997). "Hiding in Plane Sight: Stealth aircraft own the night. Now they want the day". Popular Science: 54–59.
- Engber, D. (5 July 2012). "Lost in the Wilderness, the military's misadventures in pixellated camouflage". State.
- FAS (12 December 1998). "Degaussing". FAS.
- Ferguson, Gregor (1996). The Paras 1940–1984. Osprey (Reed Consumer Books Ltd.). ISBN 0-85045-573-1.
- Forbes, Peter (2009). Dazzled and Deceived: Mimicry and Camouflage. Yale. ISBN 978-0-300-12539-9.
- Freedberg, S. J. Jr. (25 June 2012). "Army Drops Universal Camouflage After Spending Billions". Aol Defence. Archived from the original on 31 August 2012.
- Galliano (9 September – 16 December 2006). "Love and War: The Weaponized Woman". John Galliano for Christian Dior, silk camouflage evening dress. The Museum at FIT. Archived from the original on 3 September 2006.
- Glantz, David M. (1989). Soviet Military Deception in the Second World War. London: Routledge. ISBN 978-0-7146-3347-3.
- GlobalSecurity (2012). "Stealth Helicopter: MH-X Advanced Special Operations Helicopter". GlobalSecurity.org.
- Greer (1980). Dana Bell; illustrated by Don (eds.). Air Force colors. Carrollton, Texas: Squadron/Signal Publications. ISBN 0-89747-108-3.
- Grimes, William (9 September 2008). "Alain Jacquet, Playful Pop Artist, Dies at 69". New York Times.
- Harris, Tom (2013). "How Stealth Bombers Work". How Stuff Works.
- Haythornthwaite, Philip (2002). British rifleman, 1797–1815. Christa Hook (illus.). Oxford: Osprey. ISBN 1-84176-177-X.
- Katz, Sam (1988). Israeli Elite Units since 1948. United Kingdom: Osprey Publishing. p. 64. ISBN 978-0-85045-837-4.
- Kaempffert, Waldemar (April 1919). "Fighting the U-Boat with Paint: How American and English artists taught sailors to dazzle the U-Boat". Popular Science Monthly. 94 (4). New York City: 17.
- Kennedy, Pagan (10 May 2013). "Who Made That Digital Camouflage?". The New York Times.
- Kitsune (2013). "Norwegian Skjold class Surface Effect Patrol Boat".
- Kopp, C. (November 1989). "Optical Warfare – The New Frontier". Australian Aviation. 1989 (November).
- Krone (2013). "Signature management: passive protection". Krone Technology. Archived from the original on 4 March 2016.
- Lehndorff, Vera; Trülzsch, Holger (2011). "Vera Lehndorff & Holger Trülzsch". (Portfolio of photographs). Veruschka.net. Archived from the original on 26 November 2011.
- Letowski, T.R. (2012). Owning the Environment: Stealth Soldier— Research Outline (PDF). Aberdeen Proving Ground, MD: U.S. Army Research Laboratory. p. 20. Archived from the original on 8 April 2013.
- Lundgren, Emma (2011). "Emma Lundgren: Camouflage". Camouflage (fashion). emmalundgren.com. Archived from the original on 26 April 2012.
- Massimello, Giovanni; Apostolo, Giorgio (2000). Italian aces of World War II (1 ed.). Oxford: Osprey. ISBN 1-84176-078-1.
- Murphy, Robert Cushman (January 1917). "Marine camouflage". The Brooklyn Museum Quarterly. 4–6. Brooklyn Institute of Arts and Sciences: 35–39.
- Myatt, F. (1994). The illustrated encyclopedia of 19th century firearms: an illustrated history of the development of the world's military firearms during the 19th century. New York: Crescent Books. ISBN 0-517-27786-7.
- Newark, Tim (2007). Camouflage. Thames & Hudson.
- Peterson, D. (2001). Waffen-SS Camouflage Uniforms and Post-war Derivatives. Crowood. p. 64. ISBN 978-1-86126-474-9.
- Pilawskii, Erik (2003). Soviet Air Force fighter colours: 1941–1945. Hersham: Classic. ISBN 1-903223-30-X.
- Plaster, John L. (1993). The ultimate sniper: an advanced training manual for military & police snipers. Boulder, Colorado: Paladin Press. ISBN 0-87364-704-1.
- Prinzeugen (2012). "Schnellboot: An Illustrated Technical History". Prinz Eugen. Archived from the original on 19 September 2016.
- Rao, G.A.; Mahulikar, S. P. (2002). "Integrated review of stealth technology and its role in airpower". Aeronautical Journal. 106 (1066): 629–641. doi:10.1017/S0001924000011702. S2CID 108545502.
- Restayn, Jean (2005). Encyclopaedia of AFVs of WWII. Volume 1: Tanks. Paris: Casemate. ISBN 2-915239-47-9.
- Richardson, Doug (2001). Stealth warplanes. Osceola, WI: MBI Pub. Co. ISBN 0-7603-1051-3.
- SAS (2013). "Mobility Troop - SAS Land Rovers".
- Shabbir, Usman (2002). "Highlights from IDEAS 2002". ACIG Special Reports. Air Combat Information Group. Archived from the original on 8 April 2003.
- Shaw, Robert L. (1985). Fighter Combat: Tactics and Maneuvering. Annapolis, Md.: Naval Institute Press. ISBN 0-87021-059-9.
- Showalter, Dennis E. (2004). Tannenberg:clash of empires 1914. Potomac Books. p. 148. ISBN 1-57488-781-5.
- Simcoe, John Graves (1784). A Journal of the Operations of the Queen's Rangers, from the end of the year 1777, to the conclusion of the Late American War. Archived from the original on 12 December 2003.
- Smith, Charles L (Spring 1988). "Soviet Maskirovka". Airpower Journal.
- Starmer, Mike (2005). The Caunter Scheme: British World War Two Camouflage Schemes. Partizan Press.
- Strikehold (2010). "Making Sense of Digital Camouflage". Strike - Hold!. Strikehold. Archived from the original on 30 November 2012.
- Stroud, Rick (2012). The Phantom Army of Alamein: How the Camouflage Unit and Operation Bertram Hoodwinked Rommel. Bloomsbury.
- Stüssy (2012). "Stüssy Camo". Camouflage (fashion). stussy.com. Archived from the original on 18 October 2016.
- Summers, Chris (10 June 2004). "Stealth ships steam ahead". BBC News.
- Sumner, Graham (2003). Roman Military Clothing: AD 200–400. Vol. 2. Osprey Publishing. p. 24. ISBN 1-84176-559-7.
- Sumrall, Robert F. (February 1973). "Ship Camouflage (WWII): Deceptive Art". United States Naval Institute Proceedings: 67–81.
- Talas, Laszlo; Baddeley, Roland J.; Cuthill, Innes C. (2017). "Cultural evolution of military camouflage". Philosophical Transactions of the Royal Society B: Biological Sciences. 372 (1724) 20160351. doi:10.1098/rstb.2016.0351. PMC 5444070. PMID 28533466.
- Tanchelev, Gloria (10 March – 13 May 2006). "Thomas Hirschhorn". Feature: Reviews: Thomas Hirschhorn: Utopia Utopia=One World One War One Army One Dress. Stretcher.org. Archived from the original on 31 March 2016.
- Tate (July 2008). "Ian Hamilton Finlay 1925–2006: Arcadia". Arcadia, 1973. Tate Collection.
- Thorpe, Donald W. (1968). Japanese Army Air Force camouflage and markings, World War II. Translated by Yasuo Oishi. Fallbrook, California: Aero. ISBN 0-8168-6579-5.
- Tinbergen, Niko (1953). The Herring Gull's World. Collins. p. 14. ISBN 0-00-219444-9. "white has proved to be the most efficient concealing coloration for aircraft on anti-submarine patrol"
- US Army (2009). Photosimulation Camouflage Detection Test. Natick, MA: U.S. Army Natick Soldier Research, Development and Engineering Center. p. 27. "Overall, in a woodland environment, the lighter coloured patterns were detected at greater distances than the darker patterns. The opposite was found in desert and urban conditions. These data confirm intuition on environment-specific patterns: woodland patterns perform best in woodland environments, and desert patterns perform best in desert environments."
- von Pivka, Otto (2002). The Portuguese Army of the Napoleonic wars. Michael Roffe (illus.). Oxford: Osprey. ISBN 0-85045-251-1.
- Wade, Lisa (14 April 2010). "Camouflaging Airports and Plants During WWII". Sociological Images. The Society Pages. Archived from the original on 14 June 2012.
- War Department (1944). FM 5-20B Field Manual: Camouflage of Vehicles. U.S. War Department, Corps of Engineers.
- War Department (2013). Field Manual: FM 5-20A: Camouflage of Individuals and Infantry Weapons. United States War Department. Archived from the original on 25 June 2006.
- Warhol, Andy (1986). "Camouflage Self-portrait". Philadelphia Museum of Art.
- Wilkinson, Norman (4 April 1939). "Letter to The Times on Camouflage". The Times. London.
- Zimmerman, Stan (2000). "Silence Makes Perfect". Submarine Technology for the 21st Century (2nd ed.). Victoria, British Columbia: Trafford Publishing. pp. 103–105. ISBN 978-1-55212-330-0.
