= Connaigre Bay Group =

Group of volcanic strata in Newfoundland, Canada

- Stratigraphic range: 629 – 623 Ma
- Type: Group
- Sub-units: Doughball Point Formation

Lithology
- Primary: Volcanics

Location
- Region: Newfoundland
- Country: Canada

The Connaigre Bay Group is an Early Ediacaran group of volcanic strata cropping out in Newfoundland, Canada.
