= Marystown Group =

- Stratigraphic range: 623–550 Ma (approx.)
- Type: Group
- Underlies: Rencontre Formation (sometimes classified in Long Harbour Group)
- Overlies: Burin Group (unconformably), Rock Harbour Group

Location
- Region: Newfoundland
- Country: Canada
- Occurrence of Marystown Group in southeastern Newfoundland

The Marystown Group is a Neoproterozoic stratigraphic group of predominantly volcanic sediments – subaerially deposited ash flow tuffs from rhyolites and alkali basalts (with some minor sedimentary strata – red to green siltstones to conglomerates – interleaved), with a central sandstone unit, cropping out in Newfoundland.

It is likely to be temporally equivalent (more or less) to the Love Cove Group, Connaigre Bay Group, Long Harbour Group and Rock Harbour Group.

== Age ==
More accurate/precise dates suggest that the formation is 580-570 Ma (younger than stated in the box above, which uses U-Pb dates).
