= Nevil Maskelyne (disambiguation) =

Nevil Maskelyne (1732–1811) was the fifth English Astronomer Royal.

Nevil Maskelyne may also refer to:

- Nevil Maskelyne (magician) (1863–1924), British magician and inventor
- Nevil Maskelyne (MP) (1611–1679), English MP for Cricklade
- Nevil Story Maskelyne (1823–1911), English geologist and politician

== See also ==
- John Nevil Maskelyne (1839–1917), English stage magician and inventor of the pay toilet
