= R. D. Chater =

British magician and writer

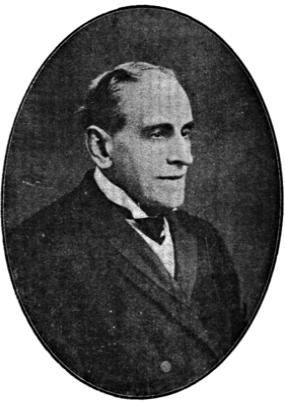
R. D. Chater

R. D. Chater (1836–1913) most well known as Hercat was a British magician and writer. His stage name is an anagram of his surname. Chater worked as journalist and actor as a young man, he later became a professional magician and moved to America. He was famous for performing a cremation illusion.

He was inventor and sole proprietor of the illusion, "The Mystery of She". In 1888 William Morton of the Greenwich Theatre managed the protection of the copyright.

Hercat's British tour in 1889 was organised by Morton. He was described as: HERCAT the American Illusionist, Ventriloquist, and Humorist. His programme was: The Egyptian Hall, Ten Weeks; Olympia, Nine Weeks; Edinburgh, Five Weeks; Belfast, Three Weeks; Birmingham, Four Weeks.

He authored many books on card tricks.

== Publications ==
- Card Tricks and Conjuring Up to Date (1896)
- Latest Sleights, Illusions, Mind Reading and New Card Effects (1903)
- Ventriloquist and Ventriloquial Dialogues (1905)
- Conjuring Up to Date (1906)
- Hercat's Latest Sleights and Illusions (1906)
- Card Tricks With and Without Apparatus Up to Date (1906)
- Chapeaugraphy, Shadowgraphy and Paper-Folding (1909)
- More Conjuring (1912)
