= Sefton Henry Parry =

Sefton Henry Parry (1832 – 18 December 1887) was a versatile Victorian theatre manager. He was a competent actor, comedian and playwright, could paint scenery, cut out dresses, and do stage-carpentering. He was also an innovator, successful theatre manager, speculator and builder of theatres.

In his early days he travelled widely and by the age of 23 had performed in the United Kingdom, the United States of America, various colonies in the continent of Australia and Cape Colony.

In June 1855, he visited Cape Town, ostensibly for a stopover on the way home to England from the Australia. He stayed two months, constructed his first theatre and presented a number of performances. He returned several times to Cape Town and between 1857 and 1863 built two theatres, established the first professional theatre company and introduced the first seasonal pantomime. Parry is recognised as playing an important role in the development of English professional theatre in Cape Colony. Returning to England, he set up his home in Greenwich, built a theatre there in 1864 and, over the next twenty years, built three more in London and two in the provinces.

== Early Days ==
Sefton Parry, born in London in 1832, was the youngest child of John and Martha Parry, a theatrical family. In his earliest travels.he had been described as one of the leading attractions at Barnum's Museum in New York. Parry's wife, Elizabeth, an actress, was born in Philadelphia. In 1854 Parry briefly visited Cape Town on his way to the Colony of Victoria where he performed at Geelong and Melbourne. He was lionised by the Australian theatre-goers and well rewarded. Despite his English birth, he was described by the Australian correspondent of The Era as an American comedian.

== Drawing Room Theatre, Cape Town 1855 ==
In 1855, returning to England from the Colony of Victoria, and accompanied by his wife Elizabeth, Parry arranged to stop over a little while longer in Cape Town. Deciding the local Garrison Theatre was unsuitable for his use, he quickly constructed what he named the Drawing Room Theatre inside a large room in the Commercial Exchange building. It had 350 seats and was fitted up on the same model as the Reuben's Room in Windsor Castle. The first official performance was on Wednesday, 13 June when he put on Dion Boucicault's comedy, Used Up, or The Peer and the Ploughboy and the farce Family Jars by Joseph Lunn. He and his wife played the leads, helped by members of the Garrison Amateur Company. Parry received a rapturous welcome, and this persuaded him to stay longer.

The Garrison Amateur Company, otherwise known as the Gentleman Amateurs, was a military group of long standing formed during the first occupation of the Cape by the British in 1799. The outbreak of the border wars between 1850 and 1853 naturally curtailed the Garrison's theatrical activities. The arrival of Sefton Parry, together with the establishment of a permanent professional theatre, caused them to finally disband.

Parry postponed his return to England a number of times, giving more performances and working with local amateur groups, notably the Cape Town Dramatic Club. J.R. Taylor acted as his impresario and had been promised a benefit, but this was replaced by a benefit for Patriotic Fund. The Music Corps of Mr Holt assisted in some of the performances. Their farewell performance was held on Thursday, 26 July, consisting of A Phenomenon in a Smock Frock (Brough), The Lottery Ticket (Beazley) and Buried Alive, or The Visit to Japan (M'Pherson).

Finally, after two months he left and, returning to London in the winter of 1855, was engaged by the Strand Theatre, where, with another change of persona, he was publicised as an Australian comedian and as making his first appearance in England.

== Further Cape Town visits 1857 - 1863 ==
=== Harrington Street Theatre 1857 - 1859 ===
Parry returned to Cape Town in 1857, this time with a professional British theatre-company, and built a wooden theatre in Harrington Street.

He is said to have introduced the tradition of a seasonal pantomime with his production of Beauty and the Beast in 1857. Despite that, he claimed the record again the following year and billed Babes in the Wood as "The First Christmas Pantomime in South Africa". It was performed on 27 and 28 December in the Cape Town Theatre with an additional performance at the request of the Governor.

Also in 1858 Parry launched the first recorded professional performance of the full play of Hamlet in his season of Shakespeare plays. During the season, James Lycett, a Shakespeare-loving English businessman who had organised amateur dramatics in Cape Town for many years, was accidentally wounded on stage while playing Macduff to Parry's Macbeth.

Competition came early in 1858 from J. E. H. English, self-styled 'celebrated comic vocalist' at the Theatre Royal, Sheffield, who had arrived in Cape Town with other members of the Sefton Parry Company. After just two months English broke away and set up a rival company called "The Gentlemen Amateurs" in The New Music Hall, Buitekant Street which he had fitted for himself. English's success was considerable, leading Parry to quit the Cape. Parry sold his theatre to W Glyn, a Cape Town businessman who built and let theatres to some profit. Glyn then let the Harrington Street Theatre to Mr English. However, by November, English had disappeared from the scene and the following year, 1859, Parry returned and bought back his theatre.

The same year, during his travels, Parry, his wife and fellow professional comedian George Spencer successfully entertained in Gibraltar for several months along with some amateurs from the garrison. The three then sailed on the P&O steamer Ceylon to Malta to entertain there.

=== Theatre Royal 1860 ===
Parry then commissioned Glyn to build a brick theatre at the corner of Caledon and Harrington street. Much of the planning was Parry's and that of his associate William Groom. It was so constructed that it could be turned into cottages in an emergency. Parry named it the Theatre Royal. It opened on 9 August 1860. (The Theatre Royal was also briefly referred to as the Cape Town Theatre.)

Parry broke away from the Cape Town Dramatic Club to form the Alfred Dramatic Club and in so doing effectively established the first regular professional theatre company in South Africa. It had almost 40 members with Parry as manager and G.H. Galt as secretary. After the success of The Irish Tutor on 15 September, Prince Alfred, who was visiting, bestowed his name upon them, and they became known as the Royal Alfred Dramatic Club.

Parry returned to London in November 1860 on the Royal Mail steamer Dane via St Helena and Ascension. He advertised in The Era that he was 'now prepared to negotiate engagements with Dramatic artists for the Theatre Royal, Cape Town'. His London agent was Henry Butler, 21, Bow- street, also associated with Henry Jameson Turner. A brief journalistic battled took place. A Cape Town correspondent of The Era, probably in the minority, was less than complimentary about Mr Parry's performances though he favoured those of Mrs Parry. On the same page Harry Fraser, one of Parry's actors, challenged his plans to recruit professional players from England saying that the heat in summer was oppressive, the money was poor and opportunities were limited. Parry defended his reputation in the following week's edition. He referred to his previous three year commitment to South Africa, to the quality of the theatre he had built and to his investment in the English actors whose fares he paid to come to South Africa.

=== 1861 - 1863 ===
On 19 February 1861, several of Parry's players, Mrs Clara Tellett, Mr & Mrs W. Bland & Louisa Bland, Thomas Brazier, James Leffier and John Howard, set sail from Bristol with Captain Ferguson on the barque "Chevy Chase" bound for Cape Town. After 6,000 tedious miles and nearly three months, they arrived safe and well on 7 May. The following week the theatre opened.

From 1861 until 1863 Parry and his first professional company, the Royal Alfred Dramatic Club, now reunited with the Cape Town Dramatic Club, utilized the Theatre Royal's stage. The Era's correspondent reported that "the success of Mr. Sefton Parry's Company at the Theatre Royal here has been considerable, and we should think, judging from the crowded houses, that Mr. P. must be well satisfied with the financial prospects of his undertaking. Mr. Parry's Low Comedy is exceedingly good and his characters are invariably hits. The Theatre is really a blessing to us, for Cape Town is awfully dull, and we are glad to think that Mr. Parry's enterprise is meeting with the reward he so well deserves. The Drama at the Cape of Good Hope has never before been so well represented in Africa as it has been during the last three or four months". Mrs Clarissa Tellett was a great favourite with the audiences, and even more so with Captain Ferguson whom she married.

Shuter Bland, a well known British stage manager, was part of the Sefton Parry company from 1861 to 1862 and participated in 50 productions between May and November. He accompanied the three-month tour to Port Elizabeth in 1862 where Parry took on the lease of the White's Road Theatre. Parry opened with Planche's Grist to the Mill on 2 June. The rest of the Bland family were still in the company.

The following year, 1863, Parry wound up his Cape Town activities and then went on to Natal to close down the Port Elizabeth theatre. After Parry left Cape Town, Mrs Tellett took over the management of the Theatre Royal, but was not successful. Cape playgoers favoured talent from England and she was hampered by a serious shortage of professional actors. It closed before the end of the year.

The Encyclopaedia of South African Theatre, Film, Media and Performance (ESAT) describes Sefton Parry as the first of several strong personalities from England and Australia who helped establish professional theatre in South Africa.

== Greenwich Theatre 1864 ==
Parry returned to England and in September 1863, as 'an actor from the Cape of Good Hope', appeared at the Princess's Theatre London as Cousin Joe in the farce of The Rough Diamond, and "displayed so much broad comic humour as to gain the hearty applause of his audience and the good will of the press." In November, Parry reopened His Majesty's Theatre in Richmond, Surrey. Both he and his wife performed. Parry's return to England marked the construction of several new theatres.

Parry's first theatre, the Greenwich Theatre, was built on a vacant site on London Street at Greenwich, which he opened in May 1864 with seating for a thousand people. He promised that the style of performance would be similar to that of the old Adelphi, but with improvements that would suit contemporary taste; his enterprise would also draw on the latest skills and theatrical inventions.

As actor- manager he gathered round him a small company, comprised initially of Bessie Foote (from Theatre Royal, Edinburgh), Eliza Hamilton (from Theatre Royal, Sadler's Wells), Sallie Turner (comedian and eldest daughter of Henry Jameson Turner of the Royal Strand), Josephine Ruth (from Theatre Royal, Portsmouth), and Marion Foote; and Messrs. Frank Barsby (from Theatre Royal, Brighton), W. Foote (Theatre Royal, Edinburgh), E. Danvers (Royal Strand Theatre), and Mr Westland.

The theatre was initially known as the New Greenwich Theatre. Although it subsequently acquired several names including Theatre Royal, Morton's Theatre, Prince of Wales Theatre and Carlton Theatre, it was always known as the Greenwich Theatre. It was put up for auction in 1909 and soon after became a cinema.

== Five More Theatres ==
Parry made his home in Greenwich near the theatre with his wife Elizabeth and daughter Emily. His second daughter, Mabel, was born there. He prepared plans and undertook the preliminary management for more theatres in London and the provinces.

=== Theatre Royal, Holborn 1866 ===
Despite the passing of the Theatres Act 1843 over twenty years earlier that broke the monopoly of the patent theatres, no new theatre had been added to the places of entertainment in central London until Parry built, upon the site of an old coach-house and stables, the first of his central London theatres, called, after the thoroughfare in which it was situated, the Holborn Theatre. It opened on 6 October 1866 with Dion Boucicault's drama, specially written for the occasion, The Flying Scud, with a real horse and George Belmore as Nat Gosling the old jockey, was a great success. Parry remained lessee of the house until 1872. It burnt down on 4 July 1880, and the First Avenue Hotel later stood on the site.

=== Globe Theatre 1868 ===
In 1868 he built on a portion of the ground of Old Lyon's Inn in Newcastle Street, Strand, a house which he christened the Globe Theatre with seating for about 1500. It opened on 28 November 1868 with H. J. Byron's comedy, Cyril's Success. No other piece of much mark was produced during Parry's management there, which lasted until 1871.

=== New Theatre Royal, Hull 1871 ===
Parry also built the New Theatre Royal, Hull which he opened on 27 November 1871 with a production by his own company of the Post Boy by H. T. Craven and Tom Taylor, The Ticket of Leave Man. Parry played the lead in both plays.

=== The Royal Avenue Theatre 1882 ===
In early 1880, Parry, recovering from a severe attack of paralysis, started planning his next theatre, to be called The Royal Avenue, at the corner of Craven Street and Northumberland Avenue, facing the Thames. This opened on 11 March 1882, with Jacques Offenbach's opera Madame Favart, in which Florence St. John took the title rôle. The lessee was Mr. Edmund Burke and the manager, M. Marius. The seating capacity was about 1300.

=== Prince of Wales Theatre, Southampton 1883 ===
His final construction was the Prince of Wales Theatre in Southampton which he opened in June 1883. The plan of the building was similar to that of his Globe Theatre in London and the Theatre Royal in Hull. Parry described it as the best and most convenient he had ever erected.

== Final years ==
Parry wrote The Bright Future, a drama produced at the opening of the Grand Theatre, Islington, on 4 August 1883.

Parry died, after much suffering from a paralytic attack, at Cricklewood Lodge, Middlesex, in 1887, aged fifty-five, and was buried in Old Willesden churchyard. After his death his theatres were managed by the Sefton Parry Trust; the Trust continued into the 20th century. William Morton, noted for his management of the illusionists Maskelyne and Cooke, had, at Parry's request, taken on the management of the then ailing Greenwich Theatre in 1885. Morton turned this around and later bought it outright from the Trustees. Morton was also appointed a representative of the Trust, overseeing all their properties. In 1895, the Trust persuaded Morton to take on the management of the Theatre Royal Hull.

Parry's career is well documented in the pages of the weekly theatrical newspaper, The Era, between 1854 and 1888.

== Bibliography ==
- This article incorporates text from a publication now in the public domain: "Parry, Sefton Henry". Dictionary of National Biography. London: Smith, Elder & Co. 1885–1900. (The reference to 'his son' at the end has been deleted; he had two daughters, no sons. The Era, 21 July 1888, Mr Sefton Parry's Will.
- FCL Bosman, Drama and theatre in South Africa. Part 1. 1652-1855 . Dutch-Afrikaansche Uitgevers Maatschappij v / h J. Dusseau & Co., Cape Town / JH de Bussy, Pretoria 1928
- The Encyclopaedia of South African Theatre, Film, Media and Performance (ESAT).
- The Era - a theatrical newspaper accessed through the British National Archives, issues between 1854 and 1888
