= William Morton (theatre manager) =

English theatre and cinema manager

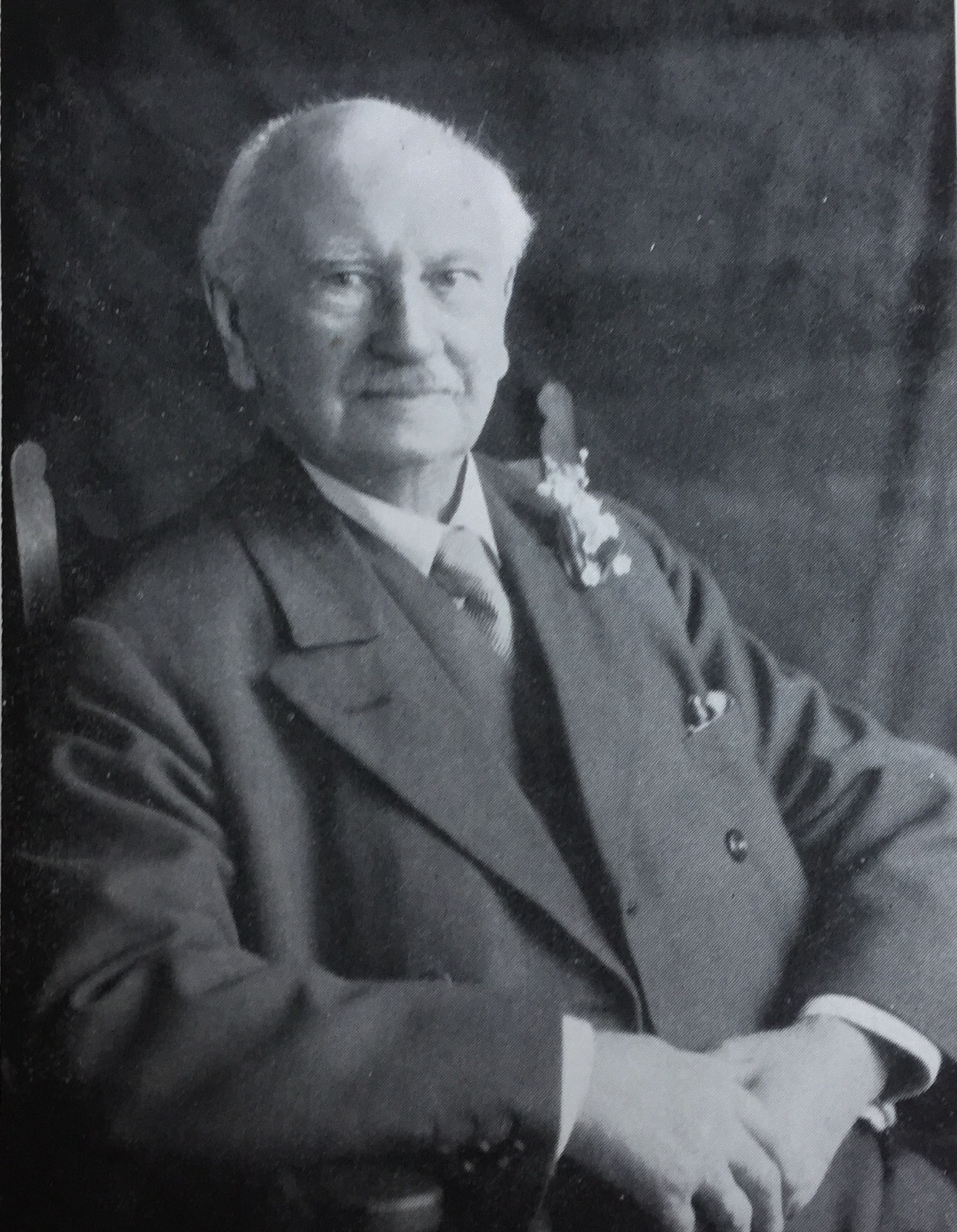
- William Morton, age 96
- Born: 24 January 1838; Royston, Cambridge, UK
- Died: 5 July 1938 (aged 100); Kingston upon Hull
- Resting place: Cottingham cemetery, Kingston upon Hull
- Education: Royston 'British School'
- Occupations: Amusement caterer, theatre & cinema proprietor
- Years active: 1865 - 1935
- Spouse(s): Annie Todd, married 50 years
- Children: Constance, Bertha, George, William F, Tom, Eliza, Eleanor (Nellie)
- Parent(s): George and Maria Morton

William Morton (24 January 1838 – 5 July 1938) was an amusement caterer, a theatre and cinema manager in England for 70 years.

After an erratic start in Southport, Morton's career stabilised when he took on struggling illusionists Maskelyne and Cooke. He developed their careers, managed them for sixteen years, established them in the heart of London and presented them by Royal Command for Prince George's 14th birthday.

For sixteen years he was manager of the Greenwich Theatre where he further speculated, developing theatrical businesses in southeast London and the provinces.

In his sixties, he moved north to Hull where he established new companies, developed and built both theatres and cinemas. From 1920 onwards he was interviewed each birthday at his office by the local press who dubbed him the Grand Old Man of Hull. Morton had become an observer and commentator on a century of English life and entertainments.

Morton contributed to the development of Victorian entertainments and the flourishing of legitimate theatre. He prospered during its heyday and saw theatre's eventual acceptance by the 'respectable classes'. In the twentieth century, he embraced new technology and successful pioneered cinematographic entertainment. Only in the 1930s did the decline of theatre-going, and the boom and bust years of cinema, take its toll.

== Early years ==
William Morton, son of George and Maria Morton, was born in the small village of Royston near Cambridge on 18 January 1838. George, an upholsterer, was a leading light in Royston Tradesmens' Benefit Society which spent its profits in building houses. Morton Street bears the family name. Childhood memories included riding on top of a stage coach to Cambridge, and travelling by train (the third-class carriages were like cattle trucks) to see the 1851 Great Exhibition at Joseph Paxton's Crystal Palace in Hyde Park.

Morton received a limited education at the local British School, He also had a stammer which lasted into his middle years. By the age of 12, Morton's entrepreneurship and fascination for entertainment was already evident. He offered his services free to a promoter to sell programmes, thus gaining admission to concerts. He also found himself a job looking after the Mechanics Institute reading-room for 4 hours each evening where he studied the daily papers and monthly magazines, beginning a lifetime habit of self-education.

At the age of 14, his father secured him an apprenticeship at a local newspaper where he became a printer's devil, laboriously setting up type on a primitive "Caxton" hand press. Once his apprenticeship finished, and unhappy with a wage of 16 shillings a week, he moved on. To increase his prospects while working on the Nottingham Guardian as a compositor and assistant reporter, he taught himself shorthand. Moving on to Wales, he practised his shorthand in the local church, writing down the sermons and causing the vicar considerable distress. Early on a prominent local councillor complimented Morton on the report of his speech adding, 'It was a damned sight better than what I said.' In shaking hands Morton found himself left holding a sovereign. Morton went on to join the reporting staff of various regional papers gradually working up his salary and after twelve months in Congleton he settled in Southport where he attained four pounds a week.

== Southport ==
In 1862, after two years on the recently launched Southport Independent and Ormskirk Chronicle, Morton now aged 24, married local girl Annie Todd. Southport had no theatre so, as a hobby, he organised concerts and entertainments including a series of literary lectures. After 8 years in journalism he took on more profitable work (it included first class rail travel) in nearby Liverpool using his shorthand as a solicitor's clerk, first at the County Court, and later with a firm of shipping solicitors. Later still, he opened a shop to sell books and music as well as providing entertainments. This pattern of speculative ventures he later described as "drifting into theatrical work". "I left the profession for which I was educated at the age of 28 and took that of an amusement caterer."

=== Lectures, entertainments and tours ===
Morton's first lecture series was held in the Southport Town Hall early in 1865. He brought in speakers from around the country, arranging for local dignitaries to act as chairmen. Another sideline was teaching shorthand. By 1867 he had become manager of Southport Town Hall Entertainments. By 1870 he advertised as 'Morton’s Concert And Entertainment Institution, established 1865'.

Amongst the talent he engaged were George Grossmith pére, the lecturer, George Dawson the preacher, Clara Balfour the temperance campaigner who also lectured on influential women, and John Bellew, celebrated father of Kyrle Bellew. Bellew doubted Morton's ability to pay his fee of sixty guineas for six nights and insisted on being paid each night in gold. However, Morton objected on principle to paying nightly for Bellew's brandy-and-soda and cigars. Alfred Vance was another popular client, as were Mr and Mrs Howard Paul, Henry Russell and Sir Ben Greet.

His final entertainment series was in 1870 and included a six-year-old child prodigy, Lydia Howard, who was later taken on for a three-month tour. After six weeks, she and her family vanished. He had to cancel Southport and two other venues and was left with numerous expenses to cover. Although he later successfully sued the Howard family, they had no resources to meet their debt.

His business and shop "came to grief" and he was left virtually penniless. Arthur Lloyd, the music hall singer, heard of his troubles and offered him £5 a week plus travelling expenses as 'agent in advance' for a provincial tour. Morton began again as a speculator and took various touring companies on the road, including Sims Reeves. Morton maintained his contacts and would later bring the best to his Greenwich and Hull Theatres. He and Arthur Lloyd's family became firm friends.

=== Maskelyne and Cooke ===
Morton's breakthrough came about through a chance encounter with two struggling illusionists. After seeing their show debunking fake spiritualists in Liverpool at Easter 1869, he negotiated a partnership and after the first month broke even. He then ran them round the country for two years.

Unlike actor-managers, Morton was happiest behind the scenes. On one occasion Maskelyne persuaded him to introduce the act, suggesting he take a glass of whisky to steady his nerves. On stage, Morton found himself unable to speak. That was the only drink he ever took and it forever influenced his temperance theatre policy. His only appearance as a stage star occurred when Mrs Maskelyne was unexpectedly taken ill. Morton recalled being dressed up in her skirts; to this was added her feathered hat and veil, the latter principally to hide his moustache. Minutes later, one of the company whispered, "Don't turn round. Something's bust." The scene was cut to the limit, but finished with applause.

Sometimes things went badly. In Darlington, with small attendances and unable to pay the hall rent, he offered to leave behind his piano as security. The manager, an old Quaker, declined saying that although on principle he never attended entertainments, he had heard good reports of Morton's work and of his exposure of the 'false spiritualists'. Thereafter, Morton always raised his hat to Quakers, and almost, he said with characteristic boyish humour, to his regular breakfast cereal, Quaker Oats. Their tour ended in March 1873 with several weeks at the Crystal Palace, Sydenham. Morton had now achieved a regular and satisfactory income. That autumn, he took on the lease of the Egyptian Hall in Piccadilly, renovated it and established his duo firmly in the national consciousness. Morton managed the front of house until 1886, the act continuing until 1905, and then at other major London venues for the next two generations.

The highlight of the partnership was a Royal Command to bring the then twenty-strong company to Sandringham on 3 June 1879 to entertain the young Prince George (the future George V) on his fourteenth birthday.

== Greenwich ==
Around 1874 Morton, his wife and six children moved south to gain easy access to the metropolis, setting up their home and his office at 'Royston Villa', 276 New Cross Road in Deptford. Early on Morton had developed a love of horses, learning to ride at an uncle's farm; each morning he drove his carriage and pair to his Egyptian Hall. He maintained a carriage, his favoured choice of transport, until the beginning of the First World War when the government commandeered his horses and he reluctantly purchased a motor car.

=== New Cross Public Hall ===
In 1880, Morton took over the lease and management of nearby New Cross Public Hall. The Hall was used on weekdays for local activities and amateur groups, including ghost shows and dioramas. He developed a local dramatic company with Henry Bedford which performed on Saturdays. On 20 August 1883, after renovations, he re-opened the Hall as a thousand-seater regular theatre with a relatively new play by Arthur C Jones entitled Elmine, or Mother & Son. Future Saturday bookings included Richard D'Oyly Carte's opera company with HMS Pinafore and The Pirates of Penzance, and Wood and Pleon's Ethiopian minstrels. Morton continued as manager of the Hall until 1897 when competition from the nearby newly opened 3000-seat Broadway Theatre, together with ever demanding London County Council requirements (challenged by Morton) made the Hall unprofitable. Morton advertised it for sale in The Era and to his surprise got the asking price.

=== Greenwich Theatre ===
In May 1884 Morton was offered the stagnating Greenwich Theatre by its builder and owner, Sefton Parry. A once prosperous theatre "had been reduced to utter ruin by the incompetence and mismanagement of the speculators", said The Era. Morton eventually accepted the lease with an option to buy at a future date. Once reconstructed and redecorated, he proposed to distance himself from the recent past and rename it as the New Prince of Wales's Theatre. On opening day, 21 August 1884, Morton introduced himself to the audience and explained his policies, namely to meet the growing demand for quality drama in south-east London. In the first week he presented Lord Lytton's Money, Sheridan's The School for Scandal and Boucicault's The Streets of London. On Boxing Day, his first pantomime was Lloyd Clarance's Aladdin.

He devoted sixteen years to running the Greenwich Theatre, investing his own money, and rightly claimed that by good maintenance, and by engaging some of the best touring companies such as D'Oyly Carte, Ellen Terry and Dan Leno, he turned a derelict property into something that mattered. Press reports on Morton's management were consistently positive. He was often called 'Greenwich Morton', to distinguish him from other namesakes in the business.

Of Morton's sons, 'W.F.' (William Frederick) came into the business aged twelve and was a theatre manager by sixteen. George and 'W.F.' were both managers at Greenwich; Tom acted there. Of Morton's four daughters, three eventually married theatre men. Constance, married his Scottish scenic designer, Tom Bogue, who in 1889 left the Gaiety Theatre, Glasgow to produce Morton's Christmas pantomime. The youngest, Eleanor, would marry Gibb McLaughlin, an amateur character actor from Hull who later became a successful film star.

The theatre changed names several times. In 1896 he purchased the theatre outright from the Sefton Parry Trust (Parry died in 1887) and settled for Morton's Theatre. Even so, it never lost its popular names of Greenwich Theatre and Theatre Royal.

In 1897 he purchased a nearby site and engaged the noted architect, W. G. R. Sprague, (who had designed the Broadway Theatre) to produce plans for a new theatre seating 3,000, but this was never followed through. In 1900, he sold the theatre to Arthur Carlton and, now in his mid sixties, turned his full attention to Hull and a new phase of his career.

=== London and Provincial Businesses ===
Morton had developed his theatrical business by drawing on skills developed in previous careers. As a newspaper compositor he had learned attention to detail; as a reporter he knew the value of publicity and the best and most economic way to get it. The self-taught skill of shorthand he valued highly and advocated as a skill for all. His experience as a solicitor's clerk gave him a basis for navigating the increasing frustrating legal demands on managers.

He now expanded. In July 1886 he briefly took over the management of a theatre in East Greenwich. By 1889 he was Technical Director for the Victoria Theatre, Newport, Monmouth. He managed a tour by illusionist 'Hercat', also publicly protecting Hercat's copyright.

In March 1892, he listed his south-east London projects as follows: proprietor of Morton's Theatres Greenwich, lessee and manager of New Cross Public Halls, New Cross Skating Rink and the Grand Theatre Hall, Bromley. The latter he had built and opened on 3 February 1890 with seating for 800. In all these projects he was assisted by George and 'W.F.'.

He was London agent for the 'American Enterprises of James M. Hardie and Miss Von Leer'. He offered his services as 'Arbitrator to the Profession', In particular: advertising skills, financial management, purchasing opportunities, and expertise in dealing with County Councils. He was also advertising as William Morton's Property Agency, with two West End Theatres to let, one suburban theatre to be let or sold, and declared an interest in any pleasantly situated theatre for either purchase or lease.

He was also the Sefton Parry Trust's representative for the Avenue Theatre in London, their Prince of Wales's Theatre in Southampton and, in 1895, for their Theatre Royal in Hull (see below).

He became a member of the council of the Theatrical Managers' Association during the time Sir Henry Irving was chairman.

== 'Church and Stage' ==
=== Conflict ===
Morton had already found himself in conflict with the church while a journalist in Southport. His wife-to-be found a note inserted in her hymn book which read "Be not unequally yoked together." Morton confronted his critic, won him round and received a generous wedding present. At that time, Morton commented in his memoirs, there was more bigotry. "The religious community looked upon actors and press men as less godly than other people." The prejudiced 'respectable classes' were catered for by non-theatrical shows. The Hull Daily Mail, echoed, "To many of extreme religious views, his profession was anathema".

In a 1910 lecture, which included a couple of Maskelyne's illusions, Morton said that the Protestant Church still took too prejudiced a view against the stage. Considering the greater temptations he did not consider actors any worse than others. Both Church and Stage were moving to the same goal. No drama was successful that made vice triumphant. Many of the poor did not go to church or chapel, and but for the theatre they might fail to see the advantage in being moral. Many considered Morton's profession "a wasteful extravagance which lured young people from the narrow path," reported his local paper. Morton's advice to the young was to secure and retain a good character, to persevere and to cultivate their strongest talent. Believe in God and in yourself. Do not recognise the word 'cannot'. Be enterprising and ambitious. Sacrifice home comforts. Show punctuality and truthfulness. "If truth will not help you, falsehood never will. Alcoholic drinking is the greatest curse in the world."

Morton lived to see greater tolerance. On his hundredth birthday, in 1938, the Hull Daily Mail said Morton was held in great respect, "even by those who would not dream of entering any theatre. Whatever he brought for his patrons, grand opera, musical comedy, drama, or pantomime, came as a clean, wholesome entertainment."

Criticism was a two-way process. In 1886 Morton complained publicly about the Church flouting regulations by putting on plays for financial gain without a license. The Era, which normally treated Morton with respect, responded with a robust satirical editorial which incorporated a history of church/stage relationships. Morton, undeterred, explained that current church practice was in direct and unfair competition with his New Cross business. Furthermore, he had just received an unapologetic letter from a local clergyman who thanked him for the free publicity!

=== Positive interaction ===
Following the Evangelical Revival of 1859, it was not uncommon for flourishing churches to hire theatres for their expanding Sunday congregations. C H Spurgeon, Baptist preacher of the Metropolitan Tabernacle (and highly respected by Morton) variously used the Surrey Music Hall, the Exeter Hall and the Crystal Palace. Morton seems unsure of the practice but he did advertise one of his halls as available for church activities. He was positive about sacred drama. On Good Friday,1889, he organised a grand sacred concert at the Greenwich Theatre which included Sims Reeves. In 1899, and on many subsequent occasions, he booked his friend William Greet's company with The Sign of the Cross, a popular drama by Wilson Barrett written explicitly to bring Church and Stage closer together. In Hull Morton rented out a hall to social activist 'Woodbine Willie', the controversial wartime chaplain, in 1926.

=== Religion, sabbath and temperance ===
Morton's father had been a Churchman and his mother a Congregationalist. During the years in New Cross, Morton's daughters devoted their spare time to work at St. James's Church, Hatcham. Morton, had been a sidesman there, but following a notorious and violent controversy between High and Low Church he left and became a member of Dr Joseph Parker's congregation at the nonconformist City Temple in London. Parker spoke positively of the theatrical profession.

Morton was no party man in politics and hardly less so in religion. He summed up his own faith in one sentence: "I believe in the truth of the old-fashioned doctrine, that is, in God, the Creator and King and Ruler of the Universe, and of Jesus Christ the Saviour of Sinners." He was always grateful for the blessing of God that sustained him.

His family motto was 'Sunday home'. "I was always a strict Sabbatarian and looked on Sunday as a day of rest, both for man and beast." In 1931, he said of the Sunday Opening Bill, "My personal views are opposed to Sunday labour."

Morton insisted on temperance in all his theatres. He publicly informed a disgruntled protester at Greenwich that six public houses were accessible during the three intervals. Morton's policy built up positive relations with local publicans. Furthermore, explained his son 'W.F.', in other theatres, audiences quite often attended the theatre for the drink rather than the show. But in a temperance theatre, a visiting touring manager knew that his and Mr Morton's interests were identical; the audience was more attentive, having paid their money solely to see the performance.

== Hull theatres and cinemas 1895 - 1919 ==
=== Theatre Royal ===
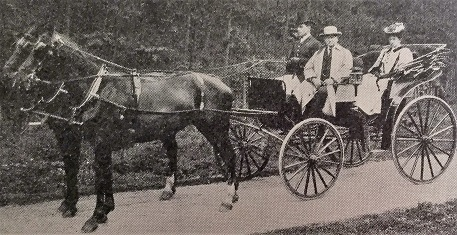
William Morton and his daughter arriving in Hull with his own carriage and pair, 1895

In 1895 the Sefton Parry Trust persuaded Morton to take over management of the now loss-making Theatre Royal in Hull. The rent would be £20 per week, the total weekly costs, including rates taxes and salaries, £120. He was warned that Yorkshiremen liked their beer and whisky so his plan to do away with the bars caused quite a sensation. On 22 July, he told the Hull Daily Mail, "I hope to spend one week in each month at Hull. My second son, W. F. Morton, arrives here today to assume the duties of Managing Director." 'W. F.' had been touring for two years with Morton's own version of the comedy-drama, The Ups and Downs of Life, in which youngest son Tom had also appeared. Morton's son-in-law Tom Bogue was to be resident artist. From this point on it was clearly a family business, and it prospered.

In 1898 the Theatre Royal showed a 'Veriscope' film, probably the first time any film was shown in a Hull theatre.

=== Alexandra Theatre ===
In 1900 'W.F' (aged 30) was featured in The Era as a manager of considerable talent and theatrical reputation in his own right. In 1902, Morton ('there is no more highly respected man in theatredom', enthused the Hull Daily Mail) embarked on a new style of management. Together with sons, George and 'W.F.', he formed Morton's Ltd with himself as Managing Director. Another of the five directors was John Martin-Harvey, a long-standing friend whose company paid annual visits. Each director contributed £1,000.

Morton's Ltd erected the Alexandra Theatre in Charlotte Street, adjoining both George street and Bourne street. Designed by Tom Guest, a special feature was a sliding roof for ventilation, a real benefit in a smoking environment. The theatre's distinctive tower, taller than Hull's Wilberforce Monument, was topped by an electric revolving searchlight visible for miles around. The Alexandra maintained the Morton temperance tradition. It accommodated 3,000 people including 800 standing and had four refreshment departments. George Morton, more recently manager of Morton's one-time rival, the Broadway Theatre in New Cross, was appointed manager. Initially the Hull theatres would be co-ordinated. The Royal, already dubbed, 'The Home of Grand Opera and Latest Musical Productions', would have the higher class of programme while the Alexandra would be devoted almost exclusively to drama.

The Alexandra opened on Boxing Day, December 1902, with two performances of the W. G. Wills' Napoleonic romance, "A Royal Divorce" starring Frederick Moyes and Edith Cole and produced by American entrepreneur W. W. Kelly. (This had also been Morton's final production in Greenwich.) "After that", reminisced George Morton in 1934, "came other touring companies, and grand opera for seasons of four and five weeks". He recalled the 80-strong Moody-Manners Opera Company. "Every grand opera star of those days appeared with it, including the famous Blanche Marchesi and Zela de Tessa." Another Kelley production was Theodora with a jungle scene and real lions roaming about the stage.

=== The Grand Theatre and Opera House ===
In 1904, Morton transferred the lease of his Bromley Theatre to Arthur Carlton and finally moved his home to Hull. In 1907, he bought out his neighbouring rival in George Street, the Grand Theatre and Opera House, for £26,000 and moved 'W. F.' across to be manager. Despite its name, the theatre, designed by renowned Frank Matcham and first opened in 1893, had been used mainly for drama. The Mortons continued their practice of bringing opera to Hull, including Thomas Beecham's Opera Comique in 1911 with The Tales of Hoffmann, and the Quinlan Opera Company in 1912 with singers from the 'Principal Opera Houses in the World'. In 1912 another highlight was 'Pavlova Week'. The Carl Rosa Opera Company were regular visitors.

Theatre Royal attendance suffered from the successes of the Alexandra and the Grand so, in 1909, Morton allowed the lease to expire and it closed. For only the second time in 14 years, Morton spoke from the Royal's stage saying he believed Hull could now sustain only two theatres, but that the Royal had served its day and generation. (It reopened under new management in 1912 as the Tivoli Music Hall.)

=== Prince's Picture Hall ===
Cinematograph was a regular part of the programme at the Alexandra. It had been licensed under the 1909 Cinematograph Act, as had the Palace and Empire theatres. The Act was essentially a health and safety measure though its implementation soon included censorship. George Morton brought in back-screen projection, further improving quality.^{[3]} Morton, convinced that moving pictures were the way forward, entered into partnership with the New Century (Leeds) Circuit and registered a private company, three directors from Morton's and two from New Century, called Prince's Hall (Hull) Ltd. With a capital of £10,000 in £1 shares, they took over the Victoria Hall (previously the George-street Baptist Chapel) demolished it and built the Prince's Picture Hall, opening in July 1910. The work was designed and carried out by local architects, Freeman, Sons, and Gaskell and had 1500 seats. The Prince's was the first purpose-built cinema in Hull. As the number of cinemas increased, so did competition. Managers sought to acquire exclusive features and to exhibit major films as soon as possible after their release. Technical improvements were eagerly pioneered.

=== Holderness Hall ===
Morton next focussed on East Hull and, as Holderness Hall Ltd built a theatre for cinematograph entertainment, opening 16 November 1912. This work was also designed and carried out by Freeman, Sons, and Gaskell. It cost £12,000, seated 2,000 people and had three cafes. The two large entrance halls on Holderness Road and New Clarence Street meant no more queuing in the cold and rain. A projecting balcony had been built to support a grand piano (costing 175 guineas) that enabled the player to observe the film. Morton promised pictures of the highest standard, depicting 'Scenes of Travel, Adventure, Comedy, Drama, Education and Current Events', and that 'the working classes' would hear quality music they had never heard before. In 1913 the Holderness Hall introduced Kinetophone Talking Pictures. The following year the Prince's Hall also experimented with sound though 'talkies' would not be significant for another 15 years.

=== Majestic Picture House ===
In the darkening days of 1914, Morton and his sons established another company, Morton's Pictures, Ltd, to build the Majestic Picture House on the site of the old Empire Variety Hall in George Street. Again, Freeman, Sons, and Gaskell, designed and carried out the work. Two stone lions (now in Hornsea Memorial Gardens.) guarded its entrance. The Majestic, completed six months after the outbreak of war, opened on 1 February 1915 and had a built-in wide screen and three projectors. Challenging their nearby rivals, the Kinemacolor Palace (which had displayed colour films since 1910), it featured 2,000 feet of exclusive Kinemacolor film (as shown at London's Scala Theatre) including "Grape vineyards in Piedmont, Italy." The programme was completed with 'the highest class of films'. Morton explained to the audience that the magnificent building was not just for the current days of darkened streets, but for future brighter days. A string orchestra played throughout the programme. Son-in-law, Tom Bogue became manager.

Although 29 venues were now giving regular film shows in Hull, Morton's was the largest and most influential cinema chain. Morton also put together a concert party of professionals and amateurs to entertain troops while waiting for embarkation to engage in World War I.

=== Assembly Rooms ===
The Assembly Rooms on Kingston Square had had a long and varied history. On 30 September 1919, Morton realised his final venture, purchasing the Rooms and converting the larger hall into a picture house. As with all his projects, Morton supervised the building on a daily basis. Improvements included music provided by an eight-piece orchestra, special performances on the updated organ and a new booking system that would abolish queues. The main film for opening week was Quinneys, the popular English romantic play by Horace Vachell, adapted for cinema with Henry Ainley and Isobel Elsom in the leading parts.

== Lecturer and raconteur ==
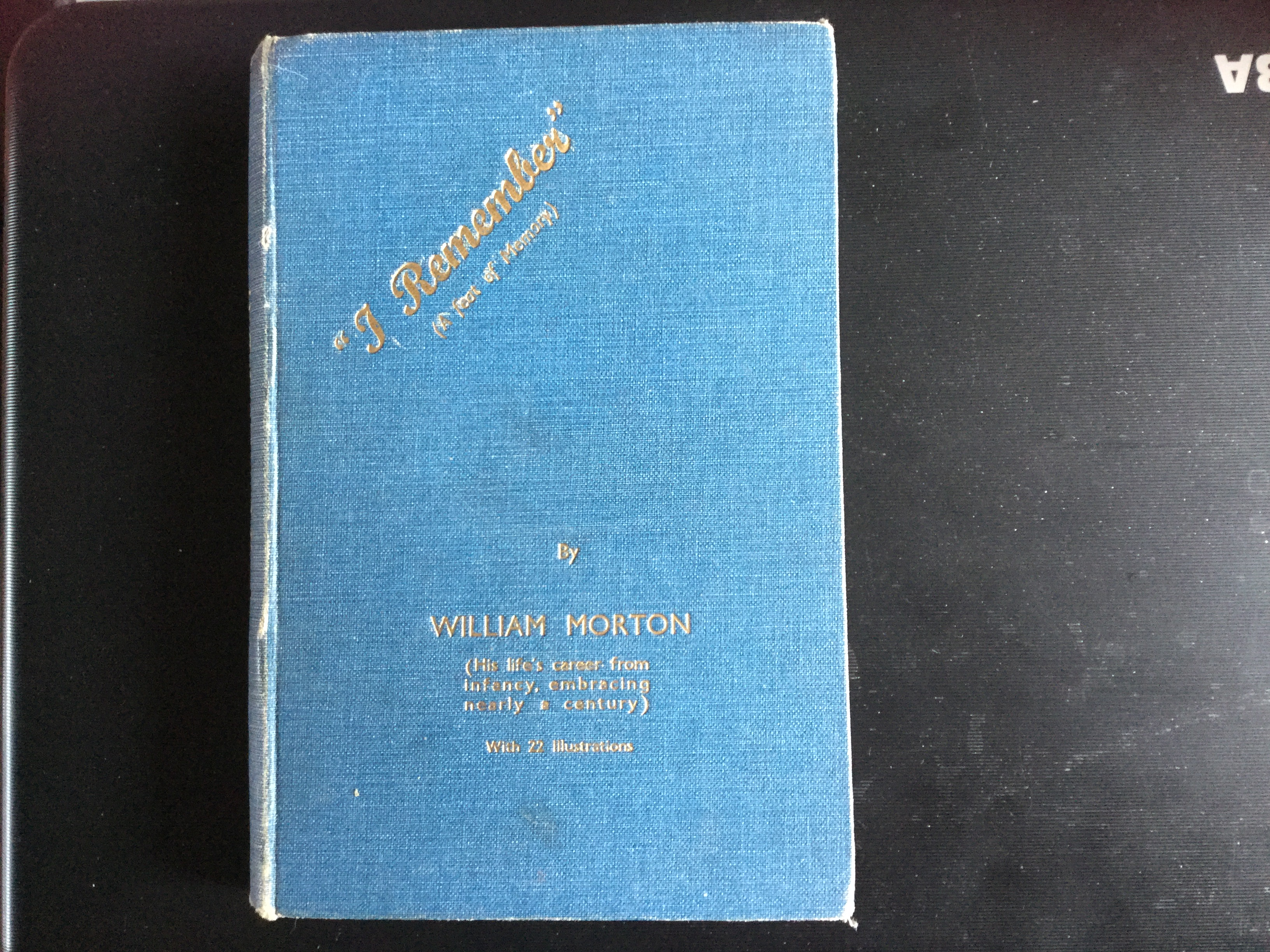
"I Believe", William Morton's memoirs, published in 1934

From his earliest days at Greenwich, Morton made a report to his audience at each annual benefit. To a crowded house in 1898, he reminded them, "Ladies and Gentlemen, you know what difficulty I have had on similar occasions to find sufficient courage and suitable language to express my gratitude.". By perseverance he had overcome his stammer and shyness and developed a new skill. Later, in Hull he himself became a raconteur. At Cottingham in 1909, he gave his "Reminiscences of a long business career"; ironically 26 years of business still lay ahead. On another occasion, he spoke of "Shows and Showpeople", in 1910 at Salem Chapel Bazaar of "Church and Stage" and at Fish Street Memorial of "Secrets of Success", and in 1913 at Pocklington of "Man, Woman and the Devil". He repeated his lectures around the county.

By 1920 the Hull Daily Mail was interviewing Morton on his birthday, a practice which continued every January until his hundredth. They dubbed him the Grand Old Man of Hull and invariably asked for words of wisdom about life and the theatrical business. Before writing his own account at the age of 96, Morton took a medical. The doctor said he had 'the complexion of a girl and the heart of a boy' to which a Mail journalist added "and the mind of a businessman in his prime." So, Morton published "I Remember", a series of personal anecdotes, well reviewed by The Era, Hull Daily Mail and Yorkshire Evening Post.

== Hull theatres and cinemas 1920 - 1935 ==
Morton, now 82, focussed his energies on overseeing his empire. It comprised two theatres: the Alexandra and the Grand, and four cinemas: the Prince's, Holderness Hall, the Majestic and the Assembly Rooms. His sons and son-in-law each had major roles, but Morton still headed up the businesses, chairing company meetings into his nineties.

=== Heyday ===
While the theatre was still in its heyday, 'W. F.' travelled thousands of miles each year to see new plays and shows which he then brought to Hull. Amongst those who entertained at the Alexandra were Sir John Martin-Harvey, Fred Terry, Julia Neilson, Phyllis Neilson-Terry, Denis Neilson-Terry, Matheson Lang, F. R. Benson, Oscar Asche, Sir Henry Lytton, H. B. Irving, and Jean Forbes-Robertson.

Despite the erosion of the theatre brought about by cinema over two decades, Morton's opinion in 1920 was that " theatrical matters were never more promising than at the present moment". He believed public taste had improved, that revues were on the wane and that people wanted more substantial entertainment. Regarding companies currently buying up picture palaces in Hull, Morton thought that smaller halls would have difficulty; wages were now high, and current expenses were three times higher than before the war. The Era ran a special feature, to which Morton contributed, describing the ongoing financial burden of Entertainment Tax, a 'temporary' wartime measure.

The Assembly Rooms did not prosper as a cinema but financial success was achieved in 1923 by converting the main building into a popular dance hall. The adjacent Lecture Hall was converted into a 700-seat theatre and soon renamed the Little Theatre. In September 1924 the Hull Repertory Theatre Company founded by Arthur Whatmore booked a four-week season, followed by 81 plays over the next 6 years. The aim, part of the new 'Little Theatre' movement, was to bring quality contemporary plays to the city. Early in 1925, Morton brought in friend, Ben Greet, and his famous Shakespearean group to perform The Tempest and The Merchant of Venice. They also played for local schools and colleges.

In 1925, asked if the broadcasting of wireless concerts was yet more competition for the theatre, Morton said it actually benefited managers and would not significantly affect attendances. It would be foolish to oppose it, "because the wireless has come stay." As regards cinemas, Morton said that although pictures were getting better and cheaper, managers were handicapped by the distributor's excessive charges and the difficult conditions they included in the contracts.

In 1928 the Cinematograph Films Act came into force. Its aim was to protect the industry from the dominance of poor quality Hollywood films, to improve the quantity and quality of British films, and to encourage vertical integration between producers, distributors and exhibitors. The effect was mixed and not generally appreciated by independent managers marginalised by this decision. Despite this, Morton declared, "The picture business continues to attract ... the prices of admission are within the reach of everybody. But you must have a good picture backed up by good music and judicious advertising." 1928 was also the year of the 'talkies'. The Majestic was upgraded with a British Talking Pictures sound system. Of the theatre business, Morton said he still found musical shows to be the most profitable. Pantomime, which everyone thought was dying, was undergoing a healthy revival.

The Hull Daily Mail recalled later that 'W.F.' was highly regarded by theatre managers "for his business acumen, unquestioned probity, and his strict regard for the letter of his bond. His judgment of the public taste in theatrical entertainment was unerring. His co-directors regarded him as a very able man of proved capacity in theatre management and a very sound henchman in the troubled waters of cinema competition."

=== Troubled waters ===
By 1930 the impact of those troubled waters was intensified by the Great Depression. Morton said that the talkies had shut down the theatres and music-halls, and that the building scramble for talkies was stopping. And so the Grand was remodelled as a cinema, leaving the Alexandra as Hull's one remaining significant theatre.

==== Cinema difficulties ====
Vertical integration was biting. Gaumont, initially film-makers, were expanding across the country and finally acquired 343 properties. Their cinemas had exclusive access to all Gaumont films and considerable bargaining power elsewhere. Later in 1930 Morton sold the Holderness Hall to Gaumont. The following year he declared optimistically, "The installation of talkies at the Grand Theatre has been a triumphant success." He thought greater success awaited the talkies once quality and musical accompaniment improved. Although the economic situation could not be worse, it was not necessarily bad for business. Surprisingly, during the Lancashire cotton famine (1860-1865), when the mill owners could not get the raw material, business had been better than usual. Men went to the public-houses and places of amusement while their wives and children were crying for bread. The same thing had happened in Hull during the general strike of 1926.

The lead on the front page of the Mail on 21 January 1932 featured five photographs of Morton's daily activities together with his 94th birthday reflections. The world is "in a fog," he said, "but I am optimistic, despite the economic crisis." Old-fashioned practices would die out; the public would educate itself to new methods. Somewhat prematurely he thought the craze for putting up new picture houses had faded out. His concerns were: that cinemas were totally dependent on foreign resources; that distributors made demanding contracts; that although British pictures were coming to the front, they lacked the speculative investment of their Hollywood rivals; that most American pictures were not suited to British tastes and lacked literary value.

==== Theatre decline ====
During the 1920s, the Hull Repertory Company had talks with Mortons' about buying the Little Theatre. They finally did so in 1929, re-opening in September. The following January there was a major fire. Morton's made the Alexandra available free of charge for the now unemployed actors to hold a Saturday matinee benefit.

In July 1932, the Mail lamented that since the Grand became a cinema, Hull theatregoers could no longer see full length musicals or straight plays. Only at the Little Theatre was a whole night's entertainment possible. However, George Morton now planned an ambitious winter season at the Alexandra with first class touring companies. He warned that if attendances did not improve, Hull would lose its last theatre. Despite poor results George tried again the following year, entering into an agreement with Moss Empires and Howard & Wyndham Tours to bring quality companies to the city as part of a network involving 20 provincial towns. Attendances were good for musicals but sparse for drama. Debates in the local press showed no consensus. Was it ticket prices, the wrong productions, theatre ambience or audience apathy? The city's sheriff said, "Surely a city of 330,000 people had ample scope for two legitimate theatres". By January 1934, William Morton was persuaded that provincial theatre was nearly dead. Entertainment Tax was partly to blame. And now there were not enough good theatres to provide a London company with a realistic tour. Said the Hull Daily Mail, "Mortons have for two seasons tried to give Hull a place in the touring lists of first-class companies, and their efforts have been but miserably supported".

In February, at three weeks notice, the popular Denville Repertory Company were called in. "It seems to be our fate to come back and save the Alexandra Theatre," said Len Laurie. This time, they took it over for ten months and performed twice-nightly drama and comedy. In December, a local producer, Anne Croft, presented her final Christmas show, "Tulip Time". Morton having advertising widely but unable to sell, closed down Hull's last professional theatre. Six months later, he let it to Terence Byron Ltd who re-opened in December 1935 as the New Alexandra. It prospered as a variety theatre and Byron's bought it the following year. It was destroyed during the Hull Blitz in 1941.

By contrast, after 1934, the Little Theatre, now managed by Peppino Santangelo, survived and sometimes prospered. To survive, insisted Santangelo, it was necessary to balance artistic principles with commercial viability. In 1939, despite difficult times, the company raised finance to purchase the neighbouring Assembly Rooms and created in its place the New Theatre. It survived various crises and today is Hull's largest theatre, most recently renovated in 2017 during Hull's year as UK City of Culture.

=== Exit ===
By 1935 Morton's businesses ceased to be viable, a financial examination revealing a deficiency of nearly £50,000. The Grand's last film was the American documentary "Africa Speaks". The Grand and the Majestic were sold to Associated Hull Cinemas Ltd, a consortium managed by Brinley Evans. Renamed the Dorchester and the Criterion respectively, both were remodelled.

'W. F.' Morton, aged 65, died that June. Tom Morton continued as licensee of the still successful Prince's Hall Cinema. (It became the Curzon about 1950). Tom Bogue, son-in-law and manager of the Majestic, became licensee of the West Park Cinema, Anlaby Road. (He retired in 1943, aged 83, after losing his wife and his home in an air-raid.) William Morton, now aged 97, severed his connections with cinema and theatre and finally retired to lead a quiet life of hobbies, cared for by an unmarried daughter.

=== Tributes ===
Tributes were paid in a Hull Daily Mail editorial in 1935 to the family's forty-year contribution to quality entertainment in the city. A correspondent to the paper also wrote: "I am old enough to remember, like many others, when Hull was very crudely served in the way of entertainment, and we owe a big debt to the Morton family for all they have done for the way of clean and refined recreation in this city."

== Finale ==
In his nineties Morton still put in a full day's work at his office. Because strangers often expressed incredulity about his age, he kept his birth certificate with him. Asked about the secrets of his longevity, his prescriptions were simple: a healthy lifestyle, regular simple meals, no late night activities, no alcohol. Hobbies and relaxation were important: an evening game of billiards with his daughter; photography in the summer months, colouring his prints with chalks to a professional standard; reading six newspapers every day; listening to the radio; a cigar and 15 cigarettes.

Morton was a man of contrasts. He had deep convictions but always tried to see the other person's point of view. He was a showman but self-effacing; a traditionalist who was forward-looking. He paid attention to detail but had regard for the bigger picture. He gave his sons considerable business responsibilities while they were still children, yet never relinquished his headship.

On his hundredth birthday he received a telegram from King George VI and Queen Elizabeth. There were greetings from the Lord Mayor, and from the directors of Gaumont-British. Another greeting came from illusionist Jasper Maskelyne, grandson of Morton's first protégée. Hull's film star, Gibb Mclaughlin, who was married to his daughter Eleanor, came in person. Morton died six months later on 5 July 1938, at his home at "Royston", 203 Cottingham Road. He had the simplest of funerals with only two mourners, but a glowing obituary on the front page of the local press.

== Bibliography ==
- The Era, The Stage, Hull Daily Mail and other newspapers accessed through British National Archive (subscription)
- Morton, William (1934). I Remember. (A Feat of Memory.). Market-place. Hull: Goddard. Walker and Brown. Ltd.
- Movie Theatres in Hull, England (closed), Cinema Treasures
- "Social institutions," in A History of the County of York East Riding: Volume 1, the City of Kingston Upon Hull, ed. K J Allison (London: Victoria County History, 1969), 418-432. British History Online, accessed 18 May 2016
