= Greenwich Theatre =

Theatre in Greenwich, London, England

- 1855 Rose and Crown Music Hall; 1871 Crowder's Music Hall; 1879 Royal Borough Theatre of Varieties; 1898 Parthenon Theatre of Varieties; 1912 Greenwich Hippodrome
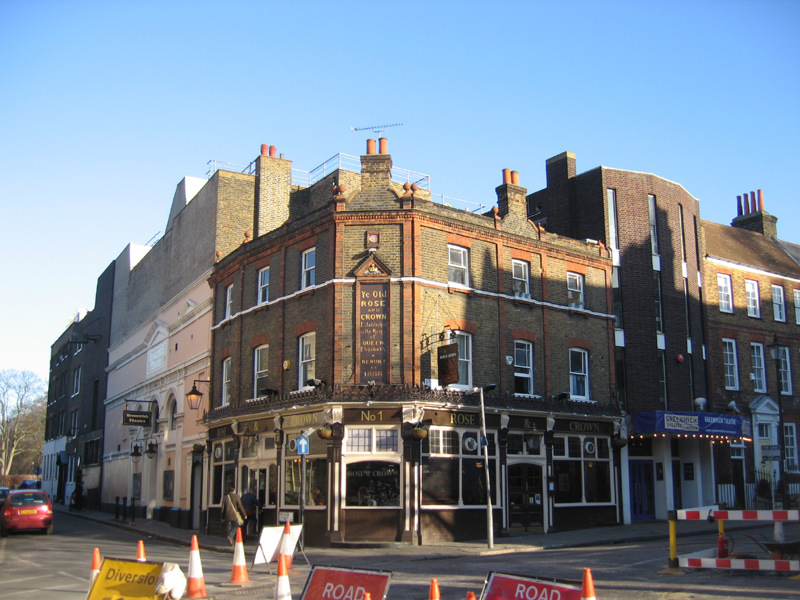
- The two facades of the theatre to either side of the Rose and Crown pub, 2007
- Interactive map of Greenwich Theatre
- Location: Croom's Hill, Greenwich; London, SE10; United Kingdom
- Coordinates: 51.479722°N 0.008333°W
- Capacity: 421
- Production: Visiting productions
- Public transit: Greenwich

Construction
- Opened: 1969; 57 years ago
- Rebuilt: 1871, 1898, 1969

Website
- greenwichtheatre.org.uk

The Greenwich Theatre is an English theatre located in Croom's Hill close to the centre of Greenwich in south-east London.

Theatre first came to Greenwich at the beginning of the 19th century during the famous Eastertide Greenwich Fair at which the Richardson travelling theatre annually performed. The current Greenwich Theatre is the heir to two former traditions. It stands on the site of the Rose and Crown Music Hall built in 1855 on Crooms Hill at the junction with Nevada Street. However, it takes its name from the New Greenwich Theatre built in 1864 by Sefton Parry on London Street, opposite what was then the terminus of the London and Greenwich Railway.

== Richardson's travelling theatre ==
At the beginning of the 19th century, Richardson's travelling theatre made its annual tented appearance during the famous Eastertide Greenwich Fair. In Sketches by Boz, Charles Dickens reminisced enthusiastically, "you have a melodrama (with three murders and a ghost), a pantomime, a comic song, an overture, and some incidental music, all done in five-and-twenty minutes".

In 1842, The Era reported that performances at Richardson's theatre attracted upwards of 15,000 people.

The fair was closed down in 1853 "in consequence of the drunkenness and debauchery (it) occasioned, and the numerous convictions of pickpockets that took place before the police magistrates".

On at least two subsequent occasions, the Greenwich Theatre celebrated its Richardson heritage. In April 1868, at Eleanor Bufton's first night as manager, she recited a poem written for the occasion weaving the Richardson saga around her own. Five years later, at Easter 1873, lessee and manager Mr J. A. Cave reproduced Richardson's performances as closely as possible and even brought back Paul Herring, veteran clown of the 1820s' fair.

There are two later newspaper references to a theatre in Greenwich that was burnt down around 1835, but no other details are given.

== Current theatre: 1864–1911 ==
=== Sefton Parry ===
After extensive experience as actor/comedian travelling the world and manager/theatre builder in South Africa, Sefton Parry built his first English theatre on a vacant site on London Street (now Greenwich High Road) at Greenwich. It opened in May 1864 with seating for 1000 people. He promised that the style of performance would be similar to that of the old Adelphi, but there would be improvements to suit contemporary taste that made the most of the latest skills and recent inventions. His aim was to attract the highest class of residents by superior pieces carefully acted by a thoroughly efficient company. His first recruits were Bessie Foote from the Theatre Royal, Edinburgh, Eliza Hamilton from the Theatre Royal, Sadler's Wells, Sallie Turner, eldest daughter of Henry Jameson Turner of the Royal Strand, Josephine Ruth from the Theatre Royal, Portsmouth, and Marion Foote; also Messrs. Frank Barsby from the Theatre Royal, Brighton, W. Foote from the Theatre Royal, Edinburgh), E. Danvers from the Royal Strand Theatre, and Mr Westland. On opening night The Era described it as "perhaps the most elegant Theatre within twenty miles of London".

Initially christened the New Greenwich Theatre, it subsequently acquired several new names including Theatre Royal, New Prince of Wales's Theatre, Morton's Theatre and Carlton Theatre. Even so, it continued to be known as the Greenwich Theatre and was still recorded as such in 1911 before becoming a cinema. The alternative name, Theatre Royal, Greenwich, emerged as early as 1865 and was used in The Era as late as December 1902. It remained in Parry's ownership until his death in December 1887 when ownership was transferred to the Sefton Parry Trust. It was sold by auction as the "Greenwich Theatre" in 1909.

=== Next managers ===
Parry was soon involved in building further theatres in London. By September 1866, William Sydney (who also managed theatres in Richmond, Norwich & Stockton) had become the lessee and manager, and Herbert Masson his musicaldirector. W. J. Hurlstone, who had been acting manager for Parry, was re-engaged in the same role.

By 1867 the lessee was a Mr Mowbray, and the manager Fanny Hazlewood. Her agent was Henry Jameson Turner whose agency had at one time acted for Parry. At the end of Hazlewood's short tenure before she went to America there were serious issues of non-payment of rent and wages.

=== Swanborough family ===
The Swanborough family, who managed the Royal Strand Theatre from 1858 to 1883, were the next lessees of the Greenwich Theatre. On 11 April 1868, the theatre, popular for its burlesque, opened for the season under the new management of the Welsh actress Eleanor Bufton (wife of Arthur Swanborough). The house had been entirely renovated and redecorated.

Eleanor Bufton recited a poem in typical burlesque style, written for her opening night, that recalled the days of Richardson's travelling theatre at the Greenwich Fair and included the lines:

No matter what the rival shows might be,
Richardson's held, o'er all, supremacy;
Asserting o'er men's minds the Drama's pow'r
With play and pantomime, four times an hour!
The Drama, then, in tent of canvas pent,
Though, in low booth, upheld its high in-tent!
And, 'midst the outside Fair's discordant din,
It cried "Walk up! - just going to begin.

The poem also made topical allusions to John Stuart Mill and the women's suffrage movement.

By February 1871, the management had been taken on by Frederick Belton. In August of that year, Eleanor Bufton was involved in a serious railway accident which affected her memory and interfered with her career.

=== Continuity and decline ===
In 1872, J. A. Cave took out a long lease from Sefton Parry and made considerable alterations and improvements before his opening night. He promised that admission prices would be materially reduced without in any way reducing the quality of the entertainment. He said that twenty years of past successes had proved the value of full houses at moderate prices. Additionally, for those who could afford higher prices, ample accommodation would be provided.

After Cave's time, the theatre gradually sank to a lower and lower level and "a once prosperous place was reduced to utter ruin by the incompetence and mismanagement of the speculators". Those speculating managers included Mr Robertson, Mr H. C. Sidney, Mrs W. Lovegrove & Mr George Villiers, and Mr D. M'Intosh. In late 1879, J Aubrey, then sole lessee and manager, soon after presenting his Christmas pantomime, was made bankrupt.

=== William Morton ===
In 1884, Parry identified William Morton as the man to take over his ruined theatre. Morton's first theatrical success had been to launch and sustain the careers of the renowned magicians Maskelyne and Cooke at the Egyptian Hall and was also currently managing the thousand-seater New Cross Public Hall. In May that year, Morton took on the lease of the Greenwich Theatre with an option to buy at a specified date and price. Once reconstructed and redecorated, Morton proposed to rename it as the New Prince of Wales's Theatre. He intended, if possible, to meet the growing demand for good dramatic performances in south-east London.

Morton devoted sixteen years to running the Greenwich Theatre, investing his own money, and rightly claimed that by engaging some of the best of the touring companies such as [[D' Oyly Carte]], he turned a derelict property into something that mattered. He was often called "the Greenwich Morton" to distinguish him from others of the same name. He boasted that Greenwich was the only temperance theatre in the whole of London. By 1892, he was involved in many other theatres around the country, including acting as the Sefton Parry Trust's representative and personal agent for all their properties. In 1895, he took on the lease of Parry's Theatre Royal in Hull and later purchased it.

Morton engaged Ellen Terry at a guaranteed fee in order to gain prestige for the theatre, knowing that he was bound to make a loss. At "Treasury", Terry asked the manager for a statement of the total receipts, and, realising that Morton would have a serious loss, magnanimously said she would accept only a net share, the only instance, said Morton, of any one who offered to take less than their "pound of flesh".

Dan Leno was involved in a minor drama on the evening of 12 December 1895. Double-booked in Greenwich and Brighton, he was whisked off the Greenwich stage at 10.10 pm, bundled into a cab to New Cross Station, where a specially chartered train took him to Brighton. Within 90 minutes, he was on the stage of the Alhambra.

There were several name changes during Morton's time. New, as is customary, was soon dropped. Later, it became "Morton's Prince of Wales's Theatre" to distinguish it from a new London theatre bearing the same name, but whose letters and telegrams were getting mixed up with theirs. After renovations in 1891, he reopened as Morton's Model Theatre, then called it The Model House and Temperance Theatre, finally around 1898/99 simplifying the name to an earlier usage as Morton's Theatre. By this time, he was the owner. In 1897, he produced plans to build a new theatre seating 3000 on a nearby vacant site but this was never followed through. In 1904, he moved to Hull, where, in 1934, at the age of 96, he published his memoirs. He attributed his health in old age to hard work, regular habits and an abstemious diet.

=== Final years ===
After Sefton Parry's death in 1887, the ownership of his theatres was transferred to the Sefton Parry Trust. William Morton eventually purchased the Greenwich Theatre outright, then, in April 1900, sold it to Arthur Carlton, who named it the Carlton Theatre. It remained so until about 1909. During the final twelve months, the entertainment had become mainly of the music hall type. The building was auctioned in 1909. By now the cinema revolution had taken full hold, and by 1914 it had become the Cinema de Luxe managed by H. Morris of Cinema Palaces Ltd.

The building was demolished in 1937 to make way for a new town hall, now a listed building and under new ownership and renamed Meridian House.

== Crooms Hill site, 1855–present ==
=== Rose and Crown 1855 ===
The site of the current Greenwich Theatre was originally a music hall created in 1855 as modest appendages to, or rooms within, the neighbouring Rose and Crown public house. It was licensed to John Green and known as the Rose and Crown Music Hall.

=== Crowder's Music Hall ===
In 1871 it was reconstructed by Charles Spencer Crowder and renamed Crowder's Music Hall with a separate entrance on Nevada Street. According to reports of the time, it was a splendid building boasting a new stage, ''equal to many of the West End theatres'', and a new lavatory. The architect was W. R. Hough.

It briefly rejoiced in the name "Crowder's Music Hall and Temple of Varieties" but in 1879 was renamed by the new owner, Alfred Ambrose Hurley, as the Royal Borough Theatre of Varieties.

=== Parthenon et al ===
In 1898 it was rebuilt to the designs of John George Buckle, possibly for a Mr Hancock, and became the Parthenon Theatre of Varieties. The plaster façade can still be seen on Nevada Street today. It later became the Greenwich Palace of Varieties,

The theatre's entrance on Crooms Hill dates from about 1902 when Samuel and Daniel Barnard took over and it became Barnard's Palace. It finally became the Greenwich Hippodrome. Playbills of the time mention star names such as Harry Champion and Lily Langtree, with more dramatic performances with spectacular effects projected by the latest attraction – the Edisonograph.

It showed both live performances and films as the Greenwich Hippodrome Picture Palace from 1915 until 1924 when it lost its licence for live entertainment and was converted into a cinema.

During the Second World War, the theatre was re-opened as a repertory theatre with films on Sundays, but when an incendiary bomb crashed through the roof into the auditorium the theatre was closed and remained empty, occasionally being used for storage. In 1949, the building was closed.

=== Greenwich Theatre 1969–present ===
Greenwich Council bought the site for demolition in 1962, but agreed to support the idea of a new theatre if there was enough local enthusiasm to justify it. Ewan Hooper, a local actor and director, accepted the challenge of rallying support. A new building was designed by architect Brian Meeking within the old shell and it eventually reopened as the Greenwich Theatre in 1969.

It had to survive a further crisis in the late 1990s prompted by the 1997 withdrawal of its annual subsidy from the London Arts Board. It eventually reopened in November 1999.

The seating capacity is currently 421, around an open thrust stage.

== Theatrical history 1969–present ==
On 21 October 1969, the theatre re-opened with Martin Luther King, a new piece of musical theatre written by Ewan Hooper, Artistic Director. Alan Vaughan Williams directed.

From 1969, the theatre became a showcase for many new dramatic works. Early plays included Chekhov's Three Sisters and Jean Genet's The Maids, featuring Glenda Jackson, Susannah York and Vivien Merchant - many of the Greenwich cast featured in the subsequent film version. In 1975, Vivien Merchant and Timothy Dalton headed the cast of a revival of Noël Coward's The Vortex. Greenwich Theatre also saw the première of John Mortimer's A Voyage Round My Father and, on 5 November 1981, Rupert Everett appeared in the 1981 première of Another Country - another play which successfully transferred to celluloid, having also won accolades in the West End.

In 2009, the theatre returned to producing, collaborating with a new company, Stage on Screen, to stage and film plays, making them available on DVD for theatre lovers and students. The first two productions were Dr Faustus and The School for Scandal, followed in 2010 by Volpone and The Duchess of Malfi. (The School for Scandal had first been presented in Greenwich by William Morton in 1884.)

In 2013, the Sell a Door Theatre Company partnered with the Greenwich Theatre following nine productions at the South London venue. James Haddrell and David Hutchinson officially announced the partnership on 19 November 2013.

In April 2015, it was announced that a revival of the Who's musical Tommy was to be performed at the venue from 29 July to 23 August 2015, its first London run for over 20 years.

== See also ==
- Greenwich Playhouse a studio style theatre in Greenwich (now closed).
