= Jasper Maskelyne =

British stage magician (1902–1973)

- Born: 29 September 1902; Wandsworth, London, England
- Died: 15 March 1973 (aged 70); Nairobi, Kenya
- Occupations: Stage magician Author
- Known for: Claimed deception and camouflage activities during World War II
- Parent(s): Nevil Maskelyne; Ada Mary Ardley
- Relatives: John Nevil Maskelyne (grandfather)
- Military career
- Allegiance: United Kingdom
- Branch: British Army
- Service years: 1939–1946
- Rank: Major
- Unit: Royal Engineers
- Conflicts: World War II

Jasper Maskelyne (29 September 1902 – 15 March 1973) was a British stage magician in the 1930s and 1940s. He was one of an established family of stage magicians, the son of Nevil Maskelyne and a grandson of John Nevil Maskelyne. He is most remembered for his accounts of his work for the British military during the Second World War, in which he claimed to have created large-scale ruses, deception, and camouflage in an effort to defeat the Nazis.

== Early life ==
Maskelyne was born in Wandsworth, London, England in 1902, to magician Nevil Maskelyne and his wife Ada Mary Ardley.

== Career ==
=== Stage magician ===
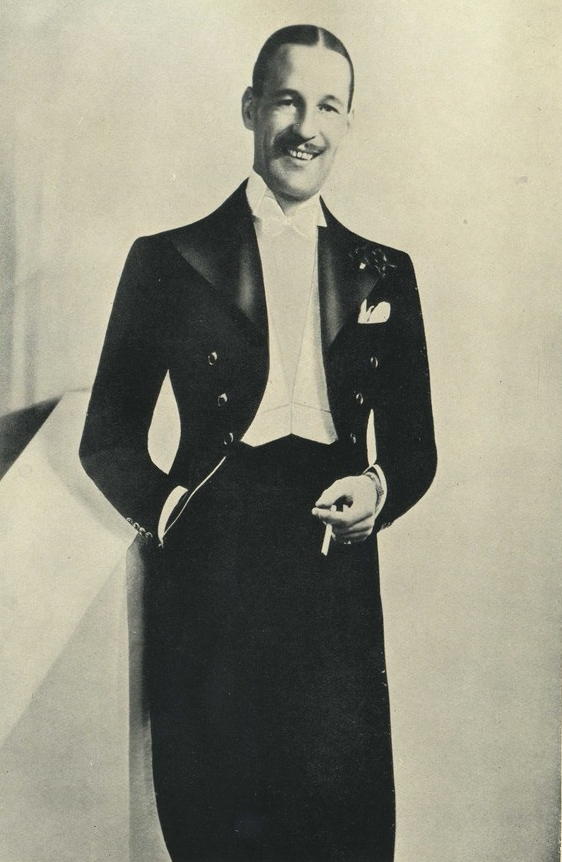
Maskelyne in formal evening wear, typical of his pre-war stage performances

Maskelyne was a successful stage magician. His 1936 Maskelyne's Book of Magic describes a range of stage tricks, including sleight of hand, card and rope tricks, and illusions of "mind-reading".

In 1937, Maskelyne appeared in a Pathé film, The Famous Illusionist, in which he performed his well-known trick of appearing to swallow razor blades.

=== Wartime service ===
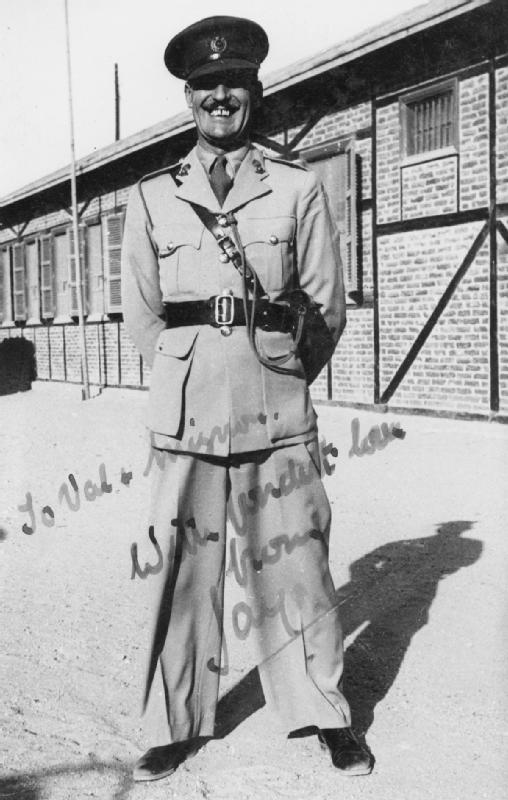
Maskelyne during his Army service

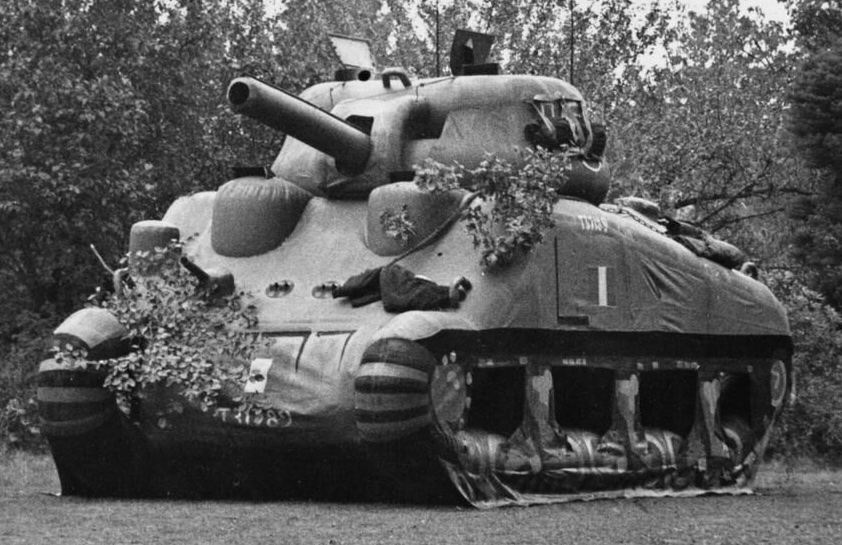
An inflatable dummy Sherman tank, one of many deceptions that Maskelyne claimed to have created

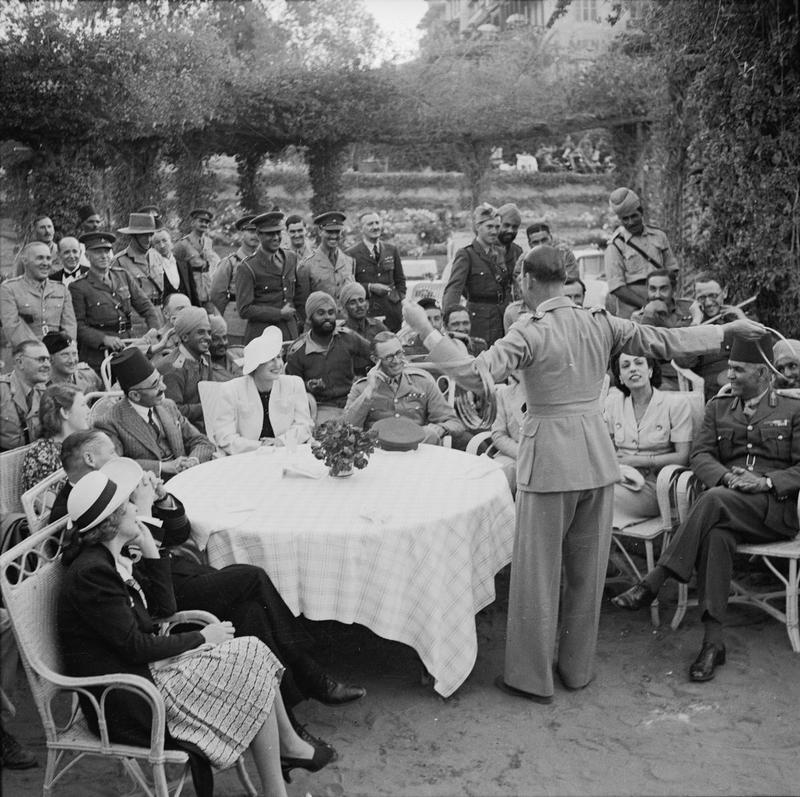
Maskelyne entertains Indian Army officers and civilian VIPs at Mena House in Cairo, 19 April 1942.

When the Second World War broke out, Maskelyne, believing his skills could be used for camouflage, joined the Royal Engineers. According to one account, he convinced sceptical officers, including inspector of training Viscount Gort, of his bona fides by camouflaging a machine gun position in plain sight and creating the illusion of the German warship Graf Spee on the Thames using mirrors and a model.

In 1940, Maskelyne was trained at the Camouflage Development and Training Centre at Farnham Castle. He found the training boring, asserting in his book that "a lifetime of hiding things on the stage" had taught him more about camouflage "than rabbits and tigers will ever know". The camoufleur Julian Trevelyan commented that he "entertained us with his tricks in the evenings" at Farnham, but that Maskelyne was "rather unsuccessful" at actually camouflaging "concrete pill-boxes".

Brigadier Dudley Clarke, the head of the 'A' Force deception department, recruited Maskelyne to work for MI9 in Cairo. He created small devices intended to assist soldiers to escape if captured and lectured on escape techniques. These included tools hidden in cricket bats, saw blades inside combs, and small maps on objects such as playing cards.

Maskelyne was then briefly a member of Geoffrey Barkas's camouflage unit at Helwan, near Cairo, set up in November 1941. He was made head of the subsidiary "Camouflage Experimental Section" at Abbassia. By February 1942, it became clear that this command was not successful, so he was "transferred to welfare"—in other words, to entertaining soldiers with magic tricks. Peter Forbes writes that the "flamboyant" magician's contribution was ...

... either absolutely central (if you believe his account and that of his biographer) or very marginal (if you believe the official records and more recent research).

There are several references to Maskelyne supporting the work of British double agent Eddie Chapman. Maskelyne was involved in making the de Havilland factory complex appear to have been damaged when viewed by German reconnaissance flights to help secure Chapman's trust with the Germans. This included scattering what appeared to be damaged aircraft, damage to main structures and damage to the airstrip.

His nature was "to perpetuate the myth of his own inventive genius, and perhaps he even believed it himself". However, Clarke had encouraged Maskelyne to take credit for two reasons: as cover for the true inventors of the dummy machinery and to encourage confidence in these techniques amongst Allied high command.

Maskelyne's ghost-written book about his exploits, Magic: Top Secret, was published in 1949. Forbes describes it as lurid, with "extravagant claims of cities disappearing, armies re-locating, dummies proliferating (even submarines)—all as a result of his knowledge of the magic arts". Forbes also notes that David Fisher, writing in his biography of Maskelyne, The War Magician, was "clearly under the wizard's spell". Maskelyne claimed in his book that his team produced ...

... dummy men, dummy steel helmets, dummy guns by the ten thousand, dummy tanks, dummy shell flashes by the million, dummy aircraft...

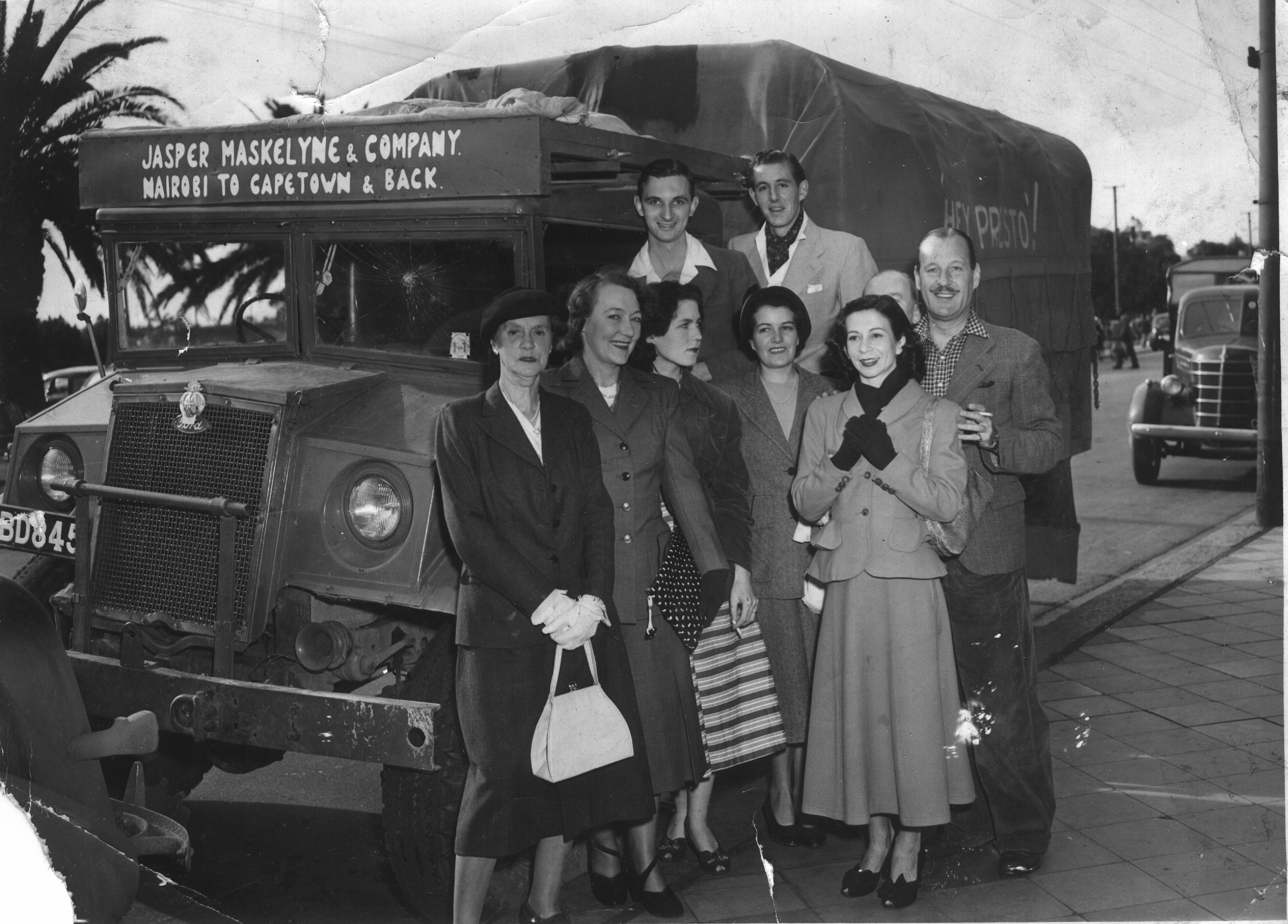
Jasper Maskelyne and his magic troupe departing from Nairobi in 1950. Jasper Maskelyne is on the right, touching the arm of Yvonne Helliwell, his stage assistant.

==== Doubts raised ====
According to magician Richard Stokes, Maskelyne's role in the war was marginal, much of the information presented in the books Magic: Top Secret and War Magician is pure invention, and no unit called the "Magic Gang" ever existed. Stokes contextualised them within contemporary literary and military sources, and the recollections of Jasper Maskelyne's surviving son, Alistair Maskelyne, in 21 articles from November 1997 to October 2005 for the Sydney-based Genii Magic Journal.

Christian House, reviewing Rick Stroud's book The Phantom Army of Alamein in The Independent, describes Maskelyne as "one of the more grandiose members" of the Second World War desert camouflage unit and "a chancer tasked with experimental developments, who fogged his own reputation as much as any desert convoy".

David Hambling, writing in Wired, critiques David Fisher's uncritical acceptance of Maskelyne's stories: "A very colourful account of Maskelyne's role is given in the book The War Magician—reading it you might think he won the war single-handed". Hambling denies Maskelyne's supposed concealment of the Suez Canal: "[I]n spite of the book's claims, the dazzle light[s] were never actually built (although a prototype was once tested)".

In the book on World War II deception, Ghosts of the ETO, Jonathan Gawne argued that Maskelyne was not responsible for all the deception work he claimed and that Dudley Clarke deserved the lion's share of credit. In 2002, The Guardian wrote: "Maskelyne received no official recognition. For a vain man this was intolerable and he died an embittered drunk. It gives his story a poignancy without which it would be mere chest-beating".

== Later life and death ==
After the war, Maskelyne resumed his magic career. In 1950 he moved to Africa, where he developed his show into a touring performance that travelled between South Africa and British possessions in East Africa. He eventually settled in Nairobi, where he founded a successful driving school. During the Mau Mau Uprising, Maskelyne led a mobile squad of police. In addition, he managed the Kenya National Theatre. Maskelyne died in Nairobi on 15 March 1973.

== Family ==
On 24 June 1926, Maskelyne married Evelyn Enid Mary Home-Douglas (died 24 March 1947), who had worked as a magician's assistant in his stage show. They were the parents of two children, son Alistair (1927–2019) and daughter Jasmine (born 1928), who was known as "Bobbie". On 11 March 1948 Maskelyne married Evelyne Mary Scotcher, who was known as Mary.

== Possible film adaptations ==
In 2003, director Peter Weir and actor Tom Cruise were working on a film based on The War Magician. When questions rose about how much of the story was factual and how much was invented by the author, the project was dropped while still in pre-production.

In 2015, Benedict Cumberbatch was reported as signing on to play the lead role in a Maskelyne film. At the time, the project was pending the selection of a director. In 2021, it was announced that Colin Trevorrow would direct War Magician, with Cumberbatch as the star.

== Works ==
- Maskelyne, Jasper; Groom, Arthur (1936), Maskelyne's Book of Magic, Harrap.
- Maskelyne, Jasper (1936), White Magic: The Story of Maskelynes, Stanley Paul.
- Maskelyne, Jasper; Stuart, Frank S. (1949), Magic: Top Secret, Stanley Paul.

== Sources ==
- Fisher, David (1983), The War Magician: The Incredible True Story of Jasper Maskelyne and His Magic Gang, Penguin (US; UK: Corgi, 1985)
- Forbes, Peter (2009), Dazzled and Deceived: Mimicry and Camouflage, Yale
- Mure, David (1980). Master of deception: tangled webs in London and the Middle East. W. Kimber. ISBN 0718302575.
- Newark, Tim (2007), Camouflage, Thames and Hudson, with Imperial War Museum
- Stroud, Rick (2012), The Phantom Army of Alamein: How the Camouflage Unit and Operation Bertram Hoodwinked Rommel, Bloomsbury
