= Nevil Maskelyne (magician) =

British magician and inventor

- Born: John Nevil Maskelyne; 1863; Cheltenham, Gloucestershire, England
- Died: 22 September 1924 (aged 61); Marylebone, London, England
- Occupation: Stage magician
- Spouse: Ada Mary Ardley (1863–1918)
- Children: Jasper Maskelyne
- Parents: John Nevil Maskelyne (1839–1917); Elizabeth Taylor (1840–1911)

John Nevil Maskelyne, known professionally as Nevil Maskelyne (1863–1924), was a British magician and inventor.

== Biography ==
Maskelyne was born in 1863 Cheltenham (bapt 22 July 1863) to stage magician John Nevil Maskelyne (1839-1917) and his wife Elizabeth née Taylor (1840-1911).

Following his father's death he assumed control of Maskelyne's Ltd.

In wireless telegraphy, he was the manager of Anglo-American Telegraph Company, which controlled the Valdemar Poulsen patents.

He was a public detractor of Guglielmo Marconi in the early days of radio (wireless). In 1903, he hacked into Marconi's demonstration of wireless telegraphy, and broadcast his own message, hoping to make Marconi's claims of "secure and private communication" appear foolish.

== Works ==
Footage of a total solar eclipse in 1900 taken by Maskelyne in North Carolina.

Maskelyne wrote several books on magic, including Our Magic: The Art in Magic, the Theory of Magic, the Practice of Magic (1911) ("the Practice of Magic" by David Devant) and On the Performance of Magic (a reprint of The Art in Magic section of Our Magic).

== Family and death ==
Maskelyne married Ada Mary Ardley (1863–1918) on 9 July 1888 at St Mary's Church, Battersea, London. They had five children:

- John Nevil ("Jack") Maskelyne (1892–1960), a noted author on railway matters and editor of Model Railway News in the early 20th century, and a prolific contributor to Model Engineer magazine.
- Clive Maskelyne (1894–1928), who succeeded his father as president of the Magic Circle.
- Noel Maskelyne (1899–1976), stage magician who joined the Maskelyne company after his father's death.
- Jasper Maskelyne (1902–1973), stage magician remembered for his accounts of using his magical abilities to deceive the Nazis.
- Mary Maskelyne (1902–2000), stepmother of the actress Joan Sterndale-Bennett

He died in Marylebone on 22 September 1924.
