= John Nevil Maskelyne =

English inventor and stage magician (1839–1917)

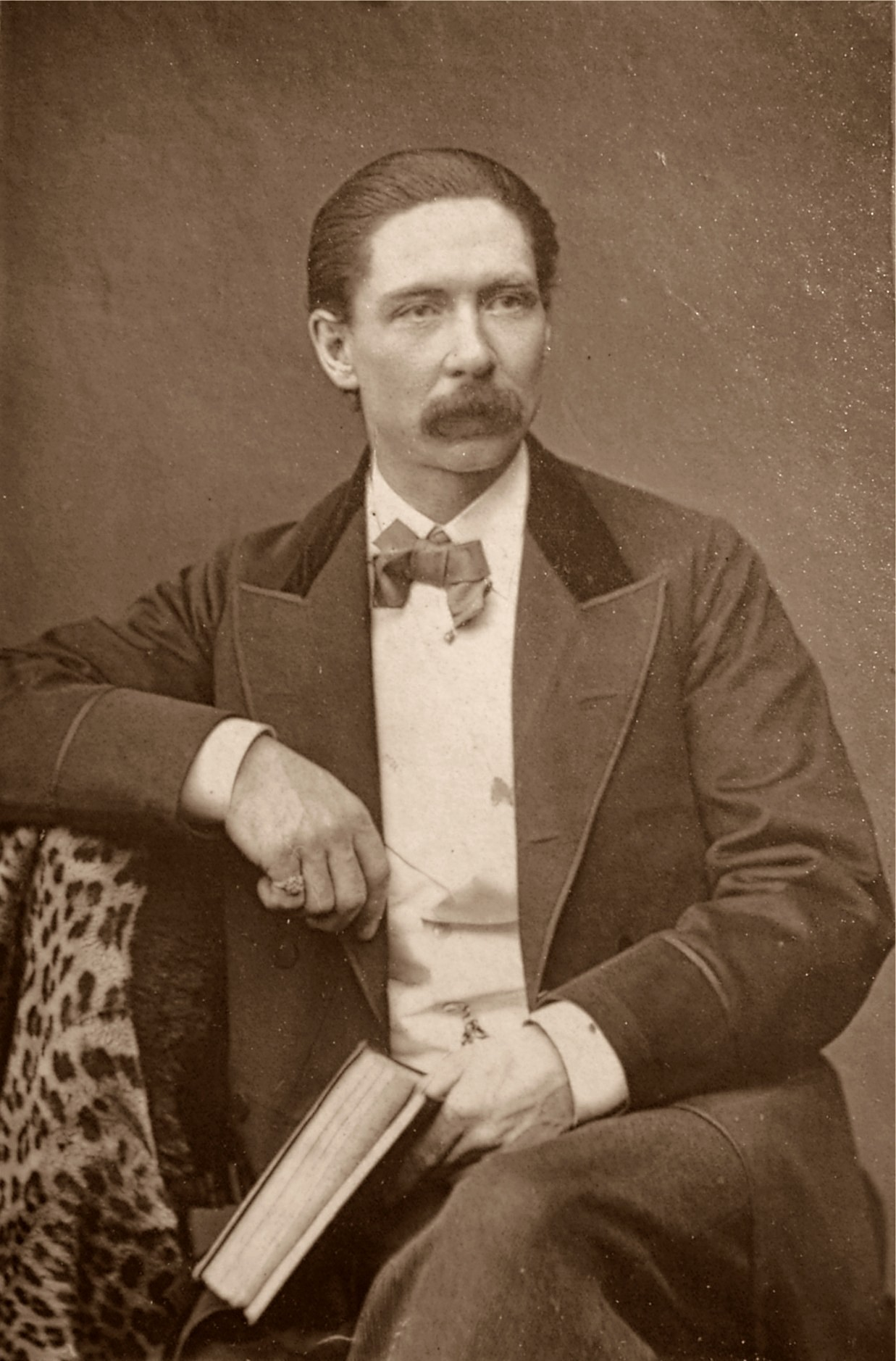
- Born: 22 December 1839; Cheltenham, Gloucestershire, England
- Died: 18 May 1917 (aged 77); Marylebone, London, England
- Occupations: Magician, escapologist, inventor, and paranormal investigator
- Spouse: Elizabeth Taylor (1840–1911)
- Children: Nevil Maskelyne
- Parents: John Nevil Maskelyne (1800–1875); Harriet Brunsdon (1812–1871)

John Nevil Maskelyne (22 December 1839 – 18 May 1917) was an English stage magician and inventor of the pay toilet, along with other Victorian-era devices. He worked with magicians George Alfred Cooke and David Devant, and many of his illusions are still performed today. His book Sharps and Flats: A Complete Revelation of the Secrets of Cheating at Games of Chance and Skill is considered a classic overview of card sharp practices. In 1914 he founded the Occult Committee, a group to "investigate claims to supernatural power and to expose fraud".

== Early life ==
Maskelyne was born on 22 December 1839 at Cheltenham, Gloucestershire, England to John Nevil Maskelyne (1800–1875), a saddler, and his wife Harriet (1812-1871), née Brunsdon. He was baptized at St Lawrence, Swindon, near, Cheltenham, on 26 January 1840. He trained as a watchmaker.

Maskelyne claimed to be a descendant of Nevil Maskelyne (1732–1811), the Astronomer Royal; although some sources repeat this, other recent biographical accounts establish otherwise.

== Career ==
Maskelyne became interested in conjuring after watching a stage performance at his local Town Hall by the fraudulent American spiritualists the Davenport brothers. He saw how the Davenports' spirit cabinet illusion worked, and stated to the audience in the theatre that he could recreate their act using no supernatural methods. With the help of a friend, cabinet maker George Alfred Cooke, he built a version of the gigantic cabinet. Together, they revealed the Davenport Brothers' trickery to the public at a show in Cheltenham in June 1865, sponsored by the 10th Cotswold Rifle Corps to which they belonged. In addition to the pseudo-spiritualist phenomena of the Davenports, they added comedy illusions which included the transformation of Maskelyne and Cooke into an "unprotected female" and a gorilla. Inspired by the acclaim they received for their clever exposure of the deception, the two men repeated their show several times.

Following their local success, they branched out taking their show to nearby towns. Encouraged by their results, they decided to become professional magicians and organised tours, building on their initial routines and expanding their programme.

At first they struggled to make ends meet but they were saved by a young and relatively inexperienced theatrical agent named William Morton, who saw their show in Liverpool and offered to finance a tour. He engaged them at a weekly wage of £4 10s for Maskelyne and his wife, and 50 shillings for Cooke. Morton ran them round the country for two years, ending at The Crystal Palace for several weeks. He then secured for them the Egyptian Hall in Piccadilly, renovated it, put in a new stage and opened at the end of 1873. Morton remained their manager for 20 years. He helped them to become firmly established on the national stage, including such marathon theatrical engagements as their famous 31-year tenancy at the Egyptian Hall, which ended in 1905 when the Hall was demolished.

During his performances, Maskelyne often incorporated his illusions into short plays. His performances at the Egyptian Hall influenced the magician and filmmaker Georges Méliès, whose short films incorporated special effects and illusions into short narratives.

=== Further achievements ===
Maskelyne and Cooke invented many illusions still performed today. Maskelyne was adept at working out the principles of illusions, one of his best-known being levitation. Levitation is commonly but incorrectly said to be Jean Eugène Robert-Houdin's creation, but it was Maskelyne's. The confusion arises because Robert-Houdin invented the illusion "La Suspension Ethéréenne" (aka the "Broom Suspension"). Levitation is also credited to American magician Harry Kellar, who in fact stole the illusion by bribing Maskelyne's technician, Paul Valadon.

On Cooke's death in February 1905, Maskelyne started a partnership with David Devant. Devant first joined Maskelyne's team in 1893 when he auditioned as a replacement for Charles Morritt, a conjurer and inventor who worked with Maskelyne at the Egyptian Hall but who left to set up his own show.

In 1894, Maskelyne wrote the book Sharps and Flats: A Complete Revelation of the Secrets of Cheating at Games of Chance and Skill. It became an instant hit, and to this day is considered a classic gambling book. It was the first detailed revelation of the secrets of cardsharps. Other authors prior to Maskelyne had written about crooked gambling, but never had anyone published a work with in-depth, detailed explanations of the secrets of crooked gambling. The first edition was published in London and New York. Later, when it entered the public domain, the Gambler's Book Club of Las Vegas published the first reprint. It is now also available online in the form of an annotated website. Maskelyne wrote several books, but Sharps and Flats is by far his most important and best known literary work.

== Scepticism ==
Maskelyne became attracted to conjuring after witnessing a Davenport brothers performance, which he and Cooke set out to establish as fraudulent. In contrast to the Davenport brothers, Maskelyne and Cooke were open about using conjuring tricks rather than supernatural abilities, referring to their show as an "entertainment of pure trickery". Maskelyne was a member of The Magic Circle and, like Harry Houdini, tried to dispel the notion of supernatural powers. To this end, in 1914 he founded the Occult Committee, to "investigate claims to supernatural power and to expose fraud". In particular, it attempted to prove that the Indian rope trick had never been performed.

Spiritualist Alfred Russel Wallace did not accept that Maskelyne had replicated the feats of the Davenport brothers utilizing natural methods, and stated that Maskelyne possessed supernatural powers. Maskelyne's observations of trickery at the Cambridge séance sittings in 1895 were important for the exposure of the medium Eusapia Palladino.

In 1876, Maskelyne was a witness in a fraud case against Henry Slade, a purported medium who was convicted at the end of the trial.

Maskelyne's writings criticising Spiritualism and Theosophy were included in the book The Supernatural? (1891) with psychiatrist Lionel Weatherly (1852–1940). It was an early text in the field of anomalistic psychology and offered rational explanations for occult and Spiritualistic practices, paranormal phenomena and religious experiences.

In 1910, Maskelyne debated Hiram Maxim in The Strand Magazine on the trickery of the Davenport brothers.

=== Inventions ===
With his son, John Nevil Maskelyne Jr., Maskelyne invented a typewriter whose types were inked by a pad and which typed proportionally (some characters receiving greater widths than others). This machine was probably introduced to the market in 1893. The 1897 Victoria model of the Maskelyne Typewriter introduced further refinements.

Maskelyne's invention of the door lock for London toilets required the insertion of a penny coin to operate it, leading to the euphemism to "spend a penny".

With John Algernon Clarke, Maskelyne invented the Psycho Automaton, a machine that could supposedly play Whist. At London's Egyptian Hall, Psycho appeared in more than 4,000 performances.

== Personal life ==
Maskelyne married Elizabeth Taylor (1840-1911) in Pershore in 1862. Their children were:

- Nevil Maskelyne (1863–1924)
- Minnie Jane Maskelyne (1866–1942)
- Edwin Archibald Maskelyne (1879–1920)

Nevil became the father of Jasper Maskelyne. Both Nevil and Jasper were magicians, and Jasper has been credited as a possible creator of large-scale ruses, deceptions and camouflage used during the Second World War.

== Death ==
Maskelyne died from pneumonia in 1917.

== Publications ==
- Maskelyne and Cooke: An Exposé of the Falseness of Their Pretensions (1873)
- Modern Spiritualism: A Short Account of its Rise and Progress, with Some Exposures of So-Called Spirit Media (1876) Reprinted in The Mediums and the Conjurors, 1976.
- (with) Lionel Weatherly The Supernatural? (1891, reprinted 2011)
- Sharps and Flats: A Complete Revelation of the Secrets of Cheating at Games of Chance and Skill (1894)
- Maxim Versus Maskelyne: A Complete Explanation of the Tricks of the Davenport Brothers and Their Imitators: The Cleverest Performance Ever Attributed to Supernatural Power. Maskelyne & Devant's Entertainment Bureau. Contains the following articles from The Strand Magazine:

Mr Fay's Cabinet Trick: A £20 Challenge to Mr Maskelyne.
Mr Maskelyne's Reply to Sir Hiram Maxim's Challenge.
Mr Maskelyne's Reply to Sir Hiram Maxim. Part I.
Mr Maskelyne's Reply to Sir Hiram Maxim. Part II.
Maxim Versus Maskelyne: The End of the Discussion.

- My Reminiscences (1910)
- The Fraud of Modern "Theosophy" Exposed (1912)
