= Paul Paray =

French musician (1886–1979)

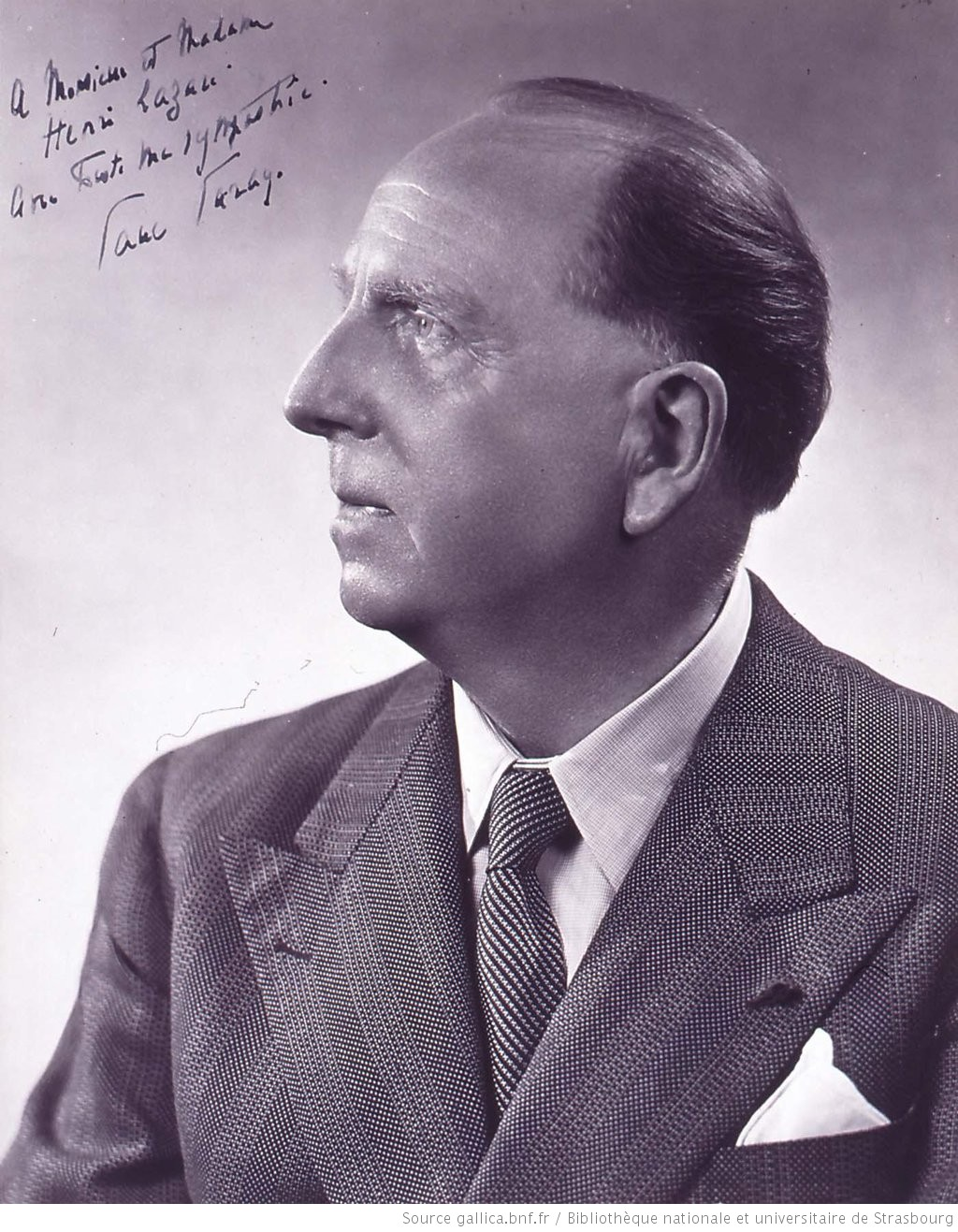
Paul Paray

Paul Marie-Adolphe Charles Paray (French: [pɔl paʁɛ]; 24 May 1886 – 10 October 1979) was a French conductor, organist and composer. After winning France's top musical award, the Prix de Rome, he fought in the First World War and was a prisoner of war for nearly four years. He held a succession of chief conductorships, including those of the Lamoureux and Colonne Orchestras in Paris and the Monte-Carlo Philharmonic Orchestra in Monaco. For ten years from 1952 he was chief conductor of the Detroit Symphony Orchestra, with which he made a celebrated series of recordings for Mercury Records' "Living Presence" series, many of which have been digitally released in the 21st century.

== Life and career ==
=== Early years ===
Paul Paray was born in Le Tréport, Normandy, on 10 October 1886, the second son and youngest of three children of Auguste Paray and his wife Hortense née Picard. Auguste's principal occupation was as an ivory sculptor, but he was also a working musician – organist of the church of Saint-Jacques au Tréport and musical director of the town's municipal band and theatre. He gave his three children their first music lessons. Both sons sang in the choir of Rouen Cathedral, for which, aged fourteen, Paray composed his first Magnificat, which his biographer David Patmore writes has remained in the choir's repertoire ever since.

With the help of Henri Dallier, organist of La Madeleine, Paris, Paray entered the Paris Conservatoire in 1904, where he studied harmony with Xavier Leroux and counterpoint and composition with Georges Caussade. He also studied with Charles Lenepveu and Paul Vidal. He played the piano, cello and timpani, but remained best known for his organ playing: in 1907 L'Ouest-Éclair, reporting a Saint Cecilia's Day concert, singled out Paray's organ playing for its perfection. After compulsory military service, not far from his home, in an infantry regiment in Dieppe, he accepted in 1909 the position of piano accompanist in the Parisian Cabaret des Quat'z'Arts an establishment directed by Gabriel Montoya. There he met Maurice Yvain, and became friends with several famous chansonniers of the time.

=== Prix de Rome and First World War ===
In 1911 Paray competed for France's most prestigious musical prize, the Prix de Rome and was awarded first prize for his cantata Yanitza by a jury that included Gabriel Fauré – director of the Conservatoire – and other composers including Camille Saint-Saëns, Charles-Marie Widor and Gabriel Pierné. Paray won the first prize with nineteen out of twenty votes.

The Prix de Rome brought with it two years' residence and study at the Villa Medici, the French Academy in Rome. Shortly after his return to Paris the First World War broke out and Paray was conscripted into the French army. He was taken prisoner after two months' fighting and held in an internment camp at Darmstadt until the end of the war in 1918. He refused any musical collaboration with the Germans and he had no instrument, except for the modest harmonium he played on Sundays, to accompany the two religious services for Catholic and Protestant prisoners. Denied paper, he composed in his head, and after the war he transcribed the string quartet he had conceived while a prisoner.

=== Conductor ===
After his release, Paray conducted professionally for the first time at the Casino in Cauterets, and shortly afterwards, on Pierné's recommendation, he made his début with the Lamoureux Orchestra in Paris and was appointed its assistant conductor in 1920. Camille Chevillard, the orchestra's principal conductor since 1897, died in May 1923; Paray was elected to succeed him. He remained with the orchestra for five years, including in his programmes the works of many French composers of the late nineteenth and early twentieth centuries, such as Fauré, Debussy, Ravel and Ibert, whose Escales he and the orchestra premiered in 1924, before it was taken up by better-known conductors including Arturo Toscanini and Leopold Stokowski. They also performed with several well-known solo players who were making their Paris débuts, including Jascha Heifetz, Nathan Milstein and Yehudi Menuhin.

In 1928 Paray accepted the post of chief conductor of the Monte-Carlo Philharmonic Orchestra and in the summer months he was also musical director at the Vichy Casino. In 1933 he moved to the Colonne Orchestra in Paris, succeeding Pierné as its chief conductor. He also worked at the Paris Opéra, where he conducted several operas by Wagner, including Die Walküre, Siegfried and Tristan und Isolde. While with the Colonne Orchestra, Paray engaged in a celebrated dispute with the music critic Émile Vuillermoz, who complained in print in 1935 about what he saw as the frequent inadequacy of the performances of new works at symphony concerts. From the Colonne platform Paray denounced Vuillermoz as hypocritical and venal.

=== 1939–1952 ===
The French government sent Paray to America to represent France at the 1939 World’s Fair, conducting the New York Philharmonic Orchestra. He made a sufficiently strong impression to be offered the post of co-conductor of the NBC Symphony Orchestra with Toscanini, but chose to return to France, just as the Second World War was about to start. The Colonne and Lamoureux Orchestras had merged to form a single ensemble, and Paray agreed to share its musical direction jointly with Eugène Bigot. After the German invasion of France in 1940 the Nazi administration wished to drop the name Colonne because the orchestra's founder, Edouard Colonne, was of Jewish descent. Paray resigned and refused to appear again in occupied Paris. In Limoges and Marseille in Vichy France he conducted French Radio's Orchestre National. Asked to identify the Jewish members of the orchestra, he refused, resigned and moved to neutral Monaco. According to Patmore, in Monte Carlo Paray helped many musicians and became an active member of the French resistance. He later criticised other musicians, most conspicuously Charles Munch and Arthur Honegger, who remained in Paris; the biographer D. Kern Holoman gives a different angle on this, writing that Paray stayed safely in Monte Carlo while Munch and Honegger, despite impeccable and personally dangerous anti-Nazi credentials, had the more challenging time by remaining in Paris. After a lawsuit, Paray had to retract his defamations and apologise. Holoman attributes Paray's animus against Munch to "simple jealousy" of the latter's professional eminence, outstripping his own.

Paray married his long-term partner, Yolande Falck in 1942. Returning to Paris after the Liberation he once again directed the Colonne Orchestra between 1945 and 1952. He toured Europe with the Vienna Philharmonic. He conducted the Israel Philharmonic Orchestra in 1949 and was invited back every year, continuing to appear with the orchestra until shortly before his death. Following a successful appearance in America in 1951 with the recently reconstituted Detroit Symphony Orchestra, he was appointed as the orchestra's chief conductor with effect from 1952.

=== Detroit: 1952–1962 ===
For his first three years at Detroit, Paray managed to divide his activities between the US and Europe, but from 1956 he made his home in Detroit. He left the Colonne Orchestra (succeeded by Munch) and restricted his returns to France to two annual series of concerts, mainly with the Orchestre National de France. In Detroit – and also in Pittsburgh, New York and Philadelphia, where he was regularly invited – Paray took satisfaction in conducting, along with mainstream classical works, music by American and Canadian composers including Aaron Copland, Samuel Barber, Ned Rorem and Walter Piston.

In Detroit, Paray made a series of recordings, served by the new "Living Presence" technique of the Mercury record company – developed by Robert Fine and Wilma Cozart Fine – which were bestsellers in the United States, and were soon distributed worldwide. In October 1956 he conducted the inaugural concert at the Ford Auditorium in Detroit, in a programme that included his own Mass for the 500th Anniversary of the death of Joan of Arc. He retired from the chief conductorship at Detroit in 1962 and was given the title of Emeritus Conductor. He returned to the orchestra for four weeks each year, from his home in Monte Carlo.

=== Later years: 1962–1979 ===
As a freelance, Paray was continually invited to conduct major symphony orchestras in France and mainland Europe and in North America. At the age of 79 he conducted the Orchestre National de l'Opéra de Monte-Carlo on a tour of 43 concerts throughout the United States and Canada, from February to April 1966. A year later, replacing Munch at short notice, he took the Orchestre de Paris to Kiev, Moscow, Leningrad and Riga.

In July 1977, at the age of 91, Paray conducted an orchestral concert in honour of Marc Chagall's 90th birthday celebrations in Nice. Shortly after conducting a concert in which his old friend Menuhin was soloist, Paray died in Monte Carlo on 10 October 1979 aged 93. At his wish, he was buried in the cemetery of his native Le Tréport.

== Reputation ==
=== Composer ===
Baker's Biographical Dictionary of Musicians describes Paray as "the composer of several highly competent works" including Yanitza, the Mass, the Violin Sonata, a Cello Sonata (1919) a ballet – Artémis troublée (1922), a Fantasie for piano and orchestra (1923) and two symphonies (1935 and 1940). Grove's Dictionary of Music and Musicians comments, "As a composer he tended towards academic propriety".

=== Conductor ===
According to Grove, Paray gained a reputation as "a reliable conductor in a wide range of the classical repertory". The British magazine Gramophone, reviewing the release of his Mercury recordings on 45 CDs, classed him as a great conductor and said that he created a magnificent ensemble during his ten years as the Detroit Symphony Orchestra's music director. The New York Times said of him, "He was credited with establishing the Detroit Symphony as a thoroughly professional ensemble of national stature, and within two years after taking it over, he brought it to New York for its first concert here". The same paper remarked "Mr Paray limited his conducting of 20th‐century works to those of a conservative stamp".

=== Honours ===
Paray was elected to the Académie des Beaux-Arts in 1950. His awards included a doctorate of law from Wayne State University, the City Medal from Tel Aviv, and honorary citizenships of Detroit, Diemeringen, Le Tréport and Monaco. He was named a Grand Officer of the Order of Grimaldi in 1967, and awarded the Grand Cross of the National Order of Merit in 1971. In the Legion of Honour, like Saint-Saëns and Fauré before him, he was promoted to the highest rank, Grand Cross.

== Selected works ==
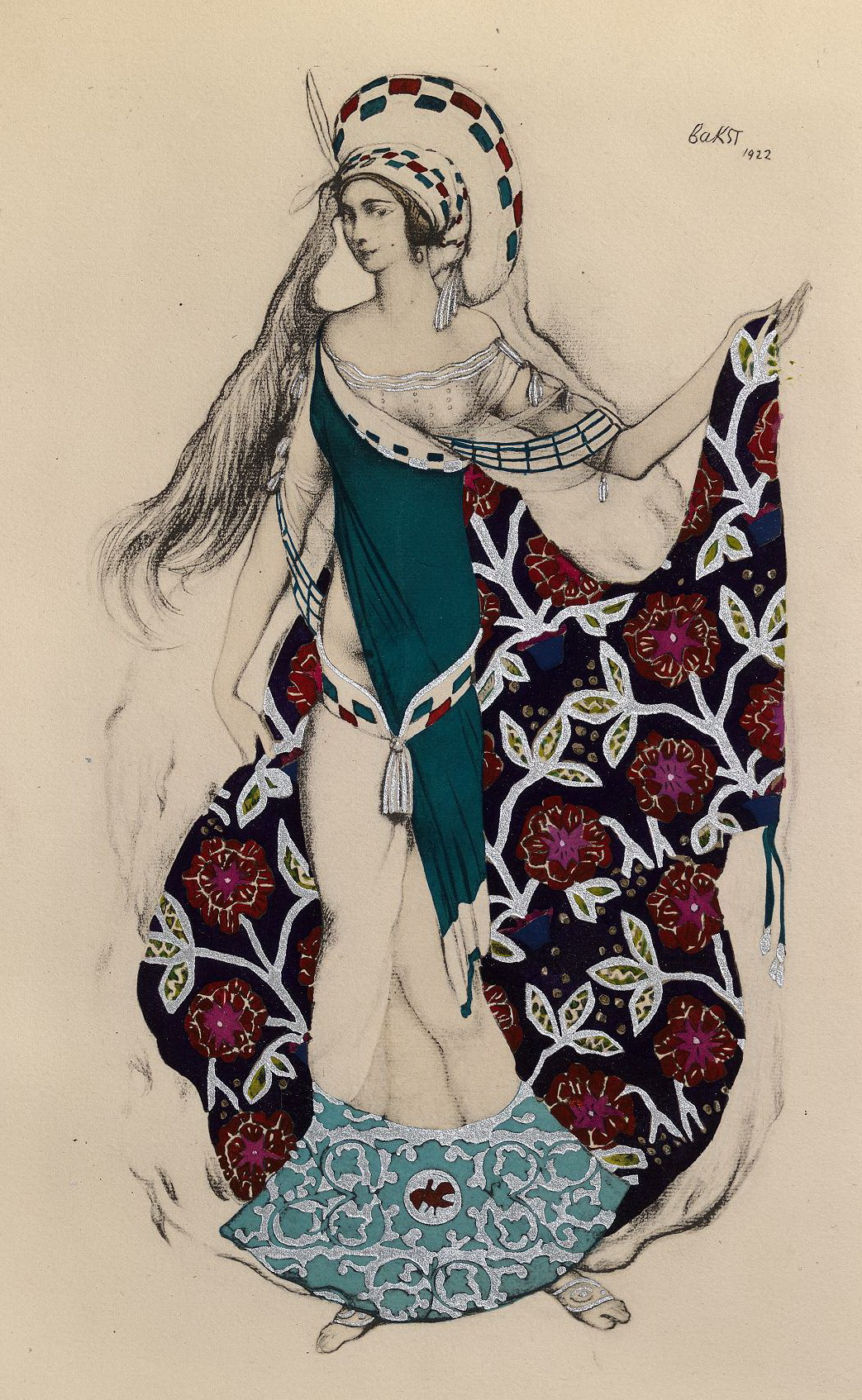
Sketch for Artémis troublée by Léon Bakst

Stage

- Yanitza, Scène lyrique d'après une légende albanaise (1911); poem by Georges Spitzmuller
- Artémis troublée, ballet by Ida Rubinstein, costumes by Léon Bakst (1911–1912)

Orchestral

- Symphonie d'archets for string orchestra (1919); orchestration of the string quartet
- Nocturne for chamber orchestra
- Symphony No. 1 in C major (1934)
- Symphony No. 2 in A major (1936)

Concertante

- Fantaisie for piano and orchestra (1909)
- Humoresque for violin and chamber orchestra (1910)

Chamber music

- Piano Trio (1905)
- Sérénade for violin (or flute) and piano (1908)
- Sonata in C minor for violin and piano (1908)
- Humoresque for violin and piano (or chamber orchestra) (1910)
- Nocturne for violin (or cello) and piano (1910)
- String Quartet in E minor (1919)
- Sonata No. 1 in B♭ major for cello and piano (1919)
- Sonata No. 2 in C major for cello and piano

Piano

- Tarantelle
- Scherzetto
- Impromptu
- Vertige
- Incertitude
- Entêtement
- Berceuse
- Valse-caprice (1906)
- Romance (1909)
- Portraits d'enfants (1910)
- Valse sur un thème de Franz Schubert (1911)
- Impressions (1912)

1. Nostalgie
2. Eclaircie
3. Primesaut

- Reflets romantiques (1912)

1. Avec esprit et charme
2. Ardemment
3. En rêvant
4. Avec fougue
5. Souple
6. Léger
7. Tender
8. Energique

- Sept pièces (1913)
- Presto (1913)
- Prélude, scherzo et allegro
- Thème et variations (1913)
- Prélude in F major (1913)
- Allegro (1913)
- Scherzo (1913)
- D'une âme... (1914)
- Pieces for piano 4-hands (1914)
- Éclaircie (1923)
- Prélude (1930)
- Allegretto
- Prélude en mi bémol mineur
- Prélude en fa mineur
- Sur la mer
- Valse en fa dièse mineur
- Valse en fa mineur
- Vertige
- La vraie furlana

Vocal

- Nuit d'Italie for voice and piano; words by Paul Bourget
- Laurette for voice and piano; words by Alfred de Vigny
- Sépulcre for voice and piano; words by Leon Volade
- Paroles à la lune for voice and piano (1903); words by Anna de Noailles
- Panis Angelicus for voice and cello (1904)
- Dans les bois for voice and piano (1904); words by Gérard de Nerval
- La Promesse for voice and piano or orchestra (1910); words by Gabriel Montoya
- La Plainte for voice and piano or orchestra (1911); words by Lucien Paté
- Le Papillon for voice and piano or orchestra (1911); words by Jean Aicard
- Le Champ de bataille (1912); words by Théophile Gautier
- Trois Mélodies for voice and piano or orchestra (1912); words by Théophile Gautier

1. Infidélité
2. La Dernière feuille
3. Serment

- Villanelle for voice and piano or orchestra (1912); words by Théophile Gautier
- Chanson violette for voice and piano or orchestra (1913); words by Albert Samain
- Le Chevrier for voice and piano or orchestra (1913); words by José-Maria de Heredia
- Il est d'étranges soirs for voice and piano or orchestra (1913) words by Albert Samain
- Viole for voice and piano (1913); words by Albert Samain
- In manus tuas for voice, oboe and organ (1914)
- Quatre poèmes de Jean Lahor for voice and piano or orchestra (1921)

1. Après l'orage
2. Adieux
3. Après le bal
4. Dèsir de mort

- Vocalise-étude for medium voice and piano (1924)
- Le Poèt et la muse for voice and piano; words by E. Thévenet
- L'Embarquement pour l'idéal for voice and piano; words by Catulle Mendès
- Mortes les fleurs for voice and piano; words by P. May
- Chanson napolitaine for voice and piano; words by P. May

Choral

- Os Justi, Offertorium for chorus and organ (1903)
- Acis et Galatée, Cantata (1910)
- Jeanne d'Arc, Oratorio (1913); words by Gabriel Montoya
- Salve Regina for chorus a cappella (1929)
- Messe du cinquième centenaire de la mort de Jeanne d'Arc (Mass for the Fifth Centenary of the Death of Joan of Arc) for soloists, chorus and orchestra (1931)
- Nuit tombante for chorus and orchestra
- Pastorale de Noël pour for soloists, chorus and orchestra
- Soleils de septembre for chorus and orchestra

Source: Cercle Paul Paray.

=== Sources ===
- Holoman, D. Kern (2012). Charles Munch. New York: Oxford University Press. ISBN 978-0-19-977270-4.
- Mousnier, Jean-Philippe (1998). Paul Paray: Les grands chefs d'orchestre. Paris: Editions L'Harmattan. ISBN 978-2-73-846352-4.
- Slonimsky, Nicolas; Laura Kuhn, eds. (2001). Baker's Biographical Dictionary of Music and Musicians. Vol. 4. New York: Schirmer. ISBN 978-0-02-865530-7.

Cultural offices
| Preceded by Camille Chevillard | Principal Conductors, Lamoureux Orchestra; 1923–1928 | Succeeded by Albert Wolff |
| Preceded by none | Music Directors, Israel Philharmonic Orchestra; 1949–1950 | Succeeded by Jean Martinon |
