= Tuaillon =

Tuaillon is a surname. Notable people with the surname include:

- Auguste Tuaillon (1873–1907), French dwarf chansonnier
- Louis Tuaillon (1862–1919), Prussian sculptor
