= Artificial tree =

Artificial or fake trees may refer to:

- Artificial plants
- Artificial Christmas trees
- Artificial trees used for Carbon dioxide removal#Direct air capture with carbon sequestration (DACCS)
- Camouflage trees - World War I military technology
- Fake Plastic Trees, a song by Radiohead
