= Gabriel Montoya =

French physician, singer and lyricist (1868–1914)

Gabriel Montoya (20 October 1868, in Alès – 7 October 1914, in Castres) was a French singer, chansonnier and lyricist. The son of a pharmacist, Joseph-Henri-Victor Montoya and Noémie- Victoire Coste, he studied medicine in Lyon. After a trip to the West Indies in 1893, he settled in Paris where he enrolled in 1899 at the university and graduated a physician. An enthusiastic amateur singer, he joined up at night in coffee houses, where he attracted Rodolphe Salis's attention who engaged him (for free) at Le Chat Noir in Montmartre. In 1902, he toured with the troupe led by Yvette Guilbert, "Monmartre en ballade in Berlin".

In Paris, he became a famous singer. His lyrics were set to music by composers such as Paul Paray, Gaston Maquis, Yann Nibor, Marie Krysinda and Edmond Missa. In addition, he also wrote numerous plays that were seldom performed.

In 1907 and 1908, he recorded a dozen songs for the recording company Association phonique des grands artistes, including Les Veuves du Luxembourg and Mimi (music by Gaston Maquis).

Following the closure of Le Chat Noir he became director of the Cabaret des Quat'z'Arts in 1910. In 1914 he was killed aged 45 in a bicycle accident on the road leading from Dax to Castres.

== Bibliography ==
- Chantal Brunschwig, Louis-Jean Calvet, Jean-Claude Klein, Cent ans de chanson française, Seuil, 1972 (1st ed.) ; ré-éd. poche (coll. Points actuels), 1981 ISBN 2-02-00-2915-4
- Christian Zwarg, Firmendiscographine (catalogues phonographiques, formats XL loadables)
- Léon de Bercy, Montmartre et ses chansonniers - Paris 1902.
- Bertrand Millanvoye, Anthologie des poètes de Montmartre - Paris 1909.
- Henri Fursy, Mon petit bonhomme de chemin - Paris 1928.
- Pascal Pia, Bouquet poétique des Médecins, Chirurgiens, Dentistes et Apothicaires - Paris - Collection de l'Ecritoire - 1933.
