= Maurice Yvain =

French composer (1891–1965)

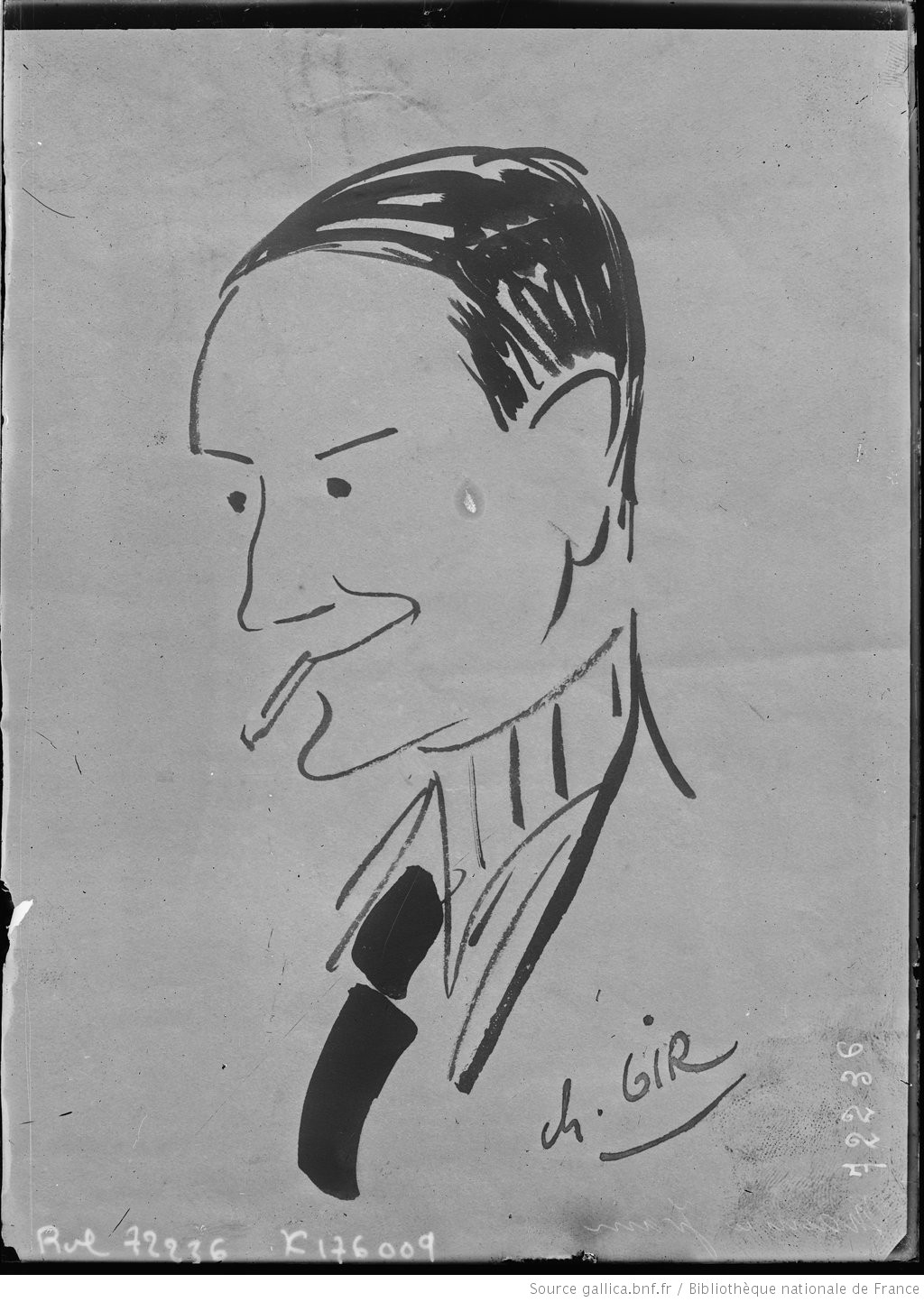
- Born: 12 February 1891; Paris, France
- Died: 27 July 1965 (aged 74); Neuilly-sur-Seine, France

Maurice Yvain (12 February 1891 – 27 July 1965) was a French composer noted for his operettas of the 1920s and 1930s. Some of which were written for Mistinguett, at one time the best-paid female entertainer in the world. In the 1930s and 1940s, he became a major success in the United States and several of his pieces appeared in the famous Ziegfeld Follies on Broadway. He also composed music for several films of notable directors such as Anatole Litvak, Julien Duvivier, and Henri-Georges Clouzot. Yvain's music blended with the then "spirit of Paris".

== Biography ==
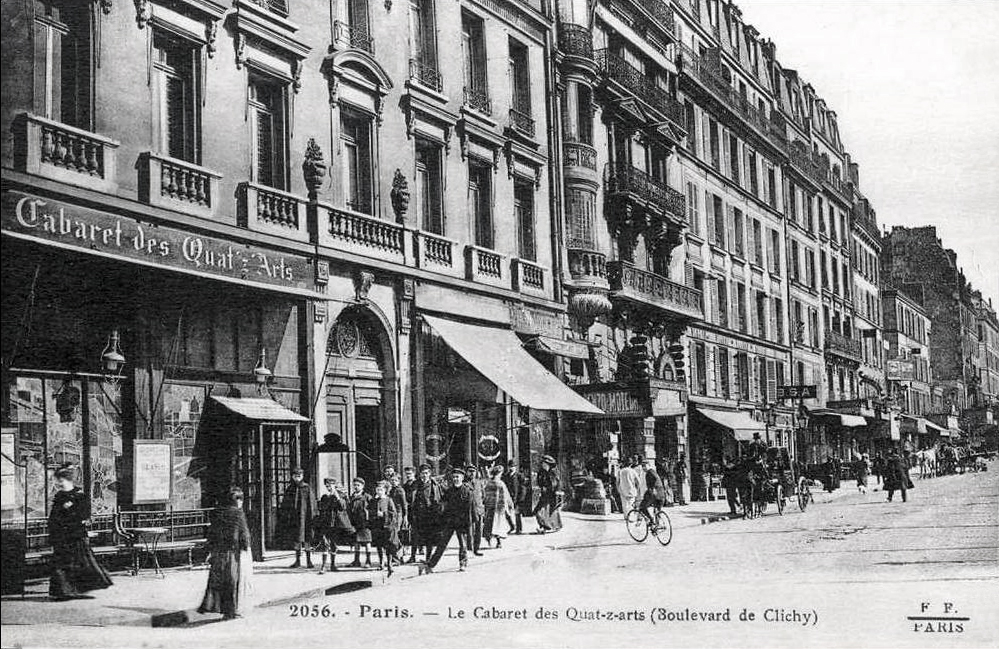
Cabaret des Quat'z'Arts

Maurice Yvain was born in 1891 into a musical family in Paris. He was educated by his father, who played the trumpet in the Orchestre de l'Opéra-Comique. From 1903, he studied at the Conservatoire de Paris where he was a pupil of Louis Diemer and Xavier Leroux. An excellent pianist, he first played as an accompanying pianist at the Casino d'Évian. He went on to play with the orchestra at the Casino de Monte Carlo and in the Parisien Cabaret des Quat'z'Arts.

After military service from 1912 to 1919, he returned to Paris where he started to compose songs for light music, operettas, musicals, for films such as Vincent Scotto and Henri Christiné. One of his early successes was "Dansez-vous le foxtrot" in 1919. Maurice Chevalier, whom he had met in the army, introduced him to Albert Willemetz and to the popular Mistinguett who sang one of his best-known songs "Mon Homme" ("My Man") (1920). In 1968, it was sung by Barbra Streisand in the film Funny Girl. He composed several other pieces for Mistinguett, including "En douce" (1920), "La Java" (1922), "J'en ai marre" (1922) and "La Belote" (1925). In the 1920s, he began to compose operettas, 18 in all; his satirical “Ta Bouche” (Your Mouth, 1922) of 1922 was a particular success. The sequels which followed were the "Pas sur la Bouche" (Not on the Mouth, 1925) and the "Bouche a Bouche" (Mouth to Mouth, 1925) and both further established the musical virtuosity of Yvain; the former song rendered by Regine Flory made her also a celebrity. Thereafter, he also wrote great sentimental operettas such as "Chanson gitane" ("Gypsy Song"), many of which were performed at the Théâtre des Bouffes Parisiens. His pieces are characterized by rhythmic precision, imagination and flexibility of musical phrases. A. Willemetz, Jacques-Charles, H. Varna and H. Heanson were his lyricists and librettists. Occasionally he also wrote the lyrics.

In the 1930s, his operettas were almost immediately translated and performed in Germany, Hungary and Austria as well as on Broadway where Ta Bouche was presented over a hundred times. Thanks to his success in the United States, several of his pieces appeared in the famous Ziegfeld Follies on Broadway. His "Mon Homme" featured in the 1936 MGM Academy Award-winning film The Great Ziegfeld. He composed music for several films of notable directors such as Anatole Litvak, Julien Duvivier and Henri-Georges Clouzot. Yvain died in 1965 in Suresnes, near Paris.

== Works ==
Maurice Yvain's "Catalog of Works" consisted of 25 soundtracks, 21 titles as composer, one title of Indochine (composer of the song "La môme Caoutchouc" 1992). Some of these works are:

- 1919 – "Pour être heureux", sung by Polaire
- 1920 – "En douce", song created for Mistinguett
- 1920 – "Rien qu'un baiser" sung by Félix Mayol et Dalbret
- 1920 – "Mon homme", song created for Mistinguett
- 1920 – "Si tu ne veux pas payer d'impôts", song created for Dréan
- 1920 – "J'n'ose pas", song created for Maurice Chevalier
- 1920 – "Cach' ton piano", song created for Dréan
- 1920 – "Tout en dansant le fox-trot", song created for Maurice Chevalier
- 1920 – "L'un dans l'autre", song created for Maurice Chevalier
- 1921 – Ta Bouche, libretto by Yves Mirande and A. Silent
- 1921 – "Avec le sourire", song created for Maurice Chevalier
- 1923 – Là-Haut, opéra bouffe, libretto by Yves Mirande and Albert Willemetz with Maurice Chevalier and Dranem
- 1922 – "La Java", song created for Mistinguett
- 1922 – "J'en ai marre", song created for Mistinguett
- 1924 – Gosse de Riche (Rich Kid), musical comedy, libretto by J. Bousquet and H. Falk
- 1924 – La Dame en décolleté (The Lady in cleavage), libretto by Yves Mirande and Lucien Boyer
- 1925 - Pas sur la bouche (Not on the lips), libretto by André Barde and Maurice Yvain
- 1925 – "La Belote", song created for Mistinguett
- 1925 – Un bon garcon, combining music and theatre, music and lyrics by Yvain
- 1927 – "Dites-moi ma mère", song created for Maurice Chevalier
- 1928 – Les Ailes (Wings), musical revue, libretto by Albert Willemetz, A. Mouézy-Eon and Saint-Granier
- 1928 – Yes, libretto by P. Soulaine, R. Pujol and Albert Willemetz
- 1928 – "Je t'emmène à la campagne", song created for Georges Milton
- 1928 – "Charmantes choses", sung by Florelle
- 1929 – Elle est à vous, libretto by André Barde
- 1929 – "Pouêt-Pouêt", song created for Georges Milton
- 1931 – Paris qui brille, libretto by H. Varna with Mistinguett
- 1932 – "J'ai pas su y faire", sung by Yvonne George
- 1932 – "La môme caoutchouc", sung by Jean Gabin then in 1935 by Fréhel
- 1933 – Oh! Papa, libretto by André Barde
- 1934 – La Belle histoire, libretto by Henri-Georges Clouzot based on Perrault's Le Chat Botté (Puss in Boots)
- 1935 – Au Soleil du Mexique, operetta, libretto bye Albert Willemetz and A. Mouézy-Eon
- 1935 – "C'est toujours ça de pris", song created for Marie Dubas
- 1935 – Aux portes de Paris, film music
- 1935 – Sans famille, film music
- 1935 – Vacances, operetta, libretto by H. Duvernois and André Barde
- 1936 – Les deux gamines, film musique
- 1937 – Vents (Winds), ballet for the Universal Exposition
- 1947 – Chanson gitane (Gypsy song), libretto by Louis Poterat
- 1949 – "Le chant des étoiles"
- 1950 - Snowhite
- 1953 – Toutes les femmes (All Women), libretto by Albert Willemetz
- 1958 – Le Corsaire Noir (The Black Corsair), libretto by J. Valmy, created in Marseille

He has also rendered 100 dance and dance songs.

== Books ==
- 1962. My beautiful operetta [memories]. Paris: The Round Table.

== Bibliography ==
- Lamb, Andrew (2000). 150 Years of Popular Musical Theatre. Yale University Press. p. 198. ISBN 978-0-300-07538-0.
