= Louis Abel-Truchet =

French painter (1857–1918)

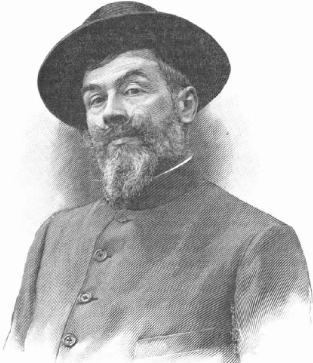
- Born: 29 December 1857; Versailles
- Died: 9 September 1918 (aged 60); Auxerre
- Education: Académie Julian
- Occupations: Painter and poster artist
- Movement: Société des humoristes

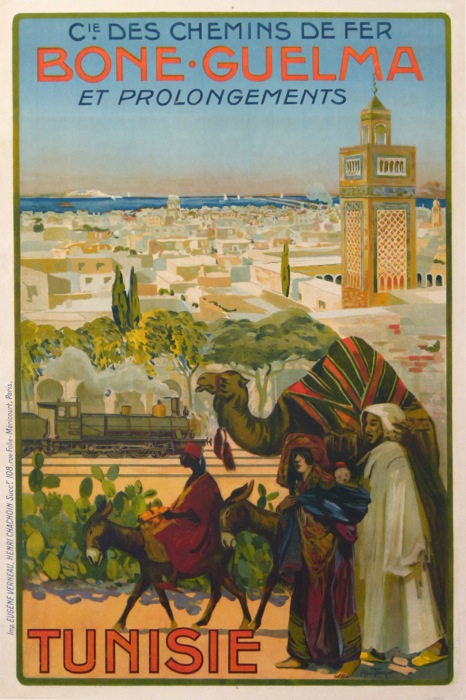
Poster for the Bône-Guelma Railway, Tunisia

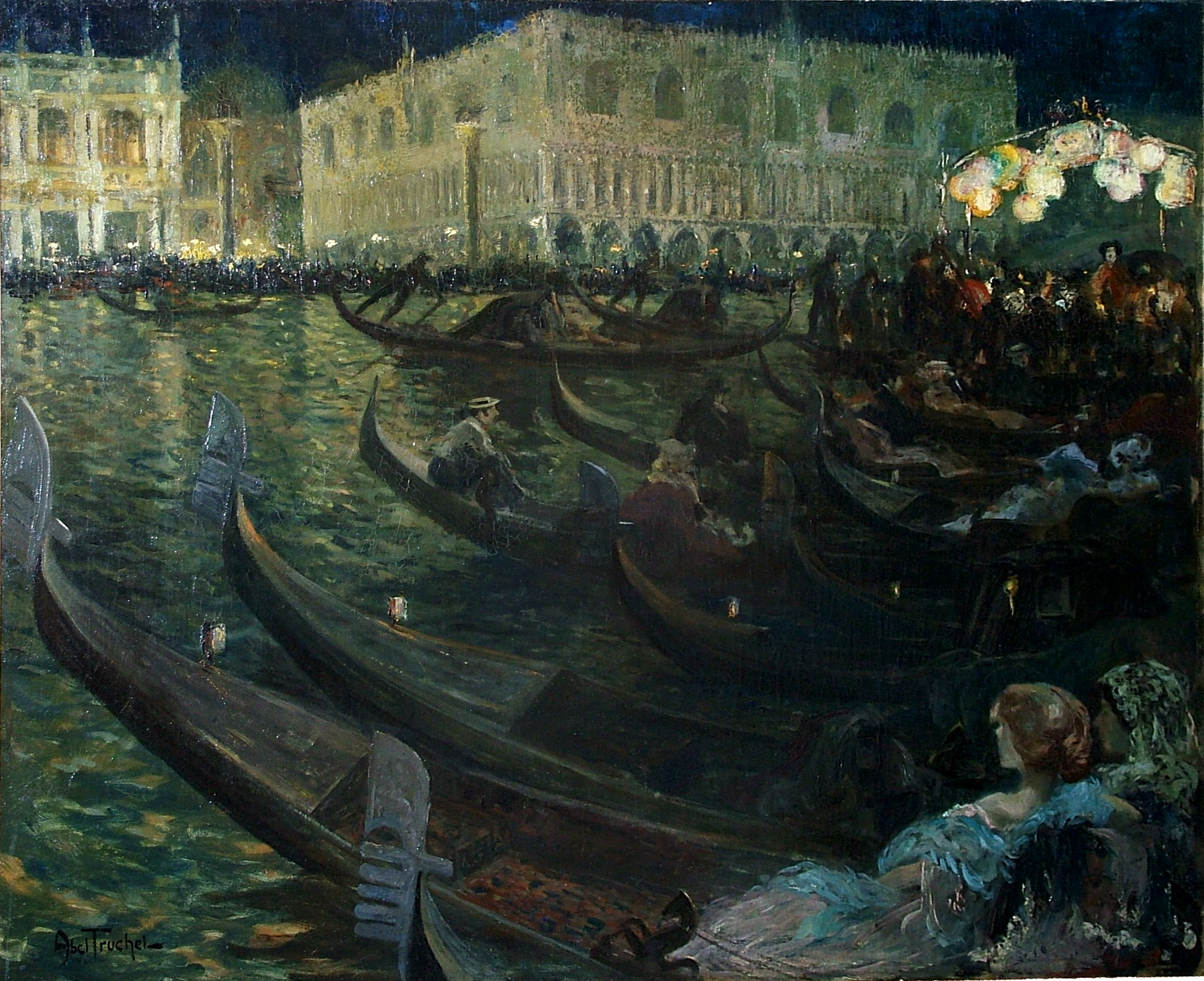
Festa del Redentore, Venice

Louis Abel-Truchet (29 December 1857 – 9 September 1918) was a French painter and poster artist. He was known for landscapes, genre scenes and depictions of Parisian nightlife.

== Biography ==
He was a student of Jean-Joseph Benjamin-Constant and Jules Lefebvre at the Académie Julian. His first exhibition came in 1891. He was one of the first exhibitors at the Salon d'Automne in 1903. He and Louis Vallet created the "Société des humoristes" in 1907.

In 1910, he became a member of the Société Nationale des Beaux-Arts. The following year, he was named a Knight in the Legion of Honor.

In addition to his artistic works, he created designs for public festivities, notably the satirical Vachalcades of 1896 and 1897; designing floats for the Cabaret des Quat'z'Arts.

During World War I, he served as a volunteer with the rank of Lieutenant in the 1er régiment du génie (Engineering). The army made use of his skills as a painter by appointing him as an assistant to Guirand de Scevola, head of the newly created Camouflage Division. He initially worked in Paris, helping to organize the central workshop. During this time, he continued to work as an artist, drawing caricatures for Le Petit Journal.

Shortly before the end of the war, he was wounded and died at a military hospital in Auxerre. In 1919, his works were part of an exhibit at the Salon d'Automne, honoring artists who had died in the war.

After his death, his widow, the painter Julia Abel-Truchet, took over his workshop in Montmartre and became a portrait painter.

His works may be seen at the Musée Gallé-Juillet, Musée de Grenoble, Musée d'art moderne André-Malraux, Musée Carnavalet and the Musée des Beaux-Arts de Pau. A street in the 17th arrondissement of Paris is named after him.
