= Auguste Tuaillon =

French actor

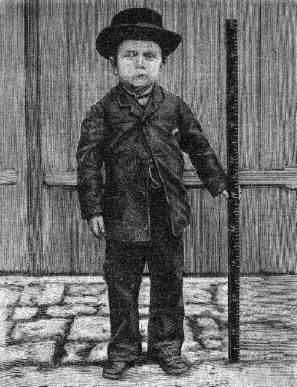
Auguste Boffy, "the smallest conscript of France." (1893 engraving).

Auguste-Ignace Tuaillon, called Boffy, (18 March 1873 – 12 November 1907) was a French dwarf chansonnier.

== Biography ==
Auguste Ignace Tuaillon was aged about five years when growth slowed or even stopped. His major muscular weakness preventing him from taking part in farm work, Auguste earned some money by performing from the age of fifteen as a freak in Luxeuil-les-Bains and Nancy. In 1893, on the occasion of his call for military recruitment, Augustus was reported by newspapers as "the smallest conscript of France." At twenty-three, his size was a little less than one meter (0.99 cm).

Shortly before 1896, Auguste arrived in Paris. First employed in a coffee shop close to the Gare de Lyon, he soon joined François Trombert's Cabaret des Quat'z'Arts where he met Guirand de Scevola, Jehan Rictus and Charles Léandre. In 1897, he became the manager of the weekly newspaper of the cabaret, Les 4 z'Arts, whose chief editor was Émile Goudeau. He was also a member of Eugénie Buffet's troupe and attained fame at the Théâtre des Noctambules. He was particularly successful in two productions, Le Nain de Tarascon by Clovis Hugues and Le Don Juan de Montmartre.

On 12 November 1907, after a fortnight of illness, Auguste Tuaillon died of tuberculosis at the age of 34 at the hôpital Lariboisière. His funeral took place on 14 November in the Saint-Vincent-de-Paul church in Paris. Grief was led by his friend the dwarf Delphin, like him from the Southern Vosges. The burial took place at Cimetière parisien de Pantin, where Xavier Privas, another friend of the deceased, said some words.

== Bibliography ==
- Léonce Manouvrier, « Sur le nain Auguste Tuaillon et sur le nanisme simple, avec ou sans microcéphalie », Bulletins de la Société d'anthropologie de Paris, vol. 7, 1896, (p. 264–290).
