= Camouflage tree =

WWI armored observation tower

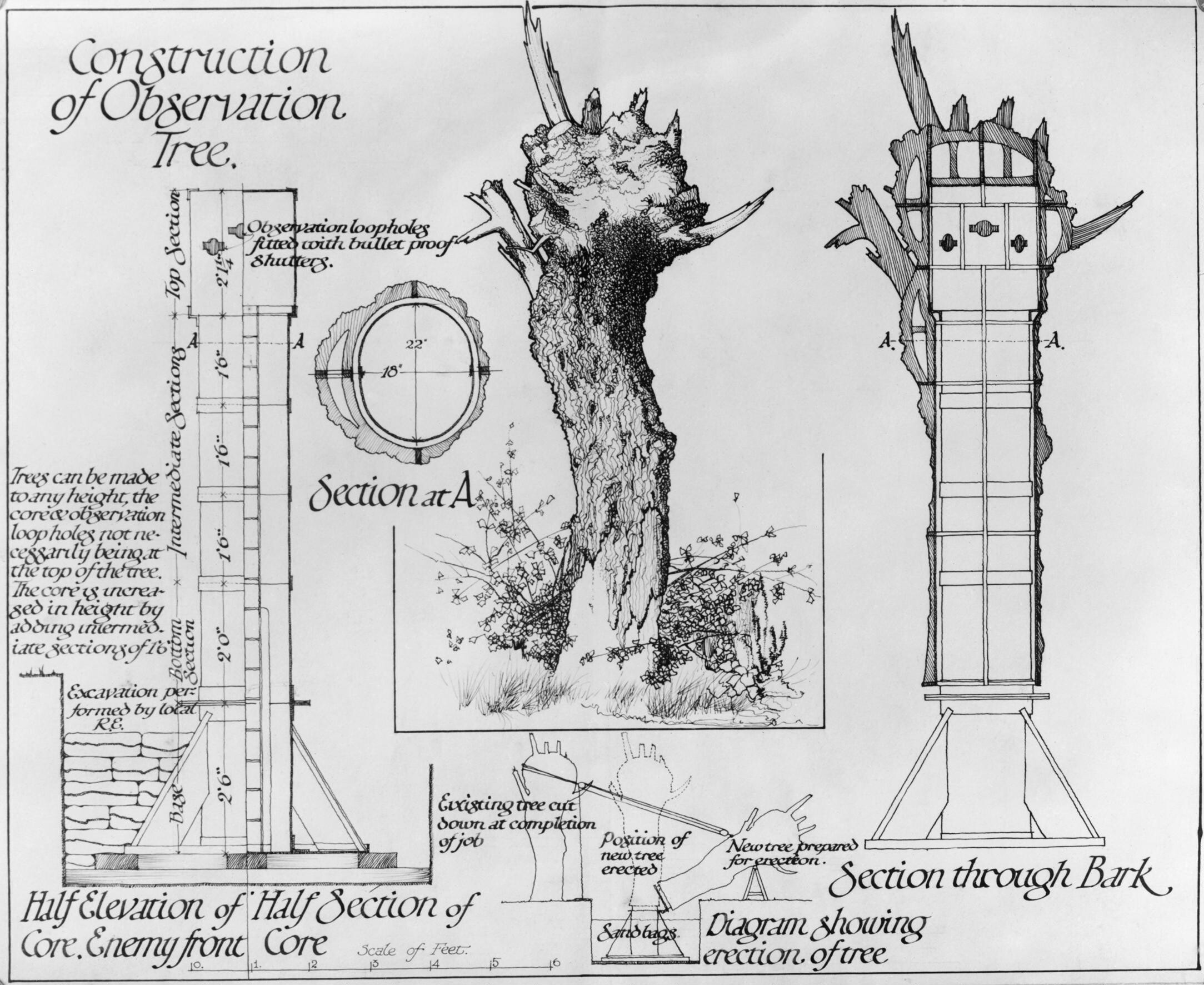
- Type: Military invention
- Inventor: Lucien-Victor Guirand de Scévola
- Inception: 1915
- Manufacturer: Various armed forces
- Available: No

Camouflage trees (also known as fake trees, false trees, and observation trees) were observation posts invented in 1915 by French painter Lucien-Victor Guirand de Scévola while leading the French army's Section de Camouflage.

They were used by the armed forces of France, the United Kingdom, and Germany in trench warfare during World War I.

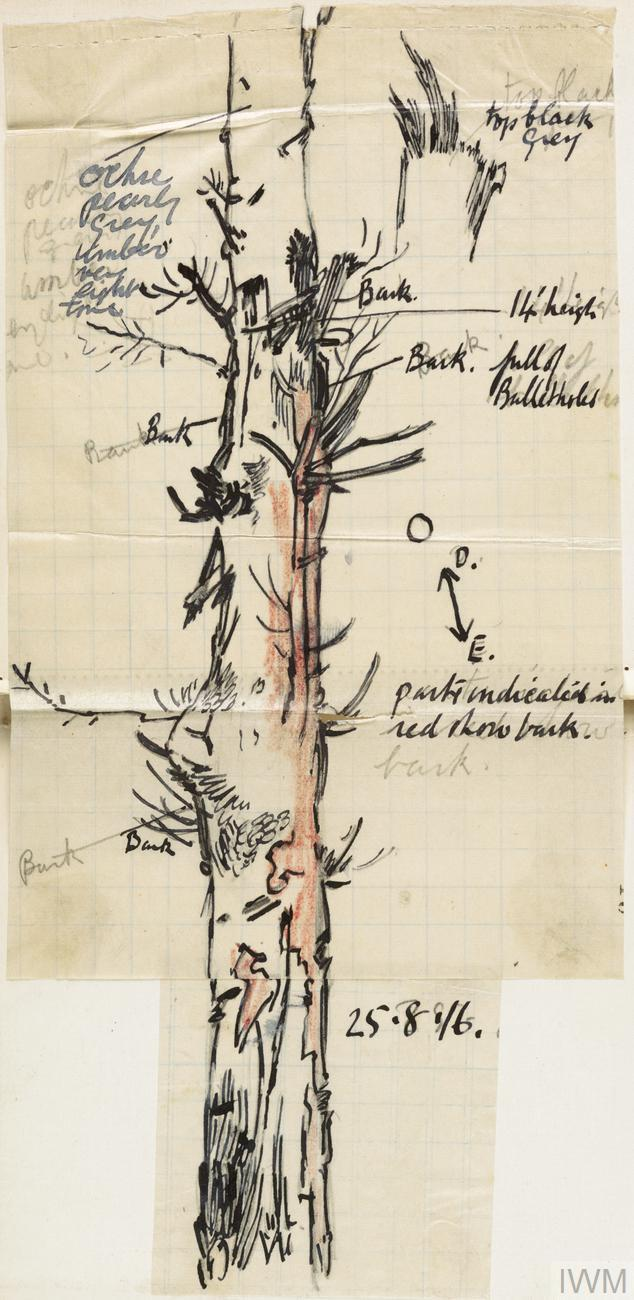
1916 sketch of a tree used to inform a camouflage tree construction.

== Nomenclature and background ==
English speakers also called camouflage trees "fake trees", "observation trees," and "false trees", while German speakers called the observers in the trees Baumbeobachter ('tree observers').

During World War I, both sides on the Western Front were engaged in trench warfare, making observations of enemy forces' activity difficult.

== Use ==
The camouflage tree was invented by the French painter Lucien-Victor Guirand de Scévola, leader of the French Army's Section de Camouflage, at the request of General de Castelnau. It was first used in May 1915 during the Second Battle of Artois.

The French Army subsequently shared the design with the British Army, who assigned Solomon Joseph Solomon to lead a program to make a British camouflage tree. Solomon directed artist and sculptor Leon Underwood of the Royal Engineers Camouflage Section to build the tree. Underwood selected a dead willow tree in no man's land between trenches, and sketched it. His sketches were used to build a replica that incorporated a steel-armoured observation tower and a periscope to protect the user. One night in March 1916, the original tree was cut down and replaced with the camouflaged tree.

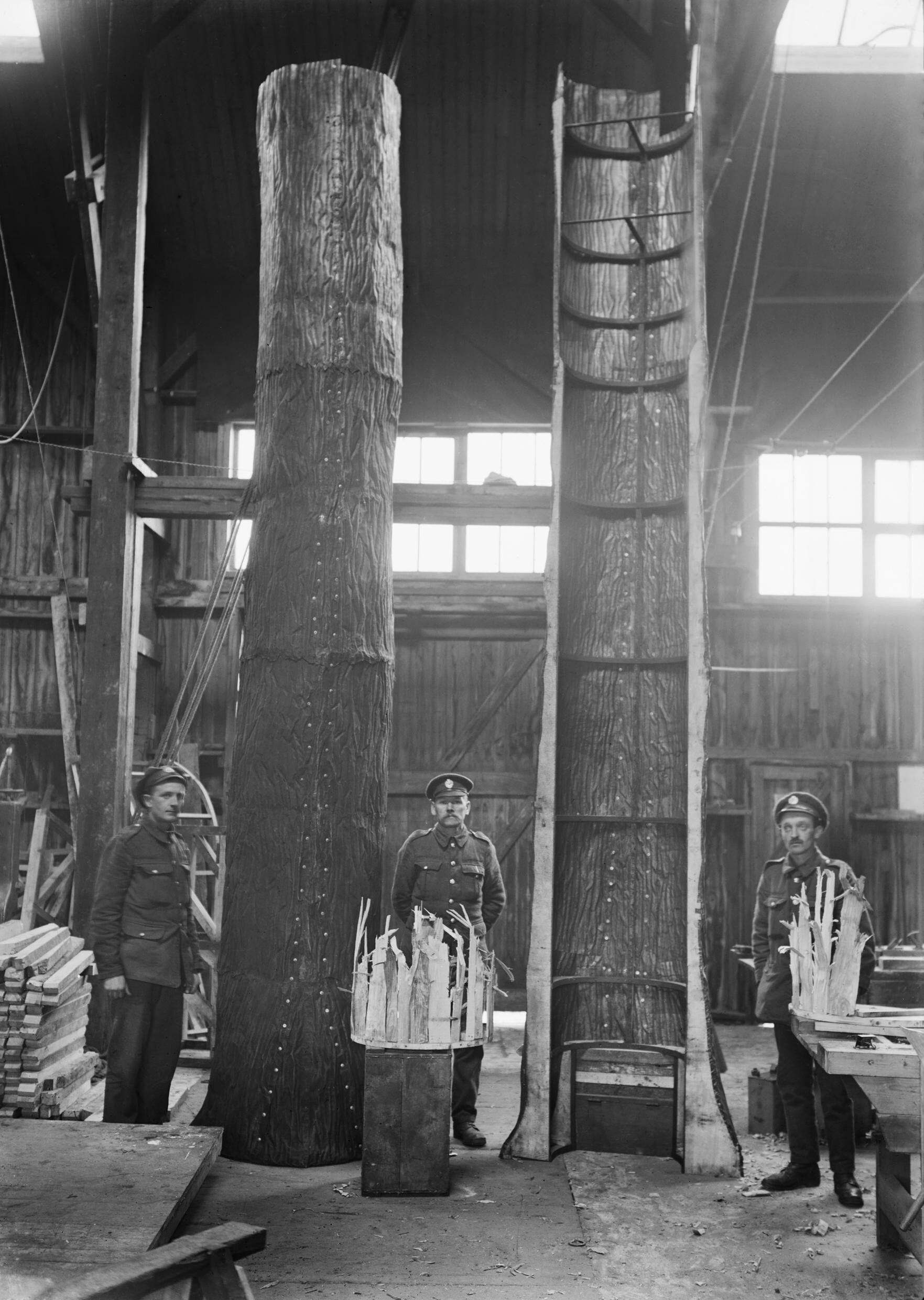
Photo of a camouflage tree

The German armed forces used a camouflage tree in 1917 in the Oosttaverne (or Oostaverne) Wood near Messines, Belgium during the Battle of Messines. The German design covered the viewing hole with wire mesh.

== Legacy ==
A British camouflage tree remains in the permanent collection of the Imperial War Museum's First World War Galleries.

The Australian War Memorial displayed a German camouflage tree during the centenary of World War I.

== See also ==
- Technology during World War I
- Military camouflage
- Fake building
