= Léon de Bercy =

French chansonnier

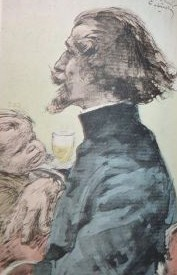
- Léon de Bercy by Charles Léandre, 1902.
- Born: 10 December 1857; Paris
- Died: 31 July 1915 (aged 57); Orléans
- Occupation: Chansonnier

Léon de Bercy, called Léon Drouin de Bercy or Léon Hiks (10 December 1857 in Paris – 31 July 1915 in Orléans, aged 57) was a French chansonnier.

A member of the literary club Les Hydropathes, he authored the reference book Montmartre et ses chansons : Poètes et Chansonniers (1902). He also collaborated with Aristide Bruant to L'Argot au XXe siècle. Dictionnaire français-argot.

== Songs or monologues ==
- Le Milliard congréganiste (1910), satirical ditty, lyrics by Léon de Bercy and V. Tarault, éd. Georges Ondet (cotage GO4396bis)
- Ne jurez pas aux femmes (c. 1895), ditty, lyrics by Briollet and Hiks, music by Tiska et Del, Répertoire libre. Recorded under the title Illusions fichues ou Ne jurez pas aux femmes, Odéon 238385 (undated)
- Series Les Refrains de la Butte (1904) under the pseudonym Léon Drouin de Bercy, éd. Plessis :
  - Une drôle de maison,
  - Le Brave Général Oku, fantaisie rosso-japonaise
  - La Cravate à Jean
  - Le Petit Frère à Ferdinand
  - La Vaseline

== Works ==
- Aristide Bruant (with collaboration of Léon Drouin de Bercy), L'Argot au XXe. Dictionnaire français-argot, Flammarion, Paris, 1901, 457 p.
- Léon de Bercy, Montmartre et ses chansons : Poètes et Chansonniers, with 5 portraits-charges by Charles Léandre, éd. H. Daragon, Paris, 1902 (available on Gallica)

== Sources ==
- Dix ans de bohème on wikisource
- Émile Goudeau, Dix ans de bohème, Henry du Parc, Paris, 1888 – Reprint under the direction of Michel Golfier and Jean-Didier Wagneur (with coll. of Patrick Ramseyer), Champvallon, 2000, 573 p.
