= Cabaret des Quat'z'Arts =

Venue in Paris, France

Coordinates: 48.8834°N 2.3346°E

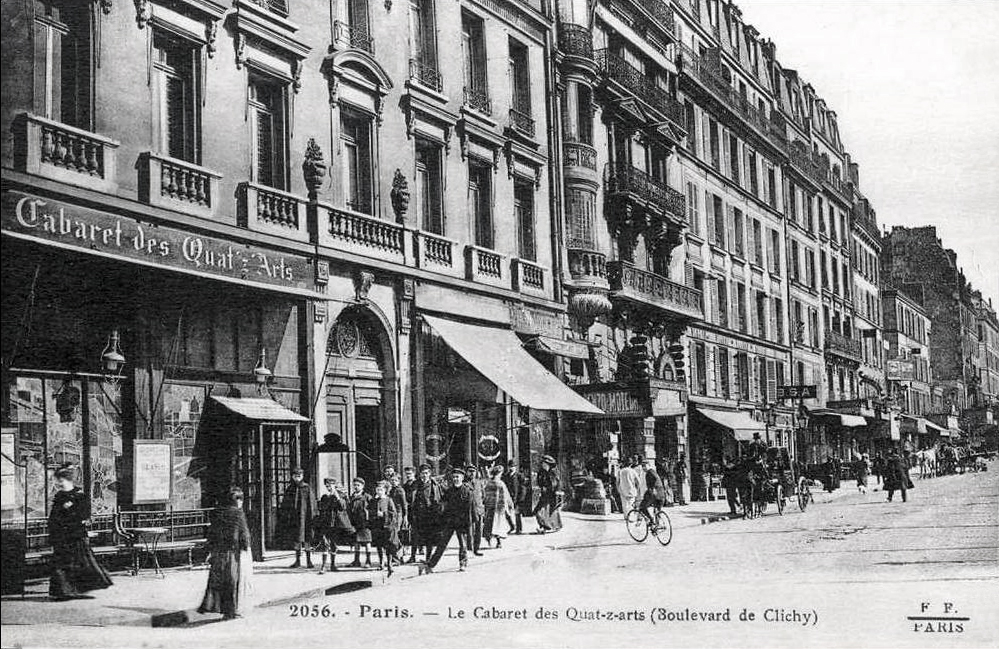
Cabaret des Quat'z'Arts

Cabaret des Quat'z'Arts ("cabaret of the four arts") was a venue at 62 Boulevard de Clichy, in Paris, France. The interdisciplinary mixture of the arts created avant-garde collaborative performances. Similar to Le Chat Noir, the Quat'z'Arts was a gathering place for artists, composers, musicians, performers, poets, illustrators, and theater critics, attracting newcomers such as Pablo Picasso and Apollinaire. It provided space for permanent and temporary art exhibits by the likes of Emile Cohl, Jules-Alexandre Grün, Charles Léandre, Georges Redon, Lucien-Victor Guirand de Scévola, Henri de Toulouse-Lautrec, Louis Abel-Truchet, and Adolphe Willette.

== History ==
The Cabaret des Quat'z'Arts was founded in December 1893 by François Trombert on the site of the old Café du Tambourin. He named the establishment after the second annual Bal des Quat'z'Arts, an event of the École des Beaux-Arts. That costume ball was held 9 February 1893 at the Moulin Rouge and, along with merriment and drinking, included nude models as living paintings, a nude woman standing on a table at midnight, and a subsequent lawsuit. The term "Quat'z'Arts" referred to the school's four disciplines (architecture, painting, printmaking, and sculpture). Theatrical offerings were performed by the cabaret's troupe or by marionettes and included satirical revues and shadow plays. Venues similar to Chat Noir were La Lune Rousse and Les Pantins. After Trombert's death (1908), Martial Boyer took over as director; subsequent editors were Gabriel Montoya and Vincent Hyspa.

Les Quat'z'arts, the cabaret's official magazine, was established in November 1897 and included anecdotes, chronicles, jokes, parodies, and satirical commentary. In 1897, the chansonnier Auguste Tuaillon was appointed chief editor of the magazine. Starting as an eight-page weekly which was sold at the venue, by February 1898, it was reduced to four pages, and three months later, it suspended publication. Thirteen additional issues were printed between 1900 and 1908. Four muses on the masthead depicted architecture, painting, sculpture, and engraving, while swimming across the Seine with lions (symbolizing young artists) following behind them, all to join poetry in Montmartre.

== Architecture and fittings ==
The venue had three rooms. The "locale" featured eclectic interior design by Henri Pille and was decorated in a pseudo-gothic, pseudo-Renaissance style. The "salle de café" had paneled, bronze and statuette embellishments. Between 1894 and 1905, a group of artists and poets in the cabaret produced Le Mur ("The Wall"), consisting of a display on one of the walls that was changed weekly. Considered a journal by those who created it, the mounted drawings, poems, newspaper clippings, commentary on current events, literature, and art, were meant to be seen rather than to be read (le voir et non le lire; "to see it not to read it").
