= Lucien-Victor Guirand de Scévola =

French painter (1871–1950)

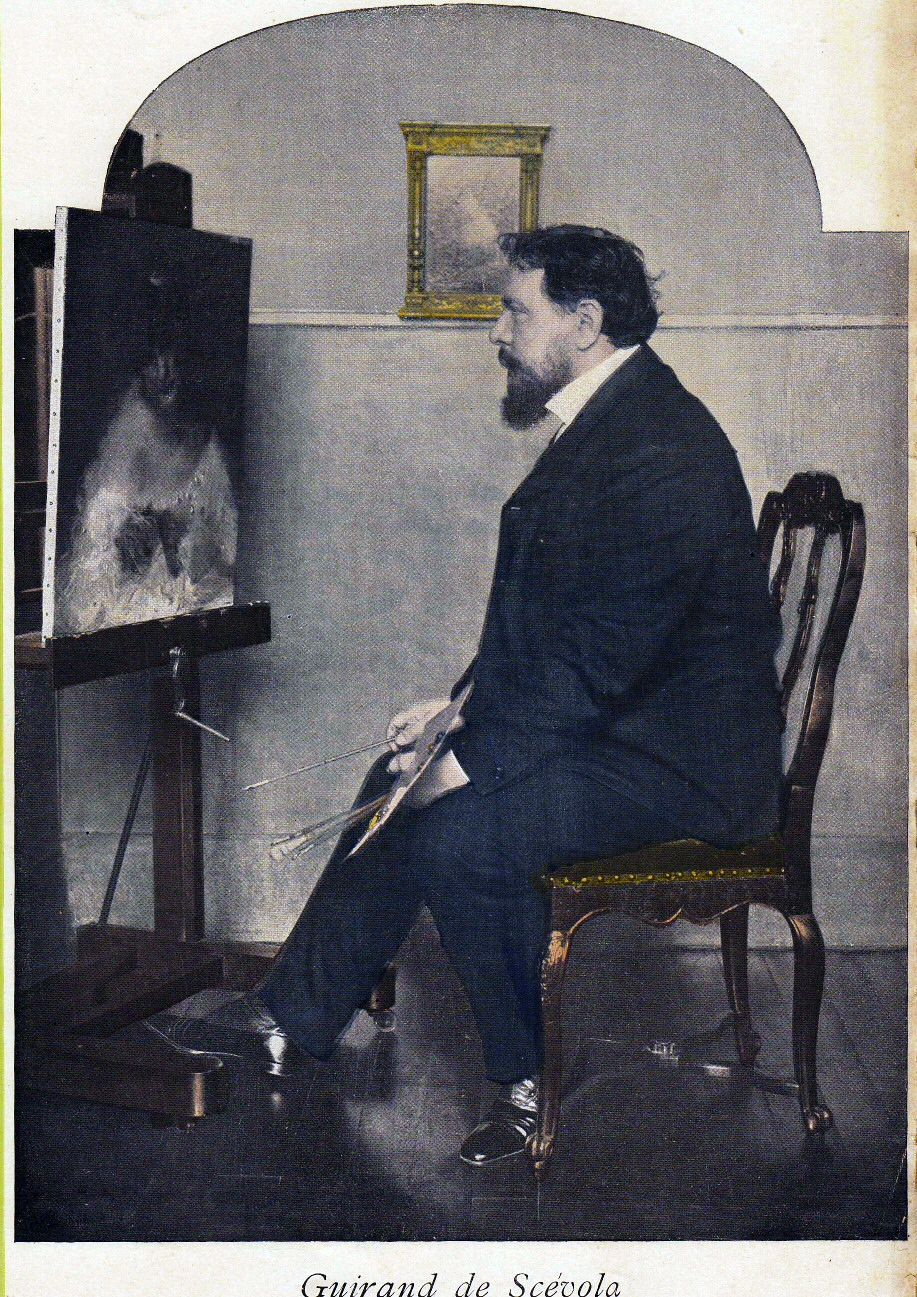
- Guirand de Scévola
- Born: 14 November 1871; Sète, France
- Died: 29 March 1950 (aged 78); Paris, France
- Education: École des beaux-arts de Paris
- Known for: Pastel painting
- Movement: Symbolism
- Elected: Légion d'honneur

Lucien-Victor Guirand de Scévola (14 November 1871 in Sète, France – 29 March 1950 in Paris) was a French painter. He is known for his pioneering leadership of the Camoufleurs (the French Camouflage Department) in World War I.

== Early life ==
De Scévola was a student of Fernand Cormon and Pierre Dupuis at the École des beaux-arts de Paris.

== Pastellist ==
De Scévola was a pastellist, remarkable for his silky, velvety and smooth style.

"Making his only aesthetic concern accuracy of the most naked kind" (E. Benézit), he left an extensive body of work including scenes of alcoves, landscapes, flowers and society portraits. However his Symbolist-inspired works are particularly esteemed. He exhibited at the Salon des artistes français.

De Scévola was a member of the Société des Pastellistes Français and the Comité de la Société des Beaux-Arts de Paris. He was made an Officer of the Légion d'honneur in 1914, by which time he was known as an elegant society portrait artist.

== Military camouflage ==
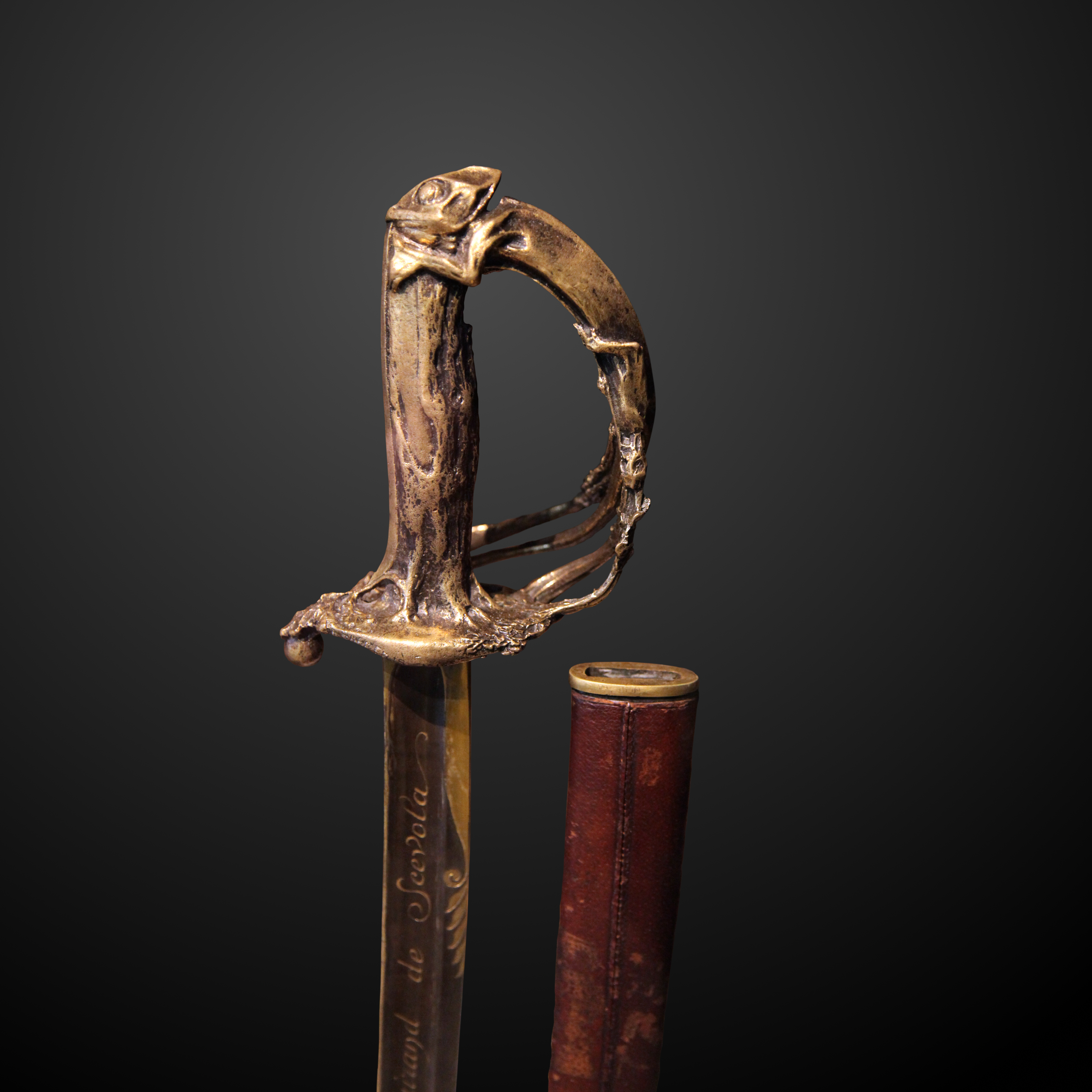
Sabre presented by the French army's "Section de Camouflage" to its head camoufleur, de Scévola

De Scévola is considered one of the inventors of military camouflage during World War I, together with Eugène Corbin and the painter Louis Guingot.

In order to deform totally the aspect of an object, I had to employ the means that cubists use to represent it.

— Lucien-Victor Guirand de Scévola

At the start of the war, in September 1914, De Scévola, serving as a second-class gunner, experimentally camouflaged a gun emplacement with a painted canvas screen. On 12 February 1915 General Joffre established the "Section de Camouflage" (English: Camouflage Department) at Amiens. By May 1915 the Section de Camouflage put up its first observation tree, an iron lookout post camouflaged with bark and other materials during the Battle of Artois. By the end of 1915, De Scévola became commander of the French Camouflage Corps, employing cubist artists such as André Mare, a specialist in camouflaging lookout posts. By 1917, De Scévola's team had grown to 3000, taking in artists including Jacques Villon, André Dunoyer de Segonzac, Charles Camoin, Louis Abel-Truchet and Charles Dufresne.

== Works ==
"SSNBA" indicates the work was exhibited at the Salon de la Société Nationale des Beaux-Arts.

- Road to Provence (exhibited at National Museum of Serbia)
- Le Château de Versailles (SSNBA 1920)
- Portrait du Marquis de Massa (SSNBA 1908)
- Portrait de Mlle W. (SSNBA 1909)
- Cour d'honneur (SSNBA 1909)
- Portrait de Mlle Tiane (SSNBA 1911)
- Portrait de M. Pierre Lafitte (SSNBA 1912)
- Aida Boni, de l'Opéra (SSNBA 1913)
- Portrait de Mme V. G. (SSNBA 1910)
- Mme Fournials
- M. Severin sur son lit de mort
- Portrait du général Fayolle

== Publications ==
- Guirand de Scévola, Lucien-Victor (December 1949). "Souvenir de Camouflage (1914-1918)". Revue des Deux Mondes (in French). Archived from the original on 2013-06-17.

== Paintings ==
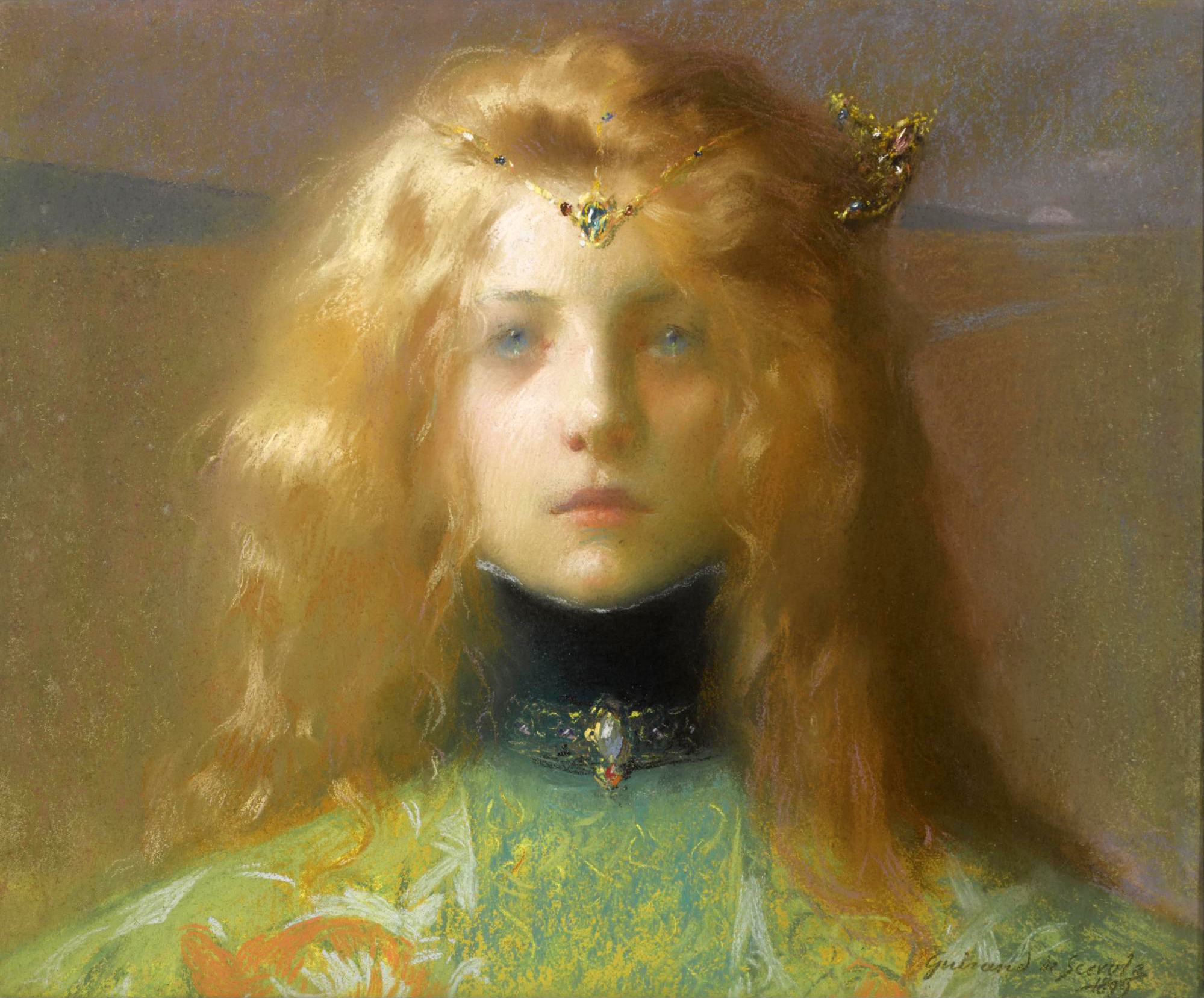
Jeune fille de face, 1899 painting

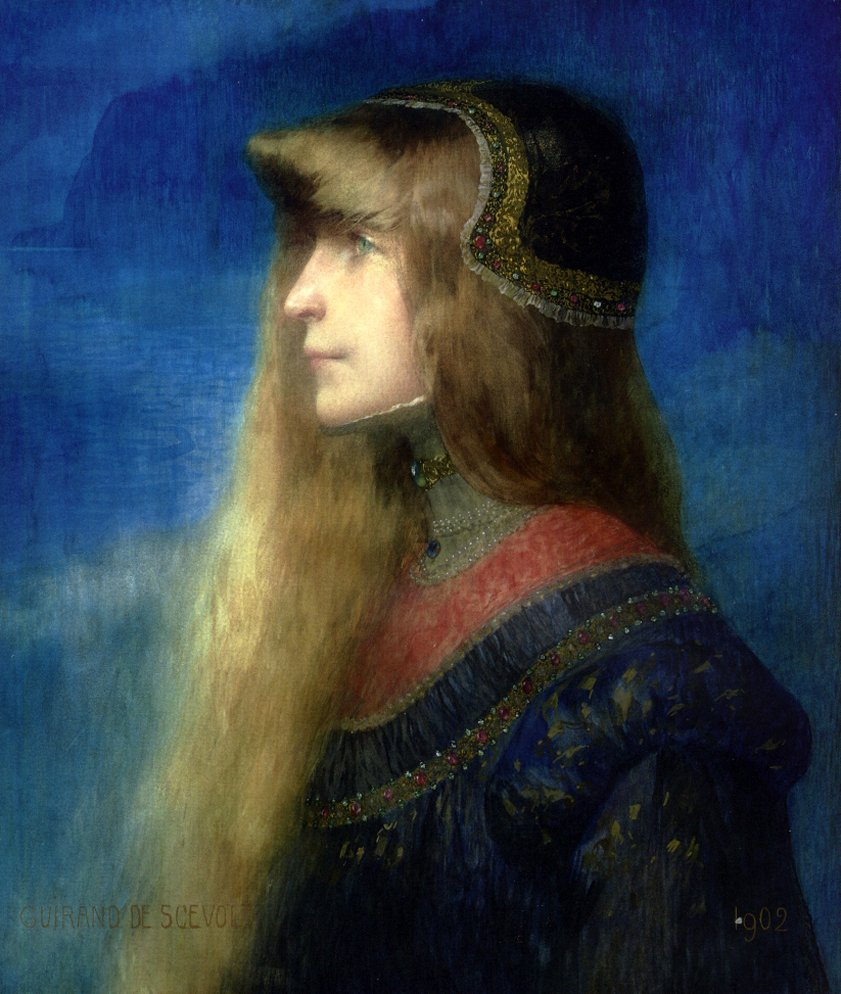
The King's Daughter

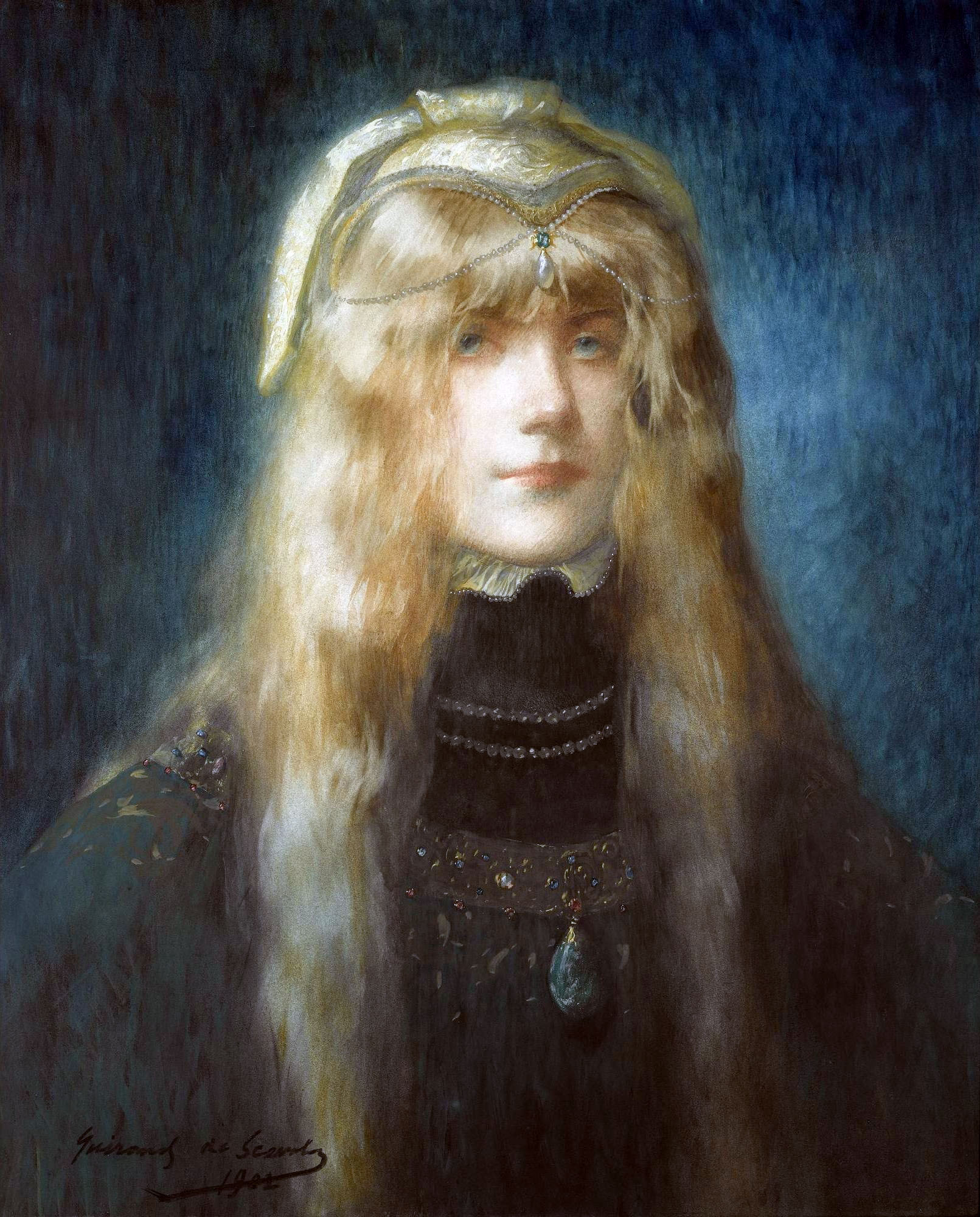
The Princess

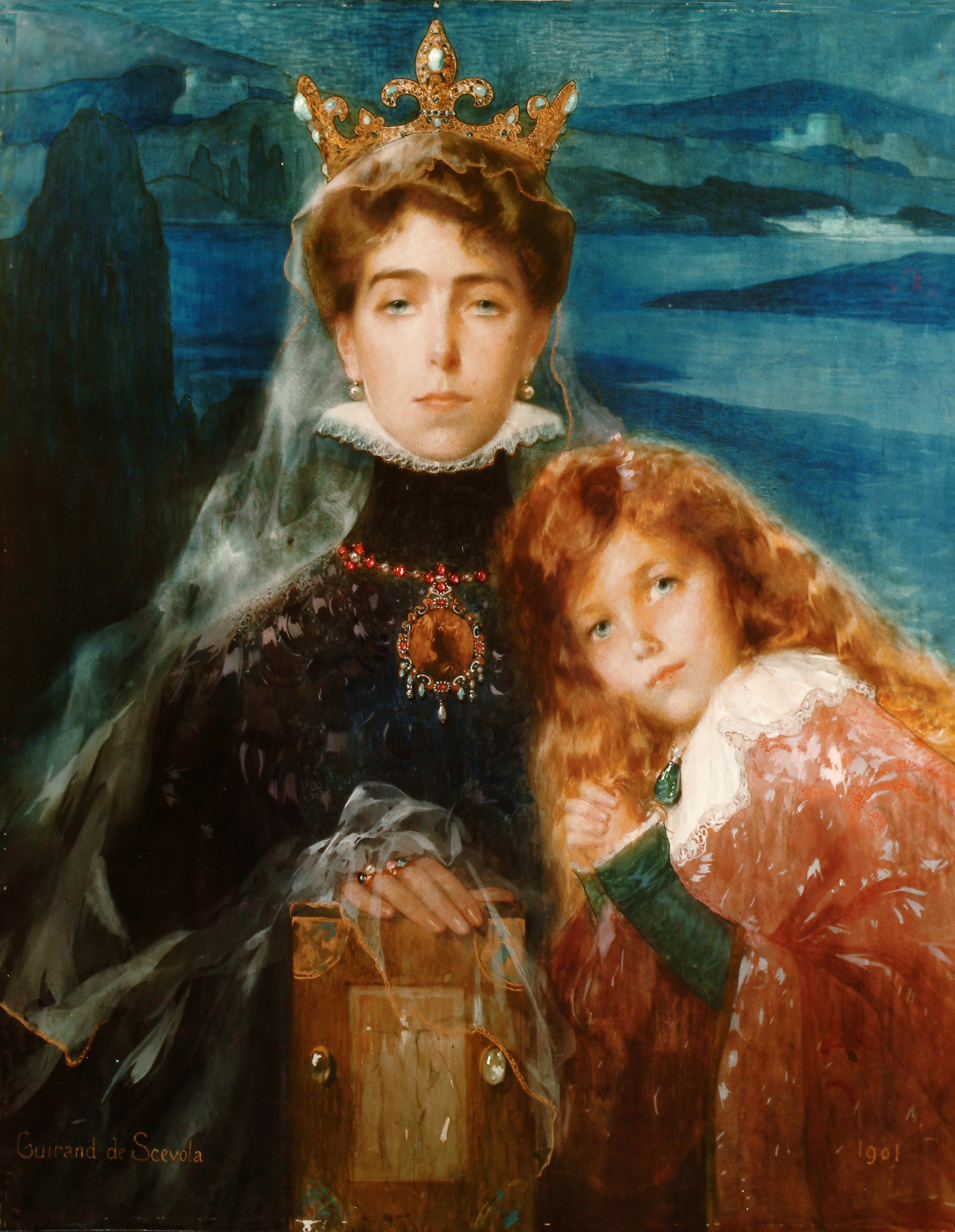
Victoria Melita of Saxe-Coburg and Gotha and her daughter

== Sources ==
- Forbes, Peter (2009). Dazzled and Deceived: Mimicry and Camouflage. New Haven: Yale University Press. ISBN 978-0300125399.
