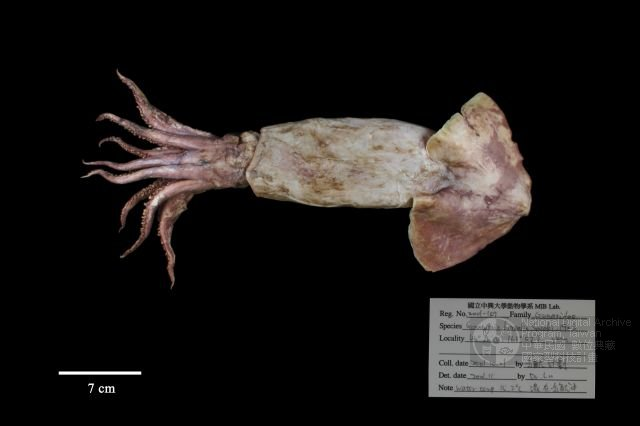
- Gonatopsis borealis museum specimen from National Chung Hsing University, Department of Life Science

Conservation status
- Least Concern (IUCN 3.1)

Scientific classification
- Kingdom: Animalia
- Phylum: Mollusca
- Class: Cephalopoda
- Order: Oegopsida
- Family: Gonatidae
- Genus: Gonatopsis
- Species: G. borealis

Binomial name
- Gonatopsis borealis Sasaki, 1923

= Gonatopsis borealis =

Species of squid

Gonatopsis borealis, the Boreopacific armhook squid, is a species of squid from the North Pacific Ocean. It is a member of the family Gonatidae. It is an abundant species which is currently caught mainly as a bycatch by fishing boats targeting other quarry. It is an important prey species for many commercially important species of fish, as well as for marine mammals.

== Description ==
Gonatopsis borealis is a medium-sized squid. There are three morphs: large bodied, slender bodied and small bodied; these may be separate taxa, but this needs more research. The main characteristics which distinguish this species from closely related species are that it has transverse rows of seven teeth on its radula, rather short blunt-tipped arms which have four rows of suckers near their tips, and a muscular mantle. The muscular arms are 40-45% of the mantle length and some are longer than others, arms III have well-developed aboral keels. Arms I to III have 2 middle series of hooks and 2 marginal series of suckers; arm IV has no hooks and four series of suckers. The development of hooks on the arms does not occur until the animal reaches a mantle length of 35 to 45 mm. There is no hectocotylus. The lose their tentacles at the paralarva stage. They have large eyes and a nuchal crest which has four longitudinal nuchal folds of skin on either side of it. The muscular mantle is cylindrical and tapers to a blunt posterior. The muscular fins are short (40 to 45% of the mantle length), wide (65 to 80% of mantle length) and rhomboid in shape. There is no tail. The skin on the mantle is dark reddish or purplish brown in colour and there are no photophores. Mature males grow to a mantle length of 270mm ML while mature females reach mantle lengths of 330mm.

The paralarvae are distinguished by the pattern of chromatophores on the dorsal part of the head. This consists of three transverse rows of chromatophores with a single chromatophore in the front row, two in the middle row and three in the rear row. They also have 6-10 chromatophores in the dorsal surface of the mantle.

== Distribution ==
Gonatopsis borealis is found in the North Pacific Ocean, where its range extends from northern Japan at a latitude of roughly 37°N to 40°N through the Okhotsk Sea, Bering Sea all along the Aleutian Islands into the Gulf of Alaska, south along the western coast of North America to California, even reaching Baja California at a latitude of 20°N. The type specimen was taken off Hokkaido, some 15–30 miles (24–48 km) east of Kushiro.

== Habitat and biology ==
Gonatopsis borealis is an oceanic speciesand it is one of the most widely distributed and abundant species of the family Gonatidae. It can be found in cold temperate waters, where it can occur from the surface to the mesopelagic zone, even reaching into the bathypelagic zone. It undertakes a diel vertical migration, moving up the water column at night, and for forming very large aggregations between the Spring and the early autumn, especially in both the eastern and western parts of its range. The abundance of G. borealis is indicated by it accounting for up to 68% of squid catches in the Okhotsk Sea during the summer months. G. borealis is found in epipelagic, mesopelagic and bathypelagic depths from the surface to 1500m. It has a benthic habit at 200 to 1 375m, but it is most numerous in the midwater realm, with maximum abundance occurring at 300 to 500m, while only a few single specimens are caught below 1000 m (probably having been caught at much shallower depths while the open nets were retrieved through their zone of most abundance). Off California there were no specimens of any age recorded during the day at depth of less than 300m, and 90% of specimens collected during daylight were from 400 to 700m. By contrast, specimens occurred mainly at 100 to 500m, principally 300 to 400m at night. Smaller animals undertook the diel migration to the surface layers earlier than the larger ones. They also returned to depths sooner, possibly a behavioural adaptation to avoid the larger cannibalistic adults. This species preys on a diverse variety of pelagic crustaceans such as euphausiids, hyperiid amphipods and copepods, as well as fishes and other squid. They live for at least a year. Their predators include fish such as salmonids, walleye Pollock, pomfret, albacore and grenadiers, as well as the larger squid Berryteuthis magister and cannibalistic G. borealis. Other predators include seabirds, seals, sea lions, dolphins and toothed whales, such as sperm whale and pilot whales.

== Fisheries ==
Gonatopsis borealis is an abundant species. In the Sea of Ohotsk in the summer months there is estimated to be a biomass of this species ranging from 278,000 tonnes to 500,000 tonnes, with estimates of 209,000 tonnes in the western Bering Sea, 285,000 tonnes off the western Kamchatka coast, and 100,000 tonnes in waters around the Kuril Islands. The large morph of this species form the major part of any catch. It is caught as bycatch with jigs, and substantial numbers are caught in drift gillnets which are set to take salmonids and the neon flying squid (Ommastrephes bartramii). The meat of this species is said to be highly palatable, and as it is an abundant species it is thought to have a high potential to support fisheries. However, it is the principal prey for many of valuable species of fish, and this ecological role is perhaps more important to local fisheries than any development of a fishery to target this species.

== Taxonomy ==
Gonatopsis borealis differs from other members of the genus Gonatopsis in having seven rather than five rows of teeth on the radula. Kir Nesis proposed that it be placed in its own subgenus Boreoteuthis. Subsequently, this has been treated by some authorities as a separate genus. The generic status of G. borealis is yet to resolved, as is the taxonomic status of the three size morphs which have been recorded.

In the Asiatic part of its range, two distinct populations are found, a more northerly population which matures at less than 180mm mantle length, and a more southern population found south of latitude 45°N to 47°N, which reached sexual maturity at larger than 220mm mantle length. The two populations are found sympatrically in the waters off the Kuril Islands.
