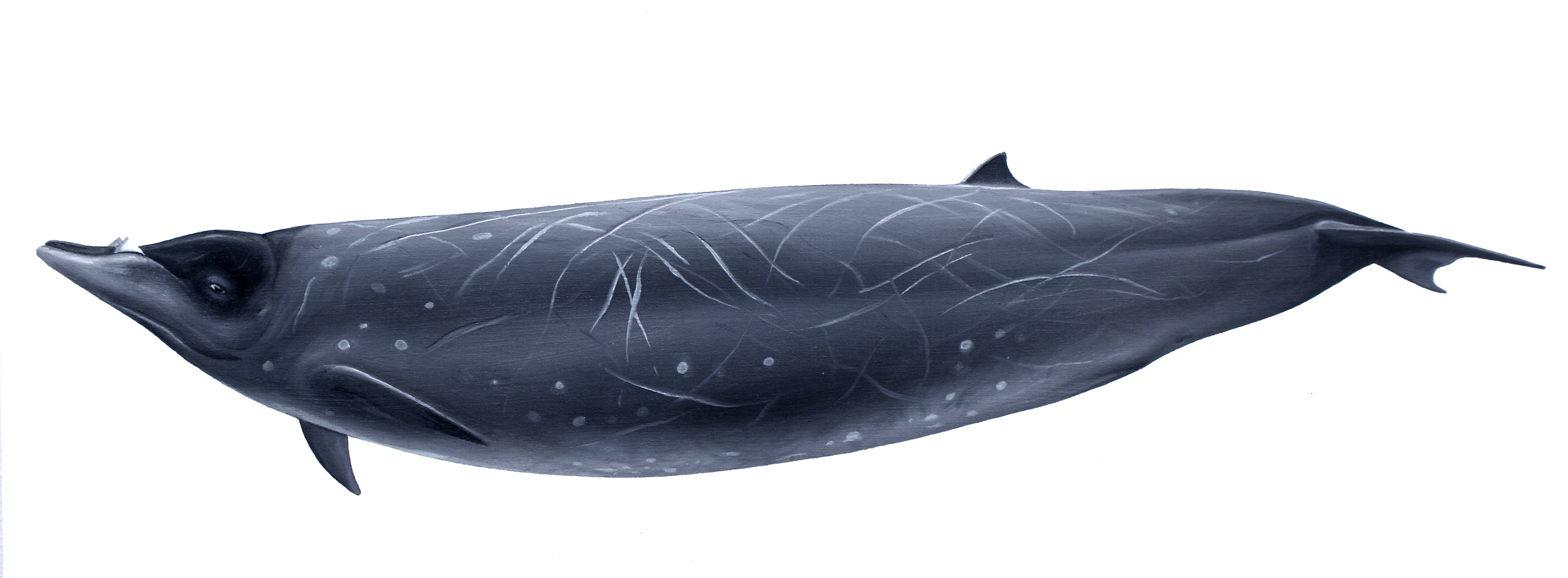

- Size compared to an average human

Conservation status
- Near Threatened (IUCN 3.1)
- CITES Appendix II

Scientific classification
- Kingdom: Animalia
- Phylum: Chordata
- Class: Mammalia
- Infraclass: Placentalia
- Order: Artiodactyla
- Infraorder: Cetacea
- Family: Ziphiidae
- Genus: Mesoplodon
- Species: M. stejnegeri

Binomial name
- Mesoplodon stejnegeri True, 1885
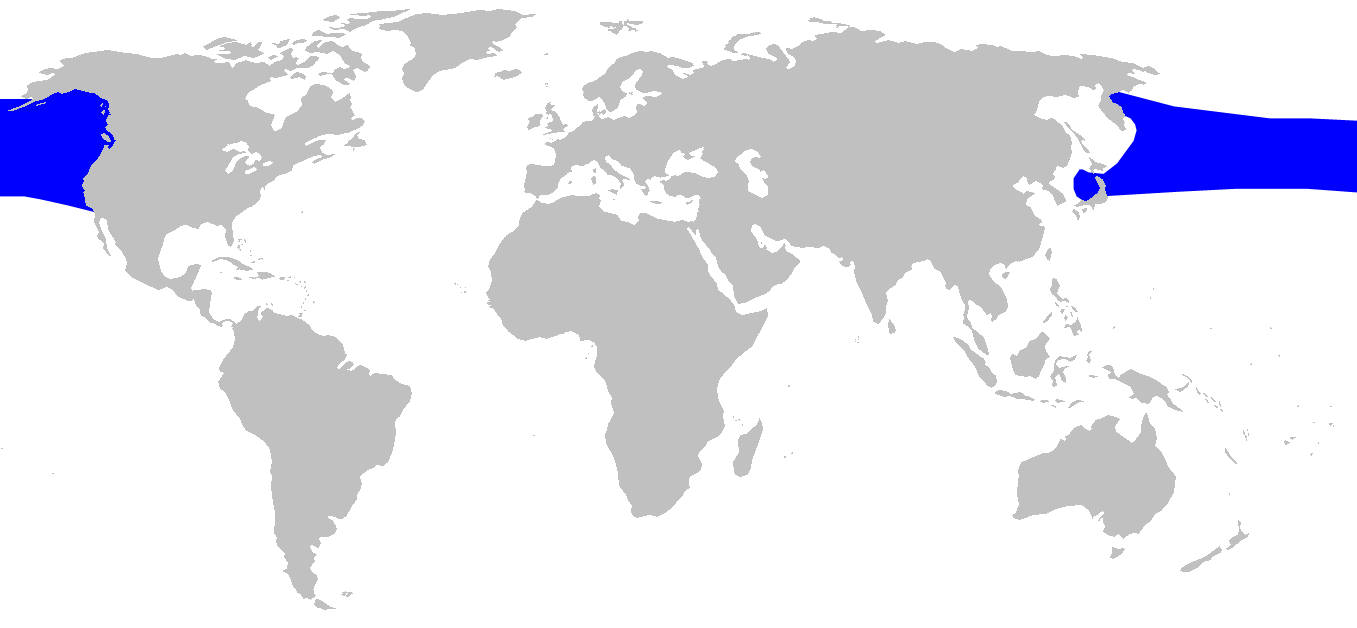
- Stejneger's beaked whale range

= Stejneger's beaked whale =

Species of mammal

Stejneger's beaked whale (Mesoplodon stejnegeri), also known as the Bering Sea beaked whale or the saber-toothed whale, is a relatively unknown member of the genus Mesoplodon inhabiting the North Pacific Ocean. Leonhard Hess Stejneger collected the type specimen (a beach-worn skull) on Bering Island in 1883, from which Frederick W. True provided the species' description in 1885. In 1904, the first complete skull (from an adult male that had stranded near Newport, Oregon) was collected, which confirmed the species' validity. Limited data exists regarding the global population of Stejneger's beaked whales, primarily due to the infrequency of sightings at sea. In general, beaked whales are elusive and wary, and the species within this family do not have prominent physical traits in comparison to other beaked whales. This makes it challenging to identify them individually.

== Description ==
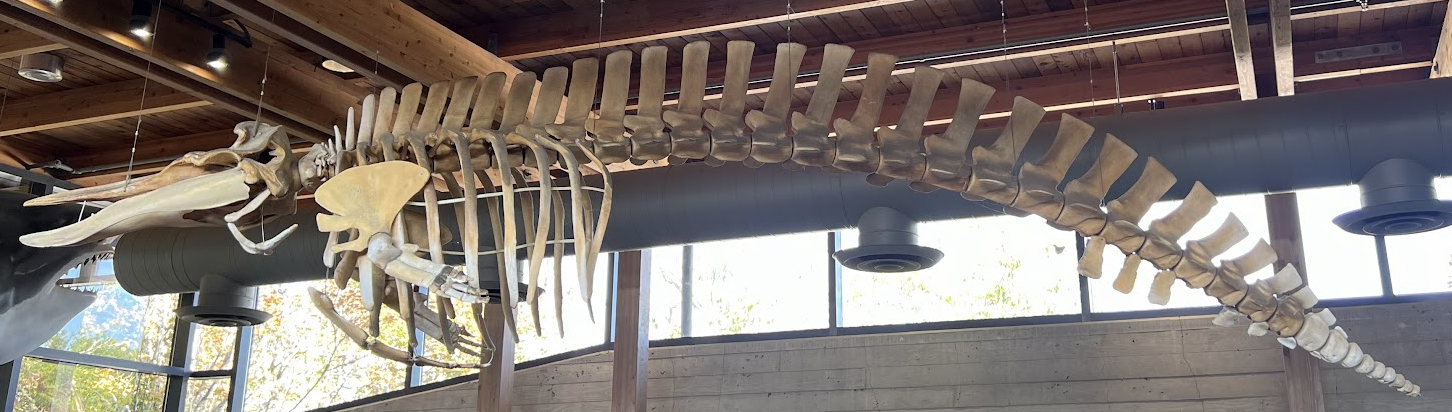
Skeleton at the Oregon Coast Aquarium

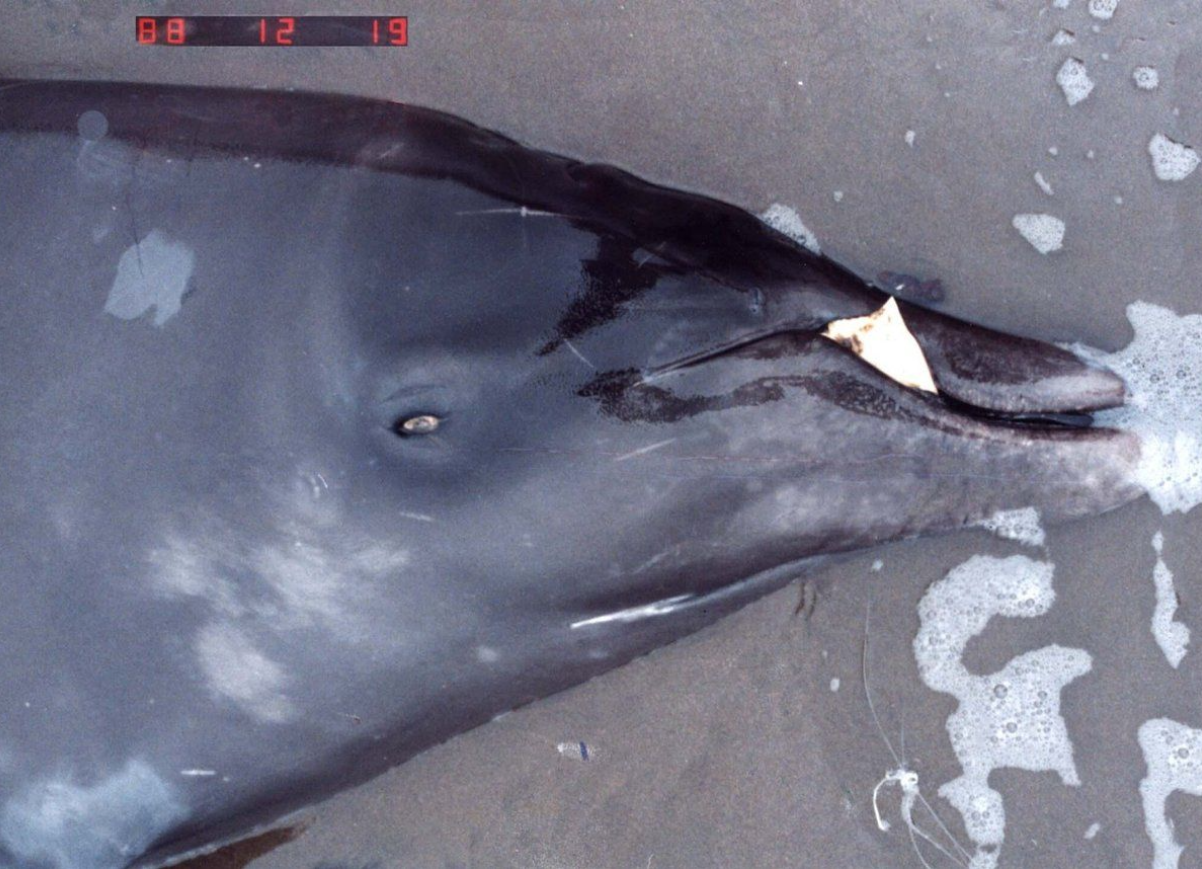
Head of an adult male, showing the characteristic dark cap and large teeth.

The body of this species is typical for the genus Mesoplodon, long and tapering at both ends. The snout is of medium length, and the mouthline forms an arch, though much smoother than in other species. This species is distinguishable from other Mesoplodon via tooth shape, which got them the name of saber-toothed whale, and position. The teeth of the males are much larger than those of most other Mesoplodon species, and point forwards and inwards right in front of the apex. Only strap-toothed whales and spade-toothed whales have longer teeth.

Their coloration ranges from grey to black with a light ventral side, though males are usually darker. The coloration darkens with age, but females also have a light pattern on the bottom of the flukes that becomes more apparent with age. Their length is at least 5.25 m (17 ft) for males and 5.5 m (18 ft) for females, and they can weigh up to 3,527 pounds. They are likely around 2.1 to 2.3 m (6.9 to 7.5 ft) in length when born.

== Population and habitat ==
This is the northernmost species of beaked whale in the Pacific Ocean, ranging up into the Bering Sea. They are distributed along both sides of the Pacific to Miyagi Prefecture, Japan, Oregon, British Columbia, and southern California. They may migrate south in winter. These animals are rarely spotted, and they inhabit the deep water far away from the shoreline. They usually inhabit depth between 2,500-5,000 feet. They also typically prefer cooler waters.

== Behavior and ecology ==
=== Social behavior ===
These whales are diurnal and migratory, typically found in pods of two to six, but some research shows they have been found in pods from as low as five to as many as fifteen. The groups may have age and sex segregation. They are very social animals and swim side by side, often making contact, surfacing and diving together. They can swim at speeds of 5,5 to 7,5 km/h, with top speeds reaching roughly 11 km/h. Additionally, while in pods, members often take 2 to 3 synchronized low blows, followed by vocalizations described as "roars, lowing, and sobbing groans." These vocalizations can be used for reproduction, danger alarms, or general communication between whales. All of their communication is tactile and chemical based and they have an average lifespan of 35 years old. Scarring also frequently occurs due to fighting amongst individuals over mates, with the wounds caused by the teeth while the mouth remains closed.

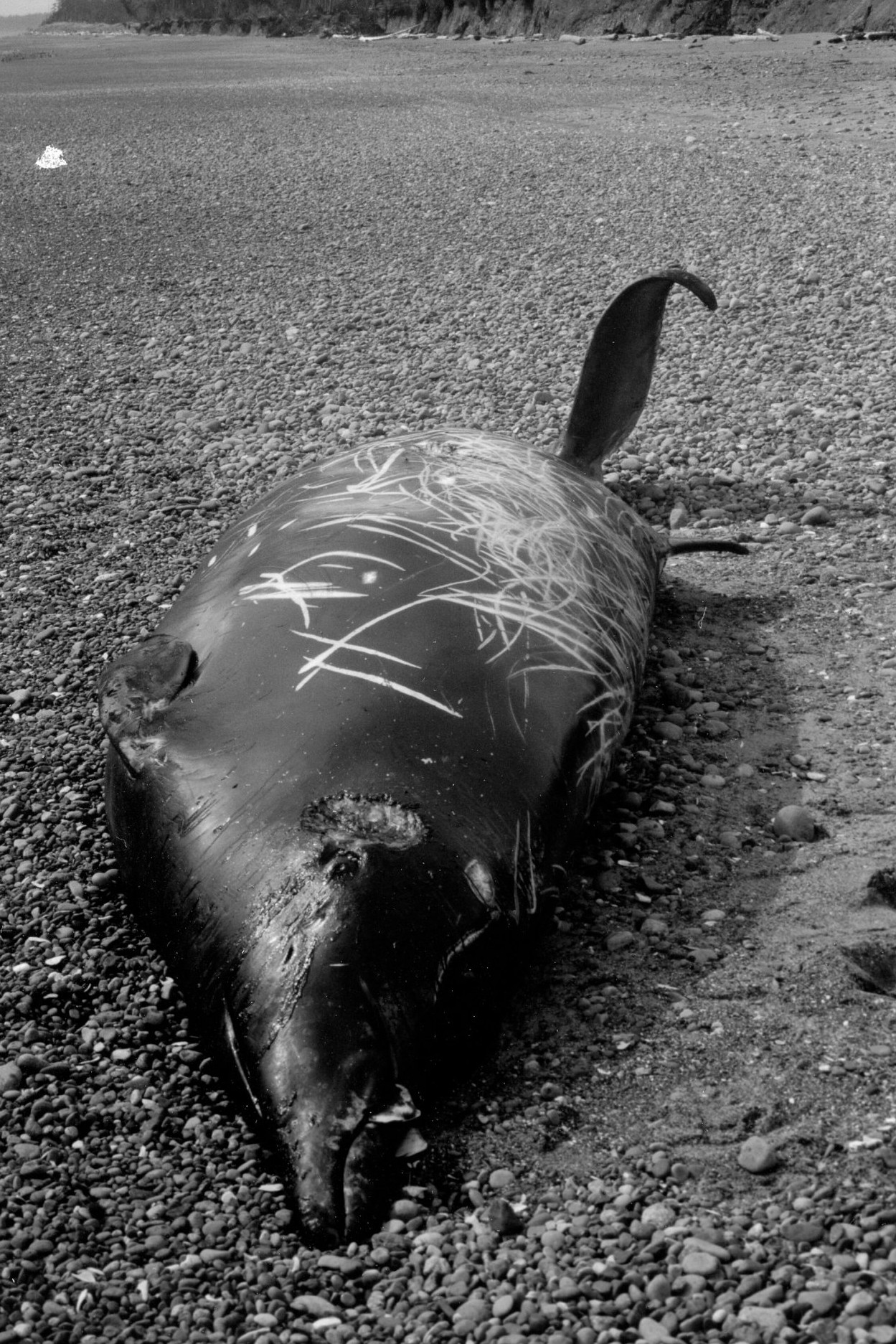
A heavily-scarred adult male.

=== Diet ===
This whale seemingly feeds primarily on deepwater cephalopods such as fiery armhook squid, Taonius borealis, commander squid, and Gonatopsis okutanii, and fish. In one instance, a school of salmon was seen being pursued by M. stejnegeri off the coast of Japan. It presumably locates prey via echolocation and suction-feeds like other Mesoplodon species, creating a negative pressure cavity in its mouth by retracting its tongue and expanding the throat grooves, powerfully drawing prey inside like a biological vacuum. A typical behavior involves a series of shallow dives followed by a longer dive lasting about 10 to 15 minutes, reaching depths of up to 4,920 feet.

=== Reproduction ===
Nothing is known about the reproduction of this species. It is speculated that they have an average number of one offspring and births happen in the spring and summer. They may become sexually mature when they reach 14.8 feet, but sexually mature females can give birth to a 175 pound calf at about 8 feet long. During mating, adult males fight each other extensively, and some specimens have been found with healed jaw fractures.

== Conservation ==
This species has been occasionally hunted in Japan in the past, and caught in salmon drift nets. The flesh of this whale is deemed enjoyable when cooked, though the Makah Indians in Washington have noted instances of diarrhea after consuming its blubber and meat. A limited number of these whales are caught by commercial fisheries, mainly in Japan. There have been instances where Stejneger's beaked whales have consumed hazardous materials, including plastic bags and strings, so they are at risk for marine debris.

Additionally, as deep-diving cetaceans, these whales rely on sound for feeding, communication, and navigation. Noise pollution from human activities, such as active sonar or seismic surveys, can disrupt their natural behaviors and forced them to abandon critical habitats. Loud anthropogenic sounds may also cause these whales to surface too quickly, resulting in decompression sickness or even death. They are of a conservation concern and are listed on the IUCN Red List as near threatened. In the United States, all Stejneger's beaked whales are protected under the Marine Mammal Protection Act. Efforts to conserve this species include reducing encounters with fishing gear and mitigating the impacts of vessel disturbances, noise pollution, and other human-related threats.

== See also ==
- List of cetaceans
