= Antarctic neosquid =

Conservation status
- Least Concern (IUCN 3.1)

Scientific classification
- Kingdom: Animalia
- Phylum: Mollusca
- Class: Cephalopoda
- Order: Oegopsida
- Family: Neoteuthidae
- Genus: Alluroteuthis; Odhner, 1923
- Species: A. antarcticus

Binomial name
- Alluroteuthis antarcticus Odhner, 1923

Species of squid

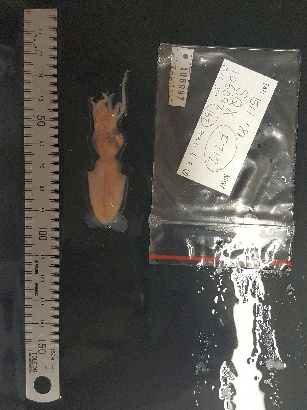

The Antarctic neosquid (Alluroteuthis antarcticus) is the only neosquid in the genus Alluroteuthis. The tentacles are relatively short compared to the arms.

Nils Hjalmar Odhner, discoverer of the species, suggested that Parateuthis tunicata, discovered by Johannes Thiele in 1920, might be a young Antarctic neosquid. The validity of this suggestion is still in question. The name is derived from its habitat in the Antarctic Ocean.

== Distribution ==
Alluroteuthis antarcticus occurs in from depths of 0–2,800 m (epipelagic and mesopelagic waters), and paralarvae can be found in the upper 200 m (epipelagic waters). Its range may be circumpolar with an Antarctic and Sub-Antarctic distribution.

== Ecology ==
It preys upon Antarctic krill, Antarctic silverfish and other squids. However, Isotopic evidence suggests a diet in prey that are likely mesopelagic zooplankton that feed on sinking organic matter.
