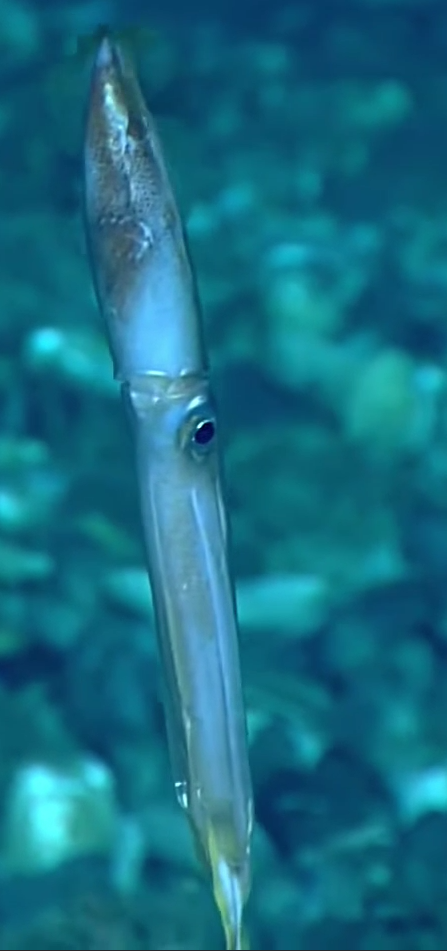
- Neoteuthis thielei

Conservation status
- Least Concern (IUCN 3.1)

Scientific classification
- Kingdom: Animalia
- Phylum: Mollusca
- Class: Cephalopoda
- Order: Oegopsida
- Family: Neoteuthidae
- Genus: Neoteuthis; Naef, 1921
- Species: N. thielei

Binomial name
- Neoteuthis thielei Naef, 1921

= Neoteuthis =

Genus of squids

Neoteuthis is a monotypic genus of squid whose sole member is Neoteuthis thielei, from the family Neoteuthidae. This species has long tentacular clubs measuring 60% of the mantle length and fins which are 70% of its mantle length. It has a proximal locking-apparatus for the club which is restricted to manus, which in turn has proximal suckers which are circular. It has been recorded from the South Atlantic Ocean, North Atlantic Ocean, near the Canary Islands and North Pacific Ocean, north of Hawaii. The paralarvae and juveniles are found in the epipelagic to mesopelagic zones while adults occur in the mesopelagic to bathypelagic zones.
