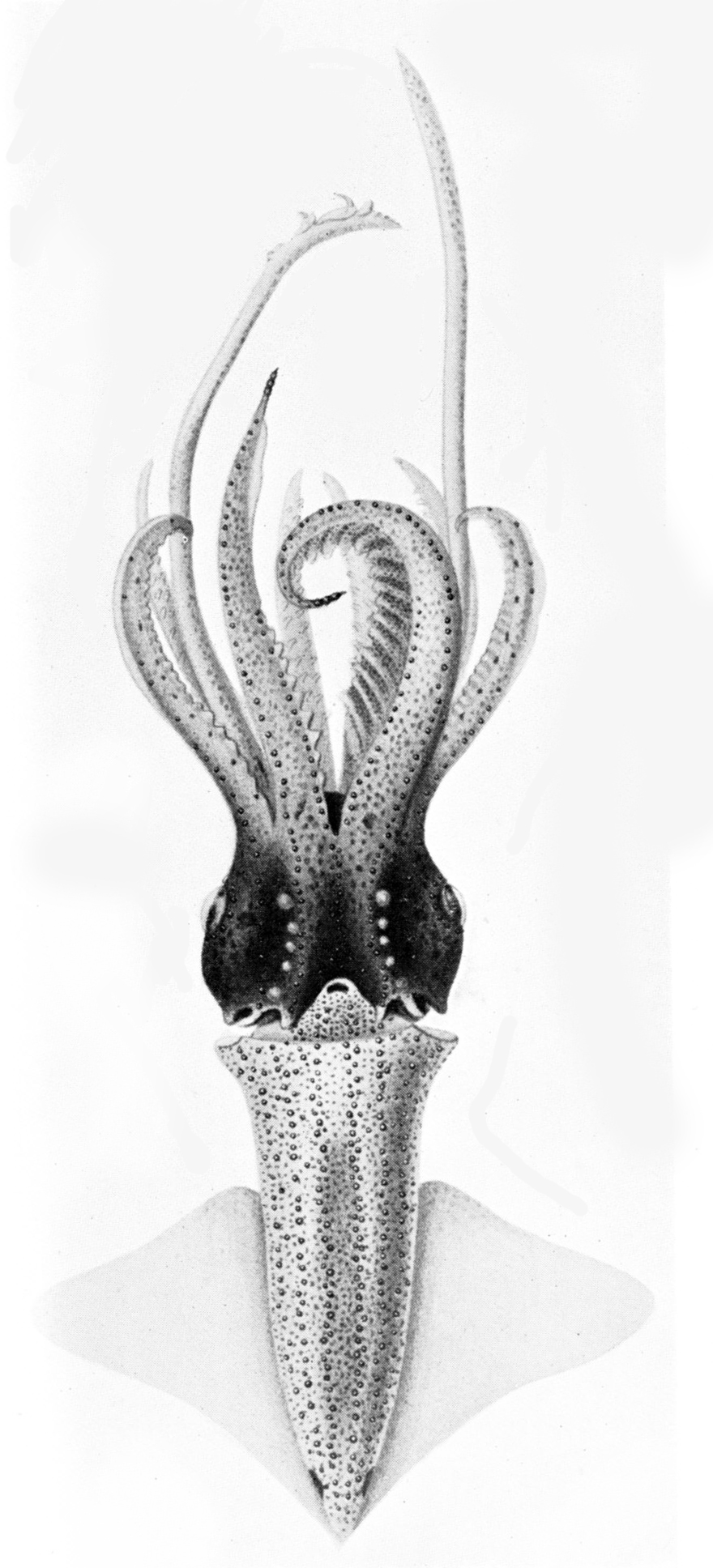

Conservation status
- Least Concern (IUCN 3.1)

Scientific classification
- Kingdom: Animalia
- Phylum: Mollusca
- Class: Cephalopoda
- Order: Oegopsida
- Family: Enoploteuthidae
- Genus: Abraliopsis
- Subgenus: Abraliopsis
- Species: A. morisii

Binomial name
- Abraliopsis morisii (Vérany, 1839)

Synonyms
- Onychoteuthis morisii Vérany, 1839 (basionym); Abraliopsis (Abraliopsis) morisii (Verany, 1839); Abraliopsis pfefferi Joubin, 1896; Abralia pfefferi (Joubin, 1896); Teleoteuthis caribaea Jatta, 1896; Compsoteuthis loennbergi Pfeffer, 1900; Abralia jattai Pfeffer, 1912; Abralia (Compsoteuthis) jattai Pfeffer, 1912; Abralia lonnbergi Pfeffer, 1912; Abralia (Compsoteuthis) lonnbergi Pfeffer, 1912; Abralia (Nepioteuthion) lonnbergi Pfeffer, 1912; Abralia mediterranea Pfeffer, 1912; Abralia (Nepioteuthion) mediterranea Pfeffer, 1912

= Abraliopsis morisii =

Species of mollusc

Abraliopsis morisii is a species of bioluminescent squid in the family Enoploteuthidae. The species occurs in tropical to warm temperate waters in the Atlantic Ocean, including the Gulf of Mexico and the Mediterranean Sea, within the epipelagic and mesopelagic zones.

== Description ==
Mature males of the species can reach a mantle length of 25 to 27 millimetres (0.98 to 1.06 in), while females reach a mantle length of 32 to 33 millimetres (1.3 to 1.3 in). The integumental photophores are scattered randomly and it has five ocular photophores. The hectocotylus contains a long flap at the ventral margin and a short flap at the dorsal margin.

== Distribution ==
The species occurs in the Atlantic Ocean, Mediterranean Sea, and the Gulf of Mexico, at depths of 15 to 3,417.5 metres (49 to 11,212 ft) in temperatures between 2 and 23 °C (36 and 73 °F). It has been found in areas with high nitrate, salinity, phosphate, and oxygen levels and also in areas with low silicate concentrations. It occurs over a large area and is classified as a least-concern species by the IUCN.

== Life cycle ==
Male specimens of A. morisii mature at an age of between 120 and 130 days old, and females mature at 150 and 160 days old, though females may mature at 127 days and males at 105 days. Females may have between 6,500 and 21,000 oocytes, which are 1.0 to 1.1 millimetres (0.039 to 0.043 in) long. Paralarval or juvenile specimens have been identified from eddies within the North Atlantic ocean.

== Gallery ==
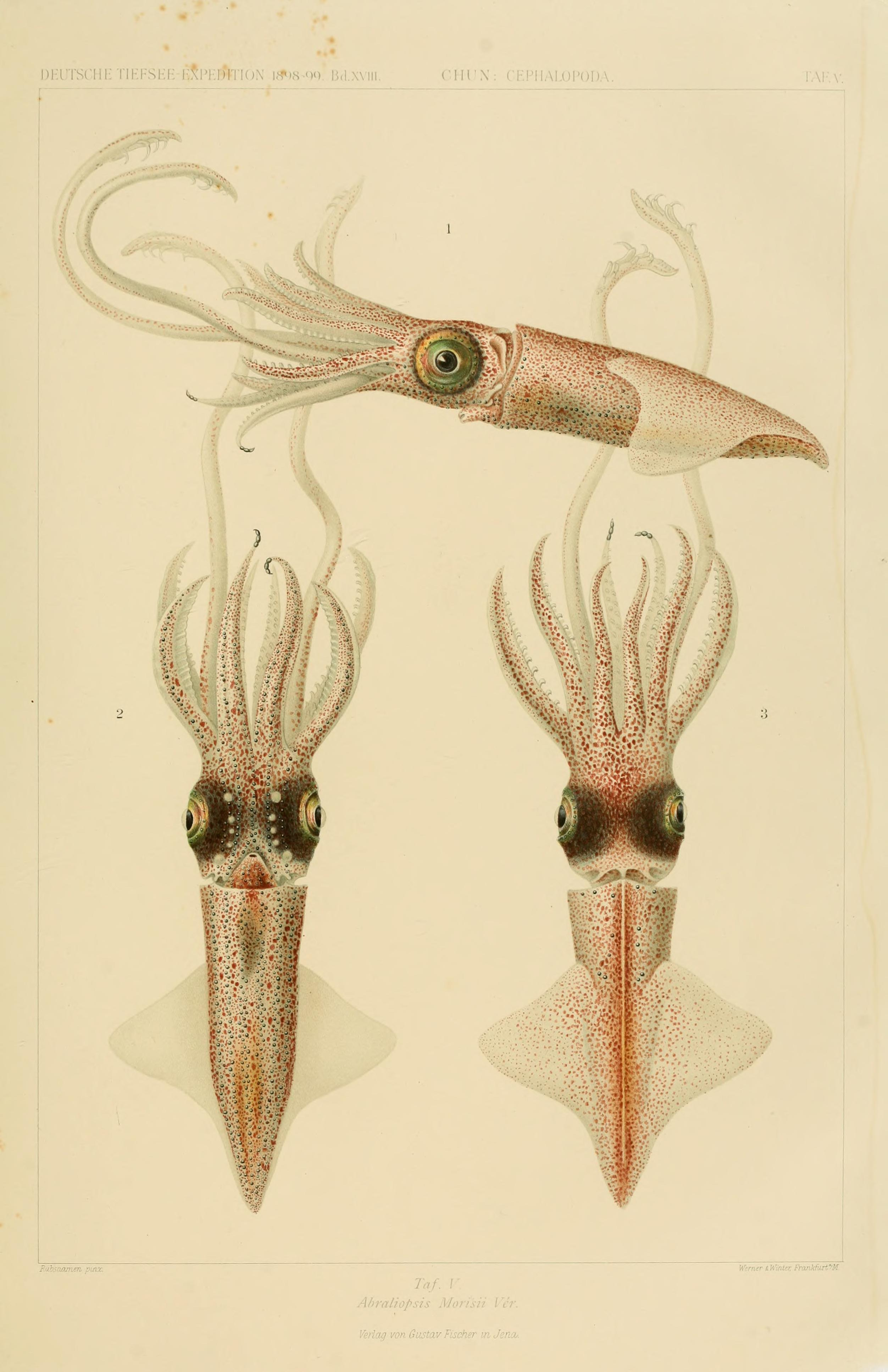
Abraliopsis morisii from Carl Chun's Die Cephalopoden

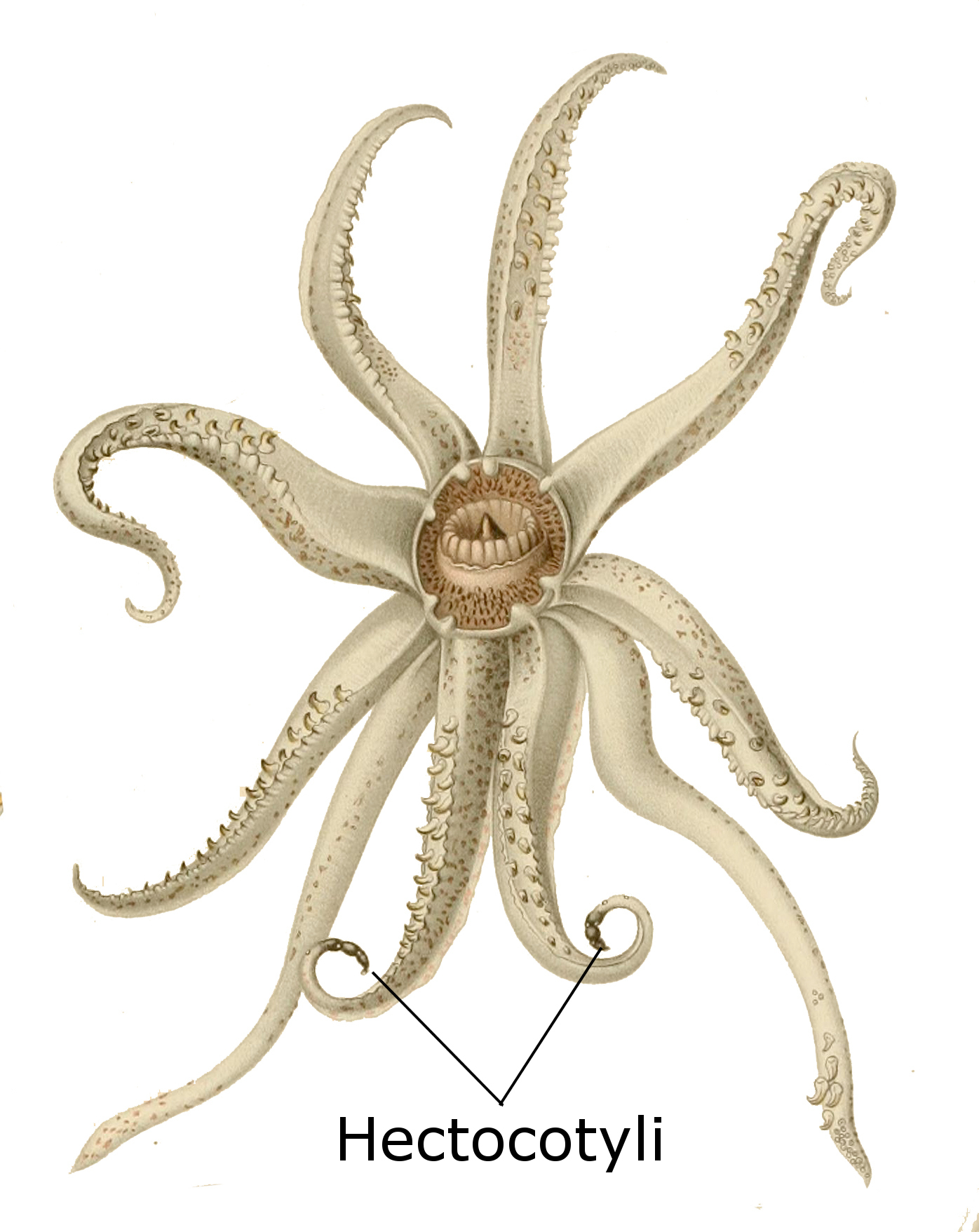
Abraliopsis morisi hectocotylus from Carl Chun's Die Cephalopoden
