= Gonatopsis =

Scientific classification
- Kingdom: Animalia
- Phylum: Mollusca
- Class: Cephalopoda
- Order: Oegopsida
- Family: Gonatidae
- Genus: Gonatopsis; Sasaki, 1920

Type species
- Gonatopsis octopedatus Sasaki, 1920

Synonyms
- Eogonatus Nesis, 1972

Genus of squids

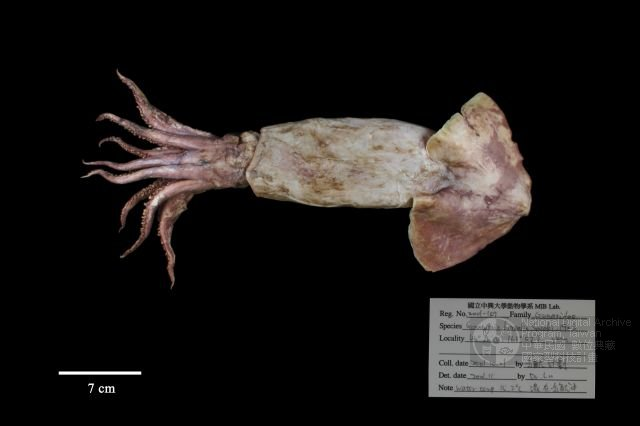
Gonatopsis borealis

Gonatopsis is a genus of squid from the family Gonatidae. They are characterised by the loss of their tentacles by the time they have reach the subadult stage. They have arms which have two series of hooks along the midline of the oral surface arms, the radula has five or seven teeth, the mantle can be muscular or flabby, fins are rhomboid or arrow shaped and they lack photophores. They are found in the North Pacific.

== Species ==
The following species have been classified as belonging to Gonatopsis:

- Gonatopsis borealis Sasaki, 1923
- Gonatopsis japonicus Okiyama, 1969
- Gonatopsis makko Okutani & Nemoto, 1964
- Gonatopsis octopedatus Sasaki, 1920
- Gonatopsis okutanii * Nesis, 1972

The species listed above with an asterisk (*) is a taxon inquirendum and needs further study to determine if it is a valid species or a synonym.
