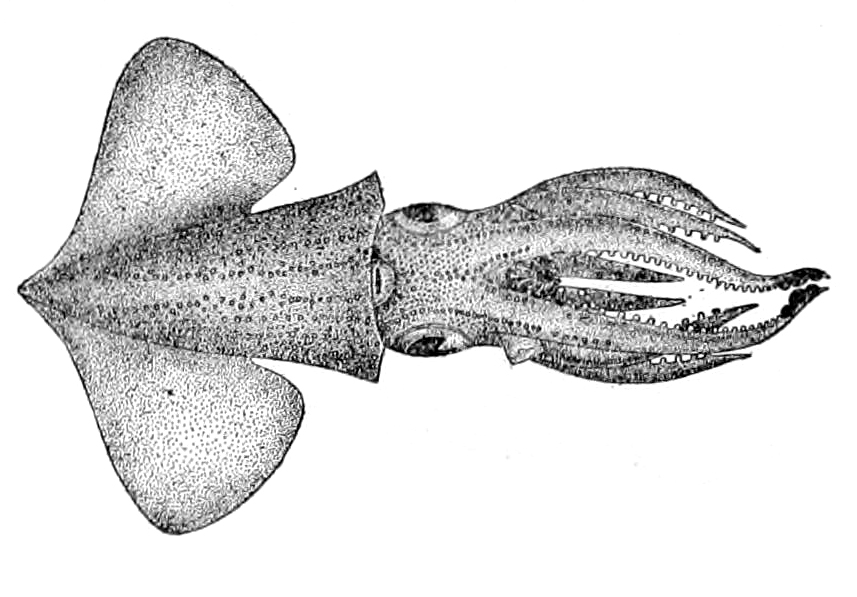
- Abraliopsis sp.

Scientific classification
- Domain: Eukaryota
- Kingdom: Animalia
- Phylum: Mollusca
- Class: Cephalopoda
- Order: Oegopsida
- Family: Enoploteuthidae
- Genus: Abraliopsis; Joubin, 1896

Type species
- Enoploteuthis hoylei (Pfeffer, 1884)

Subgenera
- Abraliopsis; Boreabraliopsis; Micrabralia; Pfefferiteuthis

Synonyms
- Apraliopsis Dall, 1909; Micrabralia Pfeffer, 1900

= Abraliopsis =

Genus of molluscs

Abraliopsis is a marine genus of squid (family Enoploteuthidae) of the phylum Mollusca. Not much is known about Abraliopsis due to the evading ability of pelagic cephalopods. Features that distinguish these species include the absence of arm suckers, size and number of hooks on arms, the presence of photophores, and the formation and position of chromatophores. 11 species that make up the Enoploteuthidae family.

== Species ==
The following species are listed as members of the genus Abraliopsis:

- Subgenus Abraliopsis Joubin, 1896
  - Abraliopsis hoylei (Pfeffer, 1884)
  - Abraliopsis morisii (Vérany, 1839), Pfeffer's enope squid
  - Abraliopsis pacificus Tsuchiya & Okutani, 1990
  - Abraliopsis tui Riddell, 1985
- Subgenus Boreabraliopsis Tsuchiya & Okutani, 1988
  - Abraliopsis felis McGowan & Okutani, 1968
- Subgenus Micrabralia Pfeffer, 1900
  - Abraliopsis gilchristi Robson, 1924
  - Abraliopsis lineata Goodrich, 1896
- Subgenus Pfefferiteuthis Tsuchiya & Okutani, 1988
  - Abraliopsis affinis (Pfeffer, 1912)
  - Abraliopsis atlantica Nesis, 1982
  - Abraliopsis chuni Nesis, 1982
  - Abraliopsis falco Young, 1972

== Geographic Distribution ==
Abraliopsis species usually exist in tropical and subtropical habitats, with a high presence in the coastal regions of California and Mexico, including the Gulf of Mexico. Other species of Abraliopsis are present down the eastern Pacific coast streaming into the regions of Chile, Ecuador and Columbia. Abraliopsis species also are present in coastal Indian/African regions but are poorly studied,

== Feeding and Ecological Importance ==
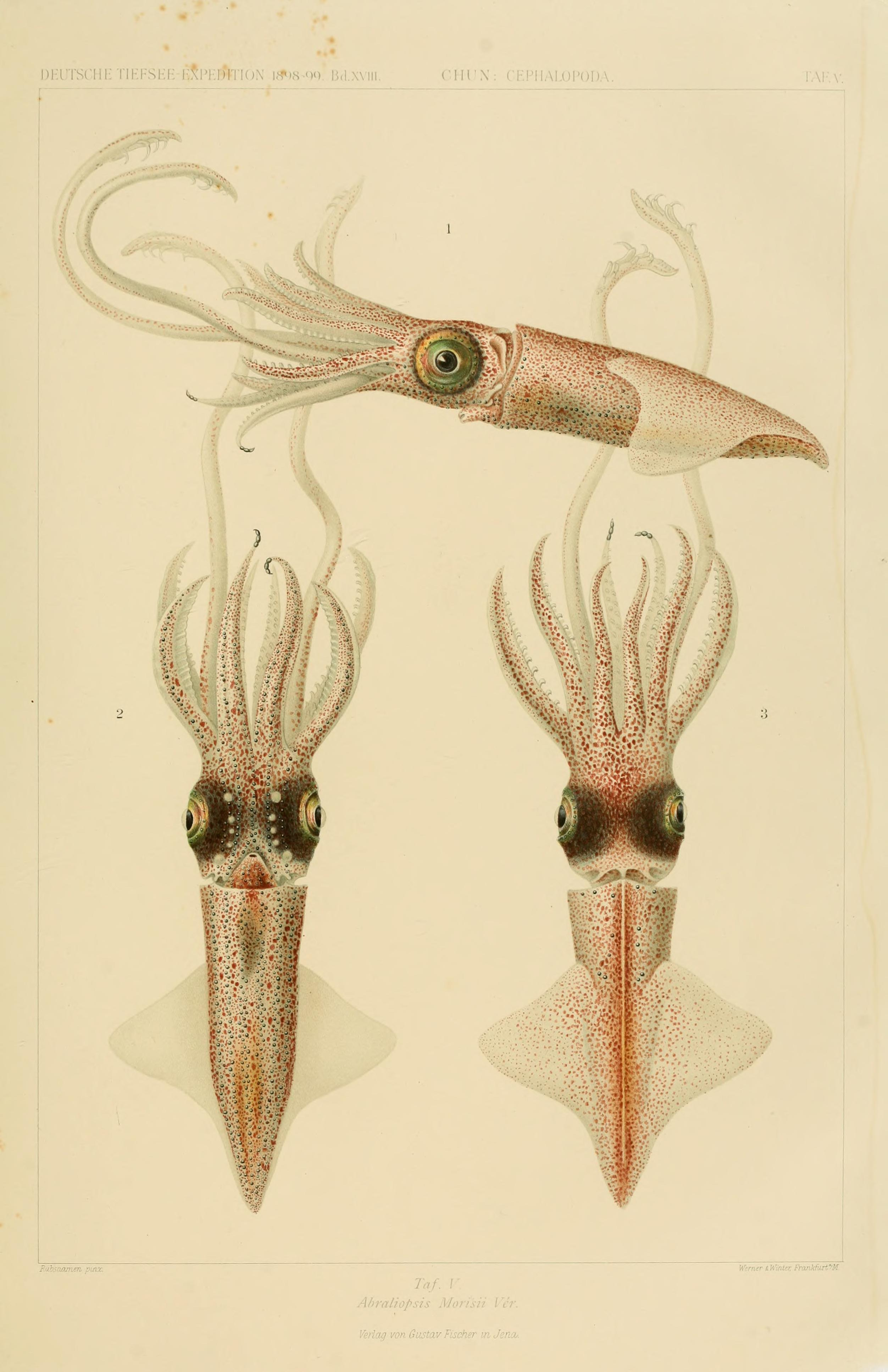
Illustration of Abraliopsis morrisii, a bioluminescent species of Abraliopsis

Similar to other small marine organisms, Abraliopsis follow the diel vertical migration feeding pattern to feed near the surface at night. This is a common strategy for vulnerable organisms to avoid predators while feeding. Pelagic marine organisms and seabirds prey on Abraliopsis. Abraliopsis was found in the stomach contents of a variety of common marine fish and seabirds. Abraliopsis are also members of the micronekton community near seamounts. Juveniles and paralarvae of some cephalopods may be related to primary production in upwelling areas, which are nutrient dense areas that support the marine ecosystem.

== Morphology ==
Abraliopsis are characterized by the presence of photophores on the ventral surface of the head and protective membranes on left arm IV.

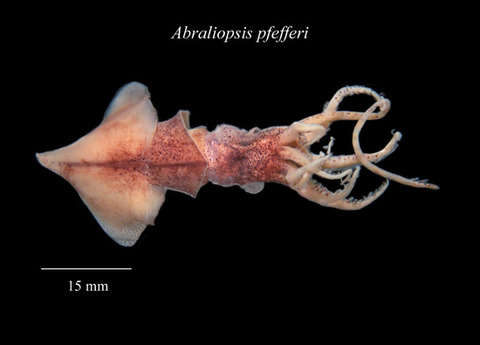
Preserved specimen of Abraliopsis pfefferi.

Abraliopsis pfefferi undergo constant bodily growth with a clear size difference between male and female individuals. Size variation occurs within each sex. Maturation age differ amongst the males and females, with 120-130 days for males and 150-160 days for females. Males have a shorter overall maturation time than females. Mantle length grows at a relatively slow speed of 0.5–0.6% every day.
