= Abraliopsis atlantica =

Conservation status
- Data Deficient (IUCN 3.1)

Scientific classification
- Kingdom: Animalia
- Phylum: Mollusca
- Class: Cephalopoda
- Order: Oegopsida
- Family: Enoploteuthidae
- Genus: Abraliopsis
- Subgenus: Pfefferiteuthis
- Species: A. atlantica

Binomial name
- Abraliopsis atlantica Nesis, 1982

Species of mollusc

Abraliopsis atlantica is a species of enoploteuthid cephalopod found in the tropical and subtropical Atlantic Ocean, including the Caribbean Sea, the Gulf of Mexico and the Benguela Current. Female oocytes are around 1 mm in length and number between 4,000 and 29,000 in mature females. There is a lack of information about the species and it is rated as data deficient by the International Union for Conservation of Nature (IUCN) due to this. It was described by Kir Nesis in 1982.

== Description ==
Its ventral hooks are thrice as long as the dorsal hooks and the species lacks a carpal flap. Females live for up to five months and males live for up to three-and-a-half months. It has long arms and its hectocotylus contains two flaps of similar sizes and the species' ventral head contains three longitudinal stripes and its ventral mantle contains six, all of which are narrow. A. atlantica reaches a length of around 20 millimetres (0.79 in) in maturity. Females have between 4,000 and 29,000 oocytes in maturity which are around 1 mm long. A 1999 study of fourteen female specimens found that they had mantle lengths of 17 to 35 millimetres (0.67 to 1.38 in).

== Distribution ==
It is located in the northwestern, southeastern, and western central (subtropical and tropical) Atlantic Ocean, the Caribbean Sea, the Benguela Current, and the Gulf of Mexico. The species is native to Namibia and figures regarding its population are unknown. It has been observed at the surface during the day and at 100 to 150 metres (330 to 490 ft) below the surface during the night when it feeds, but is thought to mostly live in mid-depths. The IUCN has classed the conservation status of Abraliopsis atlantica as data deficient due to the lack of information regarding the species and its threats are unknown due to this. It falls under no conservation actions.

== Taxonomy ==
Abraliopsis atlantica was described by Nesis in 1982.
