= Gonatopsis japonicus =

Conservation status
- Data Deficient (IUCN 3.1)

Scientific classification
- Kingdom: Animalia
- Phylum: Mollusca
- Class: Cephalopoda
- Order: Oegopsida
- Family: Gonatidae
- Genus: Gonatopsis
- Species: G. japonicus

Binomial name
- Gonatopsis japonicus Okiyama, 1969

Species of squid

Gonatopsis japonicus is a species of squid from the family Gonatidae. This species is restricted to the western North Pacific in the seas around the Japanese archipelago.

== Description ==
Gonatopsis japonicus is a squid with a slender, muscular mantle. It is relatively large with thin fins and a long, pointed tail. The head is wider than the opening of the mantle. It has robust arms that are armed with heavy hooks. These arms are of different lengths, the longest being just over half the length of the mantle. There are five rows of teeth on the radula. Tentacles are absent in adults. It is a large species that grows to a mantle length of 620mm.

== Distribution ==
Gonatopsis japonicus is restricted to the western North Pacific in the Sea of Japan north to the southern Okhotsk Sea and it may also occur off the eastern coast of Japan. It has also been reported from the Kuril Islands east to the central and eastern Bering Sea.

== Habitat and biology ==
Gonatopsis japonicus appears to mature at a relatively small size of approximately 150 mm in mantle length, and this is indicated by the development of hooks on the arms and the drak pigmentation of the beak. This species can be found from the epipelagic zone down into the mesopelagic and bathypelagic zones, with specimens having been taken from midwater at depths from near the surface to 1000m and from the sea bed at depths from 400m to 2000m. In the Sea of Japan this species was most abundant in the upper 140 m, and its abundance rapidly declined with increasing depth. The regular capturing of juveniles and young adults in the surface layers suggests that this species is an active vertical migrant, it further suggests that its ontogenetic descent takes place relatively late in its life cycle. Most of the specimens taken up to now have been immature or they were newly mature. In the Okhotsk Sea measurements of mature and pre-spawning males from the mesopelagic and bathypelagic zones gave mantle lengths which ranged from 278mm to 478mm, while immature and maturing females mantle lengths ranged from 398mm to 582mm. The largest specimen taken had a mantle length of 620mm. As the squid matures the muscle tissues in its body become increasingly gelatinous.

== Human use ==
Gonatopsis japonicus is not utilised by humans.
