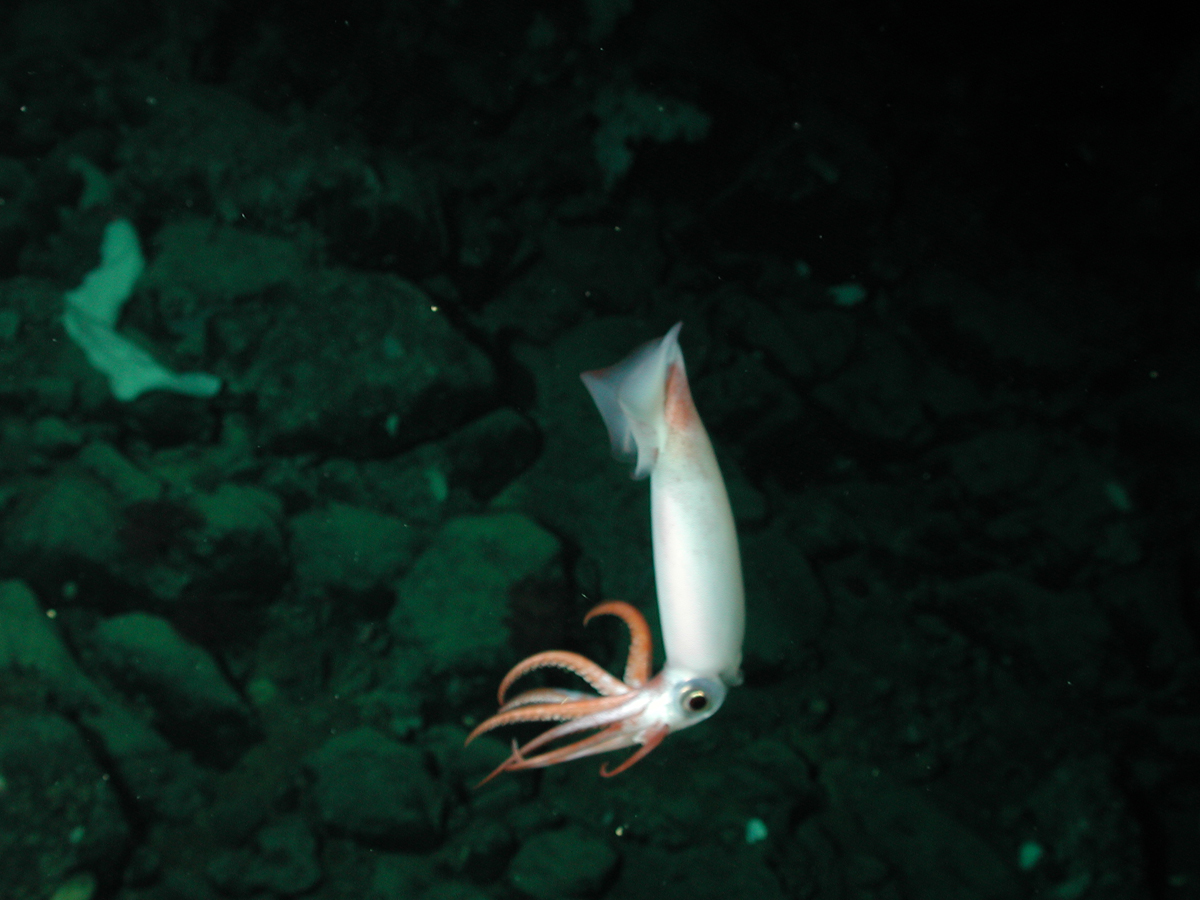
- Gonatus onyx

Scientific classification
- Domain: Eukaryota
- Kingdom: Animalia
- Phylum: Mollusca
- Class: Cephalopoda
- Order: Oegopsida
- Family: Gonatidae
- Genus: Gonatus; Gray, 1849

Type species
- Onychoteuthis amoena Møller, 1842

= Gonatus =

Genus of squids

Gonatus is a genus of squid in the family Gonatidae, comprising twelve species, and therefore containing the most species in the family. Adult squid belonging to species in this genus are notable for their lack of tentacles.

The genus contains bioluminescent species.

== Species ==
Species name	Year described	Mantle length
Gonatus antarcticus	1898	230 mm
Gonatus berryi	1923	240 mm
Gonatus californiensis	1972	315 mm
Gonatus fabricii	1818	129 mm
Gonatus kamtschaticus	1849	300 mm
Gonatus madokai	1977	329 mm
Gonatus middendorffi	1981	225 mm
Gonatus onyx	1972	145 mm
Gonatus oregonensis	1985	Young squid- 46 mm
Gonatus pyros	1972	160 mm
Gonatus steenstrupi	1981	94 mm
Gonatus ursabrunae	1985	Young squid- 25 mm
