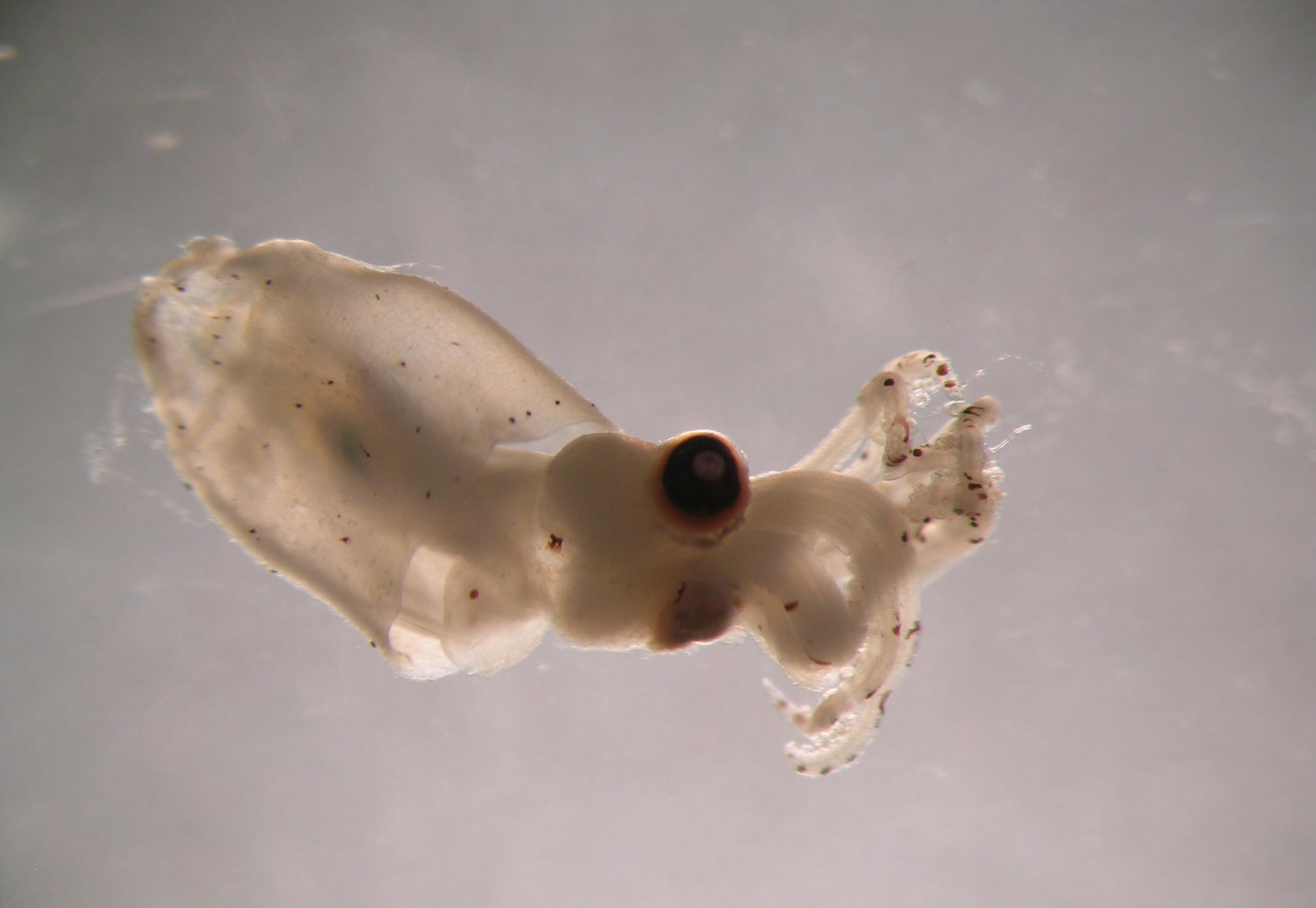

Conservation status
- Least Concern (IUCN 3.1)

Scientific classification
- Domain: Eukaryota
- Kingdom: Animalia
- Phylum: Mollusca
- Class: Cephalopoda
- Order: Oegopsida
- Family: Enoploteuthidae
- Genus: Abraliopsis
- Subgenus: Boreabraliopsis
- Species: A. felis

Binomial name
- Abraliopsis felis McGowan & Okutani, 1968

= Abraliopsis felis =

Species of mollusc

Abraliopsis felis is a species of enoploteuthid cephalopod found in cool temperate water of the north Pacific Ocean. Female oocytes measure 1.5 mm in length.
