= Abraliopsis tui =

Conservation status
- Data Deficient (IUCN 3.1)

Scientific classification
- Domain: Eukaryota
- Kingdom: Animalia
- Phylum: Mollusca
- Class: Cephalopoda
- Order: Oegopsida
- Family: Enoploteuthidae
- Genus: Abraliopsis
- Subgenus: Abraliopsis
- Species: A. tui

Binomial name
- Abraliopsis tui Riddell, 1985

Species of mollusc

Abraliopsis tui is a species of enoploteuthid cephalopod found in the waters around New Zealand and the Kermadec Islands.
