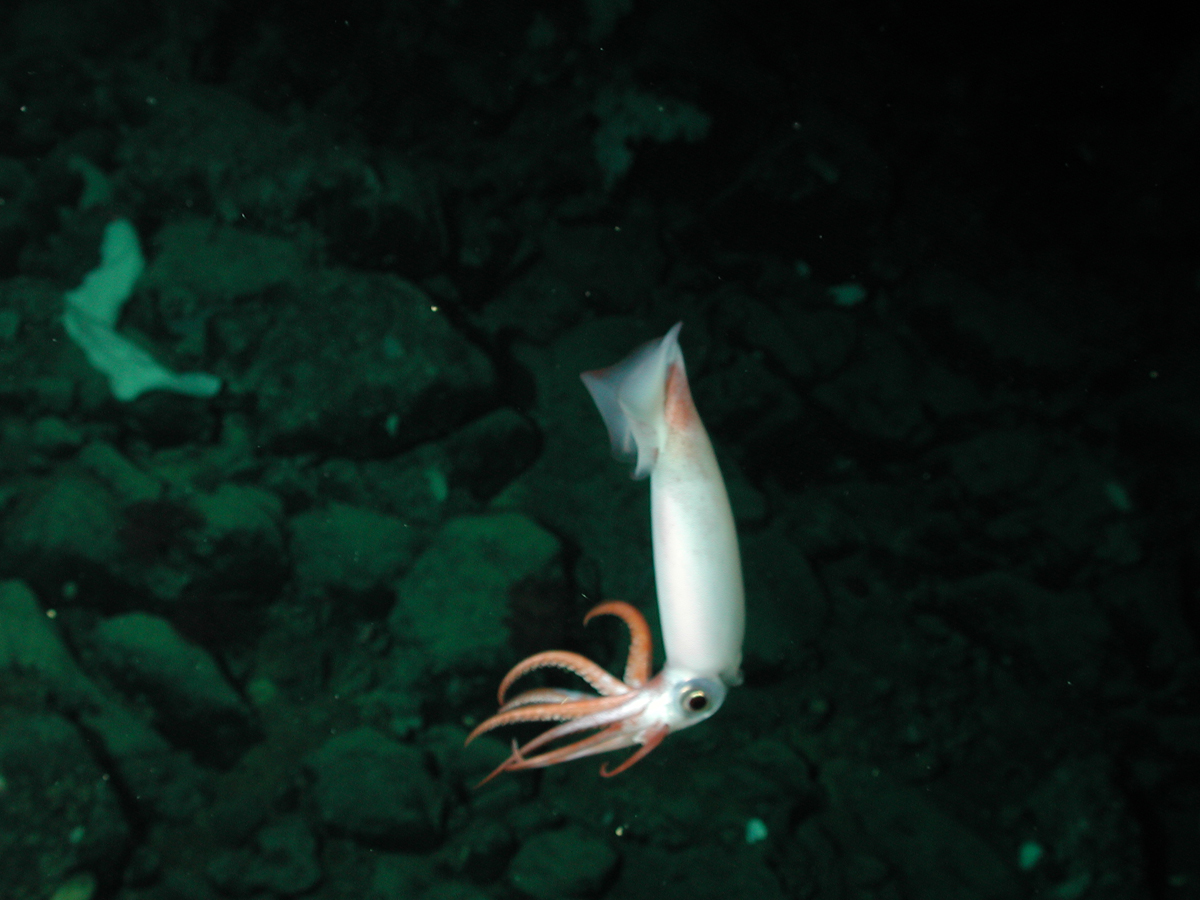
- Gonatus onyx on the Davidson Seamount at 1,328 m depth.

Conservation status
- Least Concern (IUCN 3.1)

Scientific classification
- Kingdom: Animalia
- Phylum: Mollusca
- Class: Cephalopoda
- Order: Oegopsida
- Family: Gonatidae
- Genus: Gonatus
- Species: G. onyx

Binomial name
- Gonatus onyx Young, 1972

= Gonatus onyx =

Clawed armhook squid

Species of squid

Gonatus onyx is in the class Cephalopoda and in the phylum Mollusca. It is also known as the clawed arm hook squid or the black-eyed squid. It got these names from the characteristic black eye and from its two arms with clawed hooks on the end that extend a bit further than the other arms. It is a squid in the family Gonatidae, found most commonly in the northern Pacific Ocean from Japan to California. They are one of the most abundant cephalopods off the coast of California, mostly found at deeper depths, rising during the day most likely to feed.

The mantle size of G. onyx has been known to reach up to 18 cm (7.1 in). G. onyx size varies from region to region, with larger members of the species being found in warmer areas.

The type specimen was collected off the coast of California and was deposited at the Santa Barbara Museum of Natural History.

== Range and habitat ==
G. onyx is a very common cephalopod that is found in the Northern Pacific Ocean, ranging from coastal California to the east coast of Japan, and are found as far north as the Bering Sea. They are one of the most abundant cephalopods found in coastal California and are distributed with a latitude from 30°N to 43°N. In these locations, they are typically found over the basin, shelf and shelf breaks, with a low variation in abundance.

The adults and juveniles inhabit different areas, with the more solitary adults tending to like deeper water and the pack hunting juveniles preferring shallow coastal waters. They have one of the lowest seasonal variations over wide areas from the members of the family Gonatidae. The depth distribution is bimodal and follows a certain diel rhythm. During the day they tend to stay at deeper depths with adults found at 400–1,000 m (1,300–3,300 ft), with an average depth of around 700 m (2,300 ft). Younger members are found at 0–800 m (0–2,625 ft) during the day with an average of around 400 m (1,300 ft). During the night both adults and juveniles tend to rise from the deeper water. Adults at night have a range of depths of 100–800 m (330–2,620 ft) with a large majority found around 400–500 m (1,300–1,600 ft). Juveniles have a smaller range of 0–500 m (0–1,640 ft) and are more evenly spread out with most found at 0–300 m (0–984 ft). When laying eggs, female G. onyx have been found at even deeper depths. They have been observed holding egg mass in their arms between 1,500 and 2,600 m (4,900 and 8,500 ft), with one female seen brooding an egg mass in Monterey Canyon at a depth of 1,590 m (5,220 ft).

== Anatomy and morphology ==
G. onyx is a relatively smaller-sized squid with an average mantle length of about 12 cm (4.7 in), with some warmer water individuals reaching up to 18 cm (7.1 in). This species shows sexual dimorphism in mantle size with females maturing faster and growing a couple of centimeters larger than the males. The mantle makes up a majority of their body length, the arms make up another about 40 mm (1.6 in) on average. It has characteristic black eyes on either side of its head, these highly developed sensory organs are helpful for hunting in pitch black conditions. The armature consists of five pairs, one pair with a large primary hook at the end and multiple rows of suckers, the other four pairs are generally shorter and do not have this tentacular hook, still lined with rows of suckers. The use of clawed arms are thought to be used in hunting and for better catching and handling of their prey. Some individuals are harder to identify as the tentacular club is very fragile and easily damaged. The mantle's fins are smaller than the other members of Gonatids and the tail is less tapered. G. onyx like most squid move using a propulsive force, using water expelled from a siphon with the combination of fin movements. The juvenile G. onyx has been observed using ink as a defensive mechanism and as a propulsive force, while the adults rarely use ink and rather choose to use a faster propulsive force. Matured members possess chromatophores, specialized small organs under the skin of the squid, which are used to change colors to hide reflective internal organs. They have a beak, like all cephalopods; it is relatively small compared to other species. The upper part of the beak is sharp and has less curvature, while the bottom is curved, duller, and shorter. This specialized beak makes it easier for squid to attack prey larger than themselves.

== Reproduction and post-spawning egg care ==
G. onyx, like most cephalopods, are oviparous organisms, meaning they lay eggs outside of their bodies. Females lay their eggs from April to July, brooding them for about six to nine months until the hatchlings are ready to emerge in depths exceeding 2,500 m (8,200 ft). The extended duration dedicated to egg development and nurturing could potentially function as an evolutionary adaptation, facilitating the emergence of highly developed paralarvae. These juveniles possess the ability to embark on extensive vertical migrations towards shallower waters abundant in nutrients. Throughout this gestation period, females sustain themselves with stored lipids from the digestive gland. Like most squids, the species are believed to be semelparous animals, meaning they reproduce only once before perishing.

To fertilize the female eggs, male squids employ specialized arms to deliver sperm packets, known as spermatophores, to the female's seminal receptacle—a specialized internal oviduct near her mouth. Notably, female G. onyx exhibit a distinctive behavior: they cradle the egg mass with their hooked arms, a response to the loss of their tentacles post-fertilization, as they cannot feed while holding their eggs. Once the egg masses are laid, females migrate to deep waters, a strategic move to evade potential predators. Encased within a black jelly-like substance, the eggs reside in individual chambers connected by a delicate membrane. Each egg is oval in shape, and range in size from 2.0 mm to 3.0 mm in length, and 1.8 mm to 2.1 mm in width. Remarkably, a single egg mass can contain anywhere from 2,000 to 5,000 hatchlings.

== Early life and behavior ==
The hatchling's physiology is very different from mature individuals. Hatching specimens collected were found to be moderately large at a total length of 5.0mm. The mantle length of these hatchlings ranged from 3.2 mm – 3.5 mm and the width was 50–60% of the mantle length. Arms and tentacles are very different, there are 4 pairs of arms that are about 18–20% of the mantle size. Arm pairs 1 and 2 have suckers and sucker buds, arm pairs 3 and 4 lack suckers. There are one pair of tentacles that are proportionally larger than the arm pairs at around 40% of mantle length on average, they both contain a large number of sucker buds and the central hook is not yet visible. Hatchlings can be identified by a characteristic chromatophore pattern, with 5–6 in a single row on the aboral surface of the tentacles, a single pair on the base of the fins on the dorsal mantle, a single pair at the anterior end of the hatching gland on the mid-dorsal mantle, and 2–3 pairs on the lateral mantle. Hatchlings move with the hop-and-sink swimming style. Hatchlings mature into juveniles in about 3 months and are very active schooling predators during this time, they develop their hooks on arms and tentacles. Juveniles tend to school because they have less of a tendency to go after members of the same species when they are not fully developed. They are still relatively small with a dorsal mantle length of 30 mm (1.2 in) on average. Juveniles quickly accumulate lipids to prepare for reproduction, however, the exact reason for schooling is unknown.

== Adult life and behavior ==
Individuals older than about 3 months move to deeper waters and change their entire lifestyle. Adult G. onyx are solitary hunters. As they make long vertical migrations during the night, they move closer to the surface to feed on other organisms that follow the same migration. Adults of this species have been known to be cannibalistic, with some studies indicating a rate as high as 42% of prey being of the same species. This cannibalistic behavior could serve as a reason for observed solitary behavior. Cannibalism could have evolved as a way to limit reproductive competition or as a result of low food availability in the deep waters. This explains why cannibalism is more likely to occur where there are higher densities of competing squids for food. Predators and prey from cannibalism tend to occur with individuals that are the same age and size as one another. G. Onyx also preys on fish that are around the same size as the individual, mostly composed of Stenobrachius leucopsarus. The diet of juveniles is largely unknown with some studies finding a predominant crustacean diet and then a shift to nekton when mature.

Adult and juvenile behavior differences are due to the difference in light penetration of the water from living in different depths. Adults are opaque orange and white while juveniles are clear. Adults will change between these two colors as a defense mechanism during escape of potential predators. Individuals were also observed to use ink as a form of shape mimicry. They release ink in long rope-like shapes that allow the squid to be mistaken as a different animal by predators so they can plan their escape. Adults do not exhibit the fast defense behaviors seen in juveniles because they have less predation in the deeper waters and it requires more energy consumption which is a limited resource in the deep.
