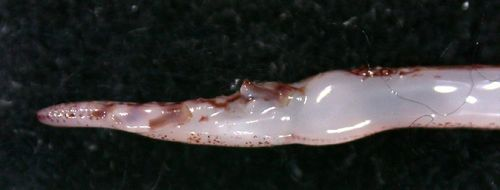
- photo:NCMI specimen MIIC-00735

Conservation status
- Least Concern (IUCN 3.1)

Scientific classification
- Kingdom: Animalia
- Phylum: Mollusca
- Class: Cephalopoda
- Order: Oegopsida
- Family: Enoploteuthidae
- Genus: Abraliopsis
- Subgenus: Micrabralia
- Species: A. gilchristi

Binomial name
- Abraliopsis gilchristi (Robson, 1924)

Synonyms
- Abralia gilchristi Robson, 1924; Enoploteuthis neozelanica Dell, 1959

= Abraliopsis gilchristi =

Species of mollusc

Abraliopsis gilchristi is a species of enoploteuthid cephalopod found in southern temperate waters of the south Pacific Ocean, from New Zealand to South Africa, where it is abundant. It undergoes a vertical daily migration, spending the day at depth and moving closer to the surface at night to feed on copepods, euphausiids and hyperiids. Spawning appears to occur between September and December. It was first described in 1924 as Abralia gilchristi by Guy Coburn Robson. The specific name honours the Scottish zoologist John Gilchrist (1866–1926) who was the first director of the Marine Biological Survey in Cape Town. The type specimen was taken off Cape Town and is held in the Natural History Museum, London.
