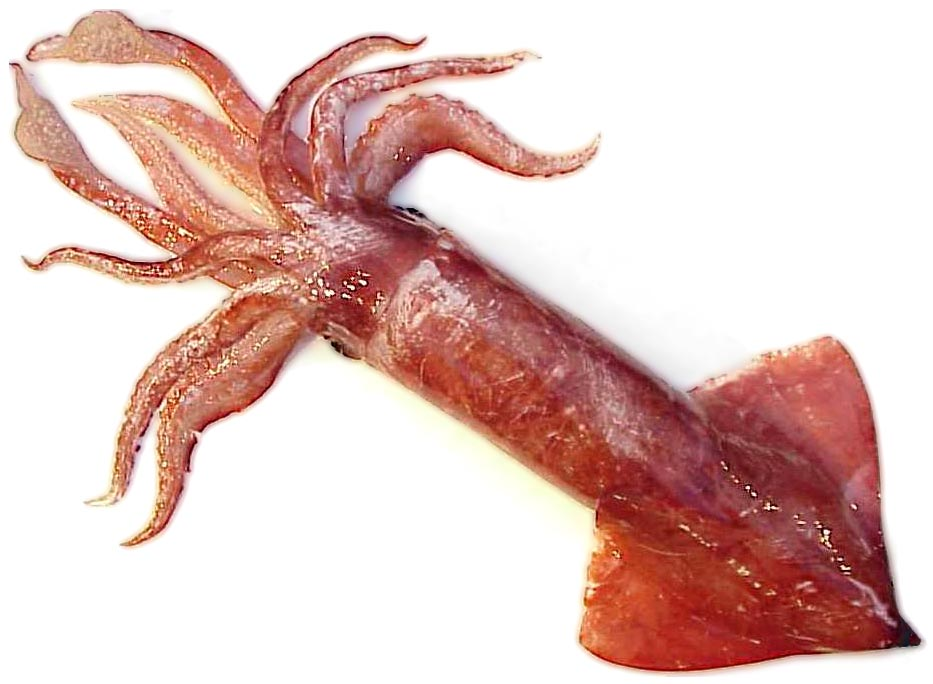
- Berryteuthis magister

Scientific classification
- Kingdom: Animalia
- Phylum: Mollusca
- Class: Cephalopoda
- Order: Oegopsida
- Family: Gonatidae; Hoyle, 1886

Type genus
- Gonatus Gray, 1849

Genera
- Berryteuthis; Gonatopsis; Gonatus

= Gonatidae =

Gonatidae Temporal range: Pliocene - recent

Family of squids

The Gonatidae, also known as armhook squid, are a family of moderately sized squid. The family contains about 19 species in three genera, widely distributed and plentiful in cold boreal waters of the Pacific Ocean. At least one species is known from Antarctic waters, and two from the North Atlantic. The genus Eogonatus was created for the species known as Eogonatus tinro because it did not have hooks on the tentacular club and it has 5 rows of teeth on the radula. Molecular studies in allozymes and mitochondrial DNA have indicated that this species nests within the genus Gonatus, although other authorities treat it as a synonym of Gonatopsis okutanii.

== Description ==
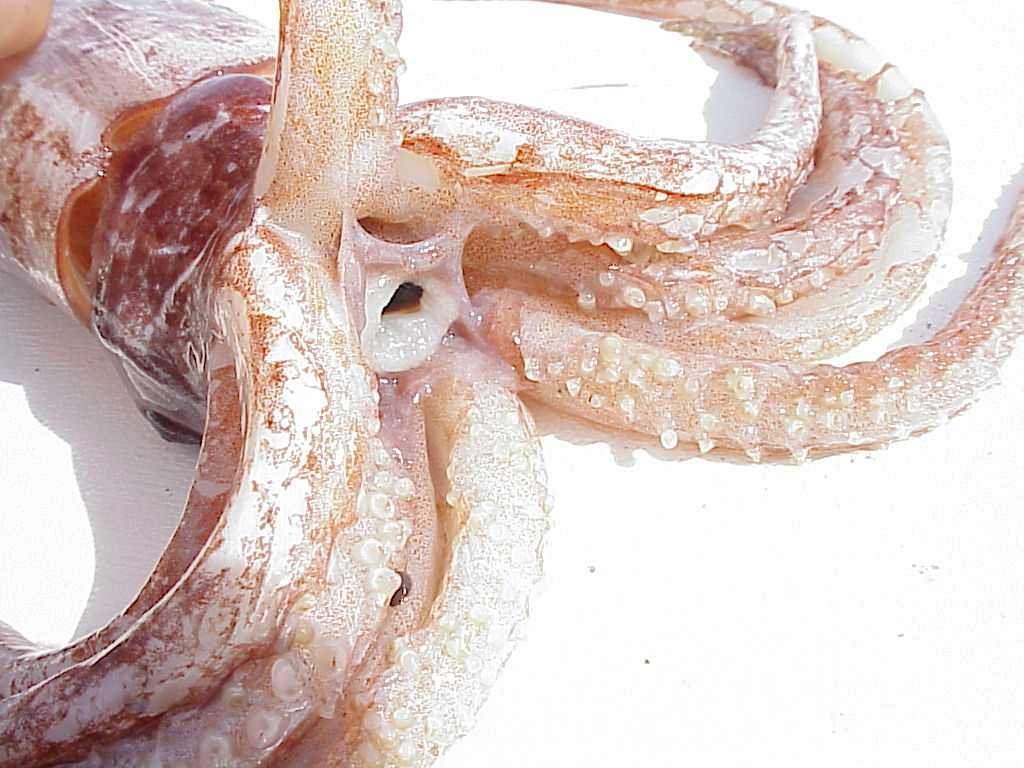
Oral view of Berryteuthis magister, showing the arrangement of suckers

Morphologically, armhook squid are fairly uniform: all species are characterised by the suckers of their arms, which are arranged in four rows (series) rather than the typical count of two. In most species, the arm's two mesial rows of suckers have been modified into hooks and the tentacular clubs—which are covered with many irregular rows of tiny suckers—may possess an enlarged central hook, with or without several smaller hooks. In the magister armhook squid (Berryteuthis magister), only the females possess hooks. Species of the genus Gonatus differ from the rest of the family (and from most squid) by their lack of tentacles as adults.

Only one species, the fiery armhook squid (Gonatus pyros), possesses photophores; these are located on the ventral periphery of the eyes.

Gonatids typically have muscular, cylindrical bodies with very soft, reddish to purplish-brown skin. The arms are thick and capable; the fins vary in shape and size, from sagittate and about 50% of the mantle length, to reniform and about 30% of the mantle length. Of moderate size, these squid range in size from 11 to 40 cm—most species are 25 cm or less. Females are somewhat larger than males.

== Life history ==
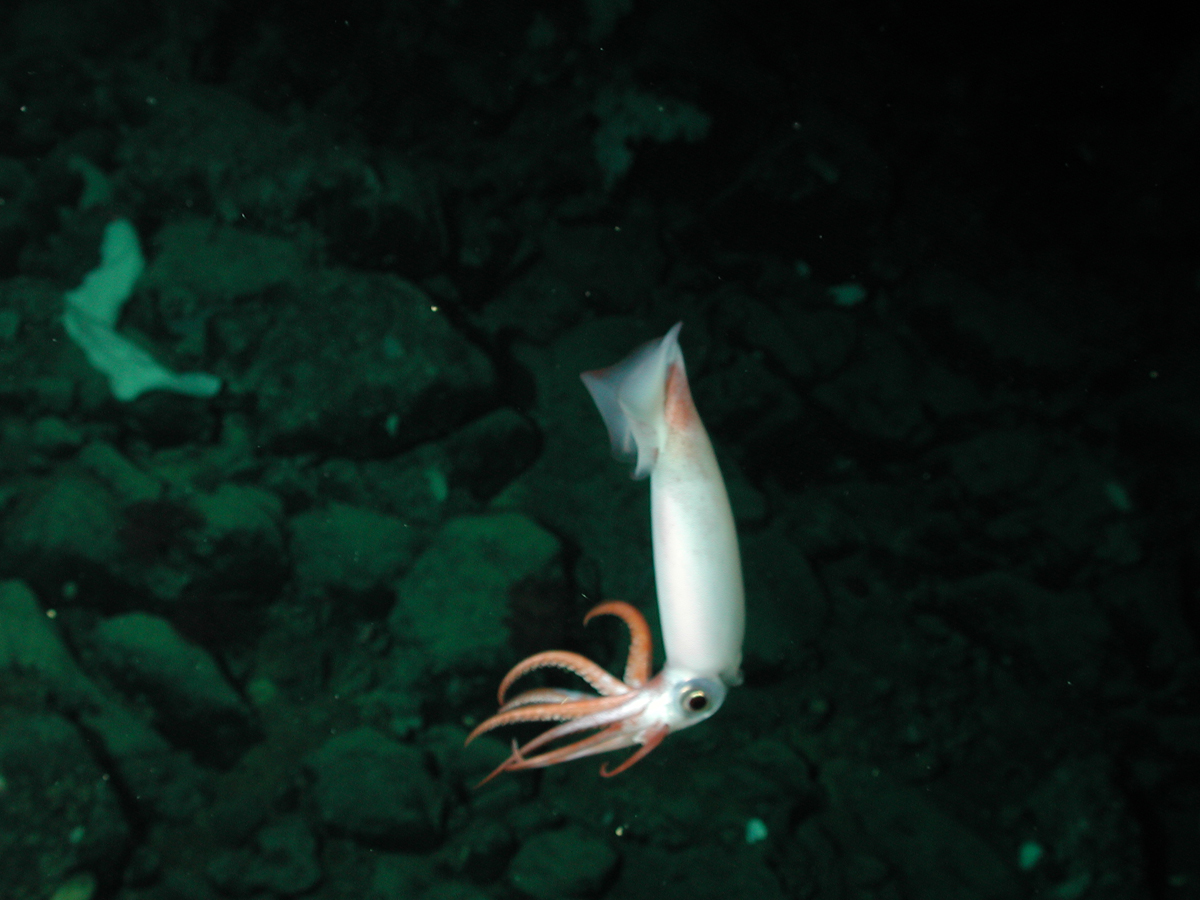
Gonatus onyx on the Davidson Seamount at a depth of 1,328 m

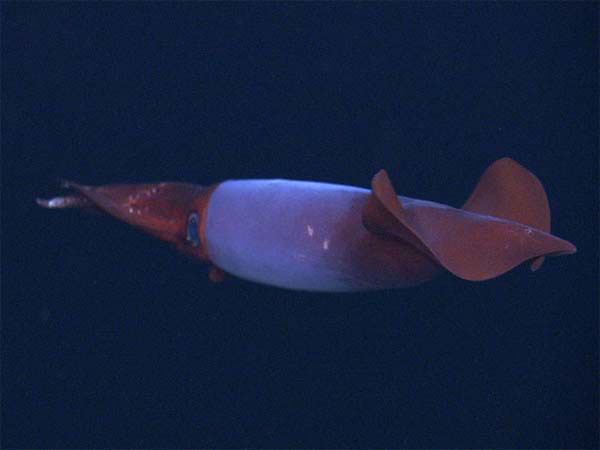
Gonatus fabricii, the boreoatlantic armhook squid

These squid are pelagic, associated with the continental shelf and may roam as deep as 4,500 m or more, depending on the species. Their habits are poorly studied, but the squid are thought to undertake diel migration; by day, the squid remain in the blackness of the depths in midwater. By night, they ascend to the upper layers of the water column to feed by starlight. One species, however, Gonatopsis octopedatus, has curiously recurved arms, suggesting a benthic existence.

Little is known about the reproductive cycle of armhook squid. Most squid species whose reproduction has been observed have been seen to deposit eggs on the sea floor, then leave the eggs to hatch on their own. Five female Gonatus onyx squids have been observed in Monterey Canyon dragging a membrane sack containing 2,000 to 3,000 developing eggs. It is uncertain if this behavior extends to other members of the family Gonatidae or if it is particular to this species.

Prey items include both benthic and pelagic species, including smaller fish, such as sculpins and juvenile pollock, crustaceans, including euphausiids and amphipods, and other squid. Cannibalism is also known to occur among the Gonatidae.

Cetaceans are important predators of gonatids; Baird's beaked whale, the narwhal, the short-finned pilot whale, Dall's porpoise, and sperm whales are all known to feed upon them. Other predators include large seabirds, northern fur seals, elephant seals, and large fish, such as grenadiers, halibut and several species of salmon. In far southern waters, Weddell seals and southern fur seals, as well as several species of albatross and penguin, feed upon Gonatus antarcticus.

== Species ==
- Genus Berryteuthis
  - Berryteuthis anonychus, minimal armhook squid
  - Berryteuthis magister
    - Berryteuthis magister magister, magister armhook squid
    - Berryteuthis magister nipponensis
    - Berryteuthis magister shevtsovi
- Genus Gonatopsis
  - Subgenus Boreoteuthis
    - Gonatopsis borealis, boreopacific armhook squid
  - Subgenus Gonatopsis
    - Gonatopsis japonicus
    - Gonatopsis makko, Makko armhook squid
    - Gonatopsis octopedatus
    - Gonatopsis okutanii *
- Genus Gonatus
  - Gonatus antarcticus
  - Gonatus berryi, Berry armhook squid
  - Gonatus californiensis, California armhook squid
  - Gonatus fabricii, boreoatlantic armhook squid
  - Gonatus kamtschaticus
  - Gonatus madokai, Madokai armhook squid
  - Gonatus onyx, clawed armhook squid or black-eyed squid
  - Gonatus oregonensis, Oregon armhook squid
  - Gonatus pyros, fiery armhook squid
  - Gonatus steenstrupi, Atlantic armhook squid
  - Gonatus ursabrunae, brown bear armhook squid

The species listed above with an asterisk (*) is questionable and needs further study to determine if it is a valid species or a synonym.
