= Gonatus californiensis =

California armhook squid

Conservation status
- Least Concern (IUCN 3.1)

Scientific classification
- Kingdom: Animalia
- Phylum: Mollusca
- Class: Cephalopoda
- Order: Oegopsida
- Family: Gonatidae
- Genus: Gonatus
- Species: G. californiensis

Binomial name
- Gonatus californiensis R.E.Young, 1972

Species of squid

Gonatus californiensis, commonly known as the California armhook squid, is a squid in the family Gonatidae. The species is endemic to the Eastern Pacific Ocean, and members of the species are gonochoric.
