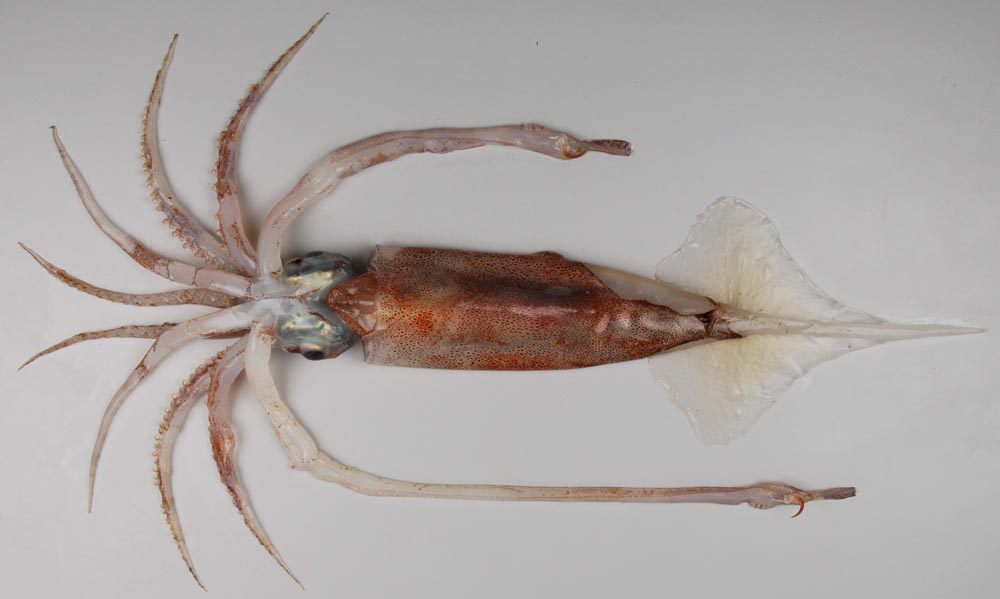
- Specimen from the Ross Sea of Antarctica (21 cm ML)

Conservation status
- Least Concern (IUCN 3.1)

Scientific classification
- Kingdom: Animalia
- Phylum: Mollusca
- Class: Cephalopoda
- Order: Oegopsida
- Family: Gonatidae
- Genus: Gonatus
- Species: G. antarcticus

Binomial name
- Gonatus antarcticus Lönnberg, 1898

= Gonatus antarcticus =

Species of squid

Gonatus antarcticus is a squid in the family Gonatidae. The species is known with certainty only from southern Atlantic waters but it may have a circum-Antarctic distribution. Historically, G. antarcticus was known to scientists only from dead specimens caught by fishermen and remains found in the bellies of larger animals. However, in December 2024, a free-swimming live squid was captured on video at 7,000 feet by a remotely operated vehicle owned by the Schmidt Ocean Institute making a film for National Geographic.

== Distribution ==
G. antarcticus occurs in waters of the Southern Ocean. Its range may be circumpolar with an Antarctic and Sub-Antarctic distribution.

== Ecology ==
This squid is eaten by several predators in the Southern Ocean, like colossal squid, sperm whales, seals and (when smaller) penguins and albatrosses.

Based on stable isotopes analysis, the squid may be a top predator in its natural habitat.
