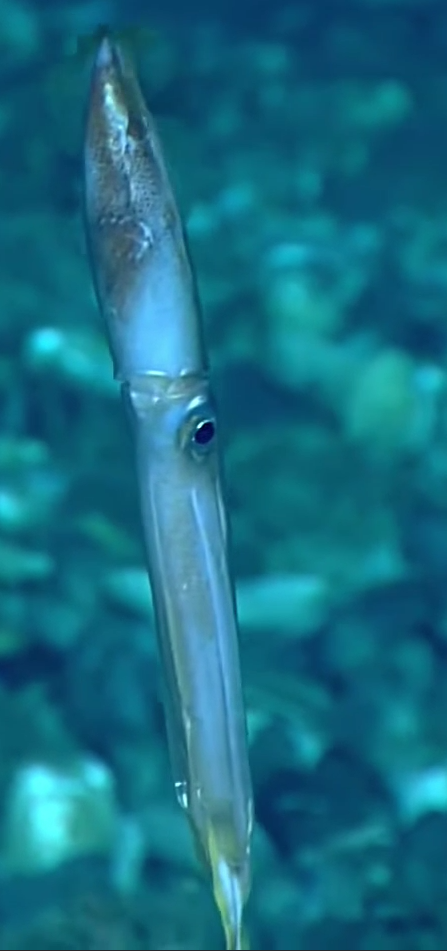
- Neoteuthis thielei

Scientific classification
- Kingdom: Animalia
- Phylum: Mollusca
- Class: Cephalopoda
- Order: Oegopsida
- Superfamily: Architeuthoidea
- Family: Neoteuthidae; Naef, 1921

Type genus
- Neoteuthis Naef, 1921

Genera
- Alluroteuthis; Narrowteuthis; Neoteuthis; Nototeuthis

Synonyms
- Alluroteuthidae Odhner, 1923

= Neoteuthidae =

Family of squids

The Neoteuthidae are a family of squid comprising four monotypic genera. They are thought to be the closest relatives to the famous giant squid (Architeuthis dux).

== Species ==
- Alluroteuthis
  - Alluroteuthis antarcticus, Antarctic neosquid
- Narrowteuthis
  - Narrowteuthis nesisi
- Neoteuthis
  - Neoteuthis thielei
- Nototeuthis
  - Nototeuthis dimegacotyle
