= Abraliopsis pacificus =

Conservation status
- Least Concern (IUCN 3.1)

Scientific classification
- Domain: Eukaryota
- Kingdom: Animalia
- Phylum: Mollusca
- Class: Cephalopoda
- Order: Oegopsida
- Family: Enoploteuthidae
- Genus: Abraliopsis
- Subgenus: Abraliopsis
- Species: A. pacificus

Binomial name
- Abraliopsis pacificus Tsuchiya & Okutani, 1990

Species of mollusc

Abraliopsis pacificus is a species of enoploteuthid cephalopod from the northwestern Pacific Ocean, from Japan to Hawaii. This species undergoes vertical migration from 900–500 m depth during the day, rising to 263–102 m depth at night. Male spermatophores are 6.5–7 mm in length.
