= Abraliopsis affinis =

Conservation status
- Least Concern (IUCN 3.1)

Scientific classification
- Kingdom: Animalia
- Phylum: Mollusca
- Class: Cephalopoda
- Order: Oegopsida
- Family: Enoploteuthidae
- Genus: Abraliopsis
- Subgenus: Pfefferiteuthis
- Species: A. affinis

Binomial name
- Abraliopsis affinis (Pfeffer, 1912)

Species of mollusc

Abraliopsis affinis is a species of enoploteuthid cephalopod in the tropical waters of the eastern Pacific Ocean, and is known from Chile, Colombia, Costa Rica, Ecuador, El Salvador, Guatemala, Honduras, Mexico, Nicaragua, Panama and Peru. It was described by Pfeffer in 1912 and is rated as a least-concern species by the IUCN.

== Description ==
Female specimens spawn eggs in gelatinous strings with diameters of 0.9 to 1.5 millimetres (0.035 to 0.059 in). Three of its arms have been observed on a specimen as having distal suckers and between fifteen and thirty hooks, and some arms have been observed with protective membranes. Each hectocotylus has two flaps of similar sizes. Ventral hooks are roughly two-and-a-half the length of dorsal hooks, and it has a large aboral keel and carpal flap. It has five ocular photophores and nine integumental photophores (six on the mantle and three on the ventral head).

== Distribution ==
A. affinis is found over a large oceanic area which means that it is less affected by the actions of humans. Figures of its population are unknown, as is its ecology, specific distribution, and threats. It is found in Costa Rica, Chile, Colombia, Ecuador, Guatemala, Honduras, El Salvador, Mexico, Panama, Peru, and Nicaragua; it occurs in the eastern central and southeastern Pacific Ocean. The International Union for the Conservation of Nature (IUCN) has rated its conservation status as a least-concern species due to its large range. There are no actions of conservation regarding the species. It is found at mid-depths below the surface and at night, it travels upwards for feeding.

== Taxonomy ==
Pfeffer described the species as Abralia affinis in 1912.
