= Abraliopsis chuni =

Conservation status
- Data Deficient (IUCN 3.1)

Scientific classification
- Domain: Eukaryota
- Kingdom: Animalia
- Phylum: Mollusca
- Class: Cephalopoda
- Order: Oegopsida
- Family: Enoploteuthidae
- Genus: Abraliopsis
- Subgenus: Pfefferiteuthis
- Species: A. chuni

Binomial name
- Abraliopsis chuni Nesis, 1982

Species of mollusc

Abraliopsis chuni is a species of enoploteuthid cephalopod known from Indo-Pacific waters. Very little is known of this species.
