= Nototeuthis =

Conservation status
- Data Deficient (IUCN 3.1)

Scientific classification
- Kingdom: Animalia
- Phylum: Mollusca
- Class: Cephalopoda
- Order: Oegopsida
- Family: Neoteuthidae
- Genus: Nototeuthis; Nesis & Nikitina, 1986
- Species: N. dimegacotyle

Binomial name
- Nototeuthis dimegacotyle Nesis & Nikitina, 1986

Genus of squids

Nototeuthis is a monotypic genus of squid, in the family Neoteuthidae. The only species in this genus is Nototeuthis dimegacotyle . This species is characterised by short tentacular clubs, less than 40% of the length of the mantle, and relatively long fins, which are approximately 60% of the mantle length. The tentacle clubs have two greatly enlarged suckers on distal portion of the manus, which distinguish N. dimegacotyle from other members of the Neoteuthidae. Few specimens of this species are currently known. Specimens have been collected from the south eastern Pacific Ocean, off Chile, between the Southern Subtropical and the Antarctic Polar frontal zones. This species is mesopelagic to bathypelagic and can be found from near the surface to a depth of ~500m.
