= Abraliopsis lineata =

Conservation status
- Least Concern (IUCN 3.1)

Scientific classification
- Domain: Eukaryota
- Kingdom: Animalia
- Phylum: Mollusca
- Class: Cephalopoda
- Order: Oegopsida
- Family: Enoploteuthidae
- Genus: Abraliopsis
- Subgenus: Micrabralia
- Species: A. lineata

Binomial name
- Abraliopsis lineata (Goodrich, 1896)

Species of mollusc

Abraliopsis lineata is a species of enoploteuthid cephalopod native to Indo-Pacific waters, from the Arabian Sea and the Mascarene Islands in the west to Japan, Indonesia and French Polynesia in the east. It occurs in relatively shallow water at depths of ~100 m during the day.
