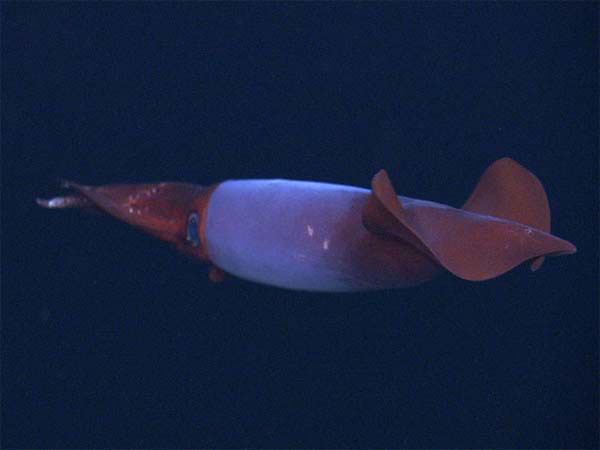

Conservation status
- Least Concern (IUCN 3.1)

Scientific classification
- Kingdom: Animalia
- Phylum: Mollusca
- Class: Cephalopoda
- Order: Oegopsida
- Family: Gonatidae
- Genus: Gonatus
- Species: G. fabricii

Binomial name
- Gonatus fabricii Lichtenstein, 1818

Synonyms
- Chiloteuthis rapax Verrill, 1881; Onychoteuthis amoena Møller (dk), 1842; Onychoteuthis fabricii Lichtenstein, 1818

= Gonatus fabricii =

Species of squid

Gonatus fabricii, the Boreo-atlantic armhook squid, is a squid in the family Gonatidae. It occurs in the northern Atlantic Ocean from Canada to the Barents Sea.

Until 1981, the name G. fabricii was usually misapplied to the very similar relative G. steenstrupi.

Gonatus fabricii grows to 30 cm in mantle length.

The type specimen was collected off Greenland and is deposited at the Zoologisk Museum of Kobenhavns Universitet in Copenhagen.
