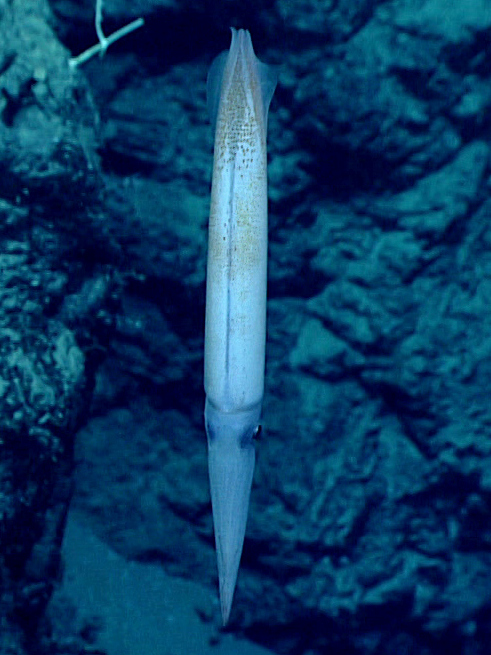

Conservation status
- Data Deficient (IUCN 3.1)

Scientific classification
- Kingdom: Animalia
- Phylum: Mollusca
- Class: Cephalopoda
- Order: Oegopsida
- Family: Neoteuthidae
- Genus: Narrowteuthis; Young & Vecchione, 2005
- Species: N. nesisi

Binomial name
- Narrowteuthis nesisi Young & Vecchione, 2005

= Narrowteuthis =

Genus of squids

Narrowteuthis is a monotypic genus of squid, the sole member is Narrowteuthis nesisi, from the family Neoteuthidae. It is known from just two specimens caught off the Canary Islands at 27°18'N, 19°44'W.
