= Abraliopsis falco =

Conservation status
- Least Concern (IUCN 3.1)

Scientific classification
- Kingdom: Animalia
- Phylum: Mollusca
- Class: Cephalopoda
- Order: Oegopsida
- Family: Enoploteuthidae
- Genus: Abraliopsis
- Subgenus: Pfefferiteuthis
- Species: A. falco

Binomial name
- Abraliopsis falco (Young, 1972)

Species of mollusc

Abraliopsis falco is a species of enoploteuthid cephalopod found in the tropical waters of the East Pacific Ocean, and is known from Chile, Colombia, Costa Rica, Ecuador, El Salvador, Guatemala, México, Nicaragua, Panamá, Perú and the United States. Females are larger than males, reaching sizes of 41–46 mm mantle length, with males reaching 35–37 mm mantle length.
