= Aquatic photosynthesis =

Photosynthesis in aquatic ecosystems

Aquatic photosynthesis is the occurrence of photosynthesis in the aquatic environment, which includes the freshwater environment and the marine (saltwater) environment. Organisms that perform photosynthesis in the aquatic environment include plants, algae, cyanobacteria, coral, phytoplankton (also known as micro algae).

Half of the photosynthesis on Earth is occurring in the oceans.

== Obstacles to aquatic photosynthesis ==
The biggest obstacle to photosynthesis in the aquatic setting is that light is needed for photosynthesis, and water itself will absorb light. By the time light reaches 10 meters deep, about half or more of the light has already been absorbed by the water. Very little light reaches any deeper than 200 meters, and thus the top 200 meters of the oceans is called the "euphotic zone" or the "sunlight zone". The addition of any debris in the water or clouds in the sky will greatly reduce the penetration of light in the water.
