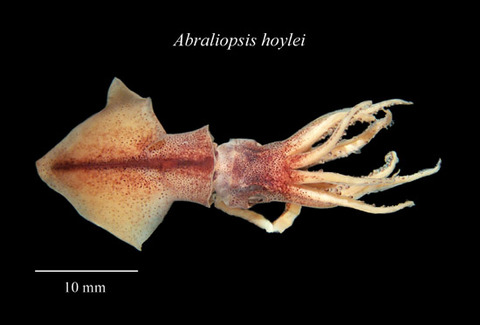

Conservation status
- Data Deficient (IUCN 3.1)

Scientific classification
- Kingdom: Animalia
- Phylum: Mollusca
- Class: Cephalopoda
- Order: Oegopsida
- Family: Enoploteuthidae
- Genus: Abraliopsis
- Subgenus: Abraliopsis
- Species: A. hoylei

Binomial name
- Abraliopsis hoylei (Pfeffer, 1884)

Synonyms
- Enoploteuthis hoylei Pfeffer, 1884

= Abraliopsis hoylei =

Species of mollusc

Abraliopsis hoylei is a species of enoploteuthid cephalopod whose type locality is the Mascarene Islands, but this is uncertain, and the type specimen has been damaged, making taxonomic determination difficult.
