= Gonatopsis okutanii =

Conservation status
- Data Deficient (IUCN 3.1)

Scientific classification
- Kingdom: Animalia
- Phylum: Mollusca
- Class: Cephalopoda
- Order: Oegopsida
- Family: Gonatidae
- Genus: Gonatopsis
- Species: G. okutanii

Binomial name
- Gonatopsis okutanii Nesis, 1972

Synonyms
- Eogonatus tinro (Nesis, 1972); Gonatus tinro (Nesis, 1972)

Species of squid

Gonatopsis okutanii is a species of squid from the family Gonatidae from the northern Pacific Ocean. It is of uncertain taxonomic status, the presence of remnant tentacles on spent females indicate that this species does not belong in the genus Gonatopsis and the differences between this species and Gonatus makodai have led to some authorities stating that G. okutanii is a junior synonym of Eogonatus tinro. However the World Register of Marine Species still recognises Gonatopsis okutanii as the valid name for this taxon.

== Description ==
Gonatopsis okutanii is a medium-sized species of squid with a gelatinous body, 5 teeth on the radula and long, thin arms. Arms II & III are very long and slender; and their length is at least equal to the mantle length. The arms have thick bases but become weak and narrow towards their tips. Arms I-III have 2 rows of hooks in the middle and 2 rows of small suckers while arm IV only has suckers. All the arms have 5-10 pairs of medial hooks or suckers which are spaced wide apart, the arm suckers have 7-9 teeth placed on the distal edge of their ring. All known specimens are spent females which have short, remnants of tentacles situated between the proximal ends of arms III and IV. They have very large eyes, a buccal membrane which has 7 lappets and there is in nuchal crest which has three or four indistinct nuchal folds on either side along its length. The radula has teeth in five transverse rows. The mantle is thick, soft, gelatinous and conical in shape with a mantle length which varies between 18 cm and 25 cm. The skin is dark purple in colour marked with "eye patches". It has short rhomboid shaped, narrow fins and a short tail.

Tentacles are present on the subadult specimens described as Eogonatus tinro and these have a tentacular club lacking any hooks and with equal sized suckers arranged in numerous irregular rows.

== Distribution ==
Gonatopsis okutanii occurs in the North Pacific Ocean from Japan in the east to Alaska and Canada in the west.

== Habitat and biology ==
Gonatopsis okutanii is reported to have relatively large eggs up to 2.3 mm in length, compared to female body size. The male and female appear to copulate "head to head", and the adult females do not appear to die after their first breeding. They are caught at intermediate depths and spent females have been collected at depths of between 525m and 550 m and have been found in the stomachs of sperm whales.

== Naming ==
Some authorities treat Gonatopsis okutanii as a junior synonym of Eogonatus tinro and the two taxa were described in the same paper by Kir Nesis, G. okutanii was based on spent females, while E. tinro was based on young squid, however E. tinro has priority.
