= Gonatus pyros =

Conservation status
- Least Concern (IUCN 3.1)

Scientific classification
- Kingdom: Animalia
- Phylum: Mollusca
- Class: Cephalopoda
- Order: Oegopsida
- Family: Gonatidae
- Genus: Gonatus
- Species: G. pyros

Binomial name
- Gonatus pyros R. E. Young, 1972

Species of squid

Gonatus pyros, the fiery gonate squid, or fiery armhook squid, is a species of squid within the family Gonatidae. The distribution of the species is in the central and eastern North Pacific from the Aleutian Islands to Baja California, where it lives at depths of 563–667 m (1,850–2,190 ft) in oceanic environments. Their planktonic paralarvae are usually found at depths of 200–300 m (660–980 ft). High abundances occur over continental slopes in the summer. It grows to lengths of 125 mm (4.9 in).

Gonatus pyros currently has no conservation measures towards it, and more research is required to fully understand its distribution, population, and potential threats that may effect the species. For now it has been assessed as 'Least concern' by the IUCN Red List.
