= Kir Nesis =

Russian marine biologist and malacologist

Kir Nazimovich Nesis (9 January 1934 – 8 January 2003) was a Russian marine biologist and malacologist, specialising in cephalopods.

== Early life and education ==
Nesis was born in Moscow on 9 January 1934 to an intellectual family, his father was an architect and his mother was an economic geographer. His father was arrested by the Soviet state in 1938 and executed. This would cause some difficulty for Nesis as he was the son of a person who had been executed as an enemy of the state. He initially wanted to study astronomy and he won an All-Union Competition in astronomy for schoolchildren but this career was not open to the son of an "enemy of the nation". He decided instead to become a marine biologist and in 1951 he enrolled in a course at the Moscow Technical Institute for Fisheries and Fishery Management in the Department of Hydrobiology, as this was not among the top ranked Soviet institutions his father's status did not bar him from entry.

== Career ==
After graduation Nesis was secured an appointment as a junior researcher at the Laboratory of Marine Biology in the Polar Research Institute of Marine Fisheries and Oceanography in Murmansk. His first spell at the laboratory lasted from 1956 to 1960 and he returned from 1963-1966. He eventually became the chief of the laboratory and carried out research on the benthic fauna of the North Atlantic and Arctic oceans, especially the taxonomy and ecology of various groups of these animals. Between these two periods in Murmansk Nesis enrolled at the Zoological Institute of the USSR Academy of Sciences in Leningrad. Here he completed his Ph.D. and his thesis was called The Bottom Fauna of Commercial Fishery Areas of the North Atlantic and the Atlantic sector of the Arctic as an Indicator of Productivity and Water Regime.

In 1966 he returned to Moscow, where he briefly held a position with the Scientific Council on Hydrobiology and Ichthyology before moving to the P.P. Shirshov Institute of Oceanology of the USSR Academy of Sciences. Nesis worked here for the rest of his life in the Department of Nekton first as the senior scientist, then as the principal scientist and finally as the leading scientist. From the mid-1960s, the main focus of his research was on the taxonomy, zoogeography, ecology and evolution of cephalopods. In 1986, he was awarded a Doctor of Science degree for his book Oceanic Cephalopods: Distribution, Ecology, and Evolution.

Nesis had come to be regarded as one of the world's foremost cephalopod workers by the mid-1970s, and he was very prolific, publishing around 460 scientific and popular publications and reviews; these included 6 books and 225 scientific papers on benthic ecology, cephalopod biology, marine zoogeography, ecology and evolutionary theory. He was the author of 43 papers about the ecology of bottom fauna. From this body of work some 274 publications, including all six of his books, 142 scientific papers and 45 popular science articles, were about cephalopods. He described 29 new cephalopod taxa, which included one new family. Nesis was also a productive free-lance author, writing circa 125 popular articles on biology for Soviet and Russian popular scientific publications. As well as that, he was the leading writer of biology abstracts for the Soviet/Russian Abstracts magazine of the Institute of Scientific Information writing at least 30,500 abstracts, averaging 70 a month. He also was editor-in-chief of Ruthenica, the Russian malacological journal that he helped found and he sat on the editorial boards of several other scientific journals.

He was also an enthusiastic field biologist and he participated in over 30 research expeditions, both close to home in Russian waters and further afield in oceans around the world. Nearly 10 years of his life was spent at sea on expeditions, during which he collected and studied cephalopods and other animals as well as formulating new ideas. After each expedition he wrote an important contribution which advanced basic knowledge on the biology, taxonomy and faunal diversity of cephalopods of area studied during that voyage. The immense personal knowledge, his study of the many specimens collected on expeditions from around the world, and an extensive database of cephalopod literature enabled Nesis to write the world's first identification guide to the cephalopods. This book was first published in Russian in 1982 and was subsequently translated into English in 1987, was one of his principal accomplishments. He also authored a field guide to cephalopod larvae that covered 182 species. He was able to put his accumulated knowledge and experience into “Oceanic Cephalopods: Distribution, Life Forms and Evolution” which was published in 1985. This work in conjunction with his identification guides are still some of the main reference sources on the biology and identification of cephalopods.

He died suddenly in Moscow on 8 January 2003 on his way home from work. He was married to Tatiana Semenova, with whom he had a daughter, Anna.

== Species named after Kir Nesis ==
The following species have been named in honor of Kir Nesis.

- Amigdoscalpellum nesisi (Zevina, 1972)
- Asperoteuthis nesisi Arkhipkin & Laptikhovsky, 2008
- Cholidyella nesisi Avdeev, 1986
- Heterocarpus nesisi Burukovsky, 1986
- Kirnasia nesisi Burukovsky, 1988
- Scaeurgus nesisi Norman, Hochberg & Boucher-Rodoni, 2005

== Species named by Kir Nesis ==
Nesis described some 29 cephalopod species including the following.

- Gonatopsis okutanii Nesis, 1972
- Neorossia caroli jeannae Nesis et al., 2001
- Nototeuthis dimegacotyle Nesis & Nikitina, 1986
- Walvisteuthis virilis Nesis & Nikitina, 1986
