= HMCS Cobalt =

Royal Canadian Navy ship that served during the Second World War

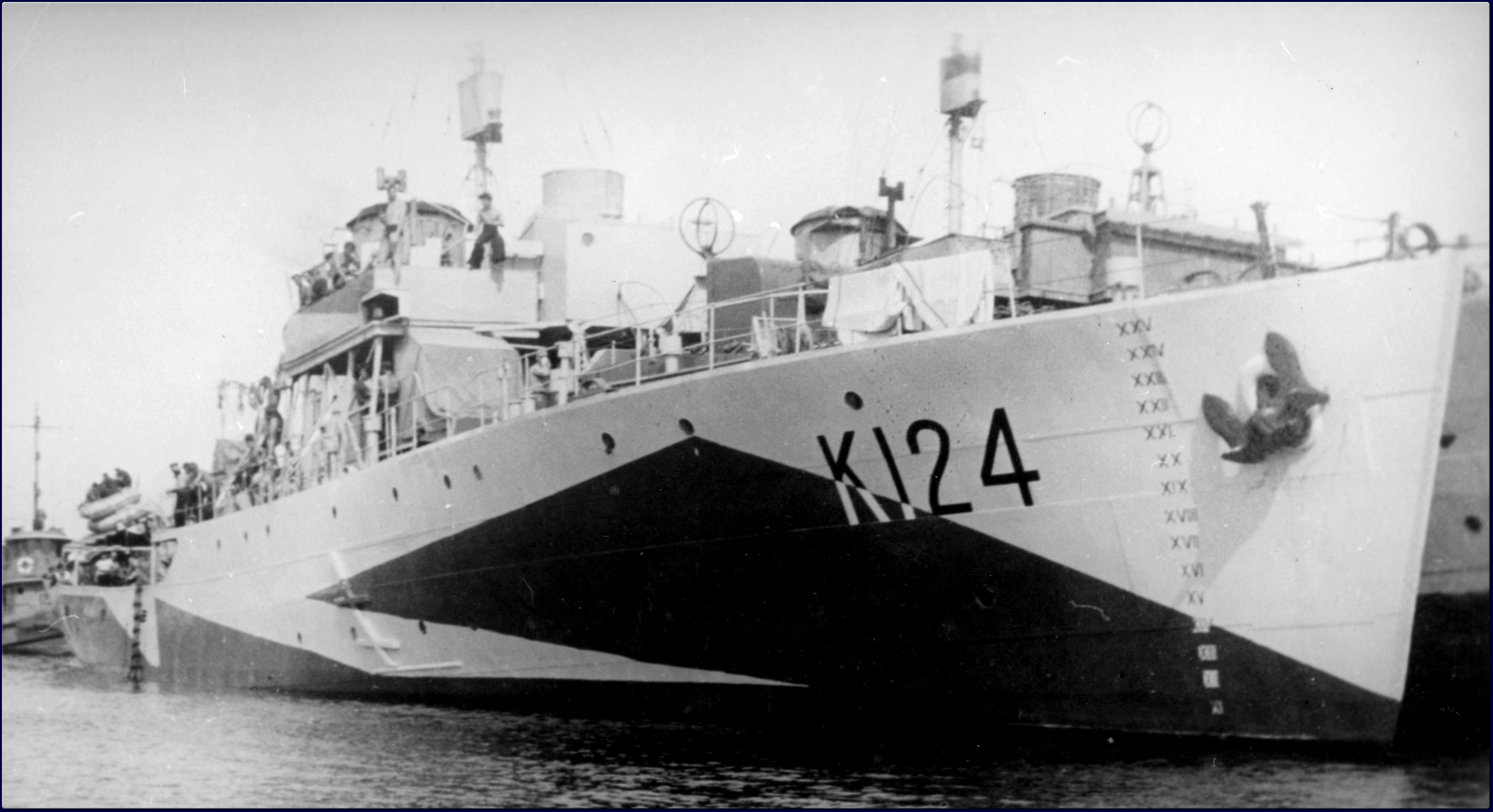
- HMCS Cobalt at Liverpool, Nova Scotia, where she underwent her foc'sle extension refit in 1944.

History

Canada
- Name: Cobalt
- Namesake: Cobalt, Ontario
- Ordered: 1 February 1940
- Builder: Port Arthur Shipbuilding Co. Port Arthur
- Laid down: 1 April 1940
- Launched: 17 August 1940
- Commissioned: 25 November 1940
- Decommissioned: 17 June 1945
- Identification: Pennant number: K124
- Honours and awards: Atlantic, 1941 – 45.
- Fate: Sold for mercantile purposes; broken up 1966

General characteristics
- Class & type: Flower-class corvette (original)
- Displacement: 925 long tons (940 t; 1,036 short tons)
- Length: 205 ft (62.48 m)o/a
- Beam: 33 ft (10.06 m)
- Draught: 11.5 ft (3.51 m)
- Propulsion: single shaft; 2 × fire tube Scotch boilers; 1 × 4-cycle triple-expansion reciprocating steam engine; 2,750 ihp (2,050 kW)
- Speed: 16 knots (29.6 km/h)
- Range: 3,500 nautical miles (6,482 km) at 12 knots (22.2 km/h)
- Complement: 85
- Sensors & processing systems: 1 × SW1C or 2C radar; 1 × Type 123A or Type 127DV sonar
- Armament: 1 × BL 4 in (102 mm) Mk.IX gun; 2 × .50 cal machine gun (twin); 2 × Lewis .303 cal machine gun (twin); 2 × Mk.II depth charge throwers; 2 × depth charge rails with 40 depth charges

HMCS Cobalt was a Flower-class corvette of the Royal Canadian Navy which took part in convoy escort duties during the Second World War. She served primarily in the Battle of the Atlantic. She was named for Cobalt, Ontario.

== Background ==
Flower-class corvettes like Cobalt serving with the Royal Canadian Navy during the Second World War were different from earlier and more traditional sail-driven corvettes. The "corvette" designation was created by the French as a class of small warships; the Royal Navy borrowed the term for a period but discontinued its use in 1877. During the hurried preparations for war in the late 1930s, Winston Churchill reactivated the corvette class, needing a name for smaller ships used in an escort capacity, in this case based on a whaling ship design. The generic name "flower" was used to designate the class of these ships, which – in the Royal Navy – were named after flowering plants.

Corvettes commissioned by the Royal Canadian Navy during the Second World War were named after communities for the most part, to better represent the people who took part in building them. This idea was put forth by Admiral Percy W. Nelles. Sponsors were commonly associated with the community for which the ship was named. Royal Navy corvettes were designed as open sea escorts, while Canadian corvettes were developed for coastal auxiliary roles which was exemplified by their minesweeping gear. Eventually the Canadian corvettes would be modified to allow them to perform better on the open seas.

== Construction ==
Cobalt was ordered 1 February 1940 as part of the 1939–1940 Flower-class shipbuilding program from Port Arthur Shipbuilding Co. in Port Arthur, Ontario. She was laid down on 1 April 1940 and launched 17 August later that year. Cobalt was commissioned at Port Arthur on 25 November 1940, however Cobalt was taken to Halifax in advance of completion to beat the St. Lawrence freeze-up, arriving 24 December. In mid-November Cobalt was sent to Liverpool, Nova Scotia for three months' refit. During the second of two other extensive refits at Liverpool from April to 20 July 1944 her fo'c'sle was lengthened.

== Wartime service ==
Cobalt was completed early in January 1941. On 22 January 1941 she took part in the Canadian Navy's first secret trial of diffused lighting camouflage, a technology for concealing ships from submarines at night.

She worked up and joined Halifax Force, but left on 23 May 1941 with the six other corvettes that were the nucleus of the new Newfoundland Escort Force (NEF). For the next six months she operated as an ocean escort between St. John's and Iceland.

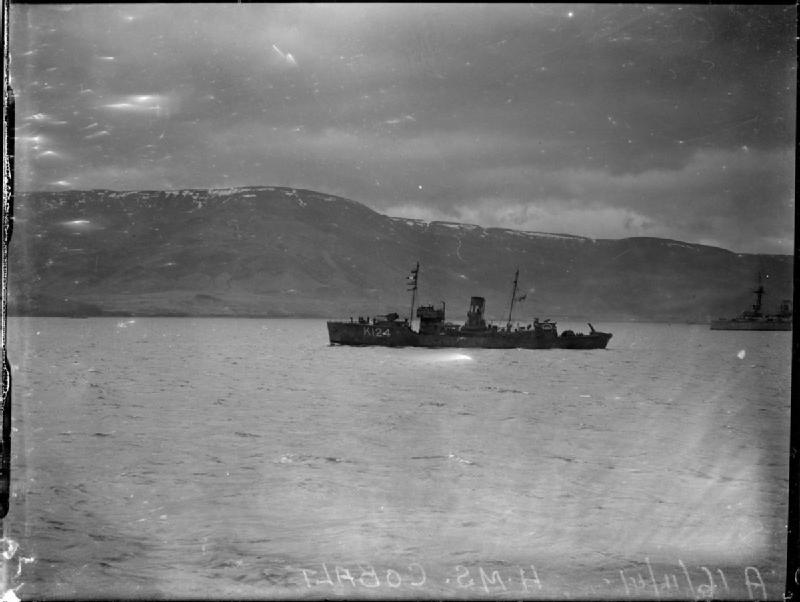
HMCS Cobalt leaving Iceland

Following completion of her first refit, Cobalt made two round trips to Derry before being assigned in May 1942 to the Western Local Escort Force (WLEF), with which she was to spend the balance of the war. During her time with WLEF she served with escort groups EG W-6 from June 1943; with W-5 from April 1944; and with W-7 from February 1945. She finished the war with group W-7.

== Post-war service ==
Cobalt was paid off at Sorel, Quebec on 17 June 1945 and subsequently sold for conversion to a whale-catcher, entering service in 1953 as the Dutch Johanna W. Vinke. On 31 December 1961 she suffered a boiler explosion while whaling, and was declared a constructive total loss. She was broken up at Cape Town beginning on 6 June 1963 by South African Metal & Machinery Pty Ltd.
