= Diffused lighting camouflage =

Active camouflage system for Second World War ships

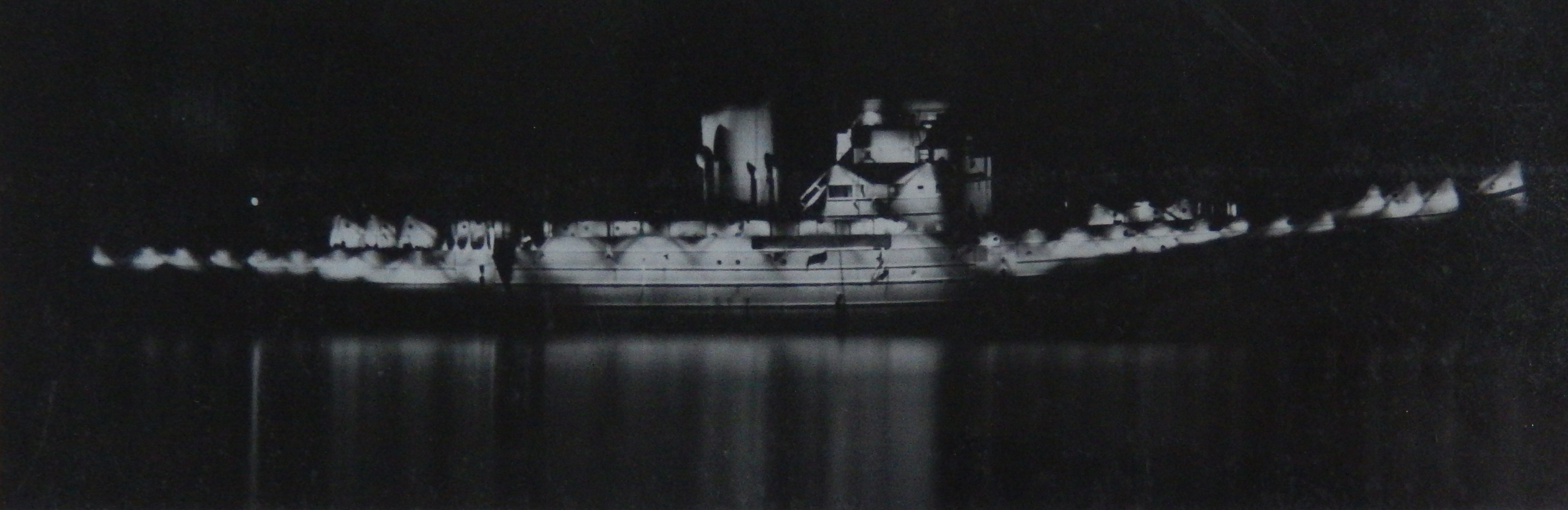
- HMS Largs by night with incomplete diffused lighting set to maximum brightness, 1942
- Keywords: Active camouflage Counter-illumination
- Project type: Military research
- Funding agency: Royal Canadian Navy
- Objective: Make brightness of ships match their backgrounds
- Duration: 1941 – 1943

Diffused lighting camouflage was a form of active camouflage using counter-illumination to enable a ship to match its background, the night sky, that was tested by the Royal Canadian Navy on corvettes during World War II. The principle was discovered by a Canadian professor, Edmund Godfrey Burr, in 1940. It attracted interest because it could help to hide ships from submarines in the Battle of the Atlantic, and the research project began early in 1941. The Royal Navy and the US Navy carried out further equipment development and trials between 1941 and 1943.

The concept behind diffused lighting camouflage was to project light on to the sides of a ship, to make its brightness match its background. Projectors were mounted on temporary supports attached to the hull and the prototype was developed to include automatic control of brightness using a photocell. The concept was never put into production, though the Canadian prototypes did briefly see service. The Canadian ideas were adapted by the US Air Force in its Yehudi lights project.

== Concept ==
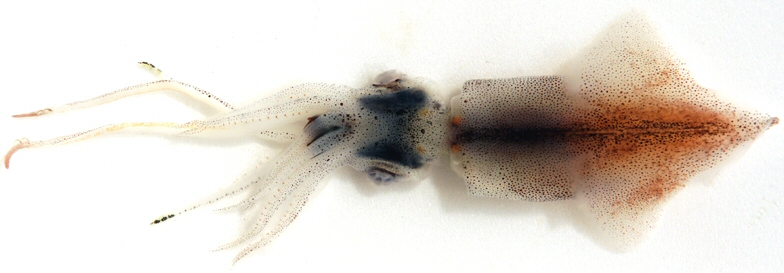
The firefly squid uses bioluminescence to counter-illuminate its underside to match the brighter sea surface above.

Diffused lighting camouflage was explored by the Royal Canadian Navy (RCN) and tested at sea on corvettes during World War II, and later in the armed forces of the UK and the US.

An equivalent strategy, known to zoologists as counter-illumination, is used by many marine organisms, notably cephalopods including the midwater squid, Abralia veranyi. The underside is covered with small photophores, organs that produce light. The squid varies the intensity of the light according to the brightness of the sea surface far above, providing effective camouflage by lighting out the animal's shadow.

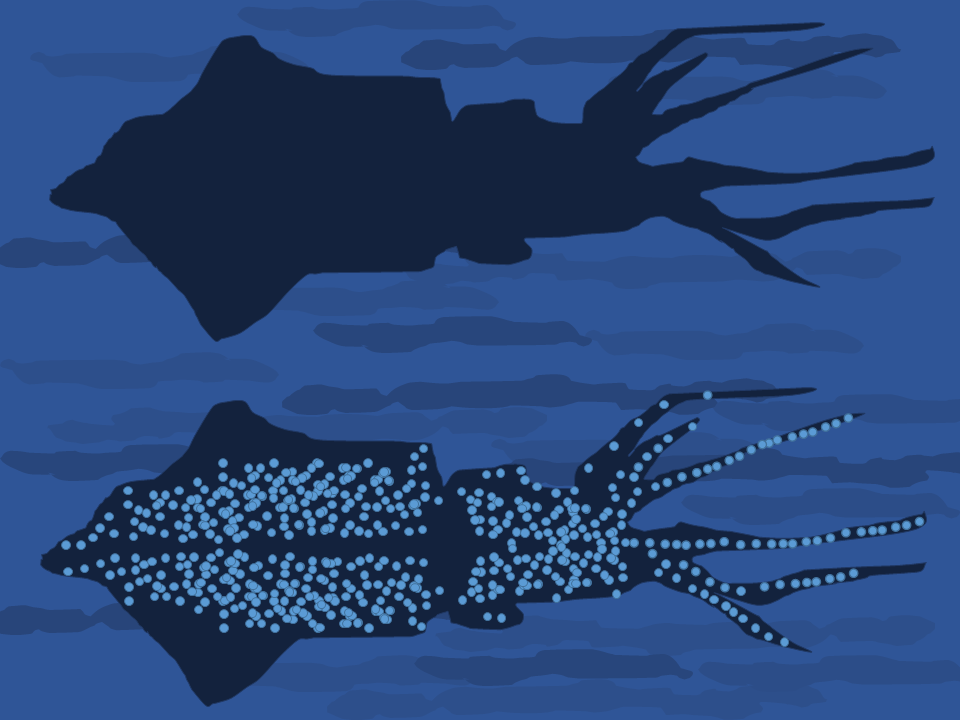
The principle of counter-illumination camouflage in squid. When seen from below by a predator, the animal's light helps to match its brightness and colour to the sea surface.

In 1940, Edmund Godfrey Burr, a Canadian professor at McGill University, serendipitously stumbled on the principle of counter-illumination, or as he called it "diffused-lighting camouflage". Burr had been tasked by Canada's National Research Council (NRC) to evaluate night observation instruments. With these, he found that aircraft flying without navigation lights remained readily visible as silhouettes against the night sky, which was never completely black.

Burr wondered if he could camouflage planes by somehow reducing this difference in brightness. One night in December 1940, Burr saw a plane coming in to land over snow suddenly vanish: light reflected from the snow had illuminated the underside of the plane just enough to cancel out the difference in brightness, camouflaging the plane perfectly.

Burr informed the NRC, who told the RCN. They realized that the technique could help to hide ships from German submarines in the Battle of the Atlantic. Before the introduction of centimetre radar, submarines with their small profile could see convoy ships before they were themselves seen. Diffused lighting camouflage might, the RCN believed, redress the balance.

== Prototyping ==
=== Royal Canadian Navy ===
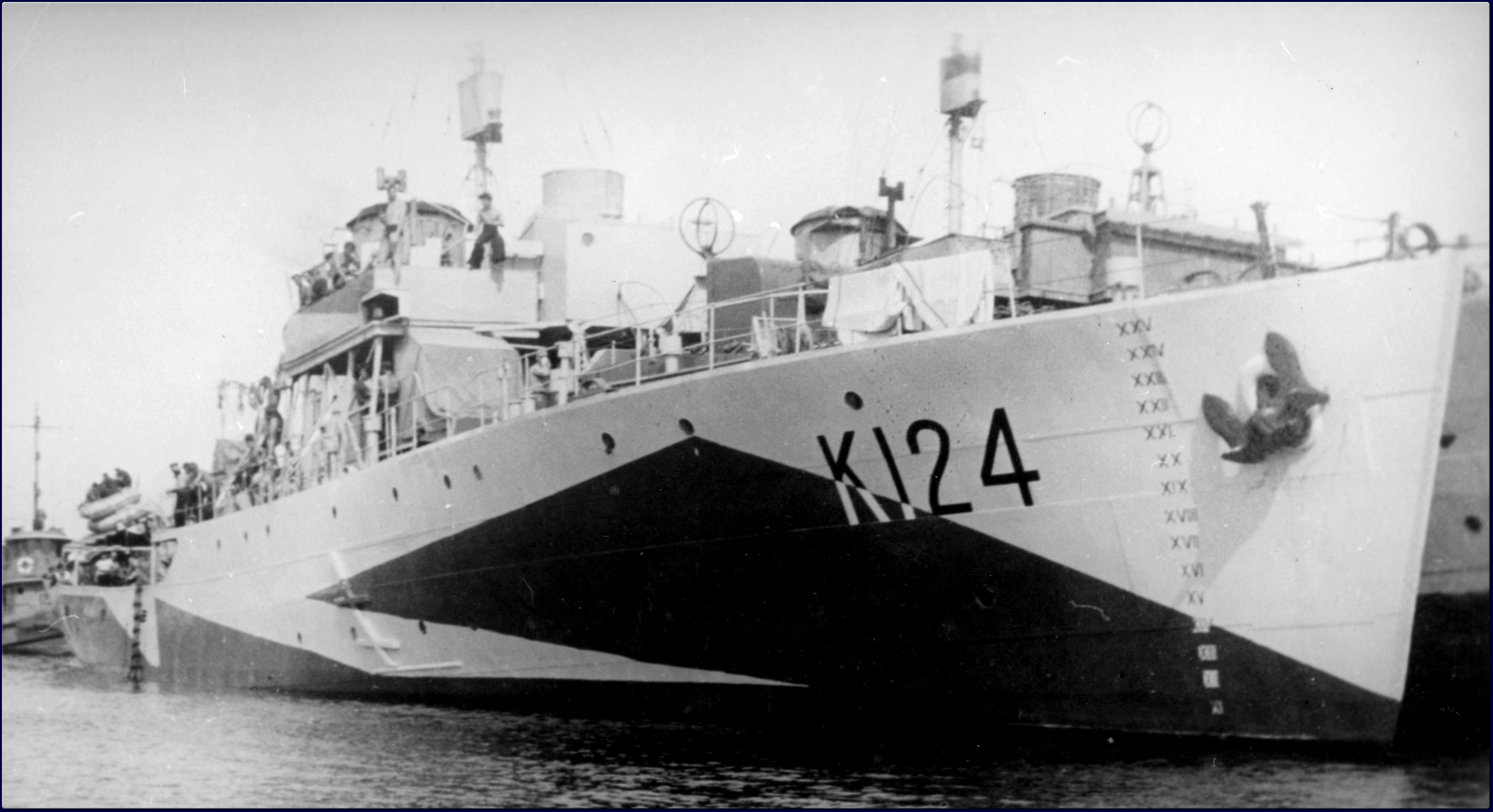
HMCS Cobalt began the secret sea trials of diffused lighting camouflage in January 1941.

Burr was quickly called to Canada's Naval Services Headquarters to discuss how to apply diffused lighting camouflage. Simple tests in the laboratory served as proof of concept. In January 1941, sea trials began on the new corvette HMCS Cobalt. She was fitted with ordinary light projectors—neither designed for robustness, nor waterproofed—on temporary supports on one side of the hull; brightness was controlled manually. The trial was sufficiently promising for a better prototype to be developed.

The second version, with blue-green filters over the projectors, was trialled on board the corvette HMCS Chambly in May 1941. This gave better results as the filters removed the reddish bias to the lamps when at low intensity (lower colour temperature). The supports too were retractable, so the delicate projectors could be stowed away for protection when not in use. This second version reduced Chambly's visibility by 50% in most conditions, and sometimes by as much as 75%. This was enough to justify development of a more robust version.

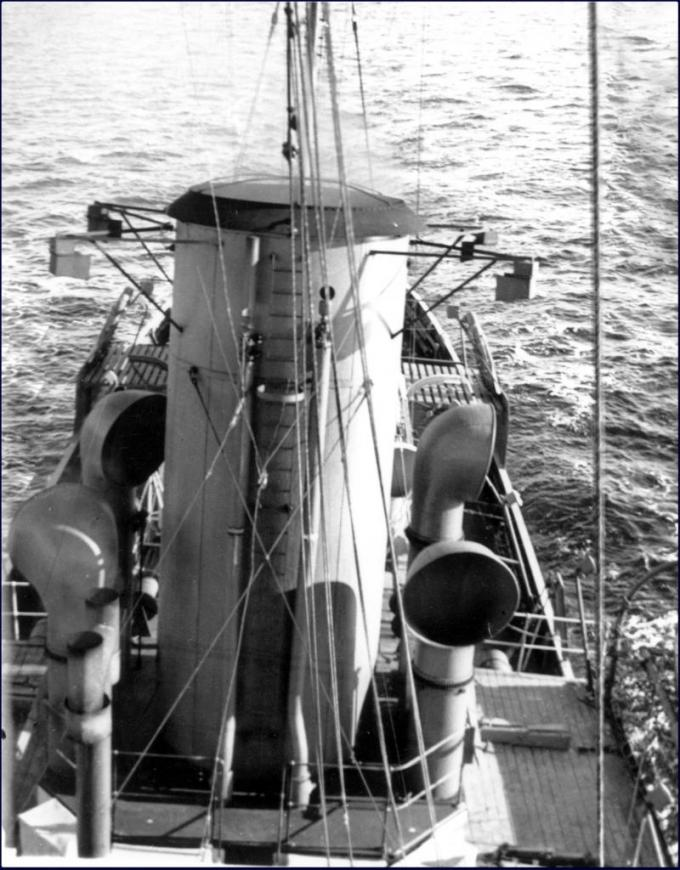
HMCS Kamloops with diffused lighting camouflage fittings on struts around the funnel, September 1941

The third version featured a photocell to measure the brightness of the night sky and the ship's side; the projectors' brightness was automatically controlled to balance out the difference. It was tested in September 1941 on the corvette HMCS Kamloops.

=== Royal Navy ===
Parallel trials of the Canadian diffused lighting equipment were carried out in March 1941 by the Royal Navy on the corvette HMS Trillium in the Clyde approaches. The Admiralty report on the Trillium trials stated that "Under certain weather conditions, the Canadian trials, in spite of the crude equipment used, gave highly satisfactory results. The experience gained during the present trials indicated that in various other types of weather this same equipment gave a much less conclusive indication of its value", and described the technical difficulties that any future version would face. The Admiralty informed the prime minister, Winston Churchill, at the end of that month, stating that the "results seem quite promising". Churchill replied the next day, suggesting that "Surely all this business should be pressed forward on a broader front than the one ship?" Accordingly, in April 1941 the Admiralty ordered further development work for "full scale trials".

The British General Electric Company developed a manually operated diffused lighting system, which was trialled on the ocean boarding vessel HMS Largs and the light cruiser HMS Penelope. The Largs surface observation trials were conducted between 25 January and 6 February 1942; air observation trials, using Hudson bombers, took place on the nights of 4/5 February and 25/26 March 1942. They found an average reduction in the range at which the ship could be seen at night from another ship of around 25% using binoculars, 33% using the naked eye. The results from the air were less conclusive.

The best case was on the exceptionally clear moonless night of 29/30 January 1942, when Largs could be seen from a surface ship with the naked eye at 5,250 yards (4,800 m) unlighted, but only 2,250 yards (2,060 m) with her diffused lighting, a 57% reduction. By June 1942, Royal Navy commanders considered that camouflage was largely unnecessary, given that the enemy would be using RDF and submarine hydrophones. In April 1943, the Admiralty decided that diffused lighting was impractical, and development was halted, though discussions continued with the Canadian Navy.

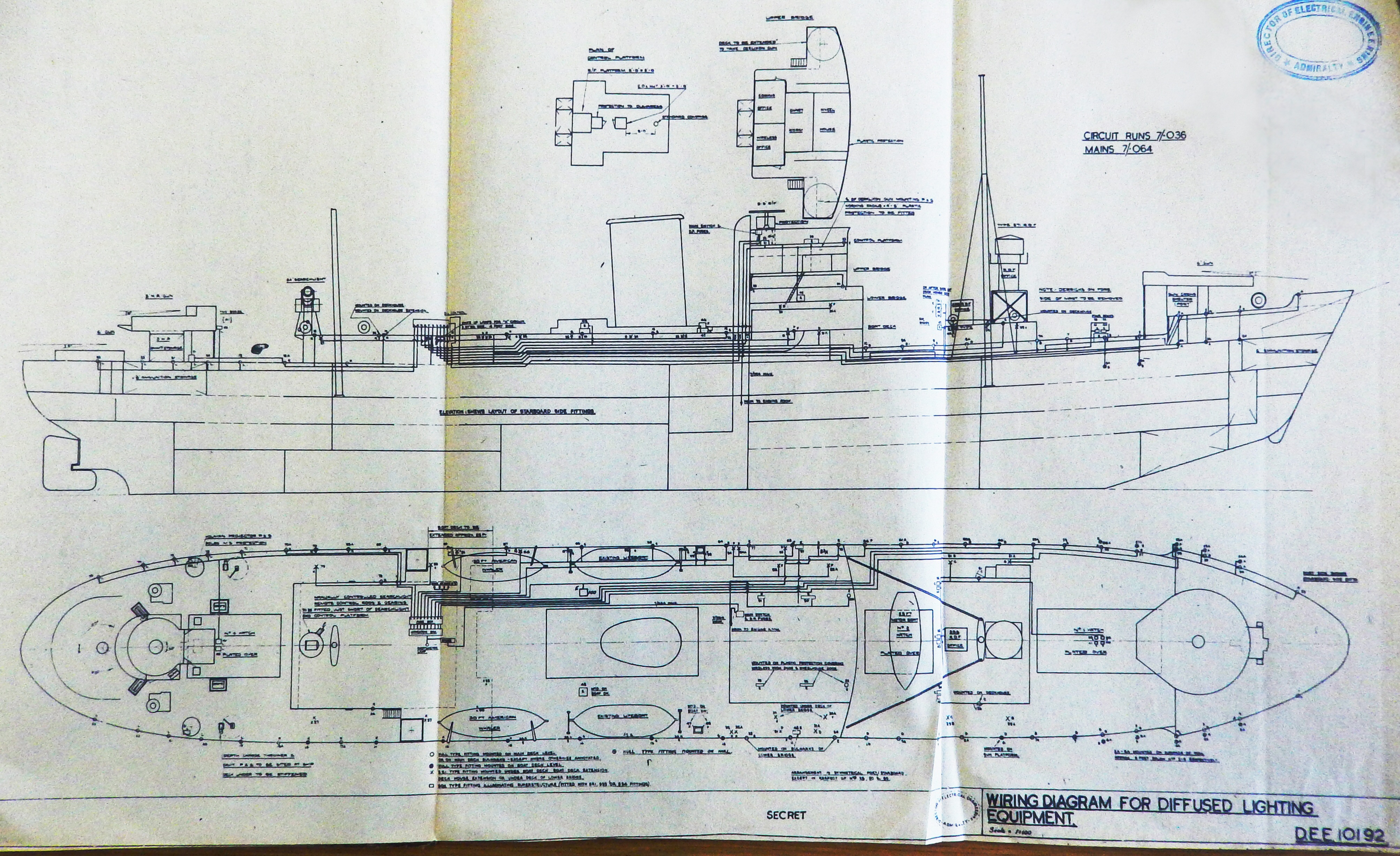
Layout of diffused lighting on HMS Largs showing fittings all around hull

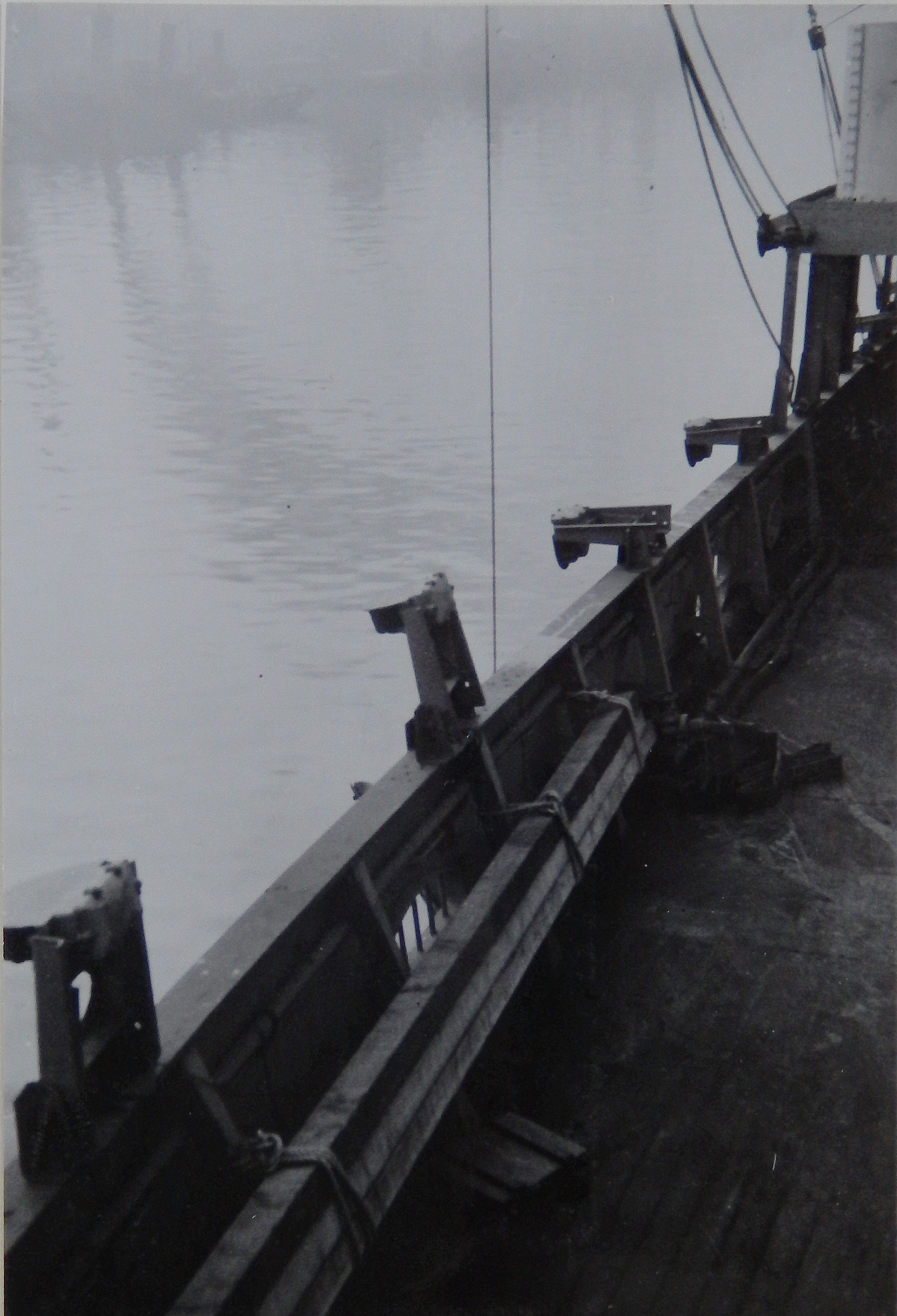
Bulwark of HMS Largs with 4 fittings, 2 lifted, 2 deployed

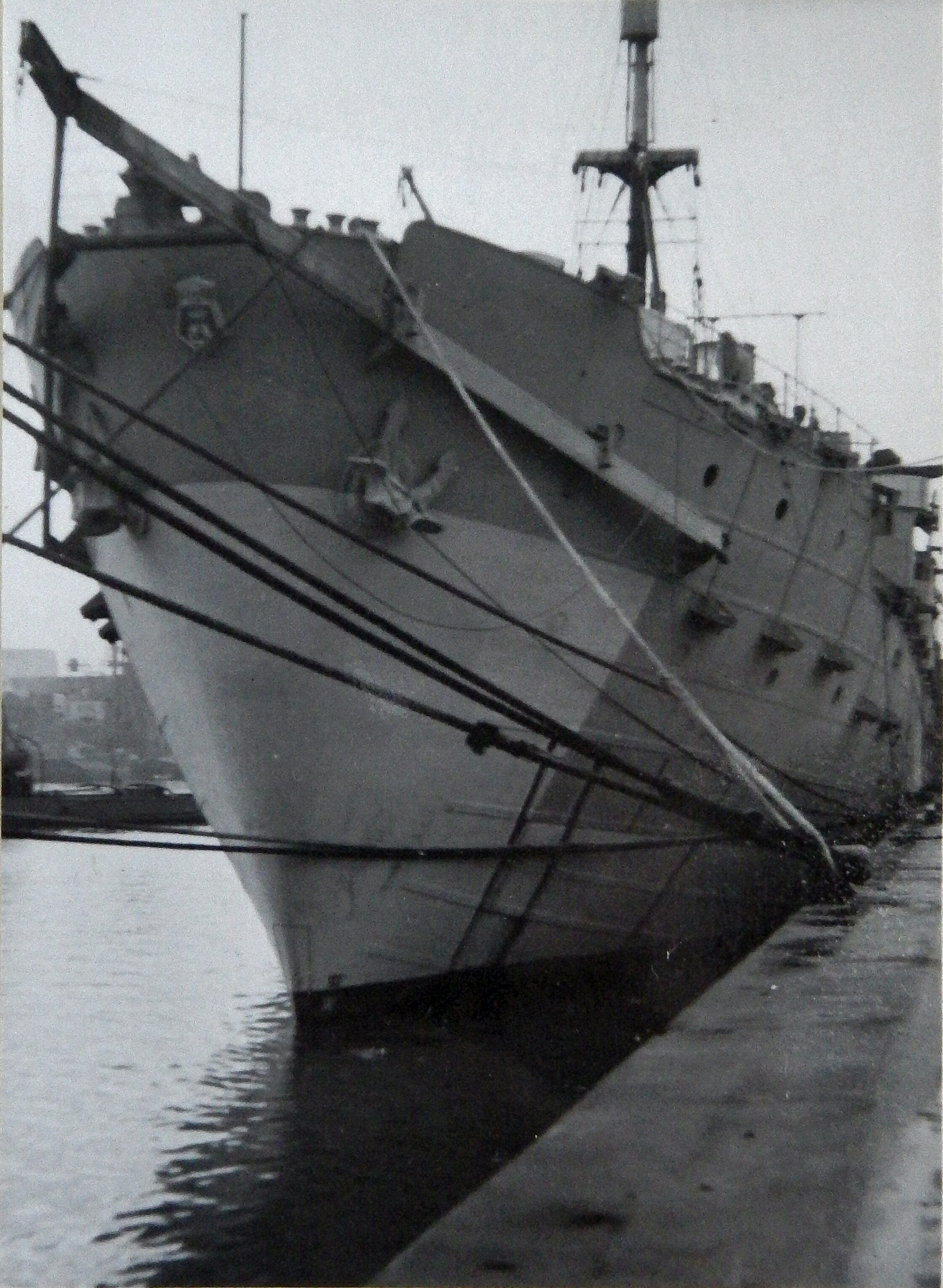
Bows of HMS Largs, 2 rows of fittings on hull (at top edge and along middle)

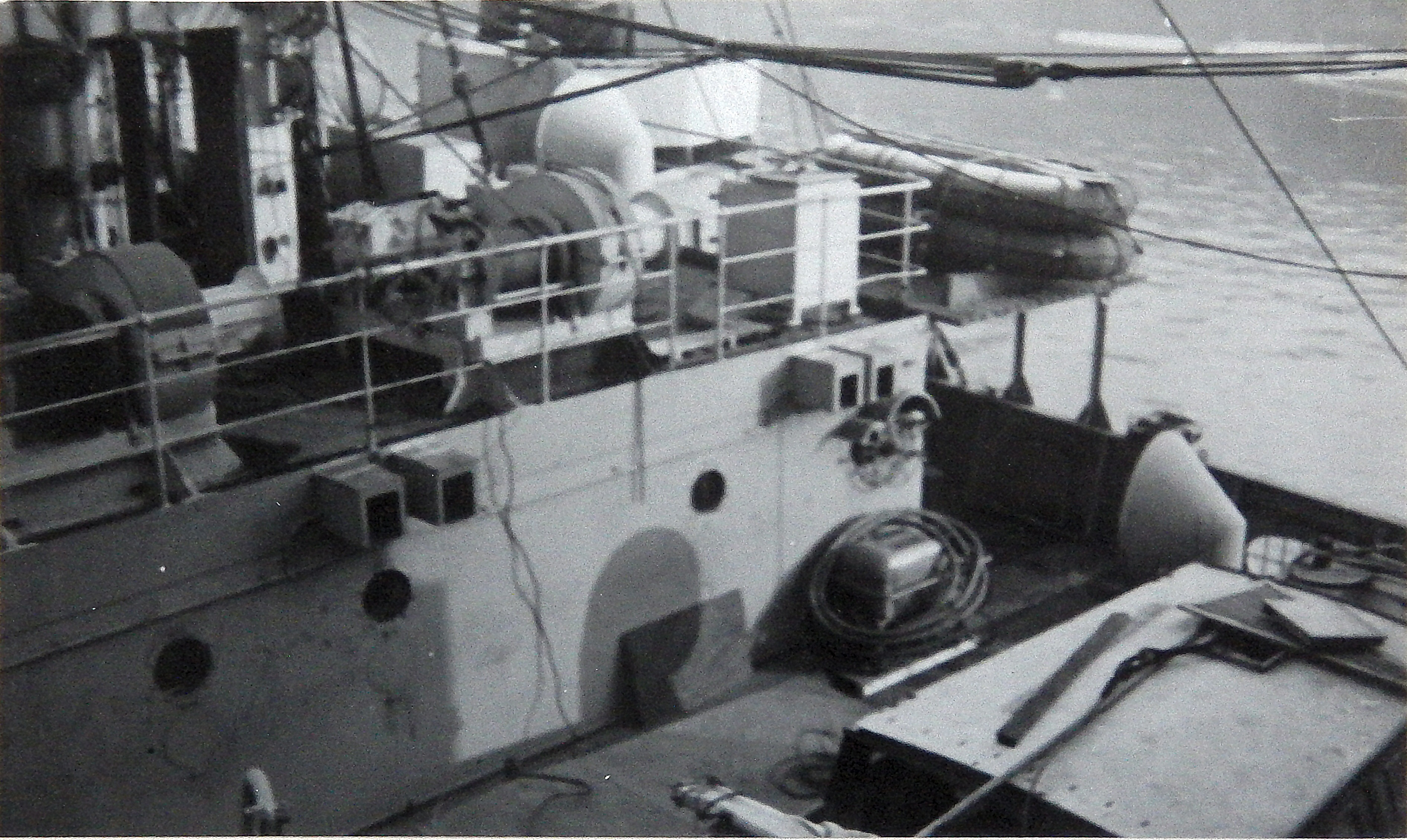
Diffused lighting type 3 fittings on HMS Largs forward bridge

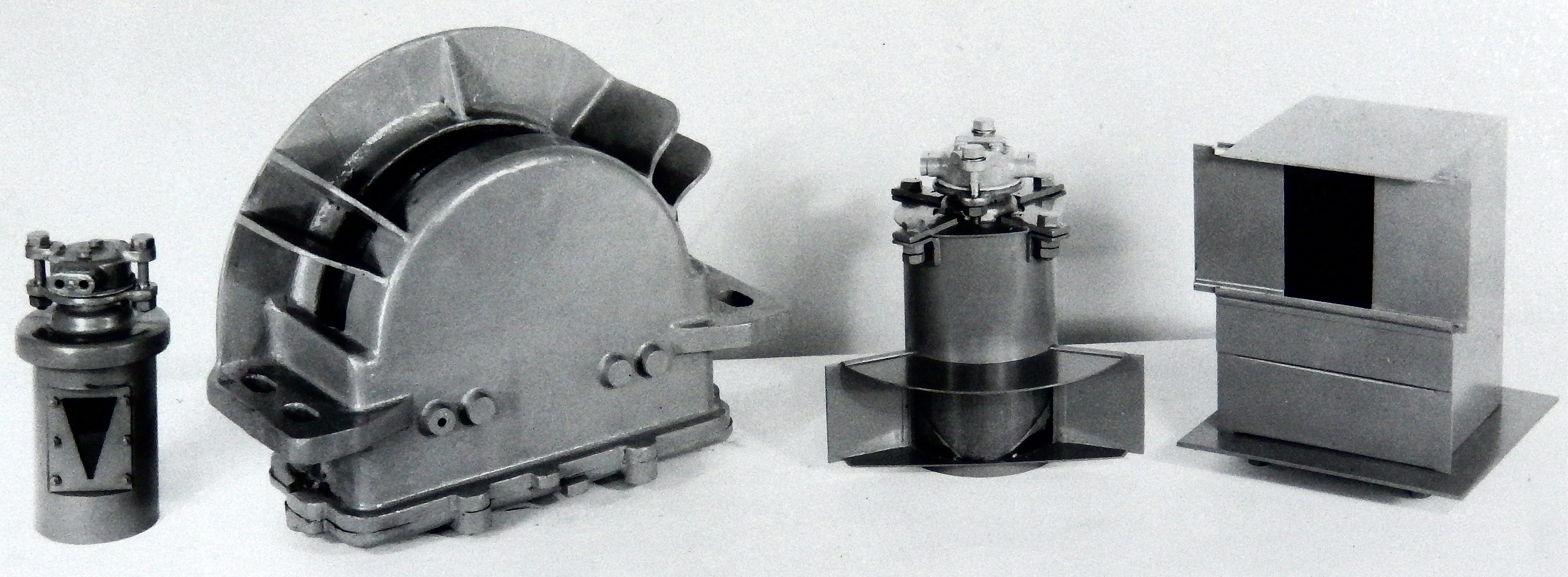
General Electric Company's diffused lighting fittings for HMS Largs: (from left to right) Type 3, Hull, Type 1, Type 2

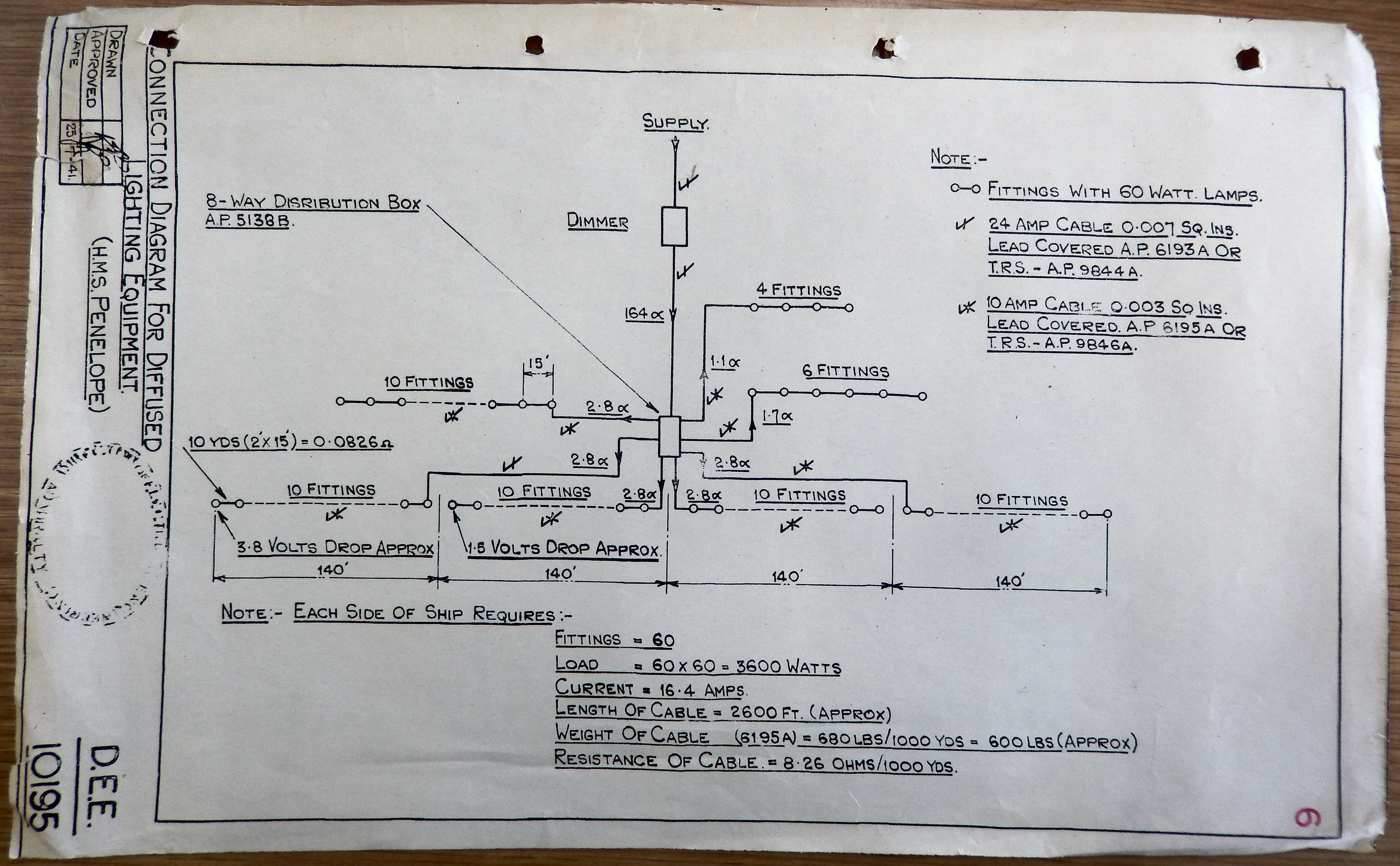
Connection diagram for HMS Penelope, showing 60 diffused lighting fittings

=== US Navy ===
The US Navy trialled an automatic system made by General Electric (Note: Not the same company as the British GEC.) of New York on the supply ship USS Hamul, but halted research in 1942. The US Navy sent its control system and diffused lighting fittings to Canada's NRC, which installed it on the corvettes HMCS Edmundston and HMCS Rimouski in 1943 and carried out further prototyping.

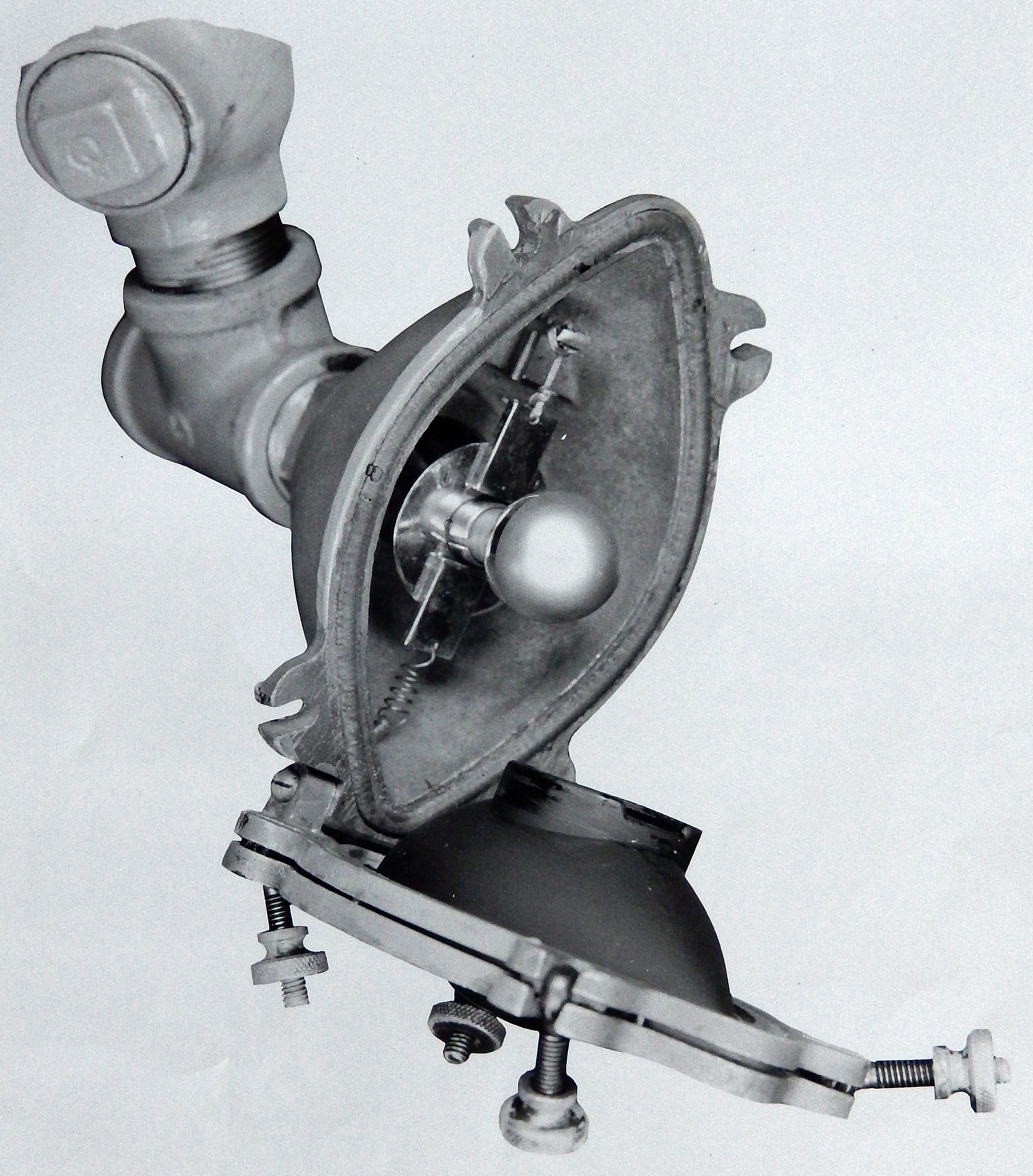
Diffused Lighting fitting for USS Hamul, short type

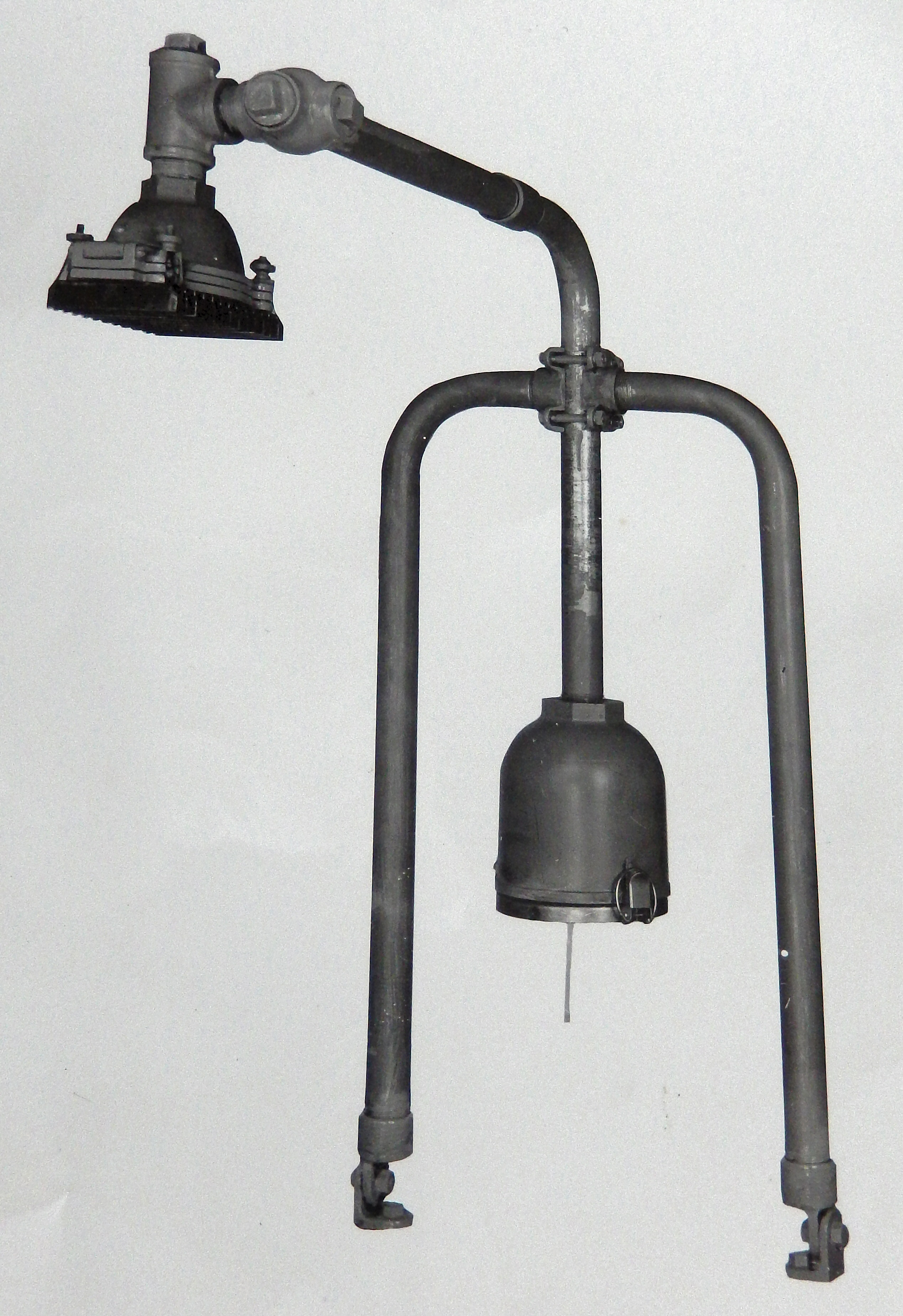
Diffused Lighting fitting for USS Hamul, long type

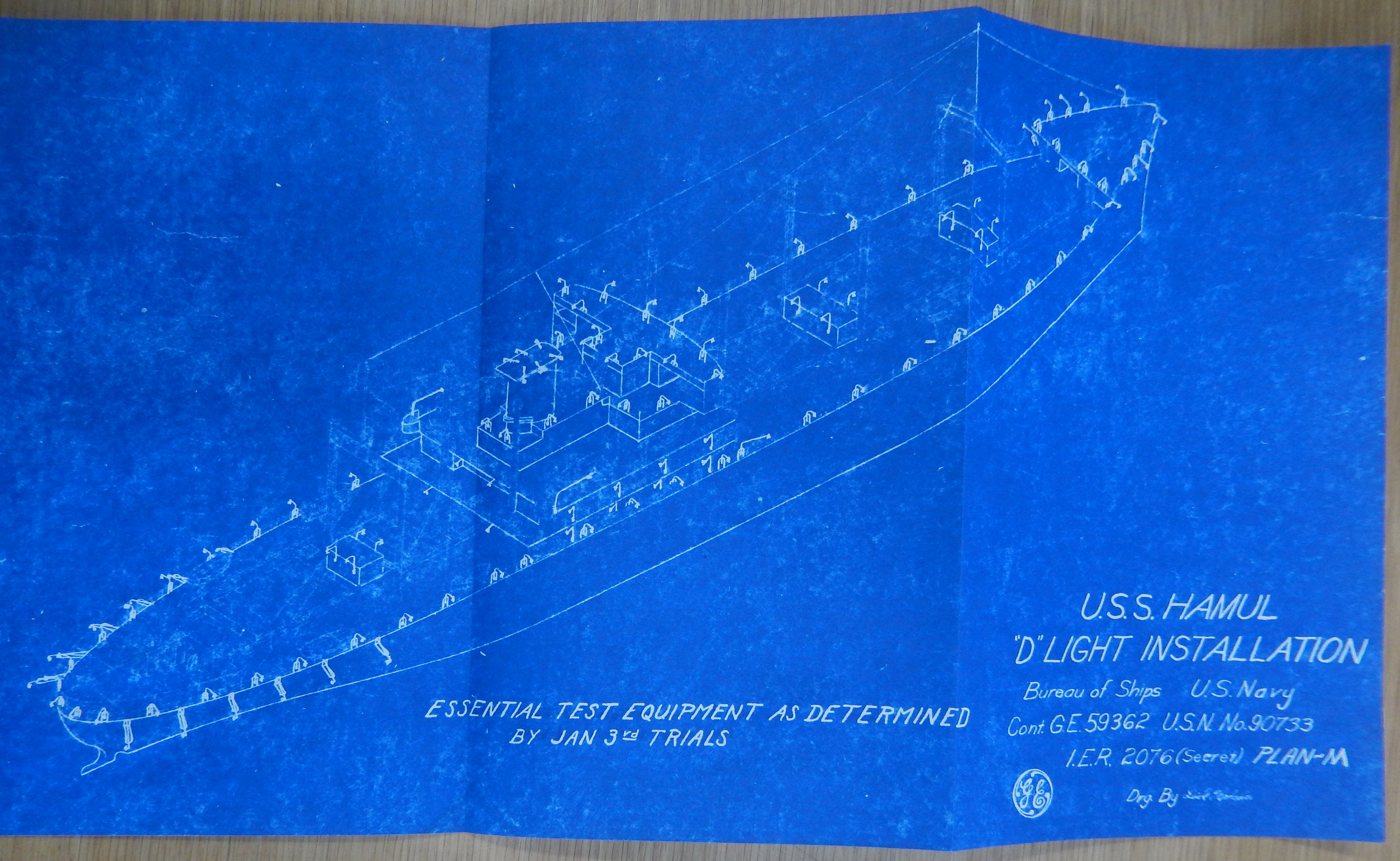
USS Hamul plan for Diffused Lighting camouflage fittings after the sea trials held on 3 January 1942

== Active service ==
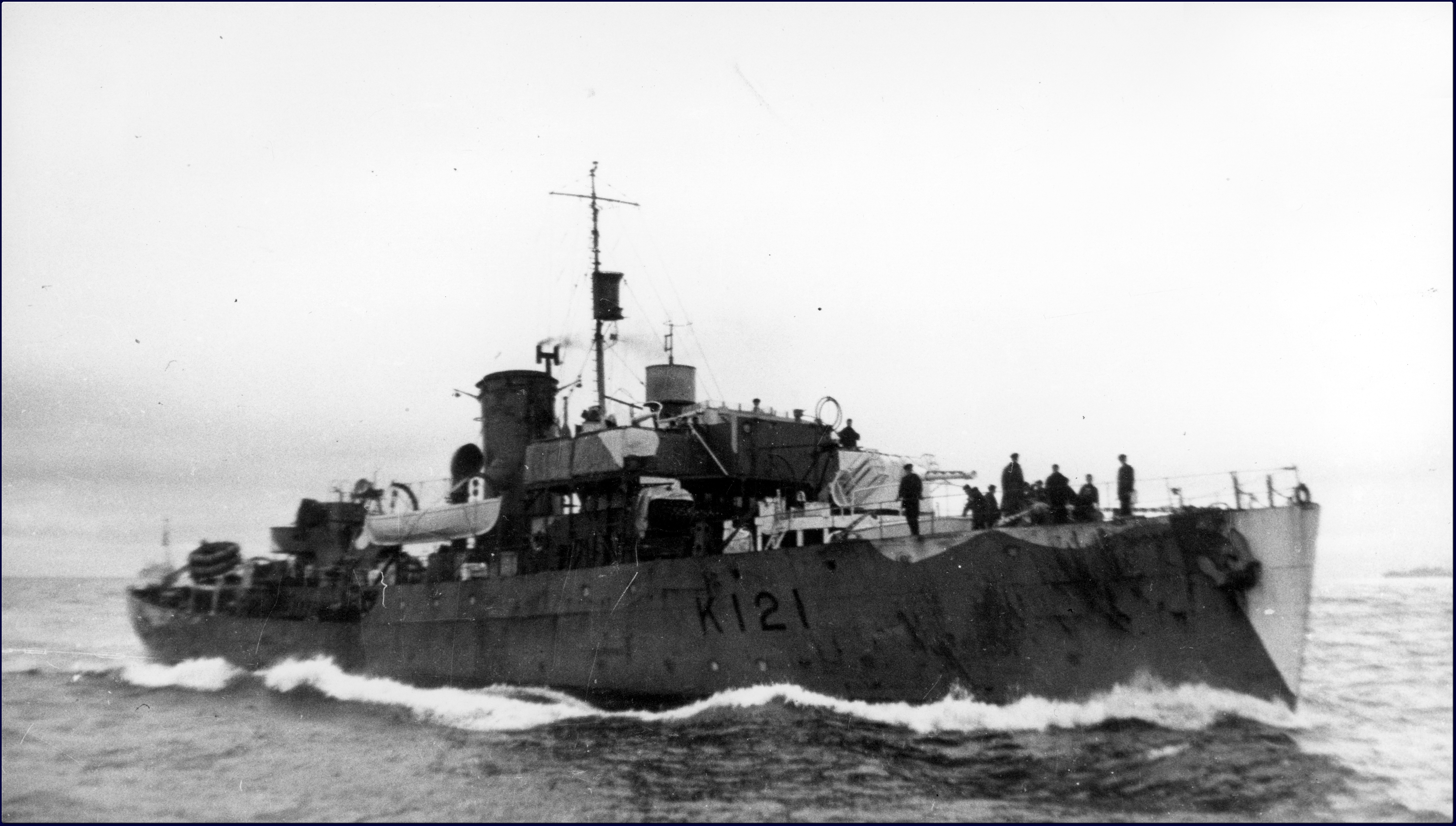
The Canadian corvette HMCS Rimouski used its diffused lighting camouflage to attack a U-boat.

Both Edmundston and Rimouski were fitted with about 60 light projectors: those on the hull were on retractable supports; those on the superstructure were on fixed supports. Each ship's diffused lighting system was tested systematically in St Margaret's Bay, and then trialled when actually escorting Atlantic convoys in 1943. Experimentally, the diffused lighting reduced the ships' visibility by up to 70%, but at sea the electrical equipment proved too delicate, and frequently malfunctioned. Worse, the system was slow to respond to changes in background lighting, and the Canadian Navy considered the lighting too green.

In September 1943, Rimouski, using her diffused lighting system, but also some navigation lights, approached German submarine U-536 in the Baie des Chaleurs. The intention was to make Rimouski appear as "a small and inoffensive ship" in an operation to trap the submarine, and this appears to have worked as the U-boat did not detect her. However the attack failed, as a wrong signal sent from shore alerted the submarine's commander, Kapitänleutnant Rolf Schauenburg; U-536 dived and escaped.

Following the Allied victory in the Battle of the Atlantic – through long-range aircraft, radar, code decryption, and better escort tactics – the need to camouflage ships from submarines greatly decreased, and diffused lighting research became a low priority. The work was halted when the war ended.

== In aircraft ==
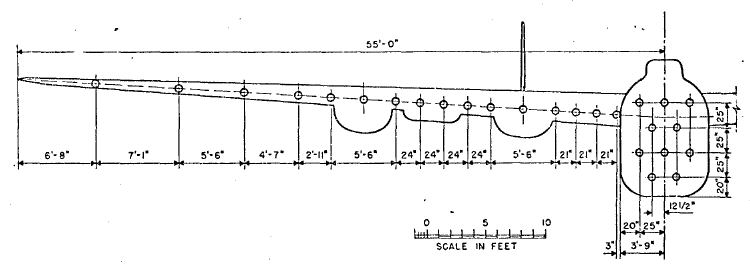
The Yehudi counter-illumination system of automatically adjusted forward-pointing lights was trialled in B-24 Liberators from 1943 onwards.

Because submarines at the surface could see the dark shape of an attacking aircraft against the night sky, the principle of diffused lighting camouflage also applied to aircraft. However, British researchers found that the amount of electrical power required to camouflage an aircraft's underside in daylight was prohibitive, while externally mounted light projectors disturbed the aircraft's aerodynamics.

An American version, "Yehudi", using lamps mounted in the aircraft's nose and the leading edges of the wings, was trialled in B-24 Liberators, Avenger torpedo bombers and a Navy glide bomb from 1943 to 1945. By directing the light forwards towards an observer (rather than towards the aircraft's skin), the system provided effective counter-illumination camouflage with an affordable use of energy, more like that of marine animals than the Canadian diffused lighting approach. But the system never entered active service, as radar became the principal means of detecting aircraft.

== See also ==
- Military camouflage
- Motion camouflage
- Ship camouflage
- Stealth technology

== Sources ==
- Burr, E. Godfrey. Illumination for Concealment of Ships at Night. Transactions of the Royal Society of Canada (Third series, volume XLI, May 1947), pages 45–54.
- Burr, E. Godfrey. Illumination for Concealment of Ships at Night: Some Technical Considerations. Transactions of the Royal Society of Canada (Third series, volume XLII, May 1948), pages 19–35.
