= HMS Largs =

Ocean liner used as command ship in the Second World War

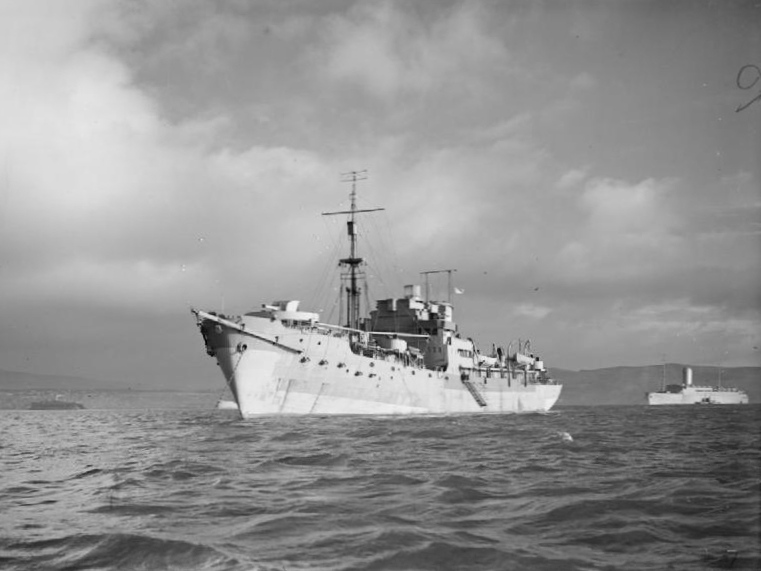
- HMS Largs at Greenock

History

France
- Name: MV Charles Plumier
- Owner: Compagnie Générale Transatlantique (The French Line)
- Builder: Chantiers & Ateliers de Provence at Port de Bouc
- Completed: October 1938
- Commissioned: 1938
- Fate: Seized by Royal Navy November 1941

United Kingdom
- Name: HMS Largs
- Acquired: November 1941
- Decommissioned: 1945
- Fate: Returned to France

France
- Commissioned: 1945
- Decommissioned: 1964
- Fate: Sold to Greek Cruise company

Greece
- Name: MV Pleias
- Commissioned: 1964
- Decommissioned: 1968
- Fate: Scrapped 1968

General characteristics
- Class & type: Cargo-passenger ship
- Tonnage: 4,626 tons GRT
- Length: 104,45 m
- Beam: 15,8 m
- Draught: deadweight 2386 tons
- Propulsion: 2 propellers, 2-stroke MAN-Diesel engines, 5200HP
- Speed: 14,5 Knots

HMS Largs was a former Compagnie Generale Transatlantique (French Line) fruit (banana) ship captured by the Royal Navy ship HMS Faulknor five months after the Battle of France while docked at Gibraltar in November 1940 and commissioned as an "ocean boarding vessel". She subsequently became a Combined Operations Headquarters ship for almost every significant amphibious operation of World War II, including Operations Torch, Husky and Overlord and she would be manned by naval, army and air force crew.

== Royal Navy Transfer ==
She was built by France and named MV Charles Plumier in 1938. Following the creation of Vichy France and Free France she was transferred in 1941 to the Royal Navy, instead of being handed over to the Free French Navy, and renamed HMS Largs. She took part in many operations including Operation Torch, the invasion of North Africa, and Operation Overlord, during the invasion of Normandy. she was the headquarters ship for Sword Beach.

== Camouflage research ==
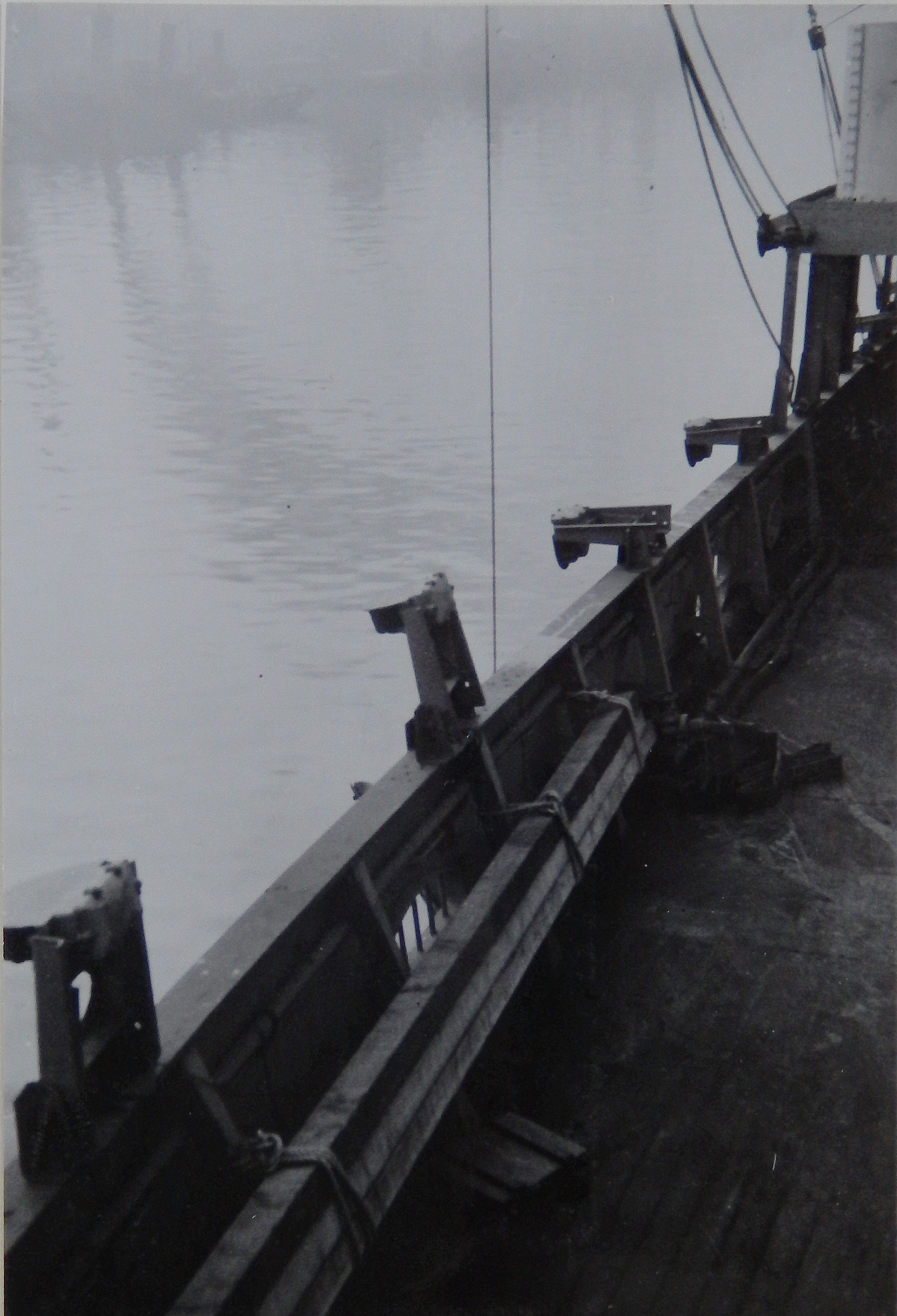
HMS Largs bulwark with diffused lighting camouflage fittings, 2 retracted (up), 2 deployed

HMS Largs was used in 1942 for secret trials of a Canadian invention, diffused lighting camouflage. This used dimmable lamps for counter-illumination, camouflage by bringing the brightness of the ship's superstructure to the same as the night sky. The system of 60 lamps reduced the distance at which a ship could be seen from a surfaced submarine by 25% using binoculars, or by 33% using the naked eye. It worked best on clear moonless nights, at best preventing Largs from being seen until it closed to 2,250 yards (2,060 m) when counter-illuminated, compared to 5,250 yards (4,800 m) unlighted, a 57% reduction in range. However, with the development of marine radar, the system was not put into service.

== Pacific & Post WWII ==
In 1945 she was transferred to the Pacific War and used in actions off Thailand and Malaya. After the end of the war she was handed back to France, and served for nineteen years. She was sold off to a private company from Greece in 1964 as a cruise ship, and given the name MV Pleias. She was scrapped in 1968.

== Bibliography ==
- Holtham, Tony (February 2022). "HMS Warren Part Two – HMS Largs: A Lockdown Project". Marine News Supplement: Warships. 76 (2): S134–S141. ISSN 0966-6958.
