= Active camouflage =

Camouflage changing continually to match background

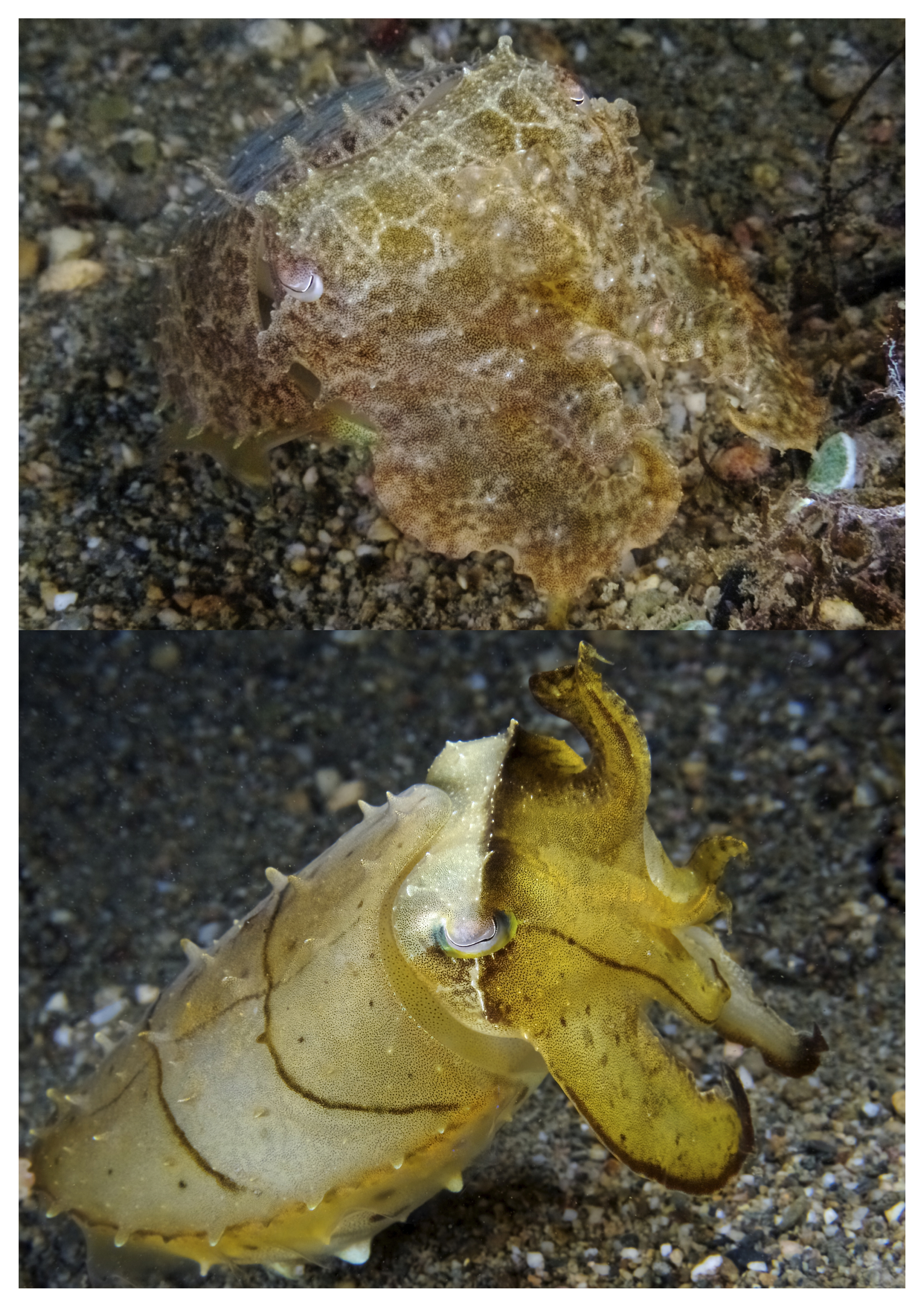
Cephalopod molluscs such as this cuttlefish can change color rapidly for signaling or to match their backgrounds.

Active camouflage, adaptive camouflage, or chameleonizing is camouflage that adapts, often rapidly, to the surroundings of an object such as an animal or military vehicle. In theory, active camouflage could provide perfect concealment from visual detection.

Active camouflage occurs in several groups of animals, including reptiles on land, and cephalopod molluscs and flatfish in the sea. Animals achieve active camouflage both by color change and (among marine animals such as squid) by counter-illumination, with the use of bioluminescence.

Military counter-illumination camouflage was first investigated during World War II for marine use. More recent research has aimed to achieve crypsis by using cameras to sense the visible background, and by controlling systems that can vary their appearance, such as coatings, or variable temperature infrared panels using the Peltier effect.

== In animals ==
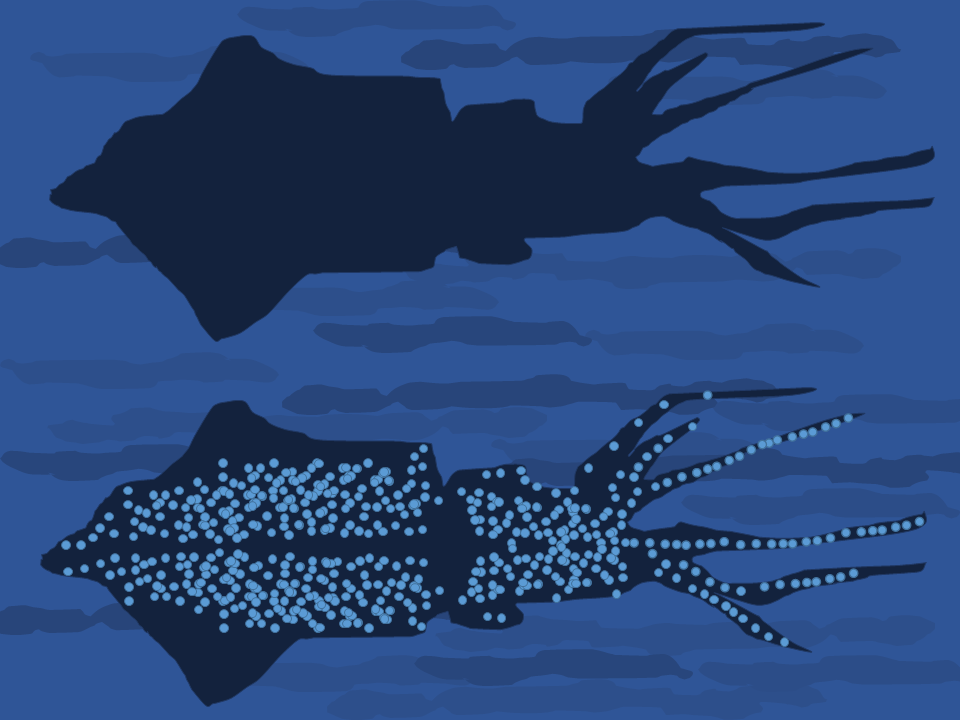
Counter-illumination camouflage of the firefly squid, Watasenia scintillans uses bioluminescence to match brightness and color of the sea surface above.

Active camouflage is used in several groups of animals including cephalopod molluscs, fish, and reptiles. There are two mechanisms of active camouflage in animals: color change and counter-illumination.

=== Counter-illumination ===
Counter-illumination is camouflage using the production of light to blend in against a lit background. In the sea, light comes down from the surface, so when marine animals are seen from below, they appear darker than the background. Some species of cephalopod, such as the eye-flash squid and the firefly squid, produce light in photophores on their undersides to match the background. Bioluminescence is common among marine animals, so counter-illumination may be widespread, though light has other functions, including attracting prey and signaling.

=== Color change ===
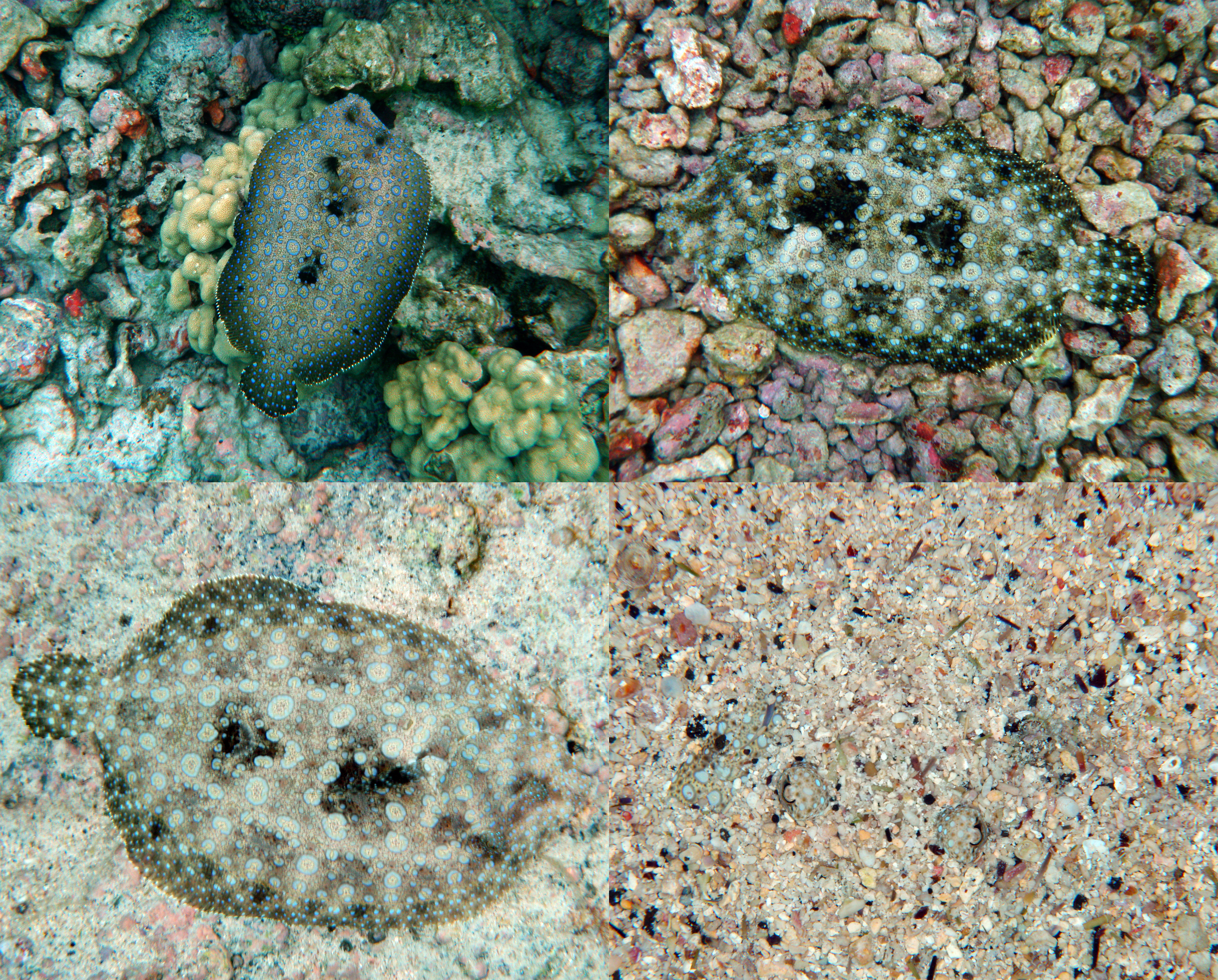
Four frames of a peacock flounder show its ability to match its coloration to the sea bed around and beneath it.

Color change permits camouflage against different backgrounds. Many cephalopods including octopuses, cuttlefish, and squids, and some terrestrial amphibians and reptiles including chameleons and anoles can rapidly change color and pattern, though the major reasons for this include signaling, not only camouflage. Cephalopod active camouflage has stimulated military research in the United States.

Active camouflage by color change is used by many bottom-living flatfish such as plaice, sole, and flounder that actively copy the patterns and colors of the seafloor below them. For example, the tropical flounder Bothus ocellatus can match its pattern to "a wide range of background textures" in 2–8 seconds. Similarly, the coral reef fish, the seaweed blenny can match its coloration to its surroundings.

== In research ==
Active camouflage provides concealment by making an object not merely generally similar to its surroundings, but effectively invisible with "illusory transparency" through accurate mimicry, and by changing the appearance of the object as changes occur in its background.

=== Early research ===
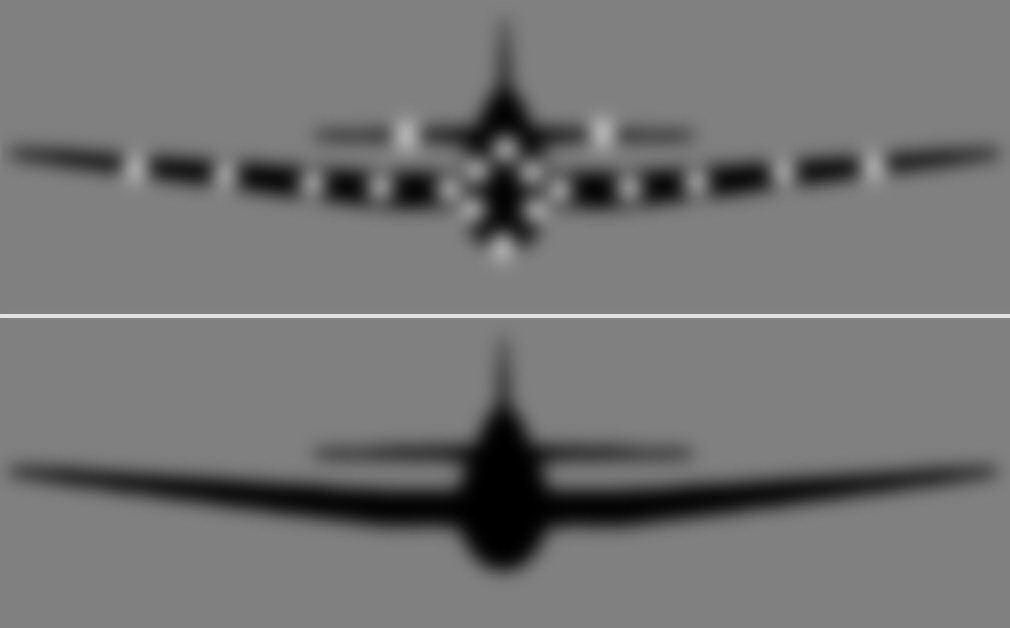
Yehudi lights prototype raised the average brightness of a Grumman Avenger from a dark shape to the same as the sky.

Military interest in active camouflage has its origins in Second World War studies of counter-illumination. The first of these was the so-called diffused lighting camouflage tested on Canadian Navy corvettes including HMCS Rimouski. This was followed in the United States Army Air Forces with the airborne Yehudi lights project, and trials in ships of the Royal Navy and the US Navy. The Yehudi lights project placed low-intensity blue lights on aircraft. As skies are bright, an unilluminated aircraft (of any color) might be rendered visible. By emitting a small, measured amount of blue light, the aircraft's average brightness better matches that of the sky, and the aircraft is able to fly closer to its target before being detected.

=== Possible technologies ===
Active camouflage may now develop using organic light-emitting diodes and other technologies which allow images to be projected onto irregularly shaped surfaces. Using visual data from a camera, an object could perhaps be camouflaged well enough to avoid detection by the human eye and optical sensors when stationary. Camouflage is weakened by motion, but active camouflage could still make moving targets more difficult to see. However, active camouflage works best in one direction at a time, requiring knowledge of the relative positions of the observer and the concealed object.

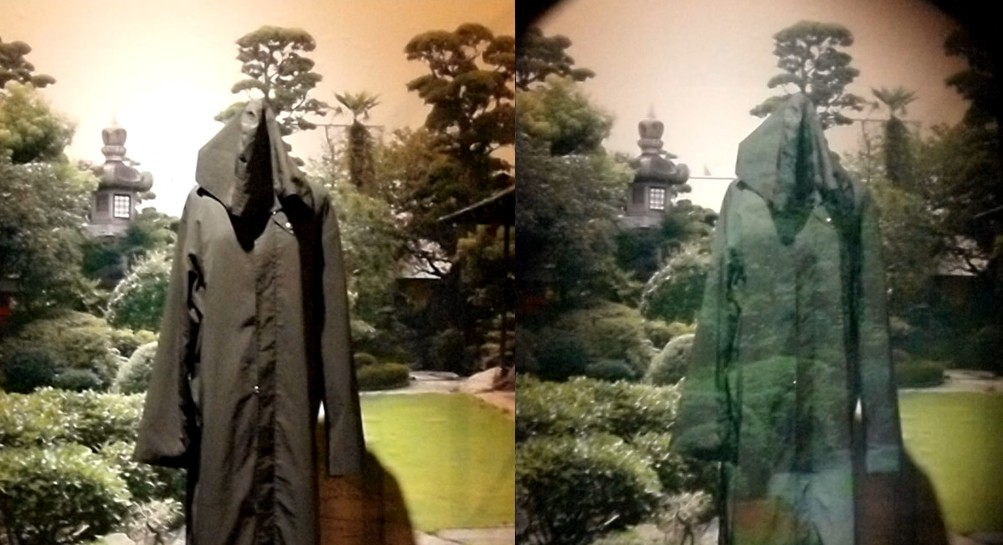
An invisibility cloak using active camouflage by Susumu Tachi. Left: The cloth seen without a special device. Right: The same cloth seen through the half-mirror projector part of the Retro-Reflective Projection Technology

In 2003 researchers at the University of Tokyo under Susumu Tachi created a prototype active camouflage system using material impregnated with retroreflective glass beads. The viewer stands in front of the cloth viewing the cloth through a transparent glass plate. A video camera behind the cloth captures the background behind the cloth. A video projector projects this image on to the glass plate which is angled so that it acts as a partial mirror reflecting a small portion of the projected light onto the cloth. The retroreflectors in the cloth reflect the image back towards the glass plate which being only weakly reflecting allows most of the retroreflected light to pass through to be seen by the viewer. The system only works when seen from a certain angle.

Phased-array optics would implement active camouflage, not by producing a two-dimensional image of background scenery on an object, but by computational holography to produce a three-dimensional hologram of background scenery on an object to be concealed. Unlike a two-dimensional image, the holographic image would appear to be the actual scenery behind the object independent of viewer distance or view angle.

=== Military prototypes ===
An armoured vehicle fitted with Adaptiv infrared side panels, switched off (left), and on to simulate a large car (right)

In 2010, the Israeli company Eltics created an early prototype of a system of tiles for infrared camouflage of vehicles. In 2011, BAE Systems announced its Adaptiv infrared camouflage technology. Adaptiv uses about 1000 hexagonal Peltier panels to cover the sides of a tank. The panels are rapidly heated and cooled to match either the temperature of the vehicle's surroundings, or one of the objects in the thermal cloaking system's library such as a truck, car or large rock.

== In fiction ==
Active camouflage technology, both visual and otherwise, is a commonly used plot device in science fiction stories. The Star Trek franchise incorporated the concept ("cloaking device"), and Star Trek: Voyager depicts humans using "bio-dampeners" to infiltrate a Borg Cube without the antagonists realizing they are there. The eponymous antagonists in the Predator films also use active camouflage. In many video games, such as the Halo series, Deus Ex: Human Revolution, and the Crysis series, players can obtain and use cloaking devices. In the 2002 James Bond film Die Another Day, Bond's Aston Martin V12 Vanquish is fitted with an active camouflage system.

== See also ==
- Cloaking device
- Cloak of invisibility
- Penetration aid
- Snow camouflage – color change with the seasons
- Stealth technology
