= HMCS Kamloops =

Flower-class corvette

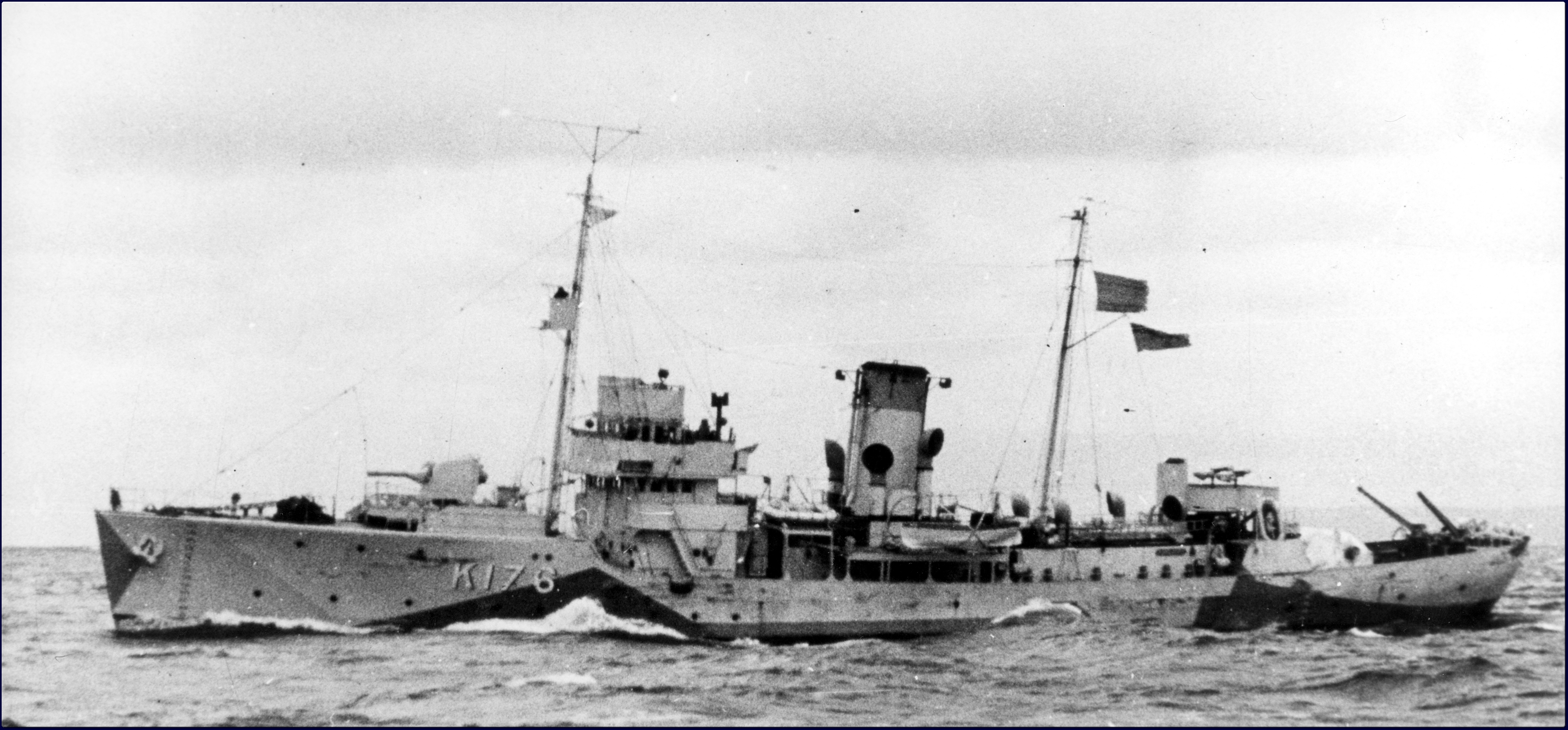
- HMCS Kamloops as a training ship, circa 1942.

History

Canada
- Name: Kamloops
- Namesake: Kamloops, British Columbia
- Ordered: 14 February 1940
- Builder: Victoria Machinery Depot Co. Ltd., Victoria, British Columbia
- Laid down: 29 April 1940
- Launched: 7 August 1940
- Commissioned: 17 March 1941
- Decommissioned: 27 June 1945
- Identification: Pennant number: K176
- Honours and awards: Atlantic 1941/43-45; Gulf of St. Lawrence 1942
- Fate: Sold on 19 October 1945 for scrapping

General characteristics
- Class & type: Flower-class corvette (original)
- Displacement: 925 long tons (940 t; 1,036 short tons)
- Length: 205 ft (62.48 m)o/a
- Beam: 33 ft (10.06 m)
- Draught: 11.5 ft (3.51 m)
- Propulsion: single shaft; 2 × fire tube Scotch boilers; 1 × 4-cycle triple-expansion reciprocating steam engine; 2,750 ihp (2,050 kW)
- Speed: 16 knots (29.6 km/h)
- Range: 3,500 nautical miles (6,482 km) at 12 knots (22.2 km/h)
- Complement: 85
- Sensors & processing systems: 1 × SW1C or 2C radar; 1 × Type 123A or Type 127DV sonar
- Armament: 1 × BL 4 in (102 mm) Mk.IX single gun; 2 × .50 cal machine gun (twin); 2 × Lewis .303 cal machine gun (twin); 2 × Mk.II depth charge throwers; 2 × depth charge rails with 40 depth charges

HMCS Kamloops was a Flower-class corvette that served in the Royal Canadian Navy during the Second World War. She served primarily in the Battle of the Atlantic as an ocean escort. She was named for Kamloops, British Columbia.

== Background ==
Flower-class corvettes like Kamloops serving with the Royal Canadian Navy during the Second World War were different from earlier and more traditional sail-driven corvettes. The "corvette" designation was created by the French as a class of small warships; the Royal Navy borrowed the term for a period but discontinued its use in 1877. During the hurried preparations for war in the late 1930s, Winston Churchill reactivated the corvette class, needing a name for smaller ships used in an escort capacity, in this case based on a whaling ship design. The generic name "flower" was used to designate the class of these ships, which – in the Royal Navy – were named after flowering plants.

Corvettes commissioned by the Royal Canadian Navy during the Second World War were named after communities for the most part, to better represent the people who took part in building them. This idea was put forth by Admiral Percy W. Nelles. Sponsors were commonly associated with the community for which the ship was named. Royal Navy corvettes were designed as open sea escorts, while Canadian corvettes were developed for coastal auxiliary roles which was exemplified by their minesweeping gear. Eventually the Canadian corvettes would be modified to allow them to perform better on the open seas.

== Construction ==
Originally named Jasper for Jasper, Alberta, she was ordered on 14 February 1940 as part of the 1939-1940 Flower-class building program. She was laid down on 29 April 1940 by Victoria Machinery Depot Co. Ltd. at Victoria, British Columbia and launched 7 August later that year. Before commissioning, her name was changed to Kamloops due to a name conflict with Royal Navy vessel and she was commissioned as such into the Royal Canadian Navy on 17 March 1941 at Victoria. Kamloops had two major refits during her career. The first took place at Liverpool, Nova Scotia beginning in February 1943 and took three months to complete. The second refit began mid-December 1943 and was completed in April 1944. The refit took place at Charlottetown during which her fo'c'sle was extended.

== War duty ==
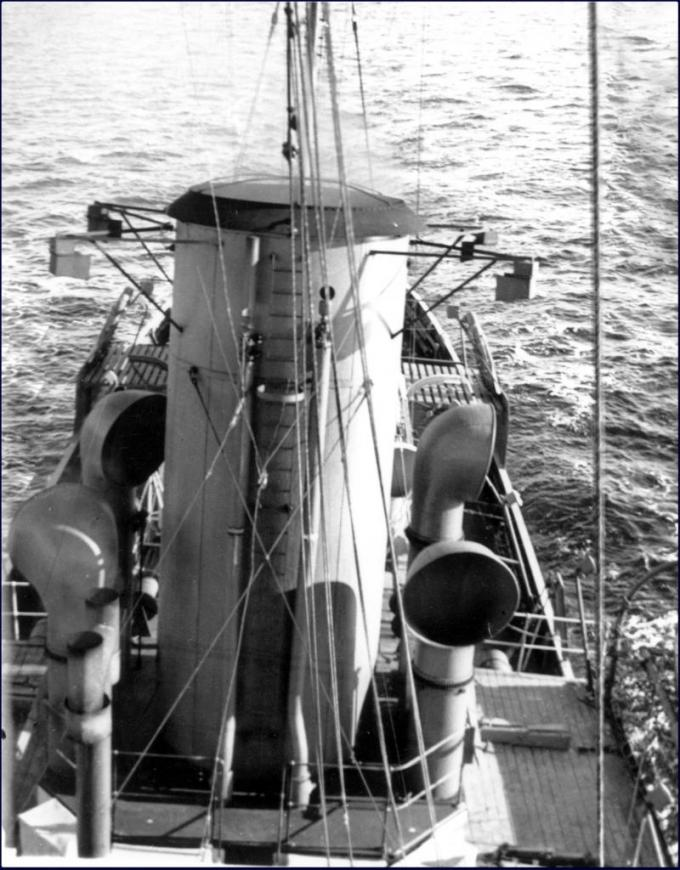
HMCS Kamloops with diffused lighting camouflage fittings on struts around the funnel

Kamloops arrived in Halifax in June 1941. She was assigned to Halifax Force and spent the rest of the year as a local escort. In September 1941, she took part in the Canadian Navy's secret trials of diffused lighting camouflage, a technology for concealing ships from submarines at night. In January 1942 she began use as an anti-submarine training ship in Halifax and Pictou, which lasted until January 1943 before heading off for refit.

After the refit, Kamloops joined Western Local Escort Force (WLEF) in March 1943 for a brief period before transferring Mid-Ocean Escort Force (MOEF) escort group C-2 in June. She remained with this group until the end of the war. During her service with C-2, Kamloops took part in the severe convoy battle for ONS 18/ON 202, which lost six merchant ships and three escorts.

At the end of the war, Kamloops was paid off on 27 June 1945 at Sorel, Quebec. She was sold for scrap later that year on 19 October and broken up at Amherstburg, Ontario.
