= Counter-illumination =

Active camouflage using light matched to the background

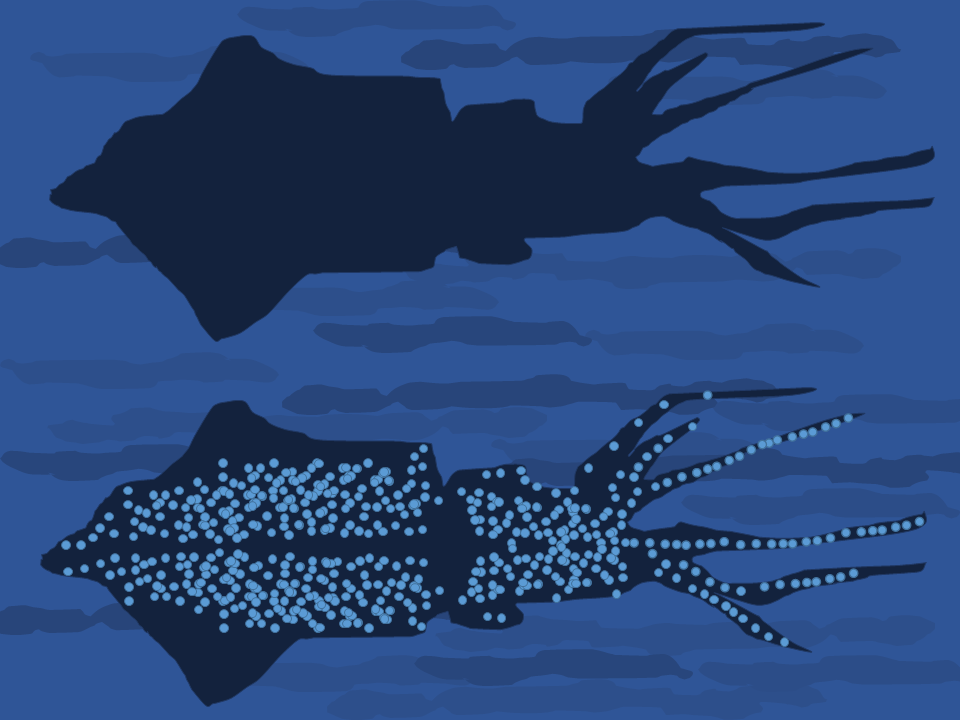
Principle of the counter-illumination camouflage of the firefly squid, Watasenia scintillans. When seen from below by a predator, the animal's light helps to match its brightness and colour to the sea surface above.

Counter-illumination is a method of active camouflage seen in marine animals such as firefly squid and midshipman fish, and in military prototypes, producing light to match their backgrounds in both brightness and wavelength.

Marine animals of the mesopelagic (mid-water) zone tend to appear dark against the bright water surface when seen from below. They can camouflage themselves, often from predators but also from their prey, by producing light with bioluminescent photophores on their downward-facing surfaces, reducing the contrast of their silhouettes against the background. The light may be produced by the animals themselves, or by symbiotic bacteria, often Aliivibrio fischeri.

Counter-illumination differs from countershading, which uses only pigments such as melanin to reduce the appearance of shadows. It is one of the dominant types of aquatic camouflage, along with transparency and silvering. All three methods make animals in open water resemble their environment.

Counter-illumination has not come into widespread military use, but during the Second World War it was trialled in ships in the Canadian diffused lighting camouflage project, and in aircraft in the American Yehudi lights project.

== In marine animals ==
=== Mechanism ===
==== Counter-illumination and countershading ====
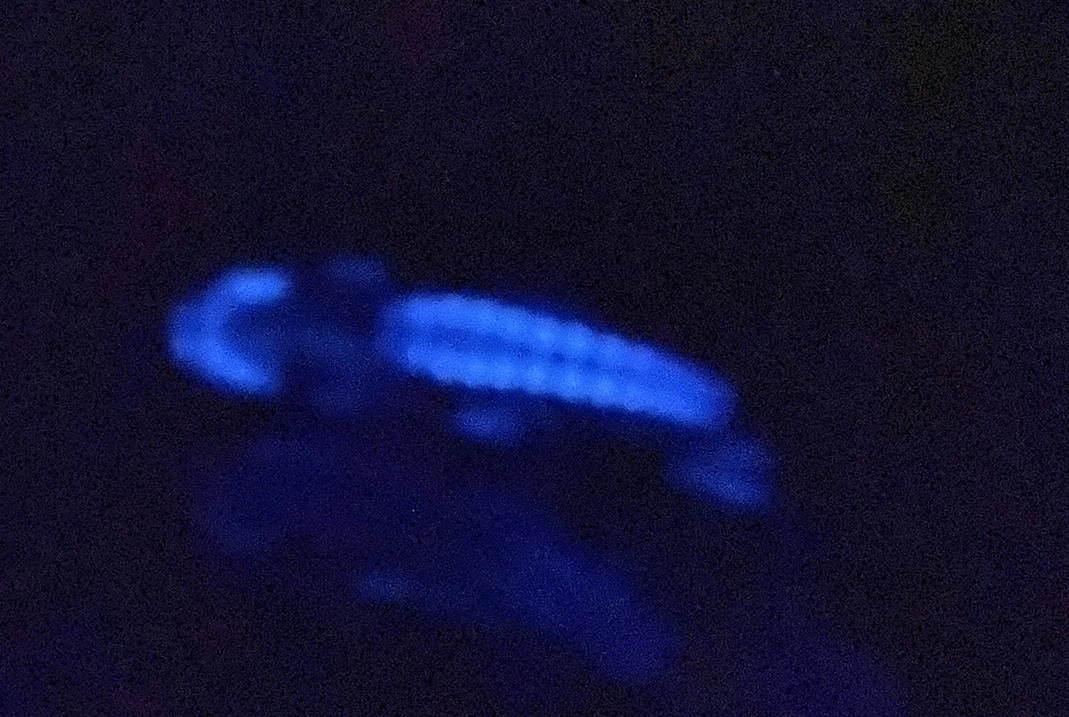
Counter-illuminating photophores illuminating the underside of the hatchetfish Argyropelecus olfersii

In the sea, counter-illumination is one of three dominant methods of underwater camouflage, the other two being transparency and silvering. Among marine animals, especially crustaceans, cephalopods, and fish, counter-illumination camouflage occurs where bioluminescent light from photophores on an organism's ventral surface is matched to the light radiating from the environment. The bioluminescence is used to obscure the organism's silhouette produced by the down-welling light. Counter-illumination differs from countershading, also used by many marine animals, which uses pigments to darken the upper side of the body while the underside is as light as possible with pigment, namely white. Countershading fails when the light falling on the animal's underside is too weak to make it appear roughly as bright as the background. This commonly occurs when the background is the relatively bright ocean surface, and the animal is swimming in the mesopelagic depths of the sea. Counter-illumination goes further than countershading, actually brightening the underside of the body.

==== Photophores ====
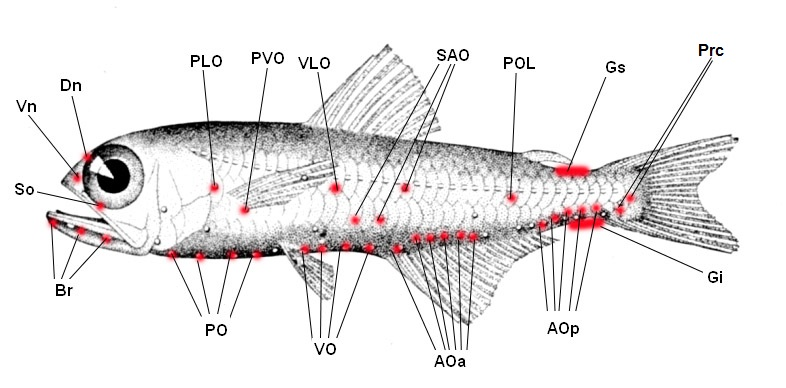
Photophores on a lanternfish, the most common deep sea fish worldwide

Counter-illumination relies on organs that produce light, photophores. These are roughly spherical structures that appear as luminous spots on many marine animals, including fish and cephalopods. The organ can be simple, or as complex as the human eye, equipped with lenses, shutters, colour filters and reflectors.

Sagittal section of the large eye-like light-producing organ of Hawaiian bobtail squid, Euprymna scolopes. The organ houses symbiotic Aliivibrio fischeri bacteria.

In the Hawaiian bobtail squid (Euprymna scolopes) light is produced in a large and complex two-lobed light organ inside the squid's mantle cavity. At the top of the organ (dorsal side) is a reflector, directing the light downwards. Below this are containers (crypts) lined with epithelium containing light-producing symbiotic bacteria. Below those is a kind of iris, consisting of branches (diverticula) of its ink sac; and below that is a lens. Both the reflector and the lens are derived from mesoderm. Light escapes from the organ downwards, some of it travelling directly, some coming off the reflector. Some 95% of the light-producing bacteria are voided at dawn every morning; the population in the light organ then builds up slowly during the day to a maximum of some 10^{12} bacteria by nightfall: this species hides in sand away from predators during the day, and does not attempt counter-illumination during daylight, which would in any case require much brighter light than its light organ output. The emitted light shines through the skin of the squid's underside. To reduce light production, the squid can change the shape of its iris; it can also adjust the strength of yellow filters on its underside, which presumably change the balance of wavelengths emitted. The light production is correlated with the intensity of down-welling light but about one third as bright; the squid is able to track repeated changes in brightness.

==== Matching light intensity and wavelength ====
At night, nocturnal organisms match both the wavelength and the light intensity of their bioluminescence to that of the down-welling moonlight and direct it downward as they swim, to help them remain unnoticed by any observers below.

Spectrum of visible light showing colours at different wavelengths, in nanometres

In the eyeflash squid (Abralia veranyi) a species which daily migrates between the surface and deep waters, a study showed that the light produced is bluer in cold waters and greener in warmer waters, temperature serving as a guide to the required emission spectrum. The animal has more than 550 photophores on its underside, consisting of rows of four to six large photophores running across the body, and many smaller photophores scattered over the surface. In cold water at 11 Celsius, the squid's photophores produced a simple (unimodal) spectrum with its peak at 490 nanometres (blue-green). In warmer water at 24 Celsius, the squid added a weaker emission (forming a shoulder on the side of the main peak) at around 440 nanometres (blue), from the same group of photophores. Other groups remained unilluminated: other species, and perhaps A. veranyi from its other groups of photophores, can produce a third spectral component when needed. Another squid, Abralia trigonura, is able to produce three spectral components: at 440 and at 536 nanometres (green), appearing at 25 Celsius, apparently from the same photophores; and at 470–480 nanometres (blue-green), easily the strongest component at 6 Celsius, apparently from a different group of photophores. Many species can in addition vary the light they emit by passing it through a choice of colour filters.

Counterillumination camouflage halved predation among individuals employing it compared to those not employing it in the midshipman fish Porichthys notatus.

Diagram of a small type of photophore in the skin of a cephalopod, Abralia trigonura, in vertical section

==== Autogenic or bacteriogenic bioluminescence ====
The bioluminescence used for counter-illumination can be either autogenic (produced by the animal itself, as in pelagic cephalopods such as Vampyroteuthis, Stauroteuthis, and pelagic octopuses in the Bolitaenidae) or bacteriogenic (produced by bacterial symbionts). The luminescent bacterium is often Aliivibrio fischeri, as for example in the Hawaiian bobtail squid.

=== Purpose ===
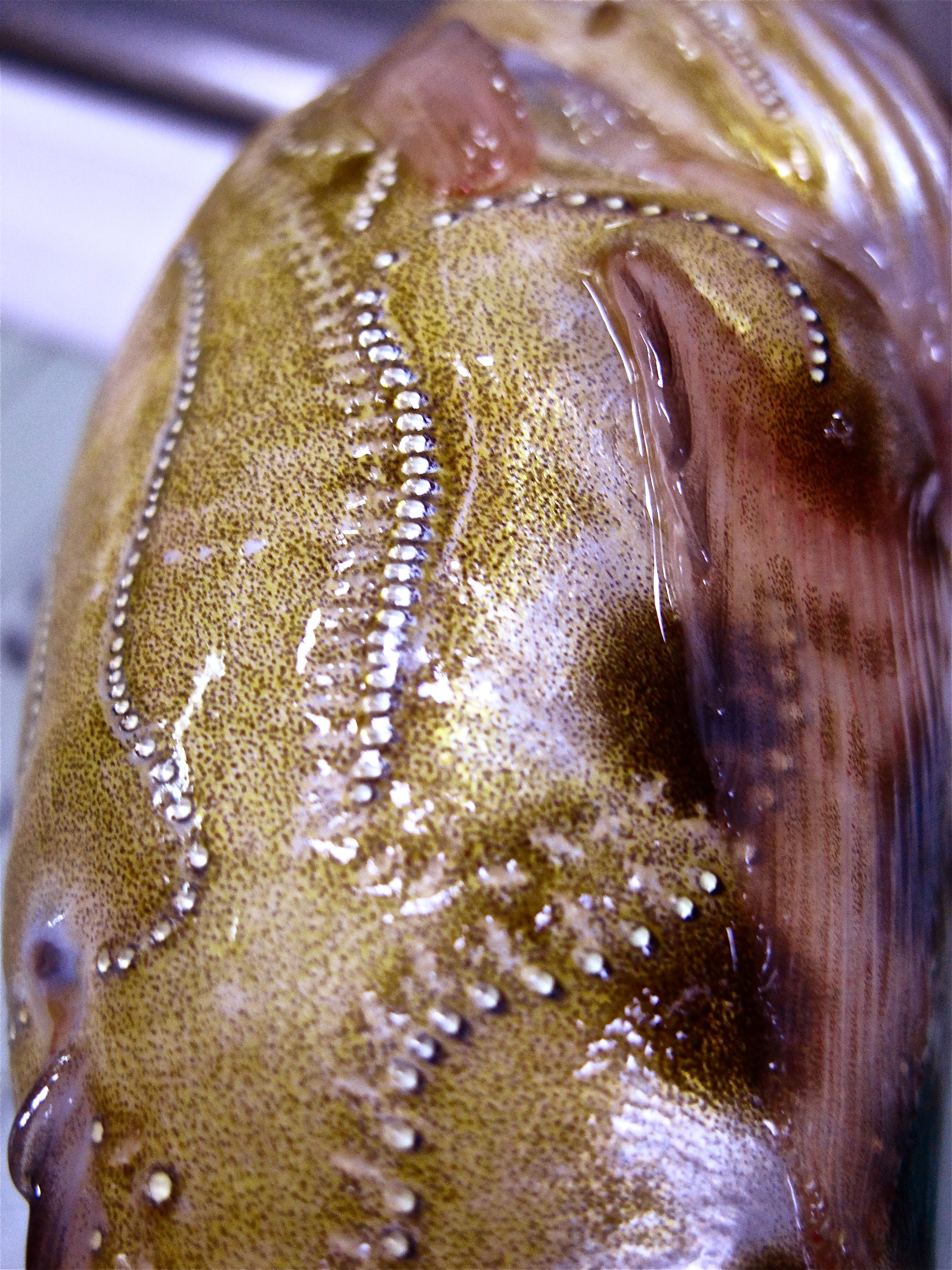
Photophores on a nocturnal midshipman fish, whose bioluminescence halves its rate of predation

==== Hiding from predators ====
Reducing the silhouette is primarily an anti-predator defence for mesopelagic (mid-water) organisms. The reduction of the silhouette from highly directional down-welling light is important, since there is no refuge in the open water, and predation occurs from below. Many mesopelagic cephalopods such as the firefly squid (Watasenia scintillans), decapod crustaceans, and deep ocean fishes use counter-illumination; it works best for them when ambient light levels are low, leaving the diffuse down-welling light from above as the only light source. Some deep water sharks, including Dalatias licha, Etmopterus lucifer, and Etmopterus granulosus, are bioluminescent, most likely for camouflage from predators that attack from beneath.

==== Hiding from prey ====
Besides its effectiveness as a predator avoidance mechanism, counter-illumination also serves as an essential tool to predators themselves. Some shark species, such as the deepwater velvet belly lanternshark (Etmopterus spinax), use counter-illumination to remain hidden from their prey. Other well-studied examples include the cookiecutter shark (Isistius brasiliensis), the marine hatchetfish, and the Hawaiian bobtail squid. More than 10% of shark species may be bioluminescent, though some such as lantern sharks may use the light for signalling as well as for camouflage.

=== Defeating counter-illumination camouflage ===
An animal camouflaged by counter-illumination is not completely invisible. A predator could resolve individual photophores on a camouflaged prey's underside, given sufficiently acute vision, or it could detect the remaining difference in brightness between the prey and the background. Predators with a visual acuity of 0.11 degrees (of arc) would be able to detect individual photophores of the Madeira lanternfish Ceratoscopelus maderensis at up to 2 metres (2.2 yd), and they would be able to see the general layout of the photophore clusters with poorer visual acuity. Much the same applies also to Abralia veranyi, but it was largely given away by its unlit fins and tentacles, which appear dark against the background from as far away as 8 metres (8.7 yd). All the same, the counter-illumination camouflage of these species is extremely effective, radically reducing their detectability. (Note: The pattern of photophores may, in addition to matching background brightness, also serve to break up the animals' silhouettes, just as spots and stripes of coloured paint do in disruptive coloration, but in the absence of experimental evidence it is uncertain how useful this is: it would only help when the sea surface background was uneven.)

== Military prototypes ==
Active camouflage in the form of counter-illumination has rarely been used for military purposes, but it has been prototyped in ship and aircraft camouflage from the Second World War onwards.

=== For ships ===
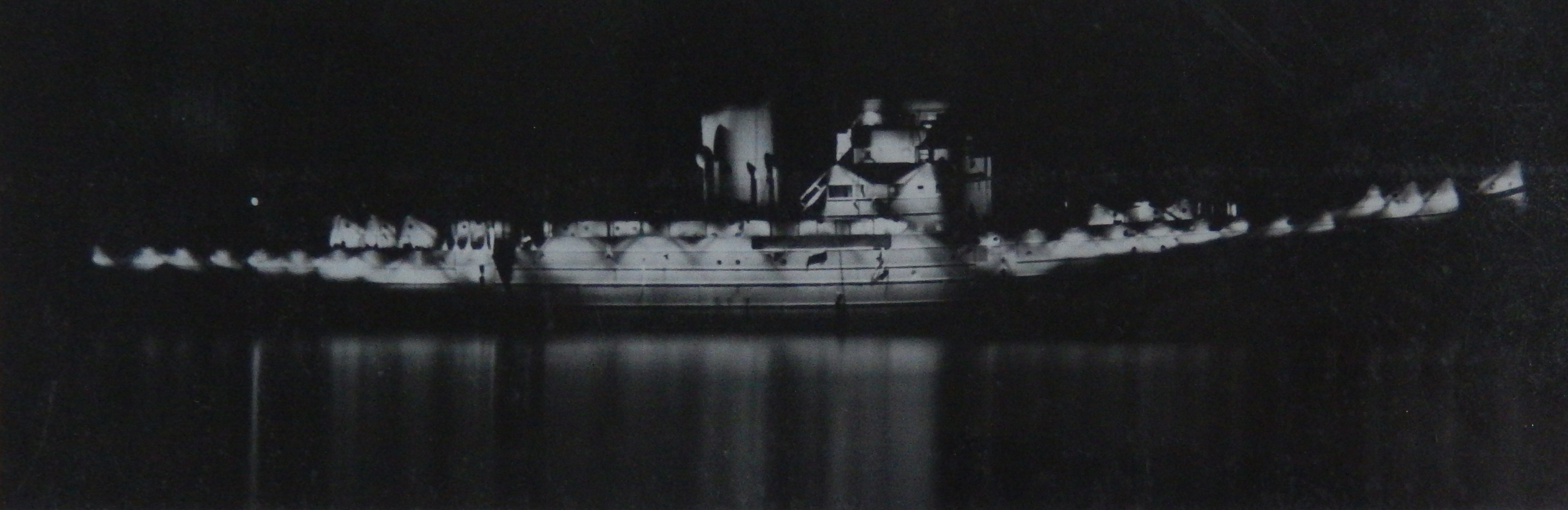
Diffused lighting camouflage prototype, not quite complete and set to maximum brightness, installed on HMS Largs in 1942

Diffused lighting camouflage, in which visible light is projected on to the sides of ships to match the faint glow of the night sky, was trialled by Canada's National Research Council from 1941 onwards, and then by the Royal Navy, during the Second World War. Some 60 light projectors were mounted all around the hull and on the ships' superstructure such as the bridge and funnels. On average, the system reduced the distance at which a ship could be seen from a surfaced submarine by 25% using binoculars, or by 33% using the naked eye. The camouflage worked best on clear moonless nights: on such a night in January 1942, HMS Largs was not seen until it closed to 2,250 yards (2,060 m) when counter-illuminated, but was visible at 5,250 yards (4,800 m) unlighted, a 57% reduction in range.

=== For aircraft ===
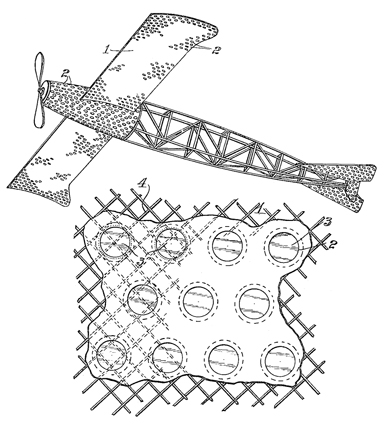
Mary Taylor Brush's 1917 patent application for camouflaging a Morane-Borel monoplane using light bulbs

In 1916 the American artist Mary Taylor Brush experimented with camouflage on a Morane-Borel monoplane using light bulbs around the aircraft, and filed a 1917 patent that claimed she was "able to produce a machine which is practically invisible when in the air". The concept was not developed further during the First World War.

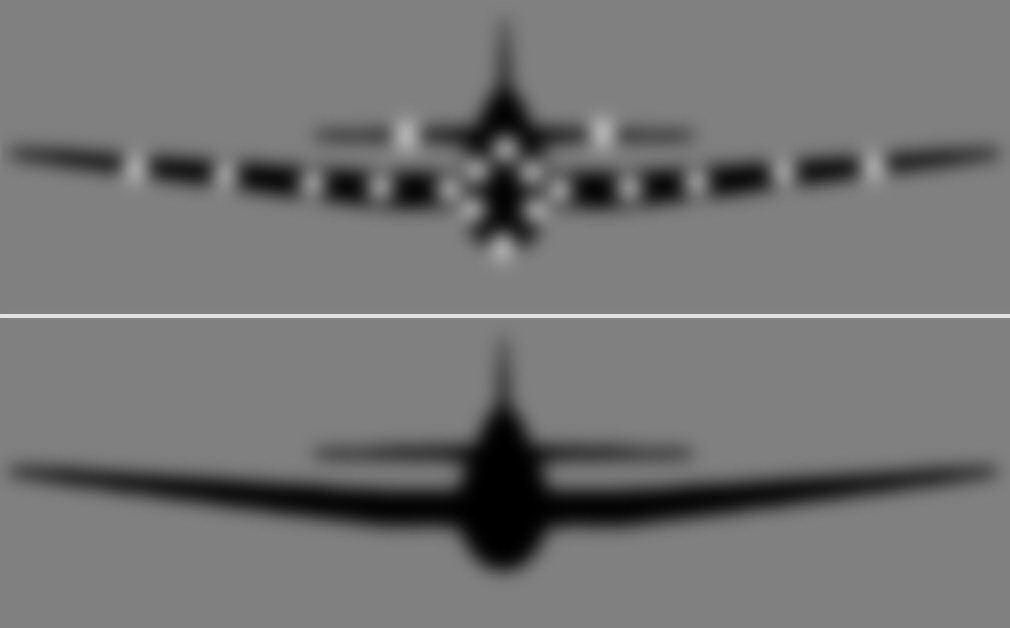
Forward-pointing Yehudi lights on Grumman TBM Avenger raised the average brightness of the plane from a dark shape to the same as the sky. (Note: The effect may be seen by standing back a little from the image and half-closing the eyes. The upper image becomes indistinct where the lower image remains as a dark shape.)

The Canadian ship concept was trialled in American aircraft including B-24 Liberators and TBM Avengers in the Yehudi lights project, starting in 1943, using forward-pointing lamps automatically adjusted to match the brightness of the sky. The goal was to enable a radar-equipped, sea-search aircraft to approach a surfaced submarine to within 30 seconds from arrival before being seen, to enable the aircraft to drop its depth charges before the submarine could dive. There was insufficient electrical power available to illuminate the entire surface of the aircraft, and outboard lamps in the manner of diffused lighting camouflage would have interfered with the airflow over the aircraft's surface, so a system of forward-pointing lamps was chosen. These had a beam with a radius of 3 degrees, so pilots had to fly with the aircraft's nose pointed directly at the enemy. In a crosswind, this required a curving approach path, rather than a straight-line path with the nose pointed upwind. In trials in 1945, a counter-illuminated Avenger was not seen until 3,000 yards (2.7 km) from its target, compared to 12 miles (19 km) for an uncamouflaged aircraft.

The idea was revisited in 1973 when an F-4 Phantom was fitted with camouflaging lights in the "Compass Ghost" project.
