= Yehudi lights =

Active camouflage system prototype for World War II aircraft

- Yehudi lights fitted to engine cowling and leading edges of a Grumman TBM-3D Avenger
- Keywords: Active camouflage Counter-illumination
- Project type: Military research
- Funding agency: US Navy
- Objective: Make brightness of aircraft match their backgrounds
- Duration: 1943 – 1945

Yehudi lights are lamps of automatically controlled brightness placed on the front and leading edges of an aircraft to raise the aircraft's luminance to the average brightness of the sky, a form of active camouflage using counter-illumination. They were designed to camouflage the aircraft by preventing it from appearing as a dark object against the sky.

The technology was developed by the US Navy from 1943 onwards, to enable a sea-search aircraft to approach a surfaced submarine to "within 30 seconds of flying time" before becoming visible to the submarine's crew. This in turn enabled the aircraft to engage the submarine with depth charges before it could dive, to counter the threat from German submarines to allied shipping. The concept was based on earlier research by the Royal Canadian Navy in its diffused lighting camouflage project.

Yehudi lights were unused in the war and were made obsolete by advanced postwar radar. With 1970s improvements in stealth technology, they again attracted interest.

== Etymology ==
A US National Defense Research Committee report on the history of the project explains in a footnote that the name "Yehudi" in then-contemporary slang meant "the little man who wasn't there". The slang may perhaps allude to the popular catchphrase and novelty song "Who's Yehudi?" or "Who's Yehoodi?". The catchphrase is said to have originated when violinist Yehudi Menuhin was a guest on the popular radio program of Bob Hope, where sidekick Jerry Colonna, apparently finding the name itself humorous, repeatedly asked "Who's Yehudi?". Colonna continued the gag on later shows without Menuhin, turning "Yehudi" into a widely understood late 1930s slang reference for a mysteriously absent person.

== Canadian origins ==
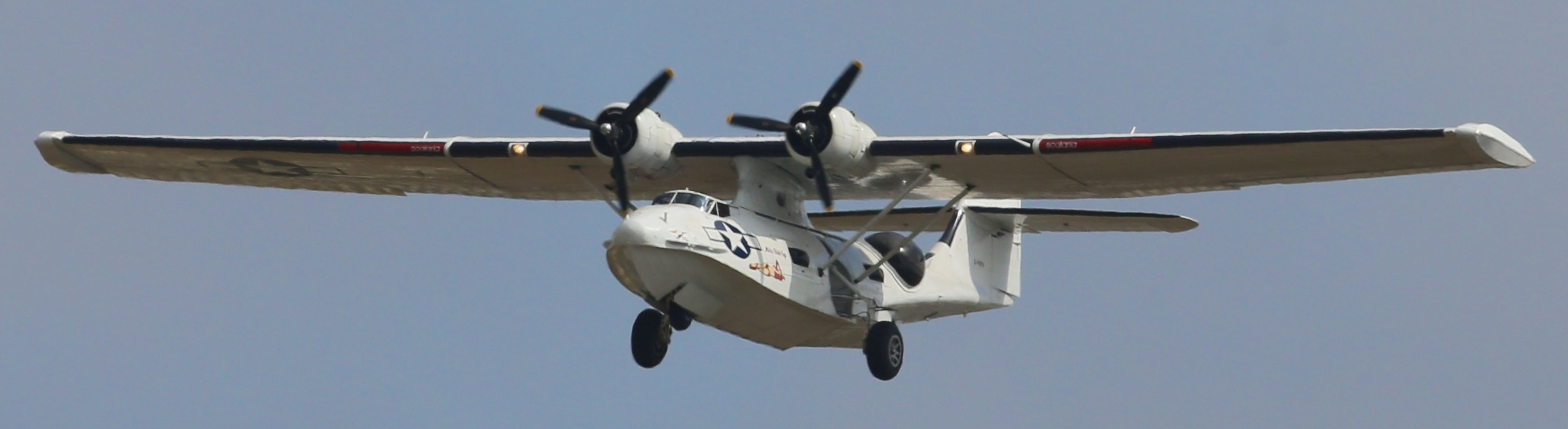
A maritime patrol Catalina, painted as bright as possible—white—to minimise visibility against the sky, still mainly appears dark. Yehudi lights match brightness better by generating light.

The use of Yehudi lights to camouflage aircraft by matching their luminance with the background sky was developed, in part, by the US Navy's Project Yehudi from 1943 onwards, following pioneering experiments in the Canadian diffused lighting camouflage project for ships early in the Second World War. A Canadian professor, Edmund Godfrey Burr, had serendipitously stumbled upon the principle when he saw an aircraft coming in to land over snow suddenly vanish. He realized that the reflected light had increased its brightness just enough to match the background sky.

The ships were fitted with ordinary projectors mounted on small platforms fixed to their sides, with the projectors pointing inwards at the ship's side. The brightness was adjusted to match the brightness of the sky. The Canadian experiment showed that such counter-illumination camouflage was possible, arousing interest in both Britain and America, but the equipment was cumbersome and fragile, and neither the Royal Canadian Navy nor their allies brought it into production.

== Active camouflage in animals ==
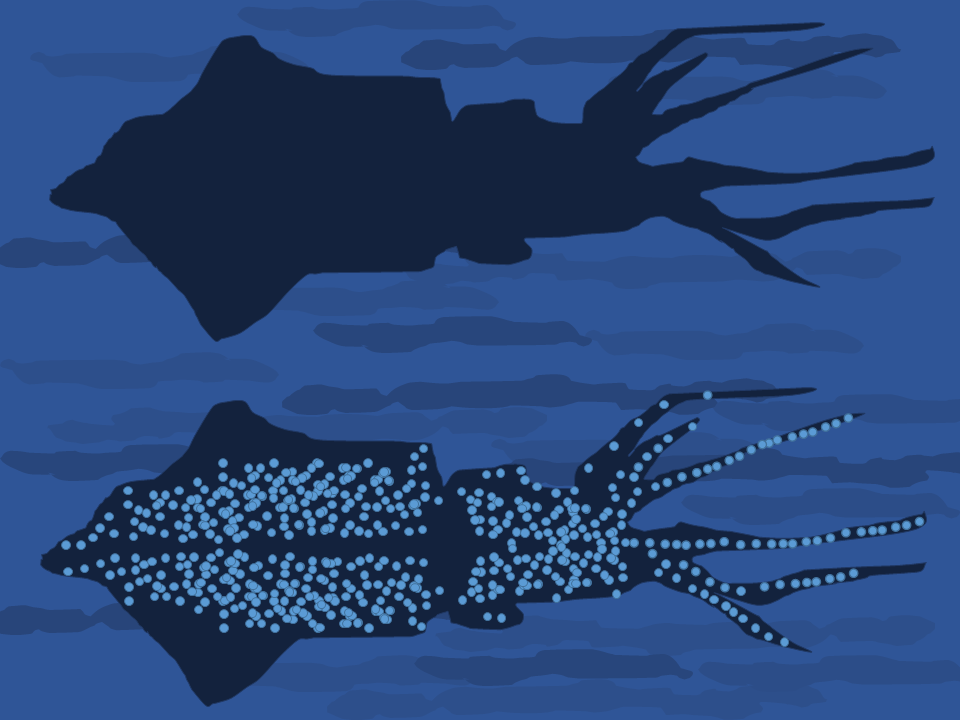
The principle of counter-illumination camouflage in squid. When seen from below by a predator, the animal's light helps to match its brightness and colour to the sea surface.

An equivalent active camouflage strategy, known to zoologists as counter-illumination, is used by many marine organisms, including fish, shrimps, and cephalopods such as the midwater squid, Abralia veranyi. The underside is covered with small photophores, organs that produce light. The squid varies the intensity of the light according to the brightness of the sea surface far above, providing effective camouflage by painting out the animal's silhouette with light.

== US Navy research project ==
=== Goal ===
Yehudi lights were developed by the US Navy to help counter the "menace" of German submarines to Allied shipping in the North Atlantic. The United States Army Air Force's Director Of Technical Services (DTS) asked the camouflage section of the National Defence Research Committee (NDRC) to develop a camouflage method that would allow a radar-equipped, sea-search aircraft to approach a surfaced submarine to within 30 seconds' flight time before being seen. This was to enable the aircraft to drop its depth charges before the submarine could dive.

British researchers had found that the amount of electrical power required to camouflage an aircraft's underside in daylight was prohibitive; and that externally mounted light projectors (following the Canadian approach) unacceptably disturbed the aircraft's aerodynamics.

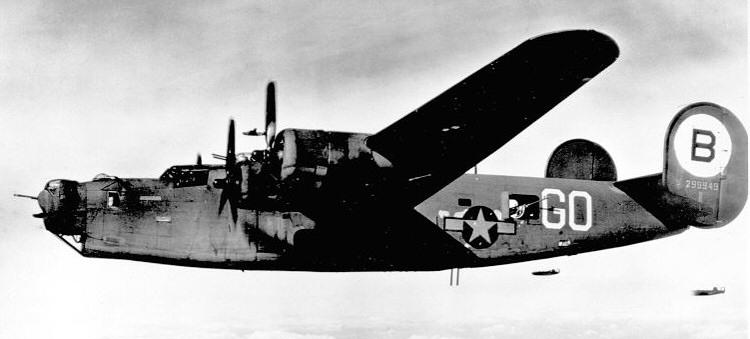
Yehudi lights were tested in B-24 Liberators from 1943.

The DTS, and through him the NDRC, were informed, in line with the Canadian findings, that even a white aircraft would normally appear dark against the sky. They were further told that while "floodlighting" the aircraft (in the manner of diffused lighting camouflage for ships) could in theory make it bright enough to match its background, that would require an impossibly large amount of electrical power: but a less power-hungry option was available, namely to use forward-facing lights, and to require the aircraft to fly within 3 degrees of the line directly towards the submarine, so that only its counter-illuminated front would face the enemy.

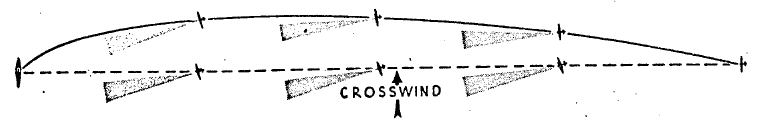
Yehudi Lights flight path in crosswind to keep 3 degree wide cones of light from nose pointing straight at the enemy

Pilots noted that if they chose a straight-line heading to compensate for a crosswind, the nose of the plane would not point directly at the enemy, but could be, say, 20 degrees off. Since making the beams bright enough at such a wide angle was impracticable, pilots were instructed to keep the nose pointed directly towards the target at all times, resulting in a curving approach path.

The NDRC estimated that lights could be spaced up to about 4 feet (1.2 m) apart without becoming visible as individual objects at a distance of 2 miles (3.2 km). On this basis, it calculated that a large aircraft like a B-24 Liberator bomber could be camouflaged against the sky for a power consumption of under 500 watts. The key technology investigated under Yehudi was therefore the use of forward-facing lights to anti-submarine and attack aircraft.

=== Ground prototyping ===
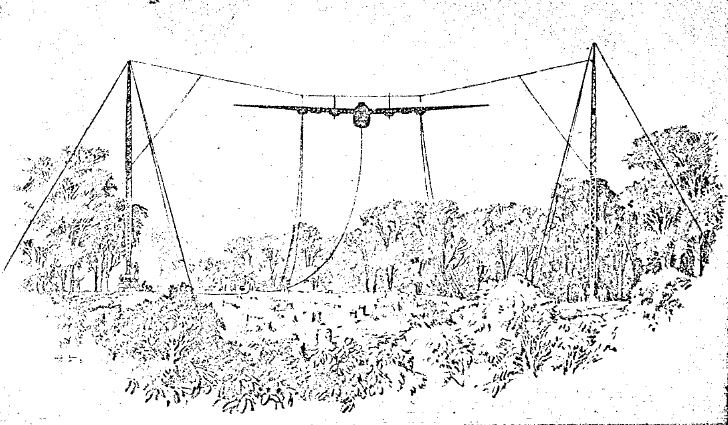
Yehudi Lights plywood prototype created in the winter of 1943 to demonstrate the concept of counter-illumination using forward-pointing lights on a B-24 Liberator.

To improve confidence in the approach, the project made a prototype in the form of a counter-illuminated plywood silhouette of a Liberator at life size, suspended from towers 100 feet (30 m) at a point where it could be seen from a point a little above sea level 2 miles (3.2 km) away across Oyster Bay, Long Island, so that it was seen mainly over water as a sea search aircraft would be from a submarine's conning tower. It was fitted with sealed beam lamps made by General Electric.

The lamps had reflectors to give them a narrow beam of 3 degrees horizontally, 6 degrees vertically, to minimise power consumption for the required brightness. The lamps' brightness was controllable with a variable resistor. During a test in the winter of 1943, selecting a day when the visibility was above 2 miles (3.2 km) and the wind not so strong as to destroy the prototype, the observers could clearly see the 1 inch (2.5 cm) thick cables used to hold up the model, but the silhouette itself was "completely invisible" with the lamps correctly adjusted.

=== Aircraft trials ===
The Yehudi project therefore used forward-pointing lamps mounted in the aircraft's nose and the leading edges of the wings, or suspended beneath the wings, their brightness controlled by a circuit containing a pair of photocells to match the brightness of the sky. One photocell pointed at the sky, the other at an auxiliary lamp; the circuit adjusted lamp brightness to make the output from the two photocells equal. It was trialled in Liberators, Avenger torpedo bombers and a Navy glide bomb from 1943 to 1945.

By directing the light forwards towards an observer (rather than towards the aircraft's skin), the system provided effective and efficient counter-illumination camouflage, more like that of marine animals such as the firefly squid than the Canadian diffused lighting approach. The system never entered active service.

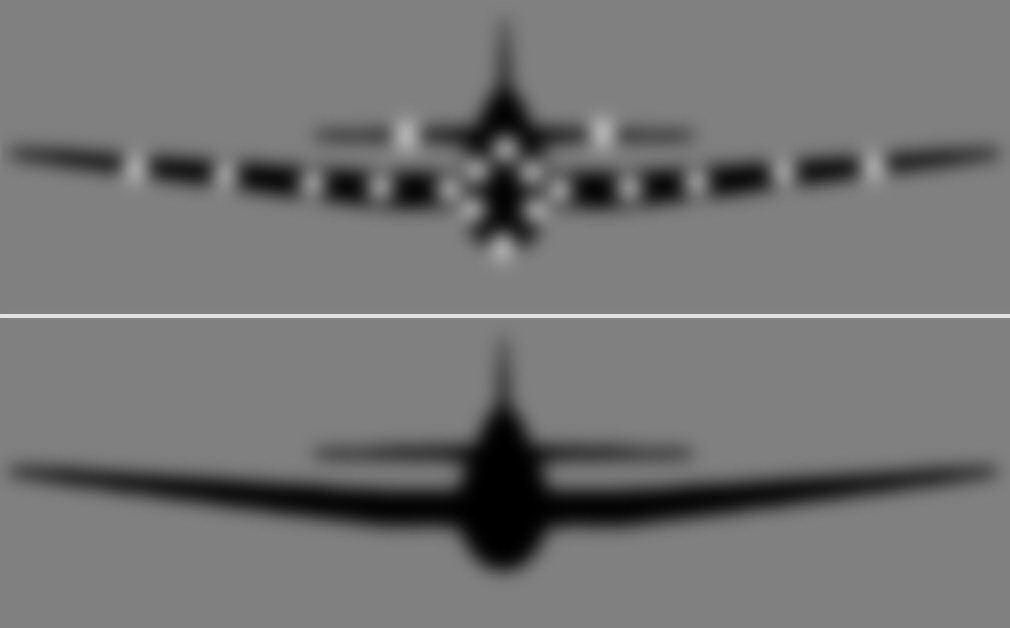
Yehudi Lights raise the average brightness of a Grumman Avenger from a dark shape to the same as the sky.

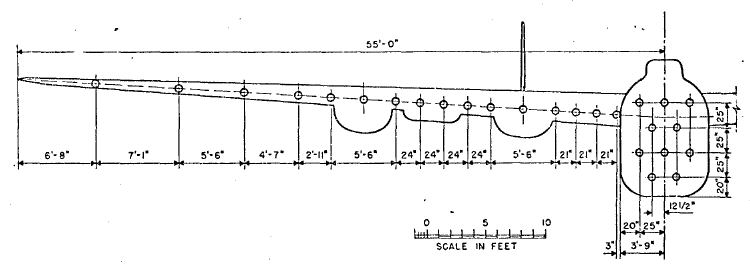
Yehudi Lights plan for counter-illumination camouflage of a B-24 Liberator, showing lights spaced along leading edges and front of fuselage

=== Results ===
In 1945 a Grumman Avenger with Yehudi lights got within 3,000 yards (2.7 km) of a ship before being sighted, when under the same conditions an uncamouflaged plane was detected at a range of about 12 miles (21,000 yd; 19 km). It was noted at the time that this would force the enemy either to give up radar silence, making submarines easy to locate but harder to approach, or for observers to use binoculars continually. Since 8x binoculars at the time had a field of view of only 5 degrees, whereas enemy submarines at the surface kept watch with three observers each assigned a 120 degree arc, the camouflage was considered effective.

== Later developments ==
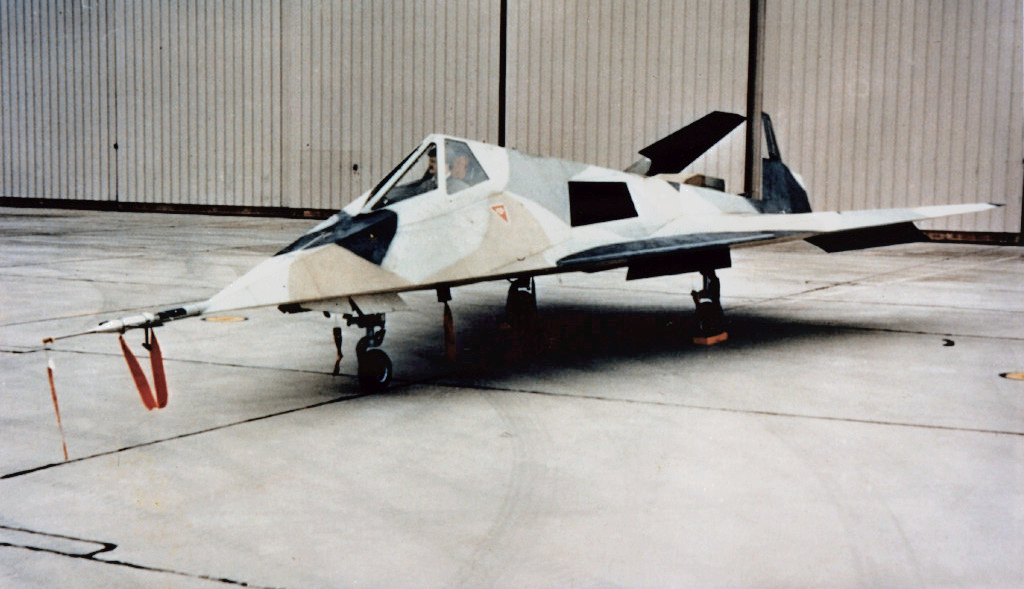
A prototype Have Blue stealth fighter, c. 1977, featuring both disruptive coloration and a faceted design that minimised its radar cross-section, but no Yehudi lights

The ability to approach a target unseen was rendered obsolete by advances in radar in the 1940s and 1950s. Since the development of stealth technology, Yehudi lights have attracted renewed interest, first in 1973 when McDonnell Douglas researched a "Quiet Attack" aircraft for the Office of Naval Research, modifying the F-4 Phantom with Yehudi lights on its underside, and later in the 1970s when Lockheed Martin's Skunk Works was contracted to develop a stealth aircraft prototype Have Blue, which helped to guide the development of the F-117A stealth attack aircraft and the B-2 stealth bomber.

The Have Blue prototype was disruptively camouflaged to disguise its shape from casual onlookers, as well as being constructed of angled facets to reduce its radar cross-section. The use of any form of active camouflage, whether Yehudi lights or microwave emissions, was rejected.

== See also ==
- Index of aviation articles
- Active camouflage
