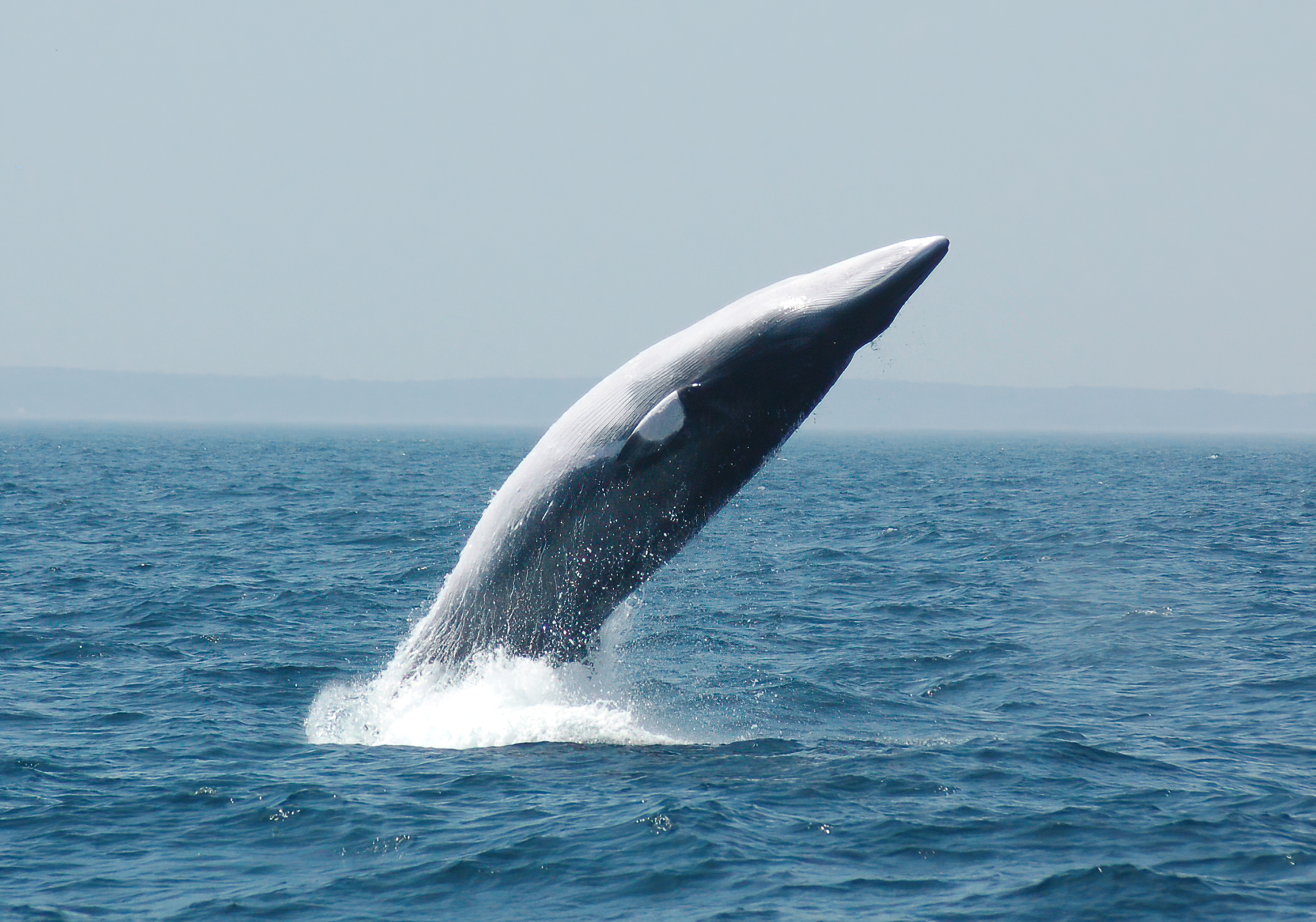
- Common minke whale breaching off the Stellwagen Bank National Marine Sanctuary
- Size compared to an average human

Conservation status
- Least Concern (IUCN 3.1)

- Secure (NatureServe)
- CITES Appendix I (Note: Except population of West Greenland, which is included in Appendix II.)

Scientific classification
- Kingdom: Animalia
- Phylum: Chordata
- Class: Mammalia
- Order: Artiodactyla
- Infraorder: Cetacea
- Family: Balaenopteridae
- Genus: Balaenoptera
- Species complex: Minke whale species complex
- Species: B. acutorostrata

Binomial name
- Balaenoptera acutorostrata Lacépède, 1804

Subspecies
- B. a. acutorostrata; B. a. scammoni; B. a. ssp. (Note: B. a. acutorostrata is the North Atlantic form; B. a. scammoni (or B. a . davidsoni) is the North Pacific form; the dwarf southern hemisphere form is unnamed)
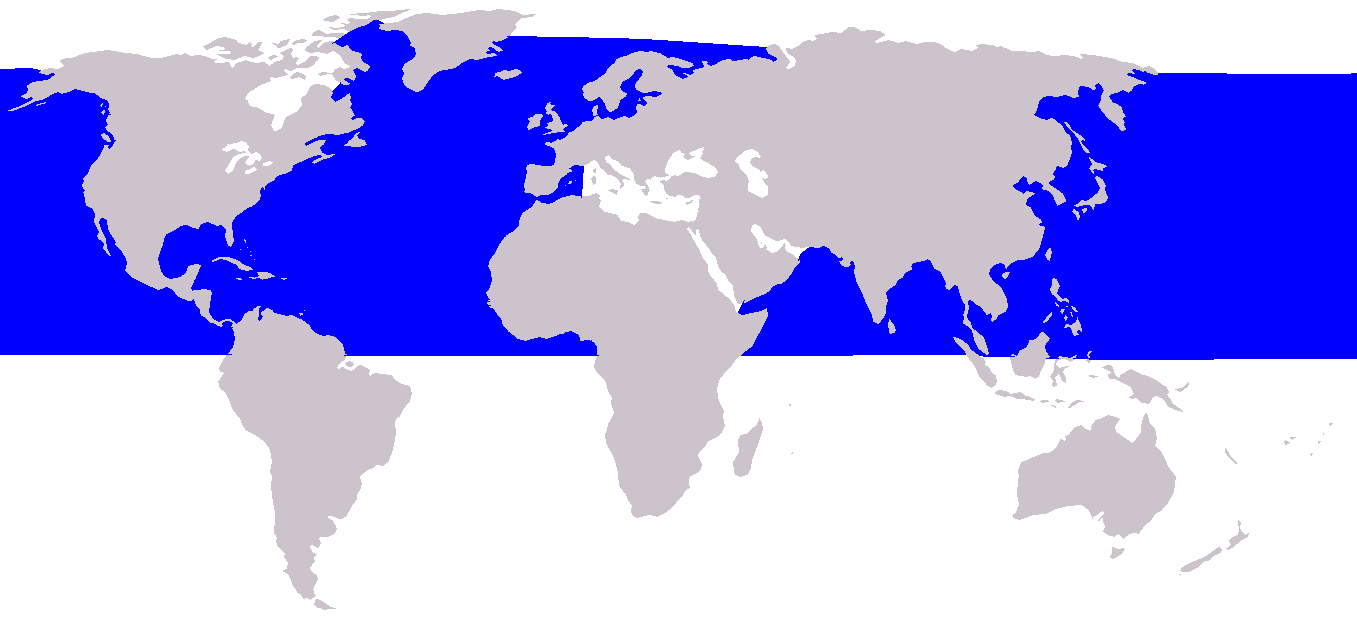
- Common minke whale range
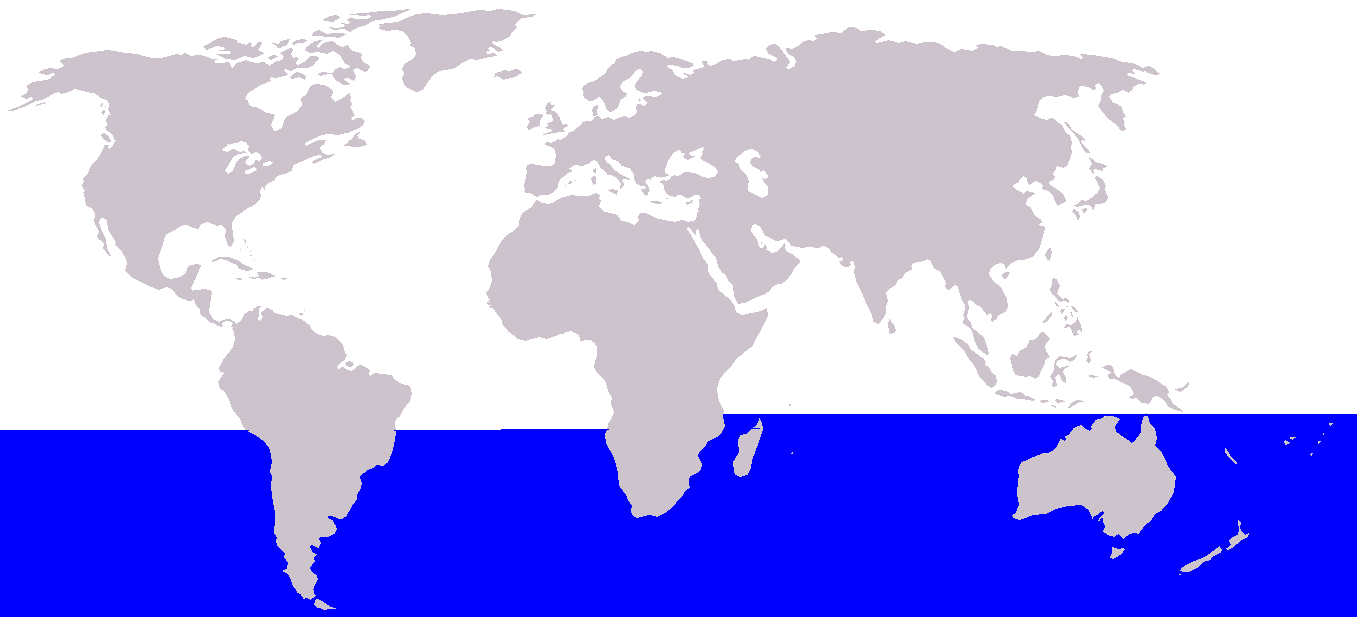
- Dwarf minke whale range

Synonyms
- Balaena rostrata Fabricius, 1780; Rorqualus boops F. Cuvier, 1836; Balaena minima Rapp, 1837; Balaenoptera eschrichtii Rasch, 1845; Pterobalaena minor Eschricht, 1849; Agaphelus gibbosus Cope, 1868; Balaenoptera davidsoni Scammon, 1872; Sibbaldius mondinii Capellini, 1877

= Common minke whale =

Common minke whale Temporal range: Pliocene – Recent 4.7–0 Ma

Species of mammal

The common minke whale or northern minke whale (Balaenoptera acutorostrata) is a species of minke whale within the suborder of baleen whales.

It is the smallest species of the rorquals and the second smallest species of baleen whale. Although first ignored by whalers due to its small size and low oil yield, it began to be exploited by various countries beginning in the early 20th century. As other species declined, larger numbers of common minke whales were caught, largely for their meat. It is now one of the primary targets of the whaling industry. There is a dwarf form in the Southern Hemisphere.

This species is known in the fossil record from the Pliocene epoch to the Quaternary period (age range: 4.7 million years ago to present day).

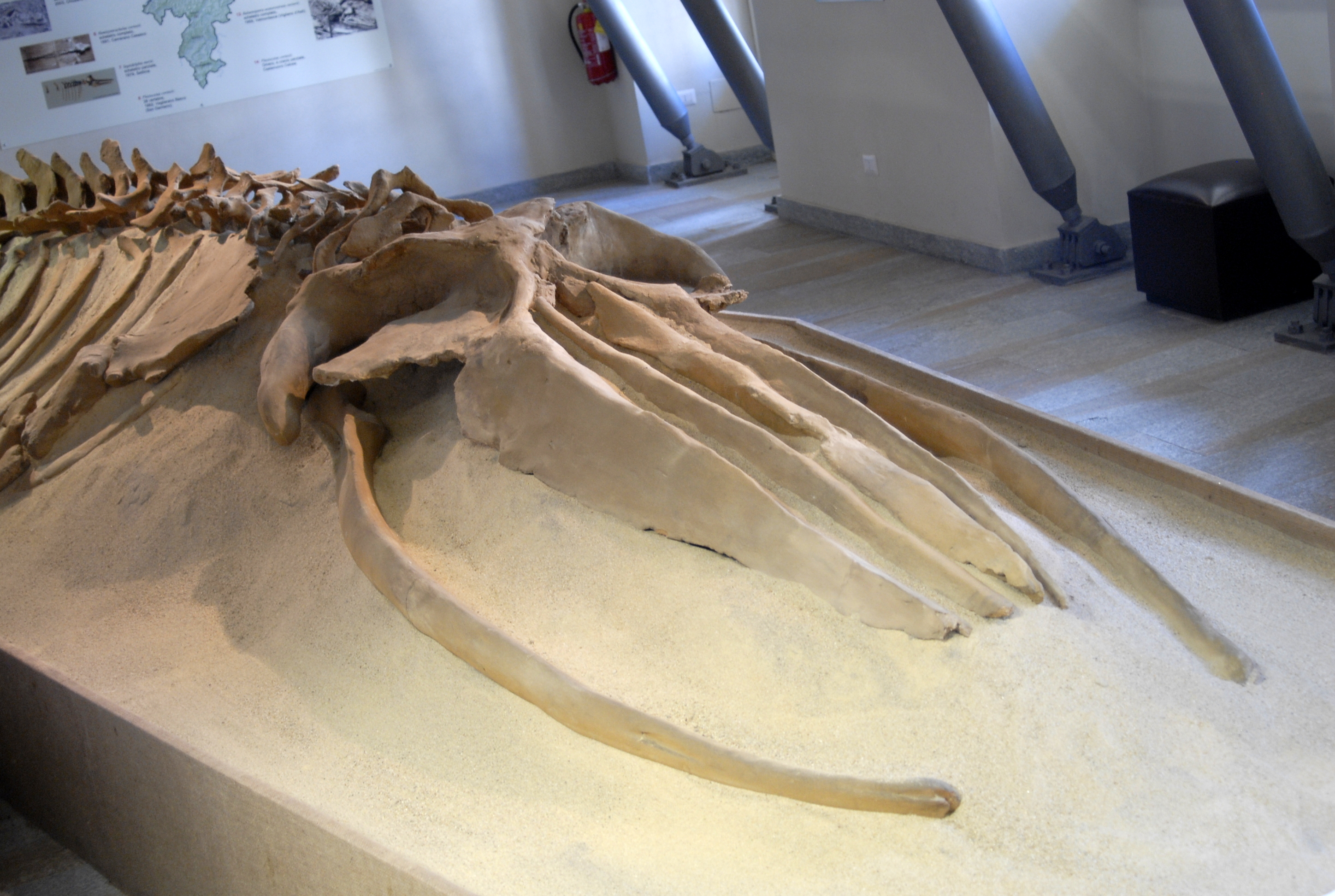
Fossil of Balaenoptera acutorostrata cuvieri from Pliocene of Italy

== Vernacular names ==
The origins of the species' common name are obscure. One of the first references to the name came in Henrik Johan Bull's account of his 1893–95 voyage to the Antarctic, when he mentioned catching a small whale "called in the Arctic language a Mencke whale, after a German who accompanied Mr. Foyn on some of his voyages." According to the British writer John Guille Millais (The mammals of Great Britain and Ireland, 1906, vol. 3, p. 279), "Minkie was a Norwegian seaman who was always calling 'Hval' at whatever backfin he saw. He is now regarded as the type of the 'tenderfoot' at sea. Norwegians often refer to any small whale with some contempt or amusement as a 'Minkie' or 'Minkie's hval'." The American marine biologist and painter Richard Ellis, citing the Norwegian scientist Age Jonsgård, stated "that Meincke was a German laborer working for Svend Foyn, inventor of the grenade harpoon. Meincke 'one day mistook a school of this whale species for blue whales.... most probably he made this mistake during Foyn's whaling operations in the Varanger Fjord between 1868 and 1885."

It has formerly been known as the little piked whale, the lesser or least rorqual, and the sharp-headed finner. American whalemen in the 19th century simply thought of them as "young finbacks" or a "Finback's calf", apparently under the impression that they were juveniles of their larger relative, the fin whale. They were also called zwergwal (German: "dwarf whale") or vågehval (Norwegian: "bay whale"). In Japan they are called koiwashi-kujira ("little sardine whale") or minku-kujira ("minke whale"). In Greenland they are known by the Danish name sildepisker ("herring thresher"). In Spanish it is known as Rorcual aliblanco (Whitewing Rorcual), Ballena minke común (Common Minke whale) or Ballena enana (Dwarf whale).

== Taxonomy ==
=== History ===
Otto Fabricius, in his Fauna Groenlandica (1780), was the first to describe the minke, noting its small size and white baleen – but he described it erroneously under the name Balaena rostrata (the taxonomic designation for the beaked whale). In 1804, Baron de Lacepede named it Balaenoptera acuto-rostrata, basing his description partly on the stranding of a 4.26 m (14.0 ft) juvenile female near Cherbourg, France in 1791.

In 1872, the American whaleman and naturalist Charles Melville Scammon described and named Balaenoptera davidsoni, after an 8.3 m (27 ft) pregnant female that was found dead on the north shore of Admiralty Inlet in October 1870 in then Washington Territory (now Washington state) and towed into Port Townsend Bay by Italian fisherman, who flensed it on the beach. Scammon mentioned its "dwarfish size", "pointed head", "falcated dorsal fin", and the "white band" on its "inordinately small, pointed pectorals". In 1877, the Italian geologist and paleontologist Giovanni Capellini described and named Sibbaldius mondini from a juvenile specimen that was captured off Italy in 1771. Both were later synonymized with B. acutorostrata.

A smaller, Southern Hemisphere form of minke whale with white-banded flippers was first described in separate studies by Peter Best (1985) and Peter Arnold, Helene Marsh, and George Heinsohn (1987), though a white-flippered form in the Southern Hemisphere had been noted earlier. The former described a "diminutive form" based on specimens caught off Durban, South Africa, while the latter named a "dwarf form" based on specimens and sightings from Australia. This unnamed subspecies has a prominent white flipper and shoulder blaze and a dark throat patch, whereas what was called the "dark-shouldered" or "ordinary" form of minke whale (now known as a separate species, the Antarctic minke whale, B. bonaerensis) lacked these contrasting markings.

Until recently, all minke whales were considered a single species. However, the common minke whale was recognized as a separate species from the Antarctic minke whale based on mitochondrial DNA testing. This testing also confirmed that the Antarctic minke whale is the closest relative of the common minke whale, thus confirming the validity of the minke whale clade.

=== Divergence ===
Common and Antarctic minke whales diverged from each other in the Southern Hemisphere 4.7 million years ago, during a prolonged period of global warming in the early Pliocene which disrupted the Antarctic Circumpolar Current and created local pockets of upwelling, facilitating speciation by fragmenting populations. The radiation of common minke whales into the Northern Hemisphere occurred rapidly about 1.5 million years ago during a period of cooling in the Pleistocene.

=== Hybrids ===
There have been two confirmed hybrids between common and Antarctic minke whales. Both were caught in the northeastern North Atlantic by Norwegian whaling vessels. The first, an 8.25 m (27.1 ft) female taken off western Spitsbergen (78°02′N 11°43′E) on 20 June 2007, was the result of a pairing between a female Antarctic minke and a male common minke. The second, a pregnant female taken off northwestern Spitsbergen (79°45′N 9°32′E) on 1 July 2010, on the other hand, had a common minke mother and an Antarctic minke father. Her female fetus, in turn, was fathered by a North Atlantic common minke, demonstrating that back-crossing is possible between hybrids of the two species.

== Description ==
=== Size ===
Skeleton of the Common minke whale

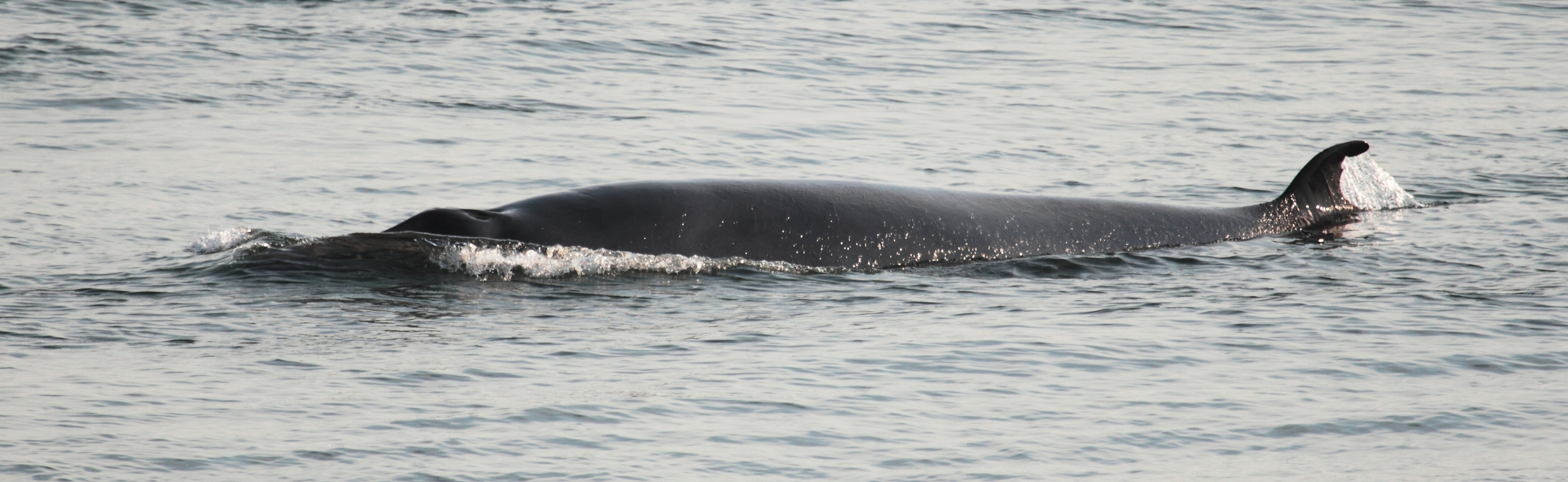
Minke whale in the Saguenay–St. Lawrence Marine Park, showing the blowholes and dorsal fin at the same time

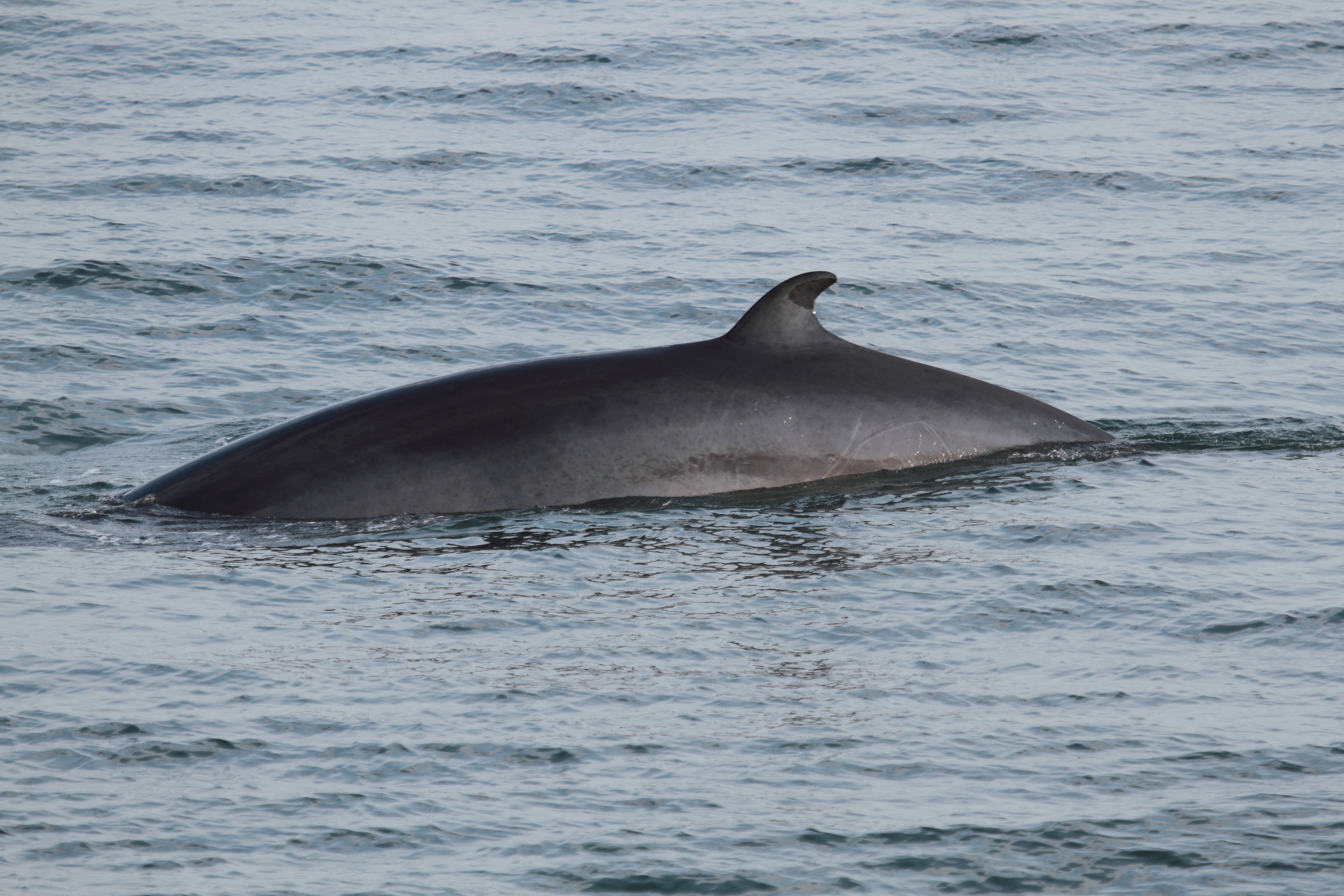
Minke whale in the Gulf of St. Lawrence showing scars perhaps caused by killer whales

The common minke whale is the smallest of the rorquals, and one of the smallest baleen whales (second smallest only to the Pygmy right whale). In the North Atlantic, Norwegian whaling vessels in 1940 allegedly caught individuals of up to 10.7 m (35 ft) in length, but they were likely only measured visually in comparison to objects of known dimensions aboard the ships themselves – the longest caught in subsequent years were typically only up to 9.4–10.05 m (30.8–33.0 ft) in length. In the North Pacific, Soviet vessels operating out of the Kuril Islands claimed to have caught two males of 12.2 (40 ft) and 12 m (39 ft) and a female of 10.7 m (35 ft) – the first two were landed in 1951, the third in 1960. These likely represent undersized sei whales, part of the massive misreporting of whaling data by the Soviet Union in the North Pacific and elsewhere. The maximum weight recognized by scholars is 9.2 t (10.1 short tons).

The longest measured by Icelandic scientists were an 8.7 m (29 ft) male and a 9 m (30 ft) female, while the longest caught by the Japanese in the western North Pacific were 8.5 m (28 ft) males and a 9.1 m (30 ft) female – the latter caught off eastern Hokkaido in 1977. For the dwarf form, the longest reported are a 7.62 m (25.0 ft) male caught in May 1973 and a 7.77 (25.5 ft) female caught in May 1970, both taken off South Africa.

Males caught in the western North Pacific and weighed whole on a truck scale averaged between 2.85 and 4.23 metric tons (3.14 and 4.66 short tons) (range: 0.86 to 6.36 metric tons, 0.95 to 7.01 short tons), while females averaged between 1.93 and 3.63 metric tons (2.13 and 4.00 short tons) (range: 0.84 to 8.35 metric tons, 0.93 to 9.20 short tons).

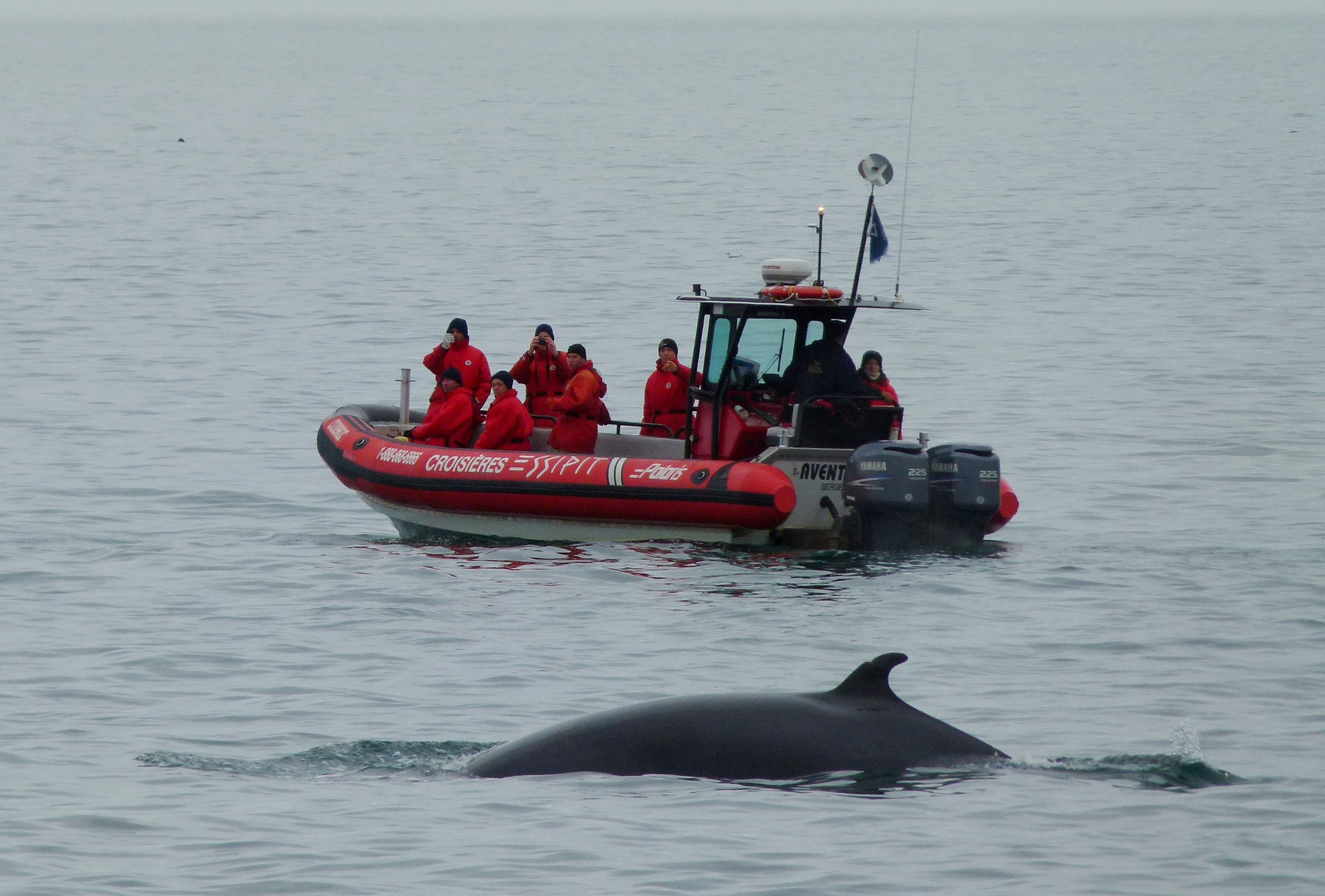
Minke whale's size relative to a Zodiac off Tadoussac

At sexual maturity, males and females in the North Atlantic average between 6.16–6.75 m (20.2–22.1 ft) and 6.03–7.15 m (19.8–23.5 ft), while in the North Pacific they average between 6.3–6.8 m (21–22 ft) and 7.1–7.3 m (23–24 ft). At physical maturity, males and females in the North Atlantic average between 7.9–8.17 m (25.9–26.8 ft) and 8.42–8.5 m (27.6–27.9 ft), while in the North Pacific they are slightly smaller, averaging only 7.5 and 8 m (25 and 26 ft), respectively. At birth, they are estimated to be 2.5–2.8 m (8 ft 2 in – 9 ft 2 in) in length and weigh 150–300 kg (330–660 lb). They are thought to be weaned at about 4.57 m (15.0 ft) in length. For the dwarf form, they are thought to reach sexual maturity at around 6.2 m (20 ft) for females and 6 m (20 ft) for males and are estimated to be about 2 m (6.6 ft) at birth.

=== Appearance ===
==== Northern form ====
Common minke whales are among the most robust members of their genus, the greatest height of their body being one-fifth their total length. They have a narrow, pointed, triangular rostrum with a low splashguard. Their prominent, upright, falcate dorsal fin averages about 30 cm (12 in) in height – range 7 to 77 cm (2.8 to 30.3 in) – and is set about two-thirds the way along the back. They are dark gray dorsally and clean white ventrally. The lower jaw projects beyond the upper jaw and is dark gray on both sides – though, like the dwarf form, it can have a white mandible blaze at the rear corner of the right lower jaw. An indistinct light gray rostral saddle may be present, and a few individuals can have pale, thin blowhole streaks trailing from the blowholes. A thin, light gray, forward-directed chevron, called the shoulder streak, lies between the pectoral fins. Two light gray to whitish swaths, called the thorax and flank patches, join ventrally in the mid-lateral region, with the former the brighter of the two. The pectoral fins are relatively small, averaging about 73 cm (29 in) in length with a maximum of 1.38 m (4 ft 6 in). They have a transverse, white band on their outer margins, which is the most distinguishing feature of the species. In most individuals (about 94% in the western North Pacific) it is a clear white band, but in a minority of cases (about 6%) it only forms an obscure white band – about 29% of the individuals sampled from the Sea of Japan had this type of flipper band. The smooth-sided flukes average about 2 m (6 ft 7 in) in width and can be nearly 3 m (9.8 ft) wide. They are light gray or white ventrally and bordered by dark gray. The baleen plates, which number about 230 to 360 pairs and average about 20 by 10 cm (7.9 by 3.9 in), are creamy white with a fine white fringe – a small percentage in the western North Pacific (mainly larger individuals) have a thin black band along the outer margin. They possess 50 to 70 thin ventral pleats, which only extend about 47 percent of the body length – among the shortest relative to body length among the rorquals, second only to the sei whale.

==== Dwarf form ====
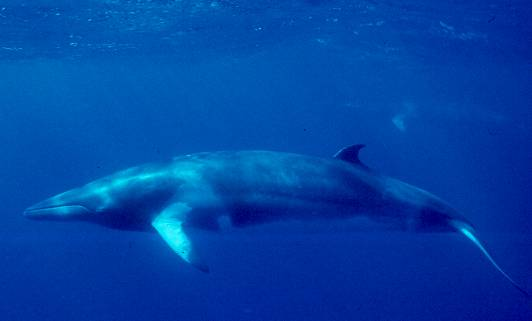
Dwarf minke whale showing prominent white flipper and shoulder blazes, the light gray thorax patch, and the various dark gray dorsal fields

The dwarf minke whale has similar proportions to the northern form, with an upright, hooked dorsal fin set about two-thirds the way along the back that is up to 32 to 34 cm (13 to 13 in) in height. It has 55 to 67 ventral grooves. Its baleen – 18 to 20 cm (7.1 to 7.9 in) in length – is mostly white, with up to 45 per cent of the posterior plates shading from black to dusky gray along their outer margins.

The dwarf form has the most complex coloration of any baleen whale. Dark gray fields and capes alternate with light gray and white blazes, patches, and streaks. The dark gray spinal field lies above an ivory white ventral field. This spinal field extends down into a nape field, which separates a light gray rostral saddle and a light gray, triangular, usually forwardly peaked thorax patch. The nape field, in turn, extends even further down into a dark throat patch, which reaches down to the ventral pleats and extends back to the front of the pectoral fins. Further back the spinal field extends into a dark thorax field, which usually forms an inverted triangle between the thorax patch and the light gray flank patch. This flank patch can be separated into an anterior and posterior flank patch by a dark triangular or even wave-like flank infill. Finally, the dark peduncle field covers the posterior portion of the caudal peduncle to the tips of the dorsal side of the flukes, which are white ventrally and thinly bordered by dark gray.

The most prominent features on the dwarf minke whale are the white flipper and shoulder blazes. The former covers the proximal two-thirds of the pectoral fin and continues along its leading edge, while the latter connects to the thorax patch above. A variably sized, dark oval auxiliary patch (formerly called a "flipper oval") lies behind the pectoral fin, often appearing to merge with the dark gray distal flipper patch, which occupies the distal third of the pectoral fin. This auxiliary patch is often completely separated from the thorax patch by the white of the shoulder blaze and a vertical extension of the ventral field, but can also narrowly or even broadly attach to it. A mandible blaze usually covers the posterior third of the right lower jaw, while the left side is normally dark gray. Similarly, a white eye blaze is usually present on the right side, but rarely on the left. The rostral saddle likewise shows asymmetrical coloration, extending further on the right side than on the left and having a more well defined posterior right margin; the left, meanwhile, often has a diffuse posterior margin. A white peduncle blaze extends up from the ventral field, being bordered on each side by light gray double caudal chevrons, which extend down from the peduncle field and flank patch, respectively.

A variably shaped, thin, light gray line, called the nape streak (analogous to the "shoulder streak" or "chevron" of the northern form), extends laterally down the back between the pectoral fins. It can point forward, backwards or form a straight line; this variability can help to identify individual whales. A pair of light gray blowhole streaks extend posteriorly behind the blowholes, often curving to the left – the left more strongly than the right. Occasionally fine ear stripes may be present behind the opening of the auditory meatus, while dark or light speckling or streaking can occur along the flanks as well as what are called tiger stripes – "parallel, dark, usually vertical stripes".

Like Bryde's whale (and occasionally blue and fin whales), dwarf minkes can exhibit auxiliary ridges on either side of the central ridge of the rostrum.

== Distribution ==
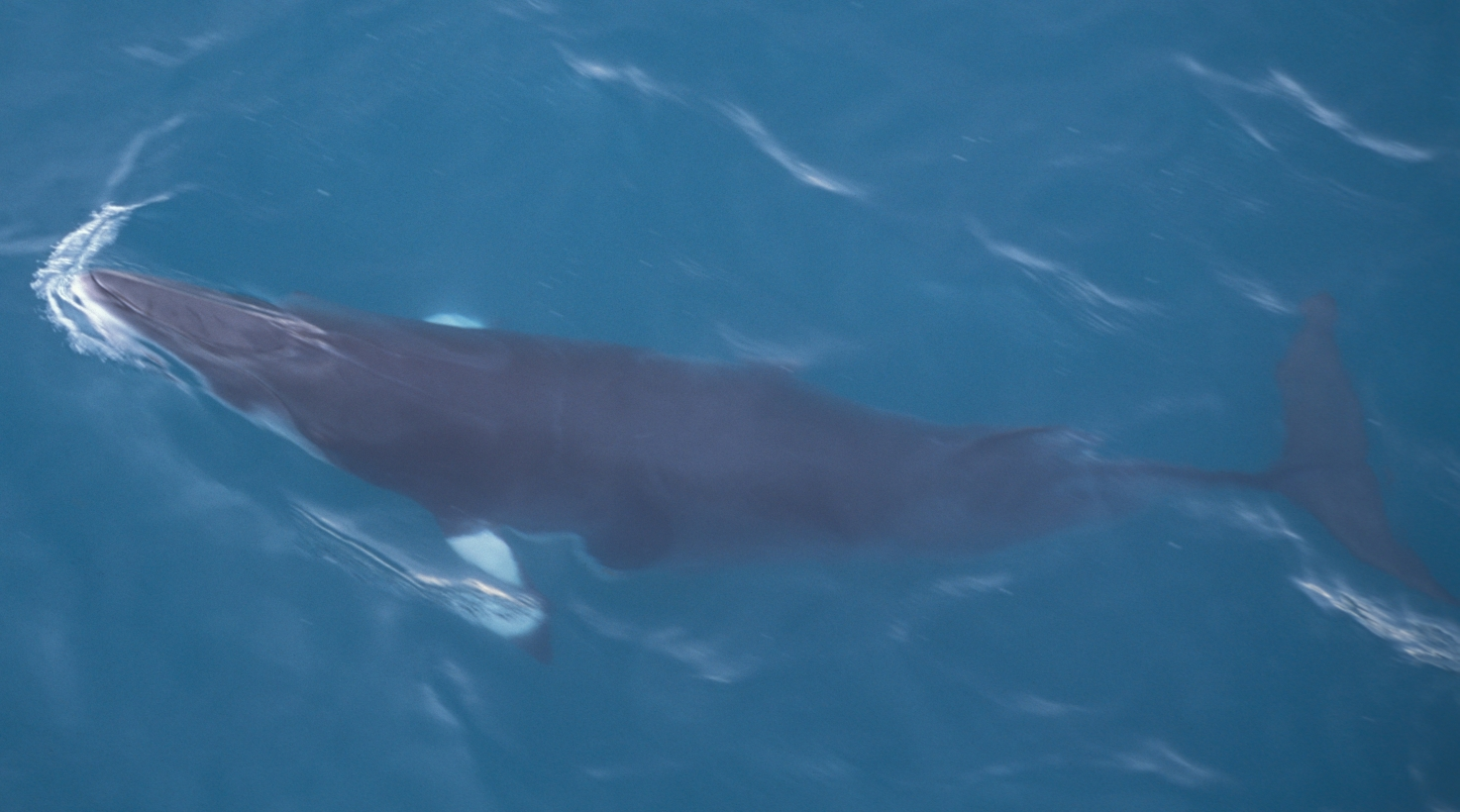
View of a common minke whale underwater, showing the diagnostic white flipper band

There are approximately 209,800 common minke whales worldwide. They have a disjointed distribution. In the North Atlantic, they occur as far north as Baffin Bay, Svalbard, Franz Josef Land, and Novaya Zemlya and as far south as 40°N (New Jersey) and the Hebrides and central North Sea during summer. There are a few records from Hudson Bay (James Bay in 1986 and Button Bay in 1990), and they have also been observed occasionally in Hudson Strait and Ungava Bay. They have been recorded off Madeira and occur year-round off the Canary Islands. There are occasional sightings and strandings off Spain and Portugal, western Sahara, Mauritania, and Senegal. It is rare off the Azores and a vagrant in the Gulf of Mexico and the Mediterranean Sea, with a few records from the Black Sea (1880 and 1926). During the winter it has been recorded off Bermuda, the Bahamas, the Antilles, the east coast of the United States south of 40°N, and in the southeastern North Atlantic between 10°40'N and 19°35'N and 22°W and 20°05'W. In the western and central North Pacific, they range from Hawaii, the Mariana Islands, the East China Sea, the Yellow Sea and the Sea of Japan in the south to the Sea of Okhotsk and Bering and Chukchi Seas in the north. In the eastern North Pacific, they occur in the Gulf of Alaska south along the entire west coast of North America (including the U.S. states of Alaska, Washington, Oregon, and California and the Canadian province of British Columbia) down to Baja California and into the Gulf of California. During winter, they've been acoustically recorded mainly between 15° and 35°N in the eastern and central North Pacific.

The dwarf form has been recorded off Brazil (June to February, including the states of Maranhão, Paraíba, Bahía, Espírito Santo, Rio de Janeiro, São Paulo, Paraná, Santa Catarina, and Rio Grande do Sol) from 2°44'S to 33°35'S, Uruguay, Argentina, in the Beagle Channel and Goree Passage of southern Chile (February to April), off South Africa (May to August), Australia (March to December, including Western Australia, Victoria, New South Wales, and Queensland), New Zealand (March to August), New Caledonia, Vanuatu, Fiji, and as far south as the South Shetland Islands, Gerlache Strait, and the Bellingshausen Sea (69°25'S).

=== Population in North Atlantic ===
There are estimated to be over 180,000 common minke whales in the North Atlantic. Sighting surveys conducted in the Northeastern Atlantic between 1996 and 2001 resulted in an estimated abundance of 107,205 whales, with 43,835 in the Barents Sea region, 26,718 around Jan Mayen, 18,174 in the Greenland Sea and around the Svalbard archipelago, and 17,895 in the northern North Sea. There are an estimated 67,225 whales off Iceland. Based on an aerial survey performed in waters between northern Disko Island (70°45'N) and Cape Farewell (60°N) during August and September 2005, there are estimated to be 4,856 individuals (95% confidence interval (CV): 1,910-12,348) off Western Greenland; a ship-based survey made during September and October of the same year came up with a similar estimate of 4,479 (95% CI: 1,760-11,394). In the Gulf of St. Lawrence, line-transect aerial surveys done in August–September 1995 and July–August 1996 estimated there were 1,020 minke whales there, with about 75% of them on the North Shore shelf.

Estimates published in 2021 (based on 2014-2019 data) indicate that there are up to 150,000 individuals in Norwegian waters. Researchers at the Norwegian Institute of Marine Research say that these estimates are 50% higher than previous.

=== Population in North Pacific ===
Ship-based sighting surveys that covered the Okhotsk Sea during August 1989 and August–September 1990 and adjacent areas of the Northwest Pacific during July and August 1990 estimated there were 25,049 (95% CI: 13,700-45,800) minke whales there, with 19,209 (95% CI: 10,100-36,600) in the Okhotsk Sea and 5,841 (95% CI: 2,800-12,000) in the Northwest Pacific. A sighting survey conducted in the central Bering Sea between July and August 1999 estimated there were 936 (95% CI: 473-1,852) individuals in those waters, while line-transect sighting surveys that cruised from the central Aleutian Islands east to the Kenai Peninsula from July–August 2001 – 2003 estimated there were 1,232 (95% CI: 646-2,346) whales in that area, with the majority of the sightings around the eastern Aleutian Islands, particularly in and around Seguam Pass and the Islands of Four Mountains; a few sightings were also made along the Alaska Peninsula and near Kodiak Island. In the coastal waters of British Columbia, there are estimated to be 475 (95% CI: 221-1,020) whales based on sightings from ship-based line-transect surveys made during the summers of 2004 and 2005.

=== Population in Southern Hemisphere ===
There are no population estimates for dwarf minke whales due to sighting surveys not being able to distinguish it from the much more common Antarctic minke whale.

=== Occurrence ===
Minke whales were individually identified using the shape of the dorsal fin and nicks along its edges, variations in lateral body pigmentation, and small oval scars in three separate study sites on the western coast of North America. These individuals showed strong small-scale site fidelity. A total of 55 whales were identified, 30 in the San Juan Islands of Washington state from 1980 to 1984, 17 in the Monterey Bay area of central California from 1984 to 1987, and eight in the Johnstone Strait area of British Columbia from 1981 to 1987 – although in the last region most were only photographed incidentally to the study of killer whales. The number of sightings per individual ranged from only one in one year to 37 over nine years, with 31 whales (56.4%) being sighted in at least two years and 12 (21.8%) being seen in at least five years. Most were seen exclusively or almost exclusively in one of three sub-regions in the San Juan Islands and one of two sub-regions in the Monterey Bay area.

In the San Juan Islands, 14 out of 18 whales were within their primary range on at least 94 per cent of sightings. Of the three sub-regions, Range A, northwest of Orcas Island, had the most stable constituency, with five individuals seen repeatedly over the study period, accounting for all but one of 88 sightings. Range B, east of San Juan Island, had the least stable constituency as well as the lowest number of sightings per year, while Range C, south and west of San Juan Island, had the greatest number of sightings and the greatest number of identified individuals every year. One whale, S4, was repeatedly and consistently found in Range B for three years, but was never seen there again after 1982; few sightings were made since then and all of these occurred in 1984, most of them involving three whales that were usually found in Range A (S8, S10, and S13). In Range C, five whales were seen there every year, while seven were only seen in a single year – most of the latter individuals were never encountered in any other part of the study site. There were also whales that showed no site fidelity at all, moving freely between the sub-regions. For example, whale S9, although only being sighted five times over four years, had sightings evenly divided between ranges B and C; whale S5, on the other hand, encountered 27 times over the course of eight years, was seen in more than one range in most years and moved around the three sub-regions more than any other whale.

In the Monterey Bay area, Range A was north of the deep-water canyon that runs into Carmel Bay, while Range B was south of that canyon. Individuals were sighted within one of the two ranges on at least 88 per cent of the sightings, with whales even being observed to turn around as they approached the border of their primary range and head back toward the middle of their range – this happened five times at the northern border and twice at the southern border of Range A, and six times at the northern border of Range B. Whales were sighted within 3 km (1.9 mi) of the coast, occasionally just outside the kelp, most of the time moving in a more or less straight line.

During a study conducted around the Isle of Mull, northwest Scotland, between 1990 and 1999 during the months of May to October, 66 minke whales were photo-identified based on the shape of the dorsal fin and distinctive notches and marks on it, body scars, and white oval scars – lateral body pigmentation was often not visible. Of these, 30 were seen at least twice, with 21 of them sighted in more than one year; one individual was identified 27 times over the course of ten years. During a similar study performed during whale watching cruises in the southern outer Moray Firth, northeast Scotland, between 2001 and 2007 from May to October, 34 individuals were photo-identified. Fourteen of them (41%) were sighted one or more times, while seven individuals (20%) were seen in one or more years. One whale was seen three times between 2002 and 2006; another four times between 2001 and 2006; and a third a total of eight times between 2001 and 2006.

In a photo-identification study of minke whales off Iceland conducted between 2001 and 2010, a total of 353 whales were individually identified: 292 in Faxaflói Bay, on the southwest coast, and 61 in Skjálfandi Bay, on the northeast coast. In Faxaflói Bay, 68 (23.3%) were resighted at least once, with 53 (18.2%) being resighted in two years, nine (3.1%) in three years, and six (2.1%) in four years. The majority in Skjálfandi was only sighted in one year, while ten (16.4%) were resighted at least once, four (6.6%) in two years, and six (9.8%) in three years or more. One whale, first photographed in Skjálfandi Bay in July 2002, moved repeatedly between the two study sites over a period of nearly ten years, sometimes being sighted in both areas in the same season.

In the St. Lawrence estuary, using dorsal fin shape and scars and lateral body pigmentation and scarring, a total of 209 minke whales were individually identified during the summer months between 1999 and 2004. Thirty-five were what were called "regular visitors", being sighted on at least 40 different days in four to six different years. Twenty-five showed strong small-scale site fidelity to either the Laurentian Channel Head or the Saguenay Fjord, with over three-quarters of their sightings occurring in one of these two areas. Off Nova Scotia, forty individuals were reliably identified using dorsal fin notches during the summer months (mainly July and August) between 1997 and 2008. Of these, fourteen (35%) were sighted on more than one day, while only five (12.5%) were seen in more than one year.

=== Migration and movements ===
Three minke whales tagged off Iceland showed large-scale movements. One tagged off the north coast on 20 August 2002 first moved northeast of Iceland on 31 October before heading south, reaching 56°N 27°W on 8 November. Another, tagged in Faxaflói Bay on 14 September 2004, turned south along the Reykjanes Ridge about two weeks later; its last signal was received on 8 October at about 50°N 34°W. The third traveled the greatest distance. After being tagged in Faxaflói Bay on 27 August 2004 its first signal wasn't received until 17 November, when it was over the Mid-Atlantic Ridge, 900 km (560 mi) west of northern Spain. Its next position was transmitted six days later, some 700 km (430 mi) to the south, around the Azores, while its last signal was received on 5 December along the Canary Current, 1,000 km (620 mi) northwest of the Cape Verde Islands. In all, it traveled 3,700 km (2,300 mi) from its tagging location in a little over 100 days.

In the eastern North Pacific, individually identified minke whales were found to make intra-annual movements between feeding areas. Two whales traveled from southern (April) to northern Vancouver Island (July), while one whale moved from the southwest coast of Vancouver Island (June) to its northern coast (July–September) and another from the central British Columbia coast (July) south to northern Vancouver Island (August–September). Two whales, including one of the two that had traveled from southern to northern Vancouver Island, moved from northern in June and July to southern Vancouver Island in September.

Four dwarf minke whales were attached with satellite tags off Lizard Island, on the Great Barrier Reef, in July 2013. All four followed the coastline south. Two stopped transmitting off southern Queensland, while the other two traveled west through the Bass Strait. The third soon stopped transmitting as well. The fourth ceased sending signals on 11 October, by which time it had reached 54°23'S, traveling some 6,000 km (3,700 mi) from its original tagging location.

== Biology ==
=== Reproduction ===
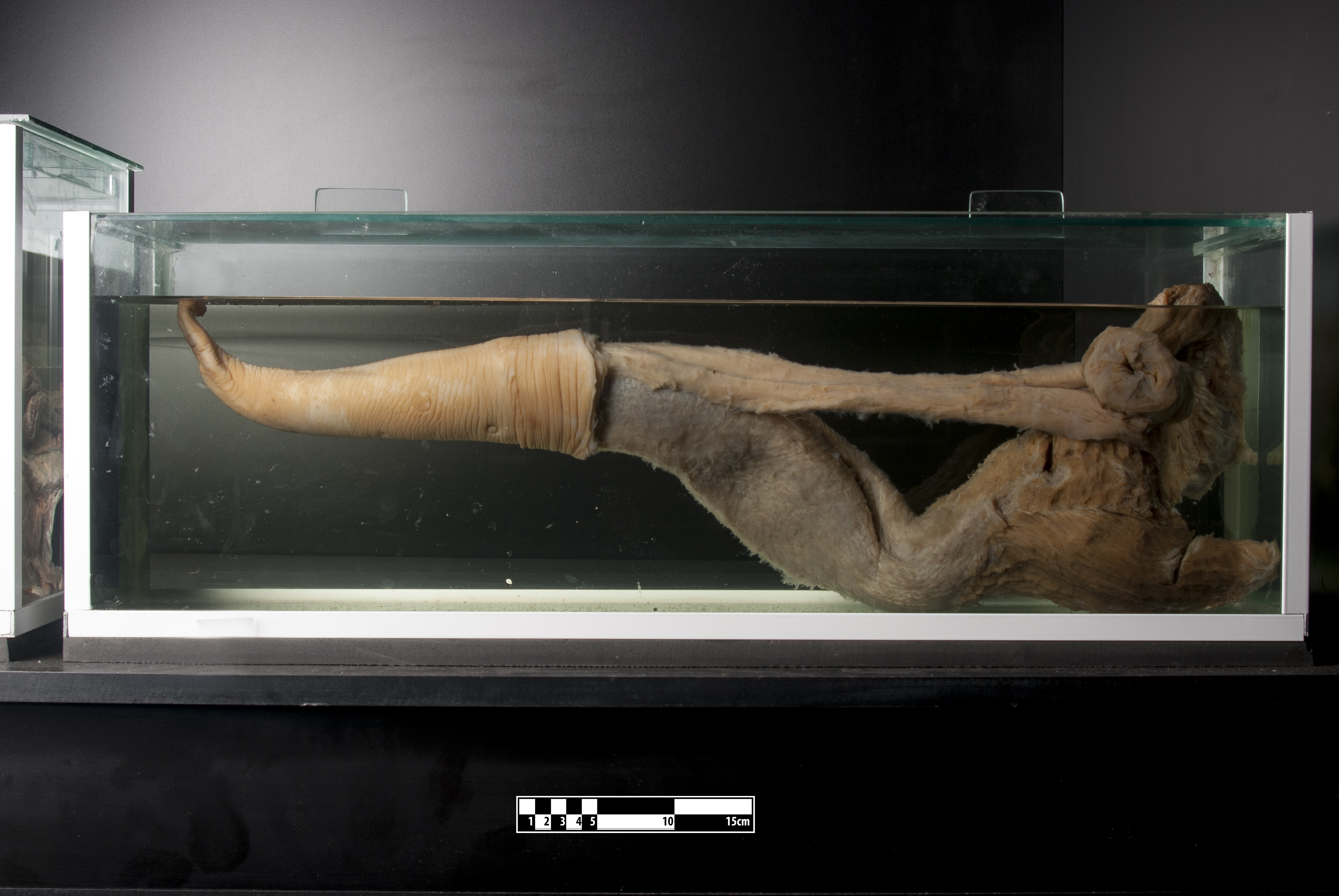
Minke whale penis

Common minke whales are sexually mature at about six to eight years of age for females and about six to seven years for males. Females are promiscuous. After a gestation period of 10 months, a single 2.6 m (8 ft 6 in) calf is born – only one out of 79 mature females during a study of minke whales off Iceland had twin fetuses, an 8.7 m (29 ft) female caught in July 2006 which had a 34 cm (13 in) male and a 32 cm (13 in) female. The calf is weaned after a period of six months. Peak conception is February in the North Atlantic, late February to mid-March for the "O stock", which migrates along the eastern coast of Japan to the Okhotsk Sea), and between October and November for the "J stock" (which occurs in the Yellow Sea, East China Sea, and Sea of Japan, and migrates to the southern Okhotsk Sea in the spring, where it mixes with the O stock. Peak calving is December in the North Atlantic, December to January in the North Pacific, and May to July for the J stock. The calving interval is only a year, so females are often simultaneously pregnant and lactating. Females reach physical maturity perhaps as early as 13 years of age; another study suggested that growth ceases for both sexes when they have 15 to 20 growth layers in their tympanic bullae, which may correspond to about 15 to 20 years of age. Both sexes can live to about 50 years of age – the oldest in a study of Icelandic minke whales were 42 years for females and 47 years for males, respectively. Dwarf minke whales typically live to be 50 to 60 years old.

=== Brain ===
The brains of common minke whales have around 12.8 billion neocortical neurons and 98.2 billion neocortical glia.

=== Prey ===
Common minke whales have been described as ichthyophagous, but their diet also includes pelagic crustaceans and cephalopods and varies by region, season, and year.

==== North Atlantic ====
In the North Atlantic, they primarily eat small schooling fish, demersal fish, and krill. A 2007 study showed that off Spitsbergen they fed almost exclusively on members of the euphausiid genus Thysanoessa (mainly T. inermis), but nearly a fifth also fed on small amounts of capelin. A small percentage of individuals, by decreasing frequency, also fed on polar cod, Atlantic cod, haddock, and copepods. Capelin dominated off Bear Island and in the southern Barents Sea, accounting for about three-quarters of their diet in both regions. Nearly half (nearly 46 per cent) also consumed euphausiids (Thysanoessa spp.) in the former area – haddock (12.5%), blue whiting (8.3%), polar cod, Atlantic cod, Atlantic herring, and copepods constituted the rest. Herring and haddock were also taken in the southern Barents Sea (accounting for 41.5 and 28.7 per cent by frequency of occurrence, respectively), while sandeel (Ammodytes spp.), Atlantic cod, copepods, euphausiids, pollock, and blue whiting made up the rest of the diet. In the Norwegian Sea, herring was found in all individuals sampled (n= 10), with some (20 per cent each) also feeding on a small amount of capelin and blue whiting – an earlier study, based on data primarily obtained between 1943 and 1945, showed that they fed exclusively on herring off Vesterålen, while the diet off Lofoten was more varied, including herring (34 per cent by occurrence), pelagic crustaceans (23%), Atlantic cod (22%), haddock (6%), and a mixture of coalfish and flatfish for one individual (1.5%). In the North Sea, they primarily fed on sandeel (62%) and Atlantic mackerel (nearly 30%), with some feeding on herring (16.2%), small amounts of Mueller's pearlside (10.8%), copepods, haddock, capelin, and whiting. They were found to feed almost exclusively on Atlantic mackerel in the northern North Sea, while the same was true for sandeel in the eastern North Sea. Off Iceland, they mainly fed on sandeel (nearly 58 per cent of sampled individuals), haddock (22.6%), herring (20%), capelin (19.4%), and Atlantic cod (14.7%), with the rest of the diet consisting of euphausiids, various larger species of gadoids, and Norway pout. Sandeel was more important in southern Iceland (constituting 78 per cent of sampled individuals), while capelin (35.1%), haddock (28.7%), and cod (22.3%) were more important in the north. Euphausiids were only consumed in the north. Although haddock was only a minor part of the diet the first couple years of the study (0 and 4% in 2003 and 2004, respectively), it subsequently constituted a major component of it (31-35% in 2005–2007), while sandeel's importance in the south declined considerably (95.2 to 77.7% from 2003 to 2006, but only 18.1% in 2007). Off southeastern Greenland, they only fed on capelin, while sandeel dominated off southwestern Greenland. In a sample of 172 minke whales caught off Newfoundland between 1966 and 1972, the vast majority (85%) fed only on fish, mainly capelin. Some fed on a mixture of capelin and cod, while others had only consumed cod. Other gadoids, herring, krill, and squid formed the rest of the diet.

==== North Pacific ====
In the North Pacific, small schooling fish and krill are major food items. They feed exclusively on Pacific herring in the northern Okhotsk Sea and only on Alaska pollock east of Sakhalin Island. Japanese mackerel (found in 61 per cent of sampled stomachs) and Pacific saury (18%) are consumed east of the southern Kuril Islands, with only the former species being found in whales sampled in September and the latter species likewise only being found in whales taken in October. Euphausiids make up nearly two-thirds of the diet (62%) around the western Aleutian Islands, with unidentified fish (19%) constituting most of the rest. On the Okhotsk Sea side of Hokkaido they mainly feed on euphausiids (55%), but also take sardine (24%) and sand lance (13%); on the Pacific side of Hokkaido, they feed almost exclusively on sardine (99%). In Sanriku, sardine makes up the bulk of the diet (54%), but euphausiids also play an important part (32%) – only a small percentage (9%) fed on sand lance. Euphausiids were a major food item on the Okhotsk Sea side of Hokkaido and off Sanriku in the spring (71, 72 and 62% from April–June in the former area, and 83% in April in the latter area), while sardine dominated the diet in the summer in both areas (71% in September for the former region, and 70, 92, and 93% from May–July in the latter region). More recent data from Japanese scientific catches in the western North Pacific shows Japanese anchovy to be a major component of the diet in two of the three sub-areas (60 per cent by weight in sub-area 7 and 37.4% in sub-area 8), while Pacific saury was the major food item in sub-area 9 (64.6%) and played an important part of the diet in sub-area 8 (36.4%). Euphausiids (9.2% in all areas combined), Alaska pollock (7.8% in sub-area 7), minimal armhook squid (4.9% in sub-area 9), and mackerel were also consumed. They are thought to feed on juvenile herring and probably sand lance (Ammodytes hexapterus) around the San Juan Islands, while in the Monterey Bay region they have been observed feeding on baitfish – probably northern anchovy, which is abundant there.

==== Southern Hemisphere ====
In the Southern Ocean, dwarf minkes feed mainly on myctophid fishes. An immature female caught in the sub-Antarctic had euphausiids in its stomach, while two pregnant females from the same area had consumed fish and a mature male only had myctophids in its stomach. An immature male caught in a gillnet off southern Brazil had a stomach almost filled with the euphausiid Euphausia similis.

=== Predation ===
There have been numerous recorded instances of killer whales preying on or attacking common minke whales in places such as the Kamchatka Peninsula, Alaska, British Columbia, Washington State, California, the Gulf of St. Lawrence, Greenland, and Svalbard. They are normally able to outpace pursuing killer whales in open water or are trapped in a bay, where they are rammed and drowned or strand and die – in one instance a minke whale was able to refloat itself on the rising tide and swim away. Chases usually last about 30 minutes to an hour and can reach speeds of up 30 km/h (19 mph), often with both species porpoising out of the water in low-angle leaps. Typically two to four killer whales and a lone minke are involved. If the pursuing killer whales do catch up to the minke it does not defend itself, which is typical of the fast-moving members of its genus. On two occasions fleeing minkes sought shelter under a boat, once off Yakutat, Alaska, in 1977 and again in Glacier Bay, Alaska, in 1996 – in both instances they were attacked and killed. Killer whales typically only eat the tongue, skin, and some of the blubber of the minkes they kill. Killer whales can catch up to minke whales in the early stages of a chase, but minke whales appear to have superior endurance and often escape much further than the pursuing killer whale.

=== Scavenging ===
Greenland sharks have been found scavenging the blubber thrown overboard during Norwegian minke whaling operations off Svalbard. Great white sharks and blue sharks have also been observed feeding on a minke whale carcass off California.

=== Whale falls ===
A new species of siboglinid annelid worm, Osedax mucofloris, was discovered on the carcass of a 5.3 m (17.4 ft) female minke whale experimentally placed at a depth of 125 m (410 ft) in the North Sea. This genus of worm uses endosymbiotic bacteria to feed on the bones of whales that fall to the seafloor.

=== Parasites and epibiotics ===
Common minke whales are a host to a number of internal and external parasites, as well as commensals, and other epibiotic fauna. Off Iceland, 45.2 per cent (85 of 188) of sampled minke whales bore old scars from attacks by the sea lamprey Petromyzon marinus, while a further 10.6 per cent had fresh scars on the posterior part of their flanks; five were found with live lampreys still clinging to their flesh. The copepod Caligus elongatus was found on 11.9 per cent of individuals, with a mean intensity (M. I.) of 95.5 per whale – the monogenean hyperparasite Udonella caligorum was also found attached to 22 (6.6%) of a sub-sample of 332 C. elongatus. Another copepod, Pennella balaenopterae, was found anchored into the flesh of 10.3 per cent of the whales (M. I. 1.6, with a maximum of five). The whale louse Cyamus balaenopterae was found on the skin of 6.5 per cent of the whales (M.I. 37), while the pseudo-stalked barnacle Xenobalanus globicipitis was found on the flukes of three whales (M.I. 5.3). A single individual of the goose barnacle Conchoderma auritum was found attached to a baleen plate that belonged to a 7.9 m (26 ft) male caught off the northwest coast in 2005, while four C. virgatum were found attached to a specimen of P. balaenopterae on a 5.3 m (17 ft) female caught off the north coast in 2003.

In the St. Lawrence Estuary of eastern Canada, sea lampreys (P. marinus) were seen on 47 individually identified minke whales on over 100 occasions between 1999 and 2004. They were seen on the whales from June to October, with peak sightings in July and August. Between one and four lampreys were found per whale; the majority were attached below or behind the dorsal fin. On eighteen occasions, the same whale was seen multiple times with one or more lampreys attached to the same spot on its body from two to 87 days with an average of fifteen days. Twice whales were seen right after a lamprey had detached from them, revealing a bloody lesion that showed that the lampreys were feeding on their blood. On several occasions scrapes were seen on the whales from lampreys moving about their bodies probably "actively seeking areas of greater access to blood or decreased water flow".

Among a sample of 100 minke whales caught in the western North Pacific in 1995, 78% had the copepod P. balaenopterae anchored into their skin and blubber – the goose barnacle C. virgatum was found attached to P. balaenopterae on three of the whales. The whale louse C. balaenopterae was found on the skin of four whales, while a single whale had the pseudo-stalked barnacle X. globicipitis attached to its skin. All individuals sampled were infected with the nematode Anisakis simplex in their stomachs (sometimes their small intestine) and the acanthocephalan Bolbosoma nipponicum in their small intestine. Other internal parasites included the cestodes Diphyllobothrium macroovatum, Diplogonoporus balaenopterae, and Tetrabothius sp., which infected the small intestine and were found in 17 per cent of the sample (all three species combined).

In the eastern North Pacific, forty-three of forty-four individually identified minke whales possessed what were believed to be scars from cookiecutter sharks, while three had individuals of the commensal barnacle Xenobalanus globicipitis attached to their dorsal fins. Both are primarily warm water species and may be evidence of migration for minke whales from British Columbia to tropical waters.

An immature male dwarf minke whale that stranded on the Banks Peninsula, South Island, New Zealand, had a stomach heavily infested with the nematode Anisakis and cysts of the cestode genus Phyllobothrium encased in the boundary between its blubber and muscle, while an immature male caught in a gillnet off southern Brazil had a stomach heavily infested with nematodes of the genera Pseudoterranova (about 97%) and Anisakis (about 3%).

== Behavior ==
=== Group size ===
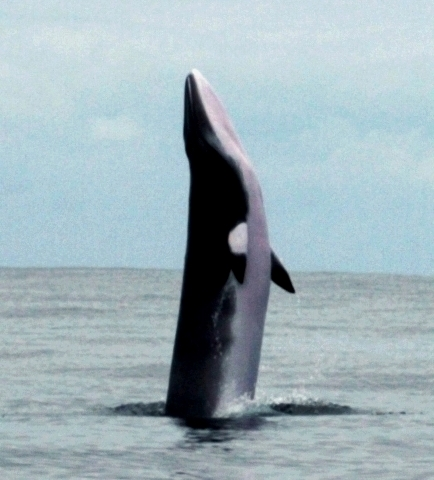
Common minke whale breaching off the Azores

Common minke whales are normally seen singly. In the San Juan Islands, although up to six whales could be seen in a feeding area at once they usually acted independently, with no indications of cooperative feeding like that observed in their larger relatives the humpback and fin whale. On occasion, two whales could be seen surfacing at the same time, within one or two body lengths of each other – such associations could last for only one surfacing to as long as about 90 minutes. Only once were three individuals seen together for a couple surfacings. In the Monterey Bay area, usually only one whale was visible at a time; on only four occasions were two whales seen swimming together. On several occasions in the Johnstone Strait area pairs and trios were briefly seen surfacing together. Around the Isle of Mull, about 68 per cent of the sightings involved single whales, 26.5 per cent involved two or three whales, while only 5.4 per cent involved groups of four to ten. Off Western Greenland and in the Gulf of St. Lawrence and southern Gulf of Maine, almost all sightings involved single whales. Off Iceland, the majority of sightings (93%) were of lone whales, with only a minority of the encounters including pairs (4%) or trios (less than 3%). Cow-calf pairs were absent from most of these regions – a single cow-calf pair was seen off the Isle of Mull in 1992, while only three were seen in the southern Gulf of Maine (in May, August, and October). Of 89 sightings in the Okhotsk Sea and Northwest Pacific, 80 were of solitary whales, seven of pairs, and one each involved groups of four and five whales.

Northern minke whales occasionally breach, sometimes completely clearing the water – one individual in the Johnstone Strait area reacted to the approach of foraging killer whales by breaching eight times in rapid succession.

All of the dwarf minke whales caught off South Africa were taken singly. The majority of sightings of dwarf minke whales on the Great Barrier Reef involved either single whales (53.3%) or pairs (28.9%), with the maximum number of individuals in a group being eight. Four cow-calf pairs were seen as well. Individuals encountered on the various reef systems there often approached dive boats and circled them as well as the divers in the water. They were also seen breaching. Off Brazil, groups normally only consisted of one or two individuals, which actively avoided whale watching boats and fishing vessels. Here they were seen to associate with feeding flocks of seabirds, usually brown boobies but also kelp gulls and terns on occasion.

=== Segregation ===
Common minke whales exhibit a great degree of spatial and temporal segregation by sex, age, and reproductive condition. Off Greenland, females dominate on the west coast (comprising 68% of individuals), while males predominate off the east coast (57%). On the west coast, the proportion of females in offshore waters increases with latitude, being lowest in the south (less than 40% from 60 to 63°N) and highest north of 70°N (over 90%). Females dominate during the spring and early summer (comprising nearly 79% of individuals from May to July), while the percentage of males increases from 38 to 45 per cent in the late summer (August to September). In coastal waters, the highest incidence of females occurs in the spring (about 85%), declines in the summer (72%), and rises again in the fall (over 75%). Over 70 per cent of the females in offshore waters are mature, nearly all of them pregnant (94.4%).

Off Iceland, males dominate in most areas (particularly off the southwest coast, where they comprise 70% of individuals), while females form the slight majority (53%) on the east coast. Females dominate in the spring in most areas (61%), while males predominate in the summer (58%) and fall (66%). In the northeastern North Atlantic, females dominate around the Svalbard archipelago and in the Barents Sea (62.2 to 73.9%), while males predominate around the British Isles and off Norway (54.3 to 68.1%). Larger individuals of both sexes primarily occur further north (off Svalbard and in the Barents Sea), while smaller individuals mainly occur to the south (e.g. along the Norwegian coast from Lofoten south, in an area once known as a summering ground for newly weaned calves). In the Barents Sea, over 40 per cent of females are mature, with the vast majority being pregnant (94.4%).

In the western North Pacific, larger animals are typically found in higher latitudes (e.g. in the Okhotsk Sea, south of the Kuril Islands, and around the Commander and western Aleutian Islands), while smaller animals, especially females, dominate in lower latitudes (e.g. off Sanriku). The percentage of mature females is high in offshore areas (72.5 to 86.7%), with most of them being pregnant (85.7 to 100%). In coastal areas, however, most females are immature (60.4 to 94.2%) and fewer of the mature females are pregnant (40 to 58.4%). Females dominate in the northern Yellow Sea (90.9%) and off the east coast of North Korea (69.2%), while males predominate off the west coast of Honshu (72.6%) and off the southwest and west coasts of Hokkaido (90.5 and 59.7%). In the southern Okhotsk Sea, females arrive earlier than males (April and May, respectively), while mature females arrive earlier than immature ones.

=== Surfacing sequence ===
When a minke whale first comes to the surface to breathe its pointed rostrum is the first to break the surface. It either exhales beforehand or a narrow, diffuse blow or a low, bushy, diffuse blow is visible. It then arches its back in a quick motion, exaggerating this arch during its terminal deep dive. Often the blowholes and dorsal fin are visible at the same time. Depending on its behavior, it may exhale anywhere from one to seven times in rapid succession before going on a longer dive of several minutes duration. In the Gulf of St. Lawrence, this depended on whether a whale was traveling, searching, or feeding. During traveling, when the whale was slower moving (generally in a straight line), it would exhale the greatest number of times (6.44 on average) and dive for a longer period of time (3.67 minutes on average) than when it was feeding, which was characterized by constant change in direction and vigorous swimming – this normally involved one or two respirations interspersed with three to seven (2.27 on average) followed by a relatively short dive (1.36 minutes on average). When a whale was searching, on the other hand (which involved the whale moving at a faster speed than traveling in a sort of zigzag motion), it would exhale 3.22 times on average and dive the longest of the three modes (3.76 minutes on average).

In the Monterey Bay area, focal follows of minke whales showed that they respired an average of 3.74 times during a surfacing sequence. These short duration dives averaged 37.8 seconds and were followed by a long duration dive of an average of 4.43 minutes. In the San Juan Islands, the number of exhalations and the duration of dives depended on whether the whale was lunge feeding or feeding with birds. In the former method of feeding, whales made short dives – about 22 seconds long – up to seven times in rapid succession before making a long dive of about 3.8 minutes, while during the latter method they made longer short dives of about 65 seconds followed by shorter long dives of about 1.5 minutes.

=== Feeding techniques ===
In the Gulf of St. Lawrence, minke whales exhibit three types of behaviors: entrapment maneuvers, engulfment maneuvers, and entrapment/engulfment maneuvers. Entrapment maneuvers include circles, gyres, ellipses, figure-of-eights, and hyperbolas. Circles involve a whale, lying on its side with its ventral surface facing its intended prey, swimming in a circle 1.5 to 2.5 times its diameter and lunging mouth agape across the diameter of this circle. As the whale mounts the water column the movement of its flukes create a print or trace. Gyres are larger versions of circles that steadily decrease in diameter as the whale performs each circuit. Ellipses cover a greater area than the former two maneuvers as the whale swims a long and short axis – the former can be greater than 100 m (330 ft) at times. Ellipses can be maintained for long periods of time and may include feeding circles within them as well as a number of engulfing maneuvers. Unlike circles, surface traces are rarely apparent. Figure-of-eights are smaller versions of ellipses, with a long axis of less than six body lengths. The whale turns in opposite directions at each end of the long axis. Hyperbolas involve the whale turning at least once at the end of a short straight line run – this maneuver is sometimes performed alongside a rock face, followed by an inward facing feeding lunge.

Engulfment maneuvers include plunges, oblique, lateral, vertical and ventral lunges. During plunges the whale approaches the water at an angle of less than 30° with its ventral surface facing downwards. Usually only the rostrum and part of the lower lip are visible above the surface of the water as it breaks the surface and often the tops of the extended ventral pleats. Oblique lunges are executed at a greater angle (about 45°) and entirely expose the extended ventral pleats; at times the entire body exits the water in a low, porpoising-like breach. During a lateral lunge the whale breaks the surface on its side, while during vertical and ventral lunges the whale exits the water at a 90° angle and while on its back, respectively.

Entrapment/engulfment maneuvers include horizontal, lateral and ventral arcs. During a horizontal arc a whale turns sharply – on either side – with only a pectoral fin or occasionally a tip of the flukes breaking the surface of the water. Lateral and ventral arcs are similar to lateral and ventral lunges, but without any part of the whale breaking the surface of the water. All three of these maneuvers have been observed with both expanded and unexpanded ventral pleats.

Plunges were used the most often (22% of the time), followed by ventral (19%), lateral (17%), and oblique lunges (15%). Vertical lunges were infrequently utilized (only 5% of the time), as were horizontal (7%), ventral (6%), and lateral arcs (3%).

Novel feeding techniques were observed during a study of five individually identified minke whales (named M1 to M5) in the Saguenay Fjord National Park, on the north side of the St. Lawrence estuary, from June to October 2003. These maneuvers included head slaps, chip-up blows, and exhales on the dive. During a head slap, the whale would raise its head high out of the water at angle of about 30 to 45°, take a quick breath, and then slam its head onto the water, creating a loud splash. It would do this without expanding its ventral pleats or forcing water out of its mouth. After doing several head slaps the whale would perform a feeding lunge. Head slaps were used almost exclusively by M4 and M5. A chin-up blow is similar to a normal surfacing but more energetic and executed at a greater angle as the whale comes high out of the water to breathe and dive again in one continuous motion without slapping the surface of the water. Chin-up blows were utilized often and performed by all five whales; it was the principal technique used by M1, M2, and M3 prior to a feeding lunge. An exhale on the dive is exactly what its name implies: a whale exhaling as its blowholes submerge. This resulted in a large volume of water being displaced and typically followed a normal blow or a chin-up blow and on occasion a head slap. This technique was only executed by M1 and M5. These new techniques are thought to have been developed by these whales to help them herd small schooling fish (likely capelin) in the well-mixed waters of the Saguenay Fjord; these tactics were not observed in the nearby Laurentian Channel Head, where "strong tidal currents, a stratified water column and bottom topography combine to create large areas of upwelling in which prey are forced to the surface".

In July 2007, a minke whale with what appeared to be a rope injury was observed surface feeding on capelin in the Gulf of St. Lawrence. The long, linear laceration extended around the ventral pleats, restricting their distention. This individual performed a number of oblique lunges on its right side and then rotated in mid-air to the left, landing upright on its rostrum. This was not observed in any of the other feeding whales. This may have been done to avoid landing on the injured portion of its ventral pleats.

=== Vocalizations ===
==== North Atlantic ====
Pulse trains recorded in the North Atlantic

In the North Atlantic, minke whales produce downsweeps and "pulse" or "thump trains". Downsweeps, which last 0.4 seconds in duration and sweep down from 100 to 200 Hz (median: 118 Hz) to below 90 Hz (median: 80 Hz) have been recorded in the St. Lawrence estuary of eastern Canada. Pulse trains have been recorded off Puerto Rico and in Massachusetts Bay. Two types, "speed-up" and "slow-down", were recorded off Puerto Rico, while the same two calls as well as a "constant" call, were recorded in Massachusetts Bay. They differ in pulse rate, peak frequency, and duration. In the latter area, slow-down was the most commonly recorded type. Their peak frequencies ranged from 58 to 136 Hz and each pulse lasted from 0.07 to 0.12 seconds, together producing pulse trains of 12.4 to 39.8 seconds in duration. Detections of pulse trains peaked during August and September, with most calls being heard from mid-July to mid-November. None were recorded in January and February and few were detected from March to June. The pulse trains off Puerto Rico were recorded in March.

==== North Pacific ====
In the North Pacific, what were called "boings" was first described in the mid-1960s from submarine recordings made off San Diego, California, and Kaneohe, Hawaii, in the 1950s. They consist of a brief pulse – called a precursor – with a duration of 0.28 seconds (range: 0.15 to 1.6 seconds) followed by a frequency and amplitude modulated long call – called the AM component – of 2.2 seconds duration (range: 1.4 to 4.2 seconds). Both had peak frequencies of 1.4 kHz with harmonics of up to 9 kHz. These strange calls were recorded from October to May – peaking in March – and had a source level of about 150 decibels with reference to one micropascal metre. Their source remained a mystery for decades. By the early 1980s they were thought to come from whales, but it wasn't known what species. In the early 2000s, it was suggested these sounds might originate from minke whales, based on their similarities to vocalizations produced by Southern Hemisphere forms. Finally, during a 2002 HICEAS (Hawaiian Islands Cetacean and Ecosystem Assessment Survey) survey, the R/V David Starr Jordan, using a towed hydrophone array, detected boings off the northwestern Hawaiian Islands on 7 November 2002 and discovered they came from a minke whale, which they photographed and biopsied.

Boings have been divided into two types: the central boing and the eastern boing. The former has only been recorded west of 135°W, while the latter has only been recorded east of 138°W. They differ in pulse repetition rate and total duration. There may also be a "western boing" off Japan. Most boings have been recorded in the tropical and warm temperate North Pacific during the winter and spring, but some have also been detected in the northeastern Chukchi Sea in the summer and fall.

==== Southern Hemisphere ====
The "star wars" vocalization, a complex, stereotyped call consisting of three components ranging from 50 Hz to 9.4 kHz, is produced by the dwarf minke whale. It has a source level of 150 to 165 decibels at a reference pressure of one micropascal at one metre. This bizarre call, described as "almost synthetic, metallic, or mechanical", has been recorded during June and July on the northern Great Barrier Reef (about 14°30'S to 17°S), off Stradbroke Island, Queensland (27°30'S), and off Coffs Harbour, New South Wales (30°S). They also produce downswept calls of 250 to 50 Hz.

== Whaling ==
=== North Atlantic ===
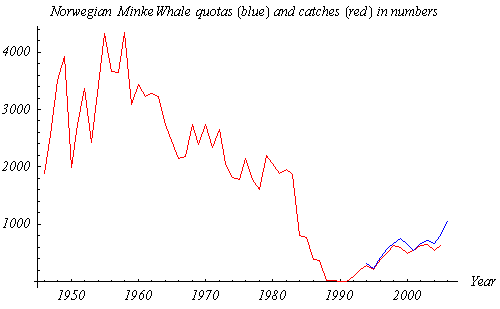
Norwegian minke whale quotas (blue line, 1994–2006) and catches (red line, 1946.2005) in numbers (from Norwegian official statistics)

The first written records attest to the active hunting of minke whales off Norway by 1100 A.D. By 1240 they began utilizing iron darts fired from crossbows that had been treated with the tissue of dead sheep infected with the bacterium Clostridium. Introducing this infectious agent to a wound weakened the whale and after a couple days the men would return and lance it to death. This method of whaling continued to be used until the 1880s.

Norwegian catching of minke whales from small fishing vessels started off Møre, western Norway, in the 1920s. It had spread north to Salten by 1932 and all along the Norwegian coast and to Bear Island, Spitsbergen, and the Barents Sea by the late 1930s – the latter area, particularly the southeastern region east to Novaya Zemlya, was one of the most important whaling grounds, with over 2,400 whales being caught there in 1949. Licenses were introduced in 1938. A westward expansion to the waters north and east of Iceland occurred; by 1966 they had reached the Denmark Strait and western Greenland just two years later. At its peak over 300 vessels participated in the hunt each season, but this declined to about 50 in the 1980s. By the end of the Second World War the catch was at nearly 2,000 per annum, peaked at 4,338 in 1958, and declined to 2,307 by 1970. Over 125,000 have been caught by Norwegian commercial whaling since 1938. In accordance with the moratorium against commercial whaling voted on by the International Whaling Commission in 1982 and taking effect in 1986, commercial catches ceased in 1987 (albeit only temporarily). From 1988 to 1990 and again from 1992 to 1994 Norway caught minke whales under scientific permit and resumed commercial whaling of the species in 1993. They typically catch 450 to 600 individuals a year, with 464 being taken in 2012.

Minke whales were first caught off Iceland in 1914 by the powered 4-ton fishing vessel Margrét IS 314, which was mounted with a 1.5 inch bore harpoon gun – this was replaced in 1923 with a 2-inch bore harpoon gun manufactured in Norway. Later other vessels joined the trade. Operations were limited to coastal waters, normally within 30 nautical miles of shore. The season extended from the beginning of March to late November, even to early December at times; though most were caught between April and October. They were mainly caught for their meat, with a minimum of 3,362 being taken between 1914 and 1980. Catch limits were introduced in 1977. The average annual catch rose from 105 from 1966 to 1970, to 137 from 1971 to 1975, and finally to 200 from 1976 to 1980. The last were caught in 1985 before whaling resumed in 2003 under scientific permit, with 200 being taken from 2003 to 2007. Commercial whaling for minkes was renewed in 2006, with a total catch of 296 between 2006 and 2012.

A Newfoundland whaling company began catching "little piked whales" (minke whales) off northeastern Newfoundland in 1947, taking 16 in its first year and 41 in 1948. A total of 812 minke whales were caught off Newfoundland between 1947 and 1972, with a peak of 97 in 1972. They were captured by one to three 12.2 to 15.2 m (40 to 50 ft) wood-hulled vessels that had a 50 mm harpoon cannon mounted on their bows. Whales were towed to a shore station for flensing. They were first caught in Conception, Bonavista, and Trinity bays, but later catches (1966 to 1972) were mainly made in Trinity Bay itself. The season extended from May to September (rarely October), with peak catches being made in June and July. A small number – 51 between 1962 and 1967 – were also caught off Nova Scotia, with the season lasting from June to August.

Minke whales were first exploited by Greenlanders off western Greenland in 1948, when a fishing vessel mounted with a harpoon cannon began catching them. This vessel averaged 18 whales per annum (range four to 32), before being joined by three other vessels in 1958. The number of vessels participating in the hunt each year increased rapidly, rising from 18 in 1963, to 25 in 1964, and to 45 in 1965. The peak was reached in 1968 and 1969, with 56 vessels active in both years. From 1970 to 1976 the average fluctuated between about 30 and 45 vessels. A total of 3,434 minke whales were taken off western Greenland between 1948 and 1976, with a peak of 315 reached in 1968. The vast majority of these whales were taken by fishing vessels normally targeting cod, shrimp, or salmon, but an increasing number in later years were caught using a number of small boats with out-board motors, armed with high-powered rifles for killing the whale and hand-held harpoons and floating bladders to secure them; walkie-talkies were used for coordination. Usage of this method, called a "collective catch", increased from a catch of just one whale in 1970 to 59 in 1975.

In southwest Greenland (south of 66°15'N), the season lasts from April to November, with peaks in May and October. Occasionally a few whales are caught in the winter. On the central west coast (Disko Bay and adjacent areas from 66°15'N to 70°45'N), the season begins in late May and peaks in July, August or September. In some years, mild ice-less winters also allow catching in this region from November to April. In the northwest (mainly the Umanak district, 70°45'N to 73-74°N), the season doesn't begin until June because of sea ice, with peak catches occurring from July to September. A few are also caught in October and November. Minke whales were caught for their meat, with it mainly being used locally for human consumption and dog food, though in Umanak the Royal Greenland Trading Department purchased some of the products of the hunt beginning in the late 1960s. An additional 4,307 minke whales were caught off Greenland between 1985 and 2012, 4,070 off western Greenland and a paltry 237 off eastern Greenland. The average annual catch during this period has usually been between 150 and 190 whales.

A total of 97 were caught off the Faroe Islands between 1960 and 1971, with a peak of 32 in 1968. One was also taken off Portugal in 1951.

=== North Pacific ===
There is no evidence minke whales were caught in Japan during the harpoon and net whaling eras. The small-type catcher boat Yuko-maru 7 GRT caught the first minkes out of Akukawa in 1930. In the first half of the 1930s, about 20-30 was taken per year out of this port. Minke whaling soon spread to the port of Kamaishi (1938), on the northeast coast of Honshu; Ogawajima (about 1951), on the west coast of Kyushu; and to Wakasa Bay and Aomori (both by 1957), the former on the west coast and the latter on the north coast of Honshu. An average of 23 catcher boats – each of which averaged about 23 tons between 1952 and 1986 – were involved each year between 1950 and 1986, from a peak of 80 in 1950 to a low of seven from 1973 to 1978 – these boats also caught other species, mainly giant beaked whales, short-finned pilot whales, and killer whales. As the number of boats declined the average tonnage increased dramatically, from 14.6 in 1952 to 39 in 1982. In 1979, nine catchers averaged about 360 horsepower – they ranged from 15.2 tons and 150 horsepower for the tiny Katsu Maru (1978–1986) to the 36.99-ton Koei Maru No. 7 at 450 horsepower. The largest was the 47.77-ton Sumitomo Maru No. 31, which operated from 1982 to 1986. These vessels used harpoon guns of 50 mm caliber or less. Because of their small size, limited cruising range, and inability to work during inclement weather, catchers were restricted to within 50 nautical miles of their home port in the 1950s, while the vast majority operated within 80 nautical miles of their home ports or designated unloading ports (for Hokkaido) during the period 1977 to 1987. In 1968 small motorboats were introduced, which scared the whales into swimming quickly at the surface, making them easier to track and exhausting them in the process – this allowed them to be more easily killed as well. The earliest were 4.5 m (15 ft) long and 2 tons with 65-80 horsepower outboard engines; later 4.9 to 5.2 m (16 to 17 ft) boats with 165 horsepower were utilized. The number of catchers using motorboats increased rapidly from 1968 to 1972; by 1979 they all used them.

Several hundred minkes were caught each year, with the peak being reached in 1956, when 532 were taken. A total of 13,334 were taken by Japanese coastal whaling between 1948 and 1987. Most were caught off Sanriku and on the Okhotsk Sea side of Hokkaido, with the Pacific side of Hokkaido gaining some importance by the early 1970s. They were seldom caught off the west coast of Honshu (off Tottori, in Tsuruga Bay, and Toyama Bay), which was abandoned by the mid-1970s. Few were taken on the Sea of Japan side of Hokkaido as well. They were formerly captured off western Kyushu and the south coasts of Honshu and Shikoku, but catching in those regions ceased by 1965 due to the scarcity of whales. The first minkes of the season were caught off western Kyushu and the Sea of Japan side of Honshu, where peak catches occurred from March to May and March to April, respectively; from there effort shifted to the Okhotsk Sea side of Hokkaido and Sanriku, where catches peaked in May for the former area and from April to May in the latter area. Effort was finally diverted to the Pacific side of Hokkaido, where peak catches were made from July to September. The season as a whole extended from February to October.

In 1973 a duel factory-catcher boat was built, the Miwa Maru, which caught 279 minke whales from 1973 to 1975, mainly in the Okhotsk Sea. Japanese pelagic fleets also caught six in the Gulf of Alaska, four in 1964 and two in 1971; an additional 22 were taken by pelagic fleets in the western North Pacific and western Bering Sea in 1969, 1970, and 1976 – the last, a 6.4 m (21 ft) immature female taken at 32°24′N 172°33′E, was a special permit catch.

Commercial catches ended in 1987. In 1994, Japan began catching minke whales in the western North Pacific under scientific permit. Under the title of JARPN (Japanese Whale Research Program under Special Permit in the North Pacific), up to 100 whales were caught each year by a pelagic fleet consisting of the 7,198 to 7,575 gross ton factory ship Nisshin Maru and two to three sighting/sampling vessels – including Toshi Maru No. 25 (739.92 gross tons, 1994–1999), Toshi Maru No. 18 (758.33 gross tons, 1994–1998), Kyo Maru No. 1 (812.08 gross tons, 1995–1999), and Yushin Maru (720 gross tons, 1999) – until 1999. A total of 498 minke whales were caught. After a two-year feasibility study, JARPN II began in 2002, also taking up to 100 whales per year with a pelagic fleet consisting mainly of the same vessels – Nisshin Maru was enlarged to 8,030 gross tons in 2006 and Yūshin Maru No. 2 (747 gross tons) and Yūshin Maru No. 3 (742 gross tons) replaced Toshi Maru No. 25 and Kyo Maru No. 1 in 2003 and 2008, respectively – but expanding its operations to include a coastal component using three to four small-type sampling vessels – mainly Taisho Maru No. 28 (47.31 gross tons, 2002–2012), Sumitomo Maru No. 31 (32 gross tons, 2002–2010), Katsu Maru No. 7 (32 gross tons, 2002–2012), and Koei Maru No. 75 (46 gross tons, 2003–2010) – with a total of up to 120 individuals being caught off Sanriku in the spring and off Kushiro, on the Pacific side of Hokkaido, in the fall. This research program continues to the present.

Whaling for minke whales off Korea began in the early 1930s, when they were opportunistically caught by vessels targeting larger species. The number of boats used per year ranged from 13 (1967–68, 1983–84) to 24 (1965), with 21 per annum between 1975 and 1982. Their average tonnage and horsepower increased from 56 (1971) to 74.5 tons (1982) and from about 220 (1971) to nearly 539 horsepower (1982). In 1982, they ranged from the diminutive Gu Pok, only 18.3 tons and a mere 45 horsepower, to Tae Won and Jin Yang 5 – each nearly 99 tons – and Chung Gu 1, Chung Gu 2 and U Seung 3, all three with 1,000 horsepower. Minkes were permitted to be landed for flensing at the main whaling stations of Ulsan, on the east coast, and Ucheango, on the west coast, as well as Jukbyeon, Kuryongpo, Heusando, Daichangdo, and Cheju. By the early 1960s a few hundred were being caught each year. The catch increased from 715 in 1970, to 882 in 1973, to a peak of 1,033 and 1,018 in 1977 and 1978. Minkes were caught almost year-round (February to December), with the most important whaling ground being the central Yellow Sea from March to April. From there, catches extended to the Korean Strait in May and the southwestern Sea of Japan from June to October. Most were caught from April to June, with a peak in the Yellow Sea in April and in the Sea of Japan in June. They were also caught in the northern Yellow Sea and off the east coast of North Korea (before 1936), where peak catches were reached from May to June and from April to June, respectively. About 16,000 were caught between 1940 and 1986, when hunting of minke whales ceased.

A small number of minke whales were caught by the Soviets in the western North Pacific, with 21 being taken by pelagic fleets between 1933 and 1979 and an additional 94 being caught by catchers operating out of the Kuril Island land stations – the annual catch in the latter region never exceeded nine or ten whales (1951, 1954, and 1956).

One was caught off British Columbia and taken to the whaling station at Coal Harbour, on the west coast of Vancouver Island, in 1967.

=== Southern Hemisphere ===
Few dwarf minke whales have been reported taken by whaling operations. Thirteen were caught off Durban, South Africa, between 1970 and 1973. Nearly all of them (12 of 13, or 92%) were taken in the first half of the season (April to June), over three-quarters within 30 nautical miles of shore. Of 902 minke whales caught off northeastern Brazil in 1980, only three were dwarf. Of 1,789 minke whales caught in the Southern Ocean by the Japanese between 1987–88 and 1992–93, only 16 were dwarf minkes (one was caught in 1987–88, five in 1988–89, three in 1989–90, four in 1990–91, and three in 1992–93). These were taken from December to March between the latitudes of 55°22'S and 65°04'S and the longitudes of 111°26'E and 178°12'E. An additional 180 minke whales (47 males, 133 females) which had flippers with a "clear white band" were taken by Japanese expeditions in the sub-Antarctic between 1972–73 and 1976–77, with a peak of 69 in 1975–76.

== Other mortality ==
Minke whales are occasionally caught in fishing gear of various types, including set nets, fish pots, gillnets, trap nets, trawls, longlines, and seines. Entanglements have been reported off Korea, Japan, Canada, the United States, the Azores, Scotland, Portugal, France, Italy, Greece, Tunisia, Israel, the Canary Islands, Senegal, and Brazil. A total of 1,156 minke whales were caught off Korea between 1996 and 2008, an average of about 88 per year. They were mainly caught with set nets (31.4%), fish pots (27.3%), and gillnets (26.2%). Most were juveniles. Of 17 individuals that were reported caught in trap nets off eastern Honshu between 1978 and 1990, only two escaped alive, the rest being sold for their meat. Ship strikes are another source of mortality. They have been reported off the east coast of the United States, in the Gulf of St. Lawrence, and off Italy. A dwarf minke whale calf that stranded in New South Wales had one of its flukes cut by a propeller, which was the likely reason for its stranding and ensuing death.

In April 2007, a 4.08 m (13.4 ft) juvenile female minke whale died from domoic acid poisoning by ingesting northern anchovies – a known domoic acid vector – during an intense Pseudo-nitzschia bloom off Southern California. In March 2013, a severely emaciated 3.4 m (11 ft) juvenile male stranded at Nieuwpoort, Belgium. It was believed to have died after a prolonged starvation due to compacted plastic debris obstructing its digestive tract – the first confirmed case of death due to the ingestion of litter in a baleen whale. In May 2014, a 6.4 m (21 ft) individual that stranded at Atlantic City, New Jersey, tested positive for morbillivirus.

Minke whale strandings on the Atlantic coast of the United States, from Maine to South Carolina, have increased in frequency since January 2017. These strandings have been declared an Unusual Mortality Event (UME) under the Marine Mammal Protection Act. Full or partial necropsies have been conducted on over 60% of the minke whales stranded on the Atlantic coast since January 2017. Though human interactions and infectious disease were indicated by many of the necropsies, findings have been inconsistent and the cause of the strandings is not fully understood.

== Captivity ==
Several minke whales have been briefly held in captive settings in Japan. All were kept at the Mito Aquarium, in the suburbs of Numazu, Shizuoka, in a square pool netted off from the sea. The first was exhibited for nearly three months in the mid-1930s, but accepted food only during the latter half of its stay. The second was a weeks-old calf that lasted only two weeks in May 1954 before dying. The last was an estimated 6.1 m (20 ft) individual of undetermined sex that had been caught in a fixed net near the aquarium on 26 November 1955 and transported there the same day. It refused the anchovies given to it – though it may have fed on a school of mackerels kept in the pool with it – and simply swam in a counter clockwise circle for 37 days before breaking through the nets on the morning of 2 January 1956, not long after three bottlenose dolphins had been introduced to the same pool. A minke whale measuring 4.55 m (14.9 ft) long and weighing 852 kg (1,878 lb) was captured on June 30, 1982, and kept in captivity until its death on July 4, 1982. A facility in Wakayama Prefecture plans to continue breeding minke whales in the future.

Common minke whale breaching in the St. Lawrence River near Tadoussac, Quebec

== Conservation status ==
The common minke whale is listed as least concern on the IUCN Red List. It is listed on Appendix I of CITES. In addition, the species is covered by the Memorandum of Understanding for the Conservation of Cetaceans and Their Habitats in the Pacific Islands Region (Pacific Cetaceans MOU) and the Agreement on the Conservation of Cetaceans in the Black Sea Mediterranean Sea and Contiguous Atlantic Area (ACCOBAMS).

== Gallery ==
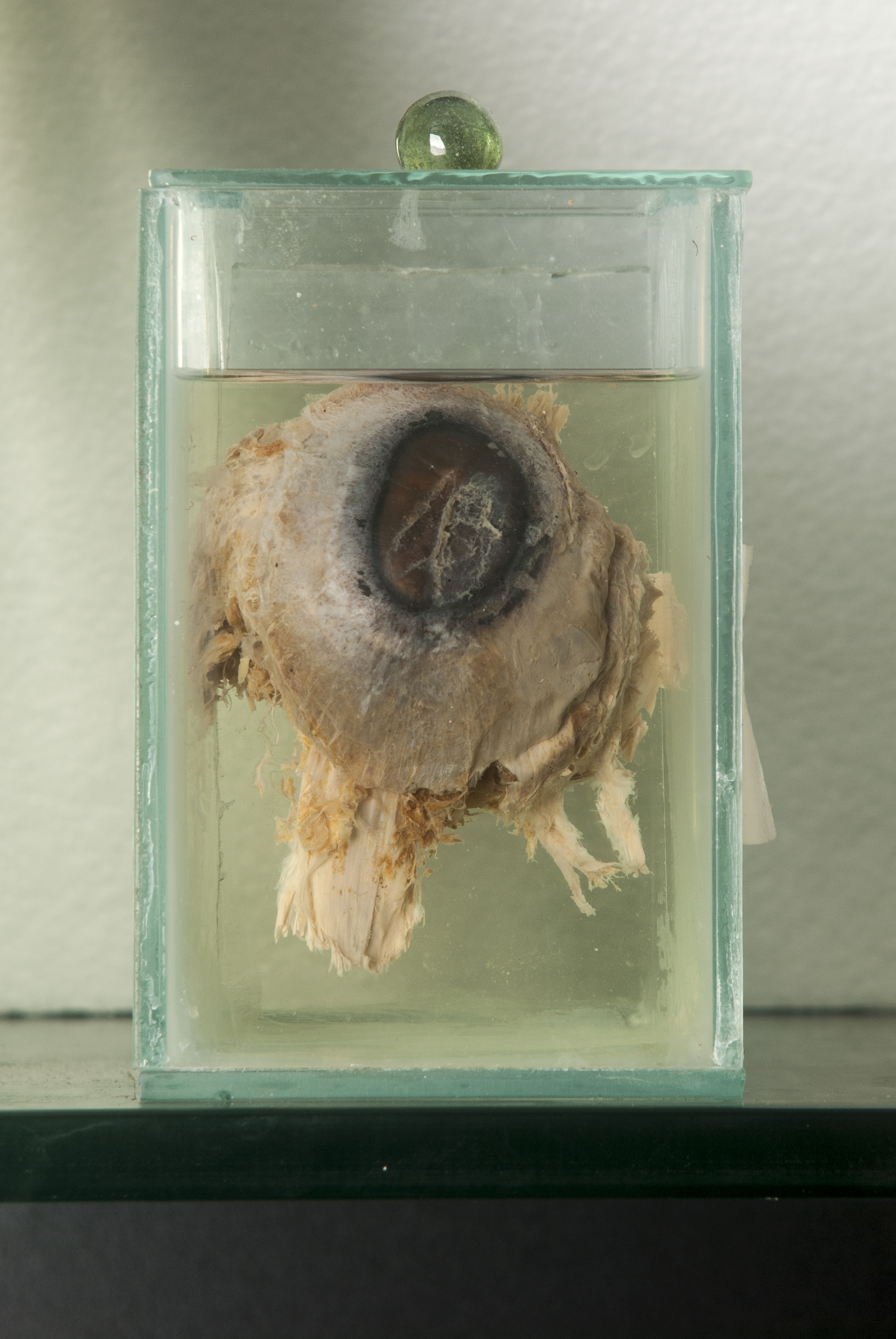
Whale eyeball (Balaenoptera acutorostrata).

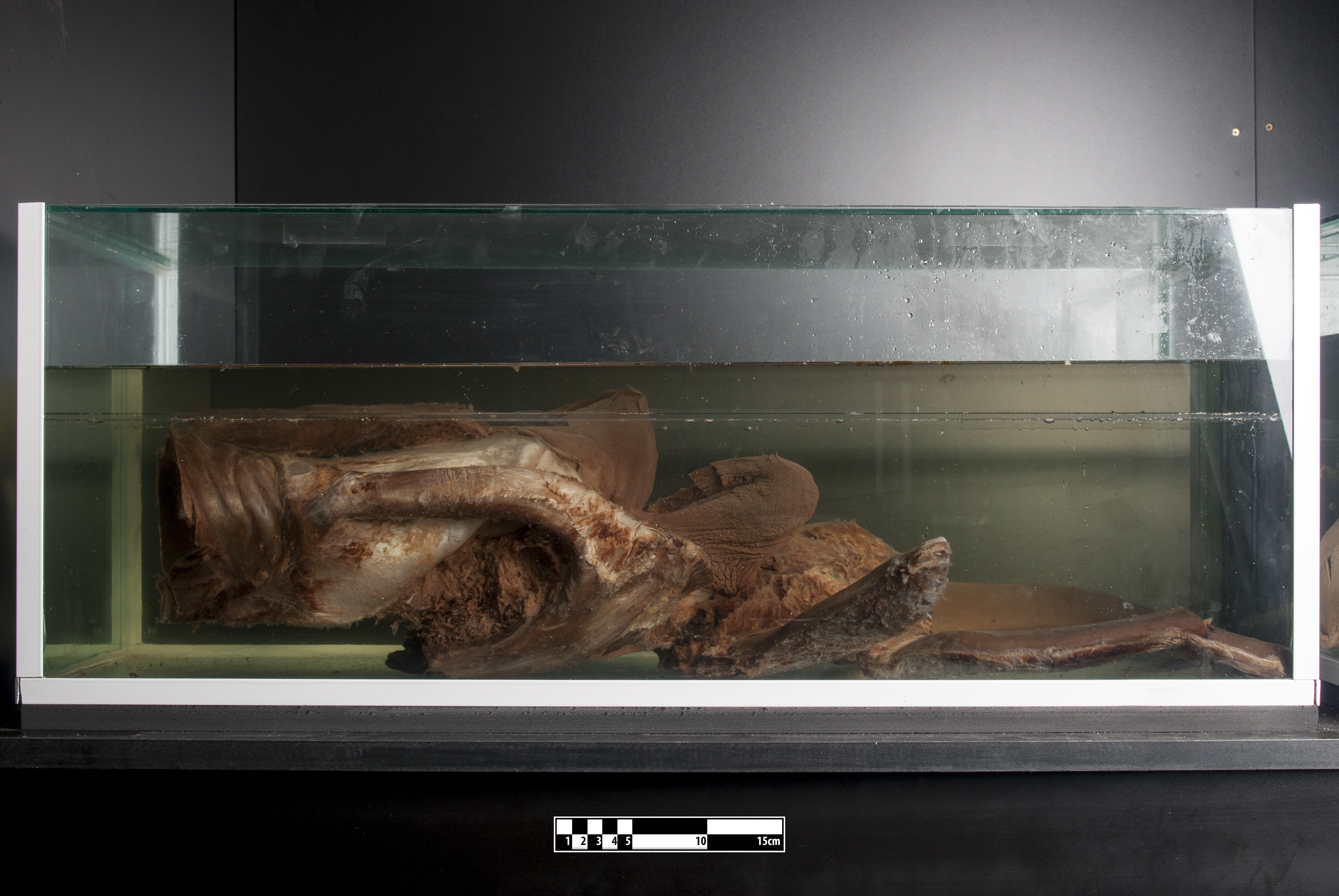
Whale Trachea and Larynx (Balaenoptera acutorostrata).

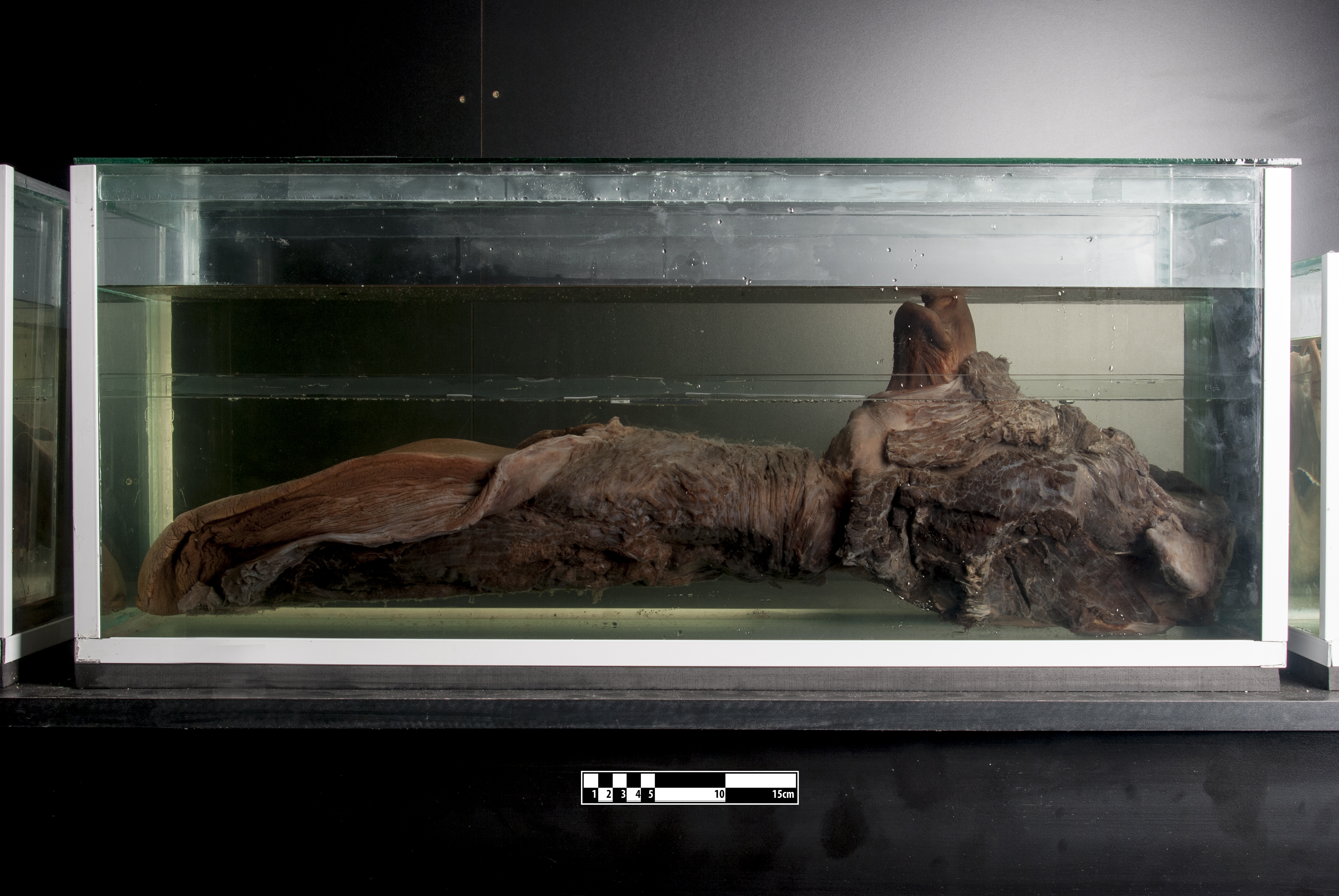
Whale Tongue (Balaenoptera acutorostrata).

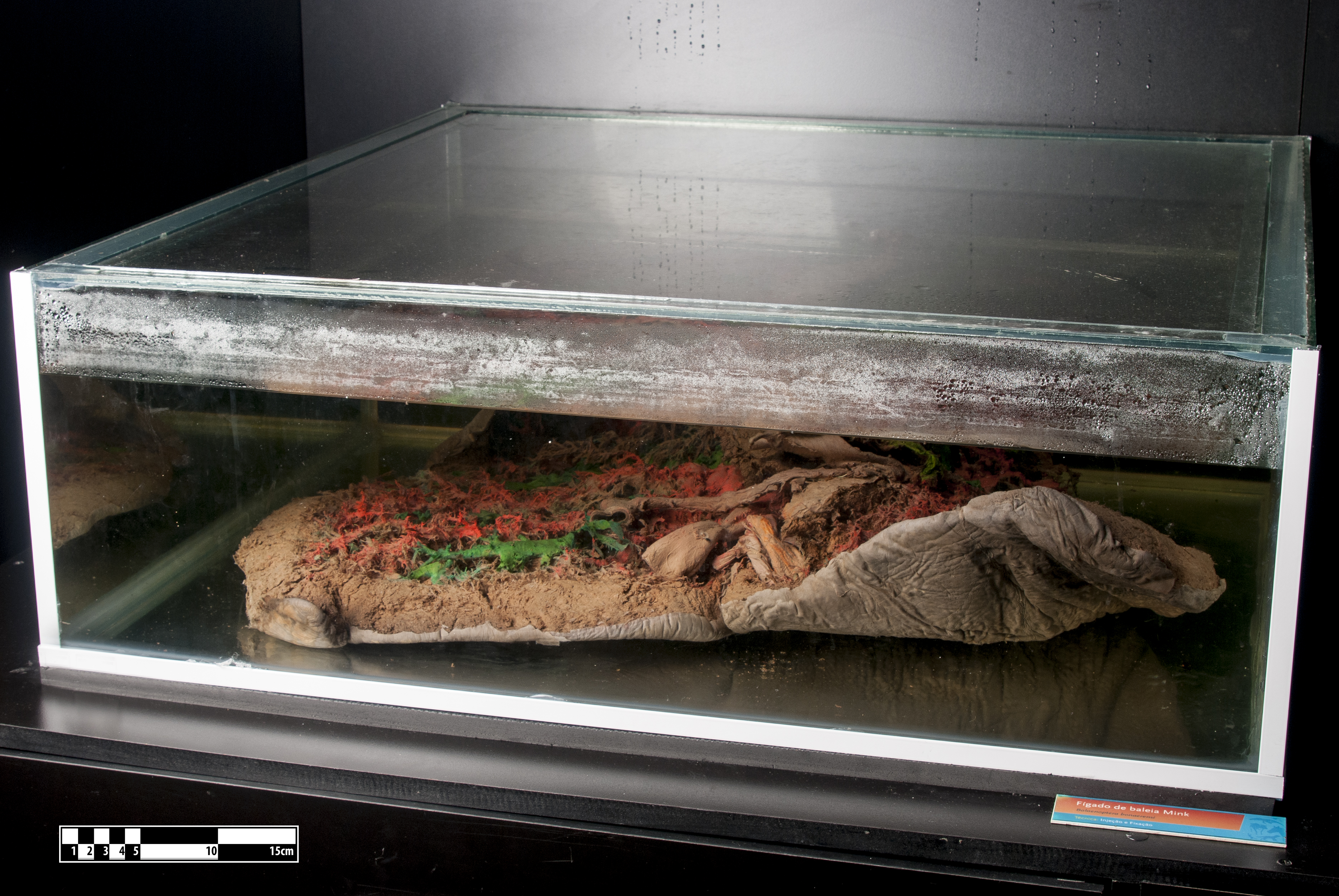
Whale lung (Balaenoptera acutorostrata).

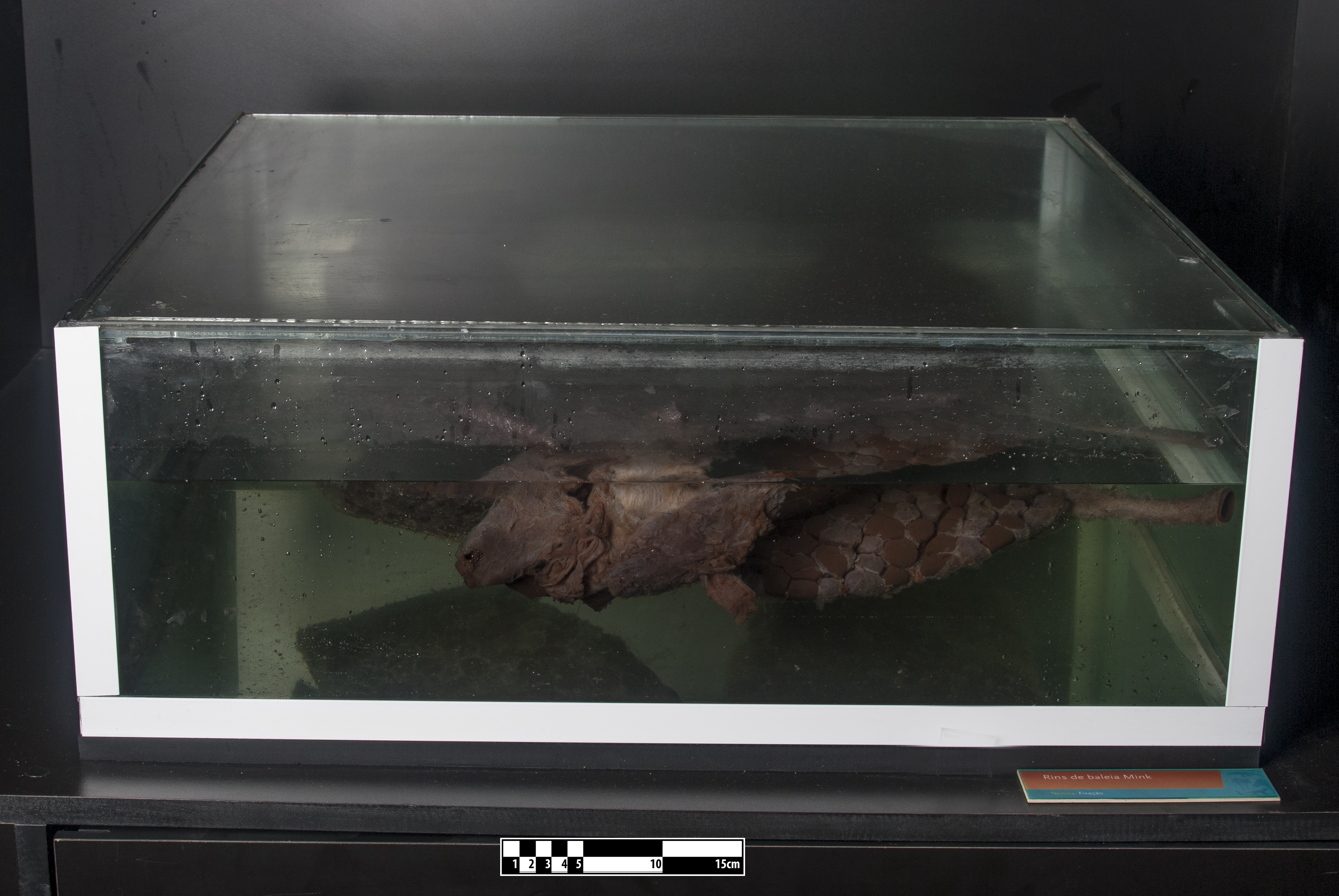
Whale kidney (Balaenoptera acutorostrata).

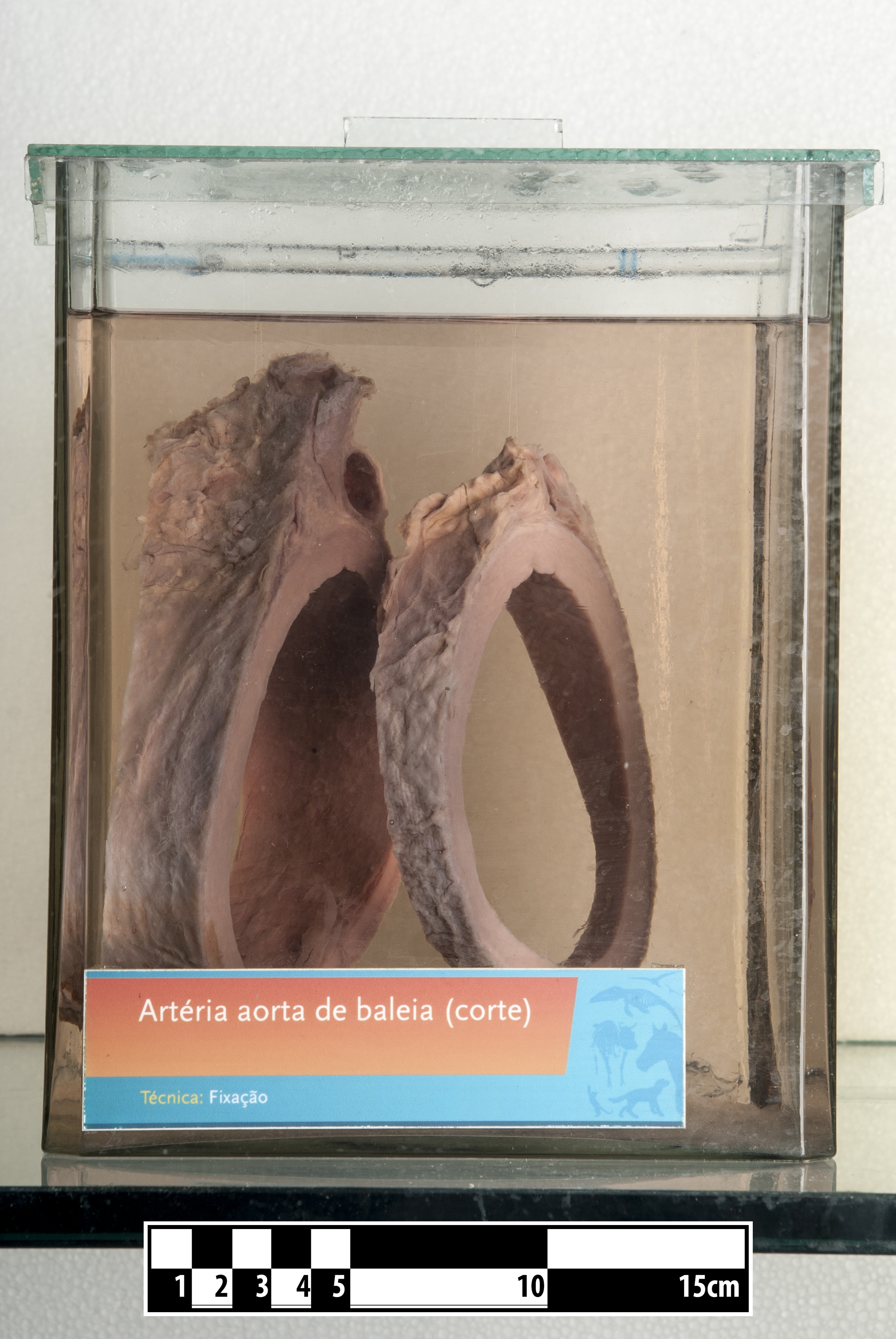
Whale artery (cut) (Balaenoptera acutorostrata).

== See also ==
- List of cetaceans
- List of whale vocalizations
- Marine biology
