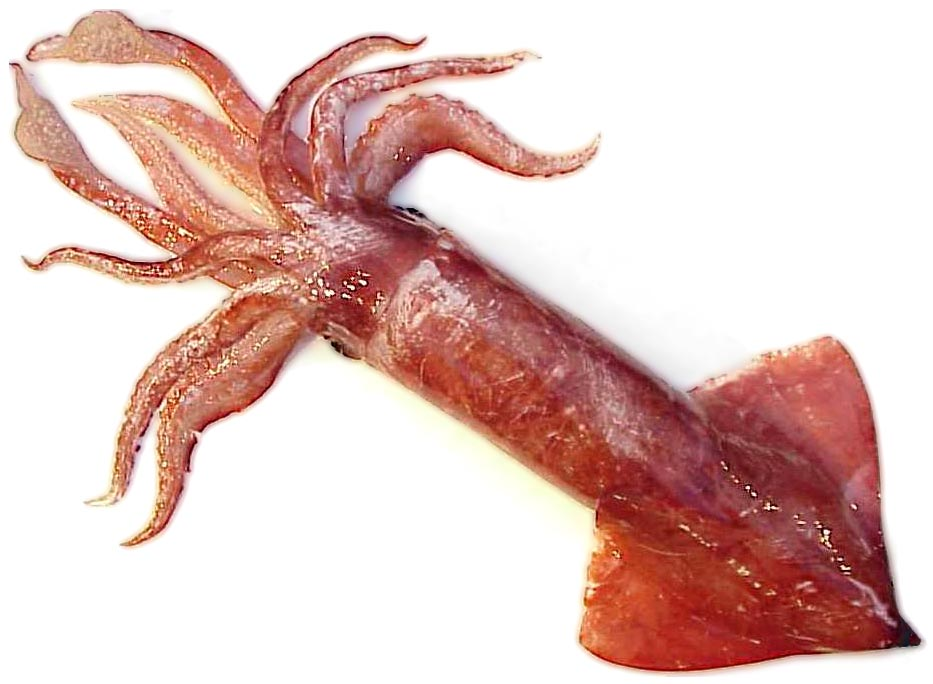
- Berryteuthis magister

Scientific classification
- Domain: Eukaryota
- Kingdom: Animalia
- Phylum: Mollusca
- Class: Cephalopoda
- Order: Oegopsida
- Family: Gonatidae
- Genus: Berryteuthis; Naef, 1921

Type species
- Gonatus magister Berry, 1913

Species
- See text

= Berryteuthis =

Berryteuthis Temporal range: Pliocene - recent

Genus of squids

Berryteuthis is a genus of squid in the family Gonatidae, comprising two known species. The two members differ greatly in size, with B. anonychus and B. magister reaching mature mantle lengths of 10 cm (3.9 in) and 40 cm (16 in) respectively. In both members, photophores are absent.

== Species ==
- Berryteuthis anonychus (Pearcy & Voss, 1963), minimal armhook squid
- Berryteuthis magister (Berry, 1913)
  - Berryteuthis magister magister, magister armhook squid
  - Berryteuthis magister nipponensis
  - Berryteuthis magister shevtsovi
