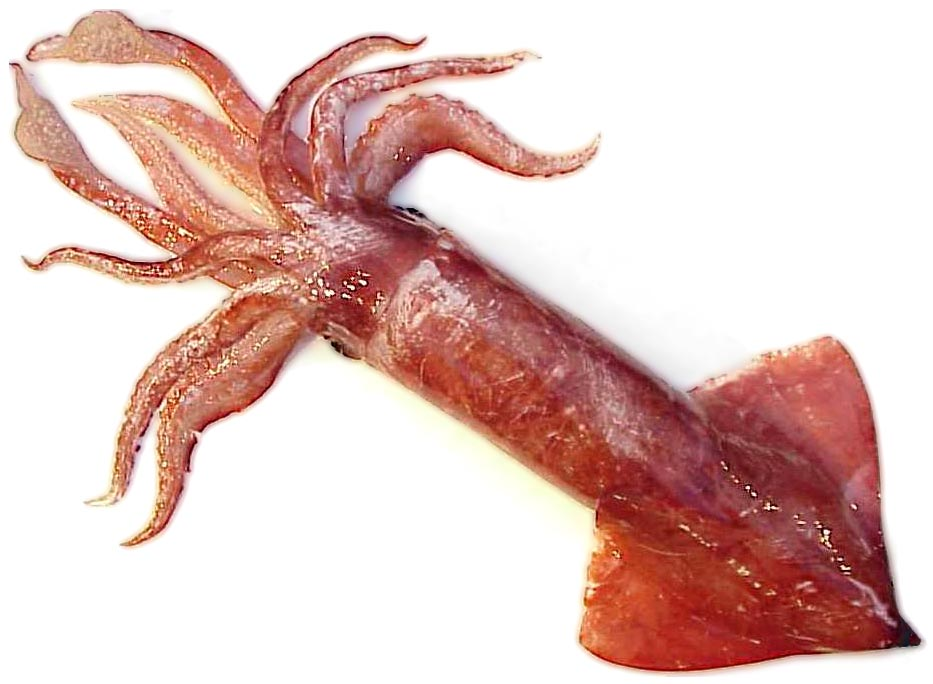

Conservation status
- Least Concern (IUCN 3.1)

Scientific classification
- Kingdom: Animalia
- Phylum: Mollusca
- Class: Cephalopoda
- Order: Oegopsida
- Family: Gonatidae
- Genus: Berryteuthis
- Species: B. magister

Binomial name
- Berryteuthis magister (Berry), 1913

Subspecies
- B. m. magister (Berry, 1913); B. m. nipponensis T. Okutani & T. Kubodera, 1987; B. m. shevtsovi Katugin, 2000

Synonyms
- Gonatus magister Berry, 1913; Gonatus septemdentatus Sasaki, 1915

= Berryteuthis magister =

Magister armhook squid

Species of squid

Berryteuthis magister, also known as the magister armhook squid, commander squid or schoolmaster gonate squid, is a medium-sized squid in the family Gonatidae. It is found in cold, high latitude waters of the North Pacific where it is among the most numerous squid species recorded.

There are three recognised subspecies of B. magister. The type locality of all three is Japan, although specimens have been recorded as far east as the Aleutian Islands.

== Description ==
The cylindrical bodies of magister armhook squid are muscular with very soft reddish brown skin. Like all gonatids, the suckers of their arms are arranged in four rows or series. But unlike other gonatids it is in females only that the suckers are modified into hooks; these hooks are on the mesial rows of the dorsal arms only. The clubs at the end of both tentacles are covered in 20 rows of suckers; these are smaller in B. magister nipponensis.

The wing-like fins at the rear of the body are rather large and may reach up to 50 percent of the mantle length. The fins are also smaller in B. magister nipponensis.

B. magister magister is known to reach a mantle length of 25 centimetres (10 in); total body length may exceed 61 centimetres (2 ft). Both B. magister nipponensis and B. magister shevtsovi are somewhat smaller, with a maximum mantle length of 17–20 centimetres (7–8 in). Females are slightly larger than males.

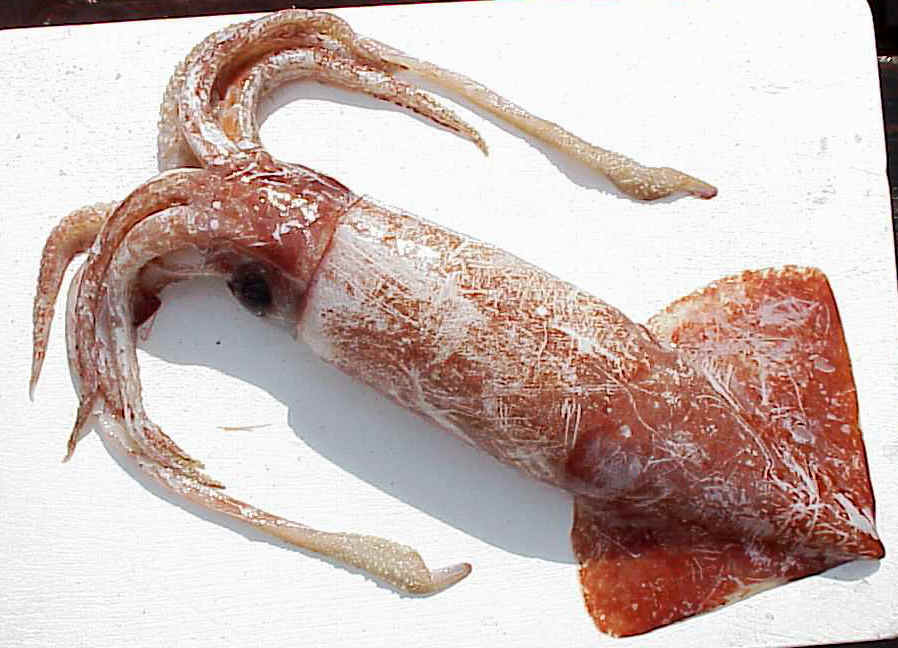
Ventral view

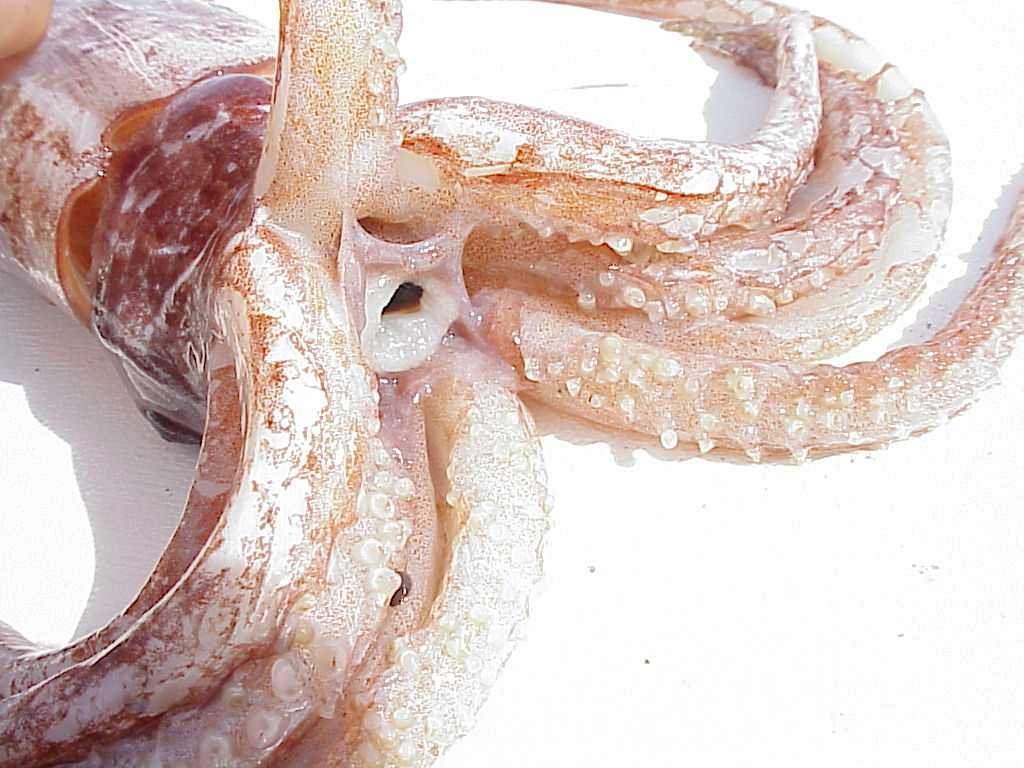
Oral view

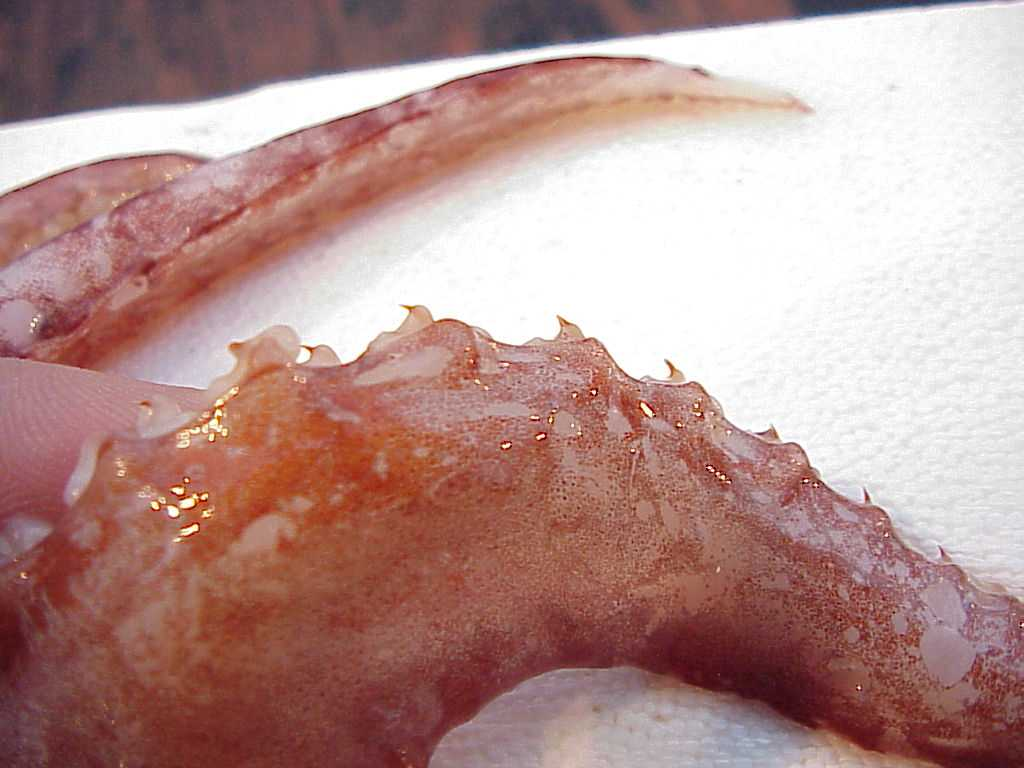
Close-up of hooks
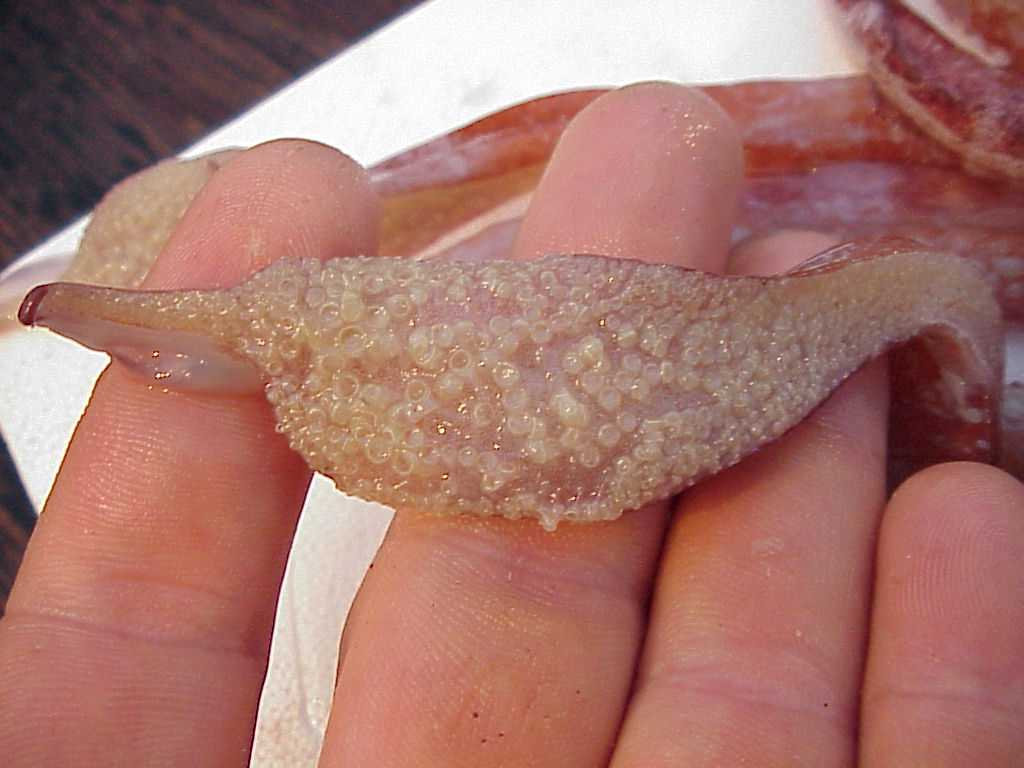
Tentacular club

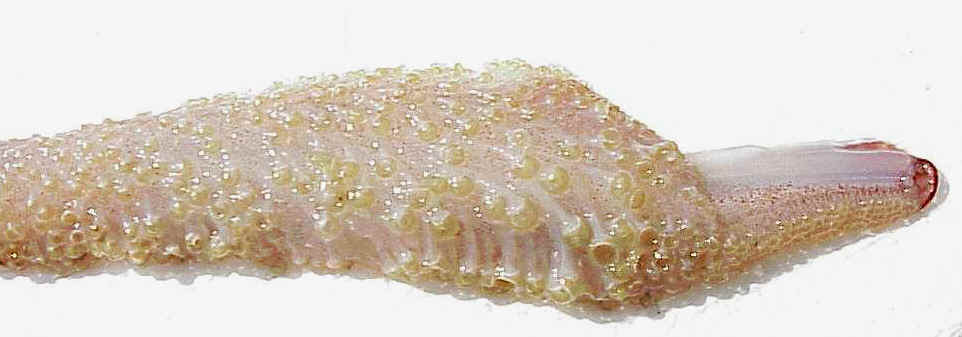
Tentacular club

== Habitat and behaviour ==
These squid are pelagic, roaming as deep as 1,000 metres and are associated with the continental shelf. Like other species in their family, Magister Armhook Squids are thought to undertake diel migration; by day the squid remain in the blackness of the depths. By night, they ascend to the upper layers of the water column to feed by starlight. An internal balancing organ called a statocyst ensures graceful movement.

Magister armhook squid prey upon both benthic and pelagic species; sculpins, smaller fish such as Sablefish and juvenile pollock, crustaceans including euphausiids and amphipods, and other squid. Cannibalism is also known to occur among the Magisters.

Baird's beaked whale, the short-finned pilot whale, false killer whale, Dall's porpoise and sperm whales are all known to feed upon magister armhook squid. Other predators include seabirds, northern fur seals, grenadiers, halibut and several species of salmon.
