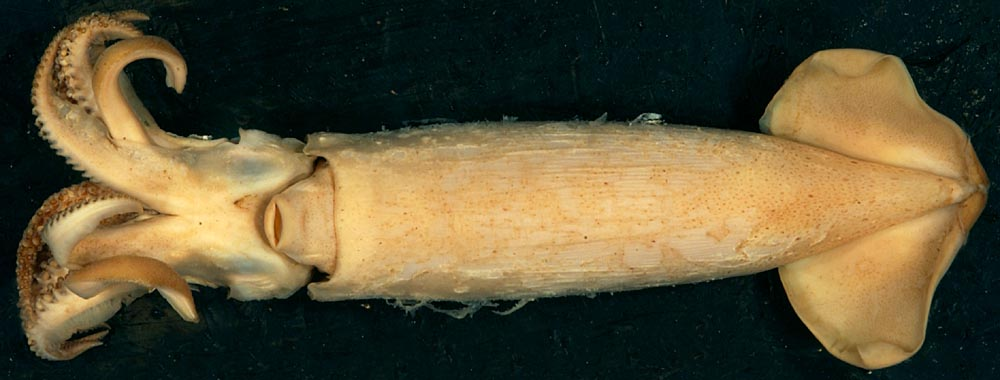

Conservation status
- Least Concern (IUCN 3.1)

Scientific classification
- Kingdom: Animalia
- Phylum: Mollusca
- Class: Cephalopoda
- Order: Oegopsida
- Family: Gonatidae
- Genus: Berryteuthis
- Species: B. anonychus

Binomial name
- Berryteuthis anonychus (Pearcy & Voss, 1963)

Synonyms
- Gonatus anonychus Pearcy & Voss, 1963

= Berryteuthis anonychus =

Species of squid

Berryteuthis anonychus, also known as the minimal armhook squid or smallfin gonate squid, is a species of squid in the family Gonatidae. It is distinguished from other gonatids by the lack of hooks on all members, except for females on the base of arms I to III.
