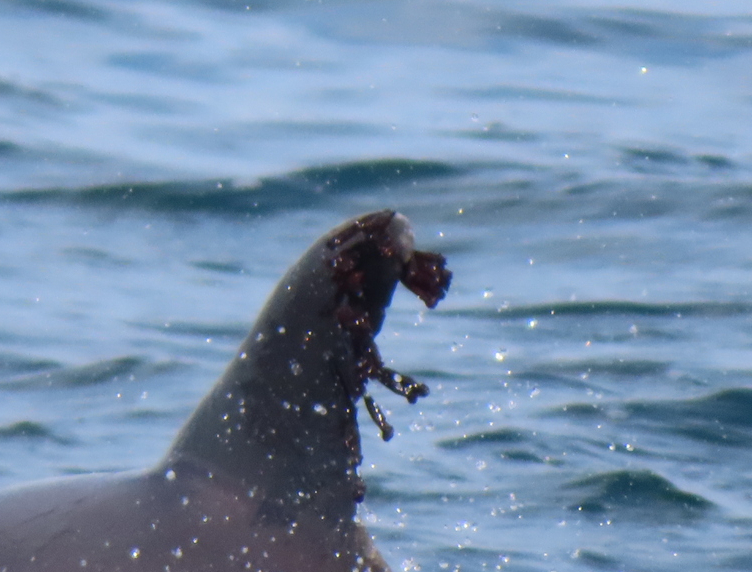

Scientific classification
- Kingdom: Animalia
- Phylum: Arthropoda
- Class: Thecostraca
- Subclass: Cirripedia
- Order: Balanomorpha
- Family: Coronulidae
- Genus: Xenobalanus
- Species: X. globicipitis

Binomial name
- Xenobalanus globicipitis Steenstrup, 1852

= Xenobalanus globicipitis =

Species of crustaceans

Xenobalanus globicipitis is a species of pseudo-stalked barnacle. It is usually spotted on the appendages of at least 34 species of cetaceans, commonly baleen whales and bottlenose dolphins. This species is not technically a true stalked barnacle, hence the 'pseudo' in its name.

== Description ==
The creature is dark in coloration and up to 5 cm (2.0 in) long. It hangs from tails, dorsal fins, flippers, and less commonly rostrums and baleen plates/teeth. In a sample population of the dolphin Stenella coeruleoalba, by far the most frequent site of occurrence were the flukes. This animal is native to tropical, subtropical, and temperate waters around the world. It can cluster in various amounts, from one to one hundred, depending on the size and the animal and where on it they've adhered. These creatures are "sessile" — once they latch on with the shell base, they don't move off unless they need to (for example, if the water gets too cold for them). They burrow themselves into the skin and blubber of their host, though they are not technically parasitic and instead engage in phoresis.

== Feeding ==
X. globicipitis takes advantage of the migratory movements of marine mammals, using their motion and location to feed on plankton without having to do the locomotion themselves. It feeds through suspension techniques.
