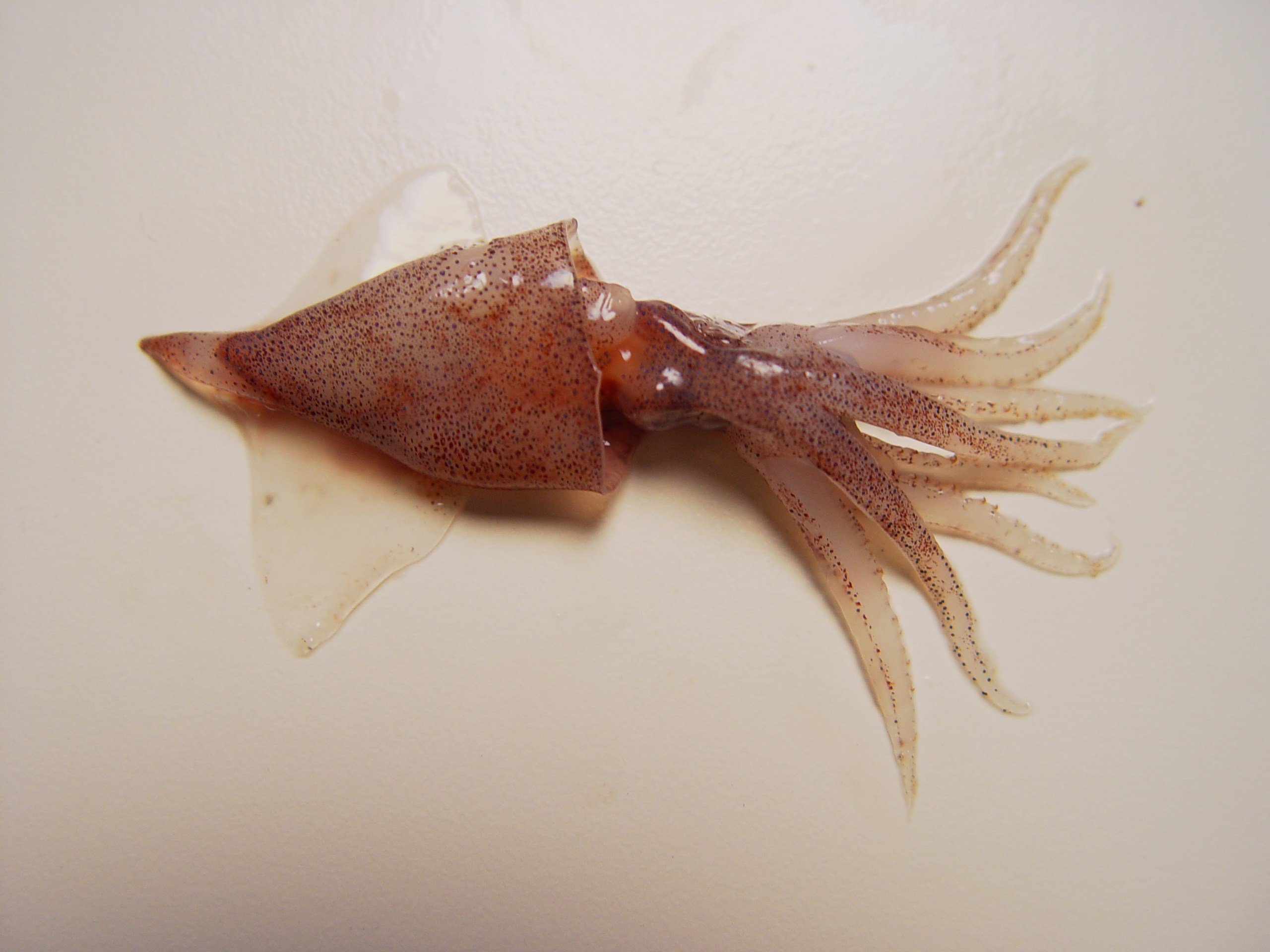

Conservation status
- Least Concern (IUCN 3.1)

Scientific classification
- Kingdom: Animalia
- Phylum: Mollusca
- Class: Cephalopoda
- Order: Oegopsida
- Family: Enoploteuthidae
- Genus: Abralia
- Subgenus: Pygmabralia
- Species: A. redfieldi

Binomial name
- Abralia redfieldi Voss, 1955

= Abralia redfieldi =

Species of mollusc

Abralia redfieldi is a species of enoploteuthid cephalopod ranging across the Atlantic Ocean from the waters of Nova Scotia to Argentina in the west, to the waters of western Africa south to South Africa in the east. It has been caught at depths of 50–100 m at night, and is preyed upon by dwarf sperm whales.

It is similar in appearance to the Pacific Ocean species, Abralia similis.
