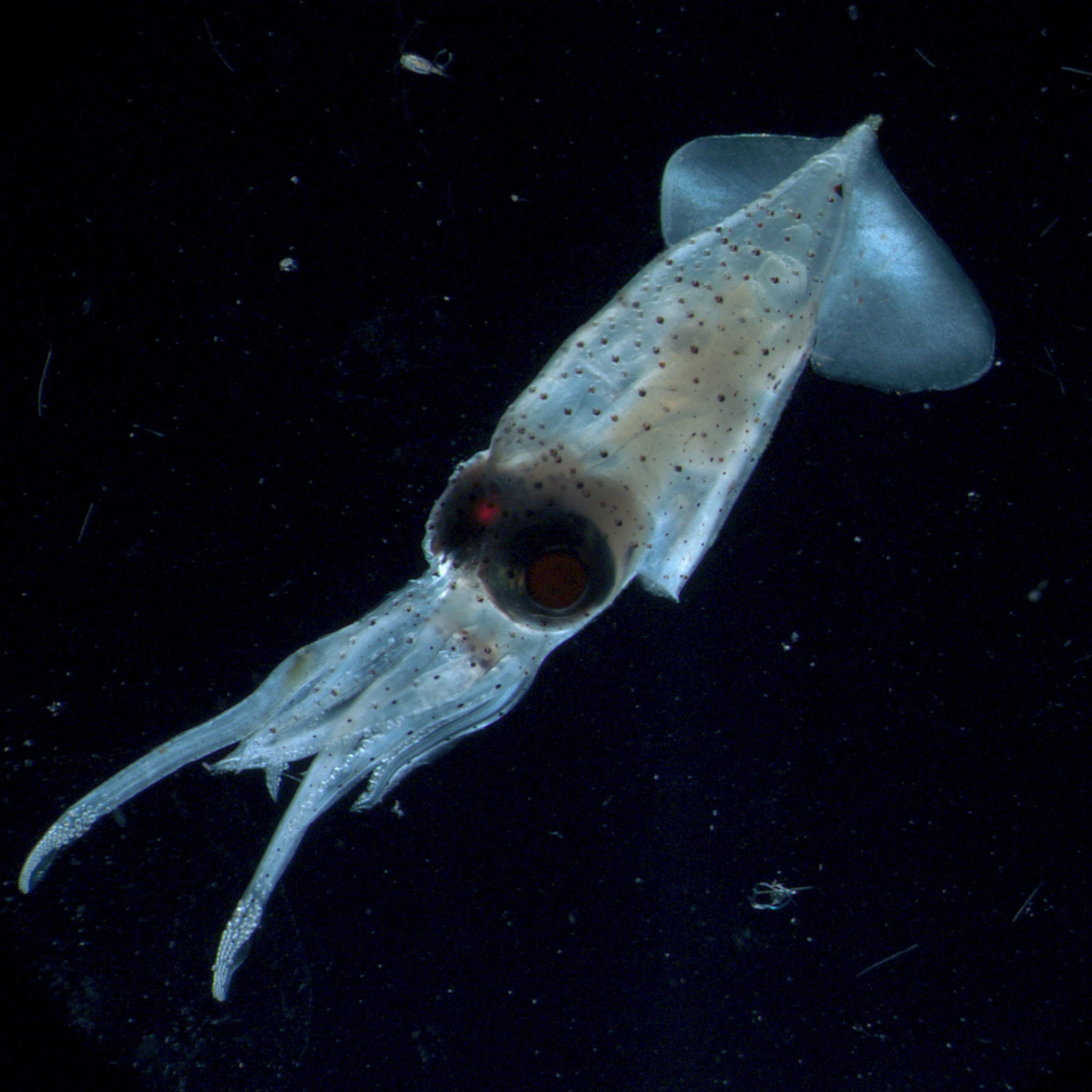
- Enoploteuthis sp., Celebes Sea
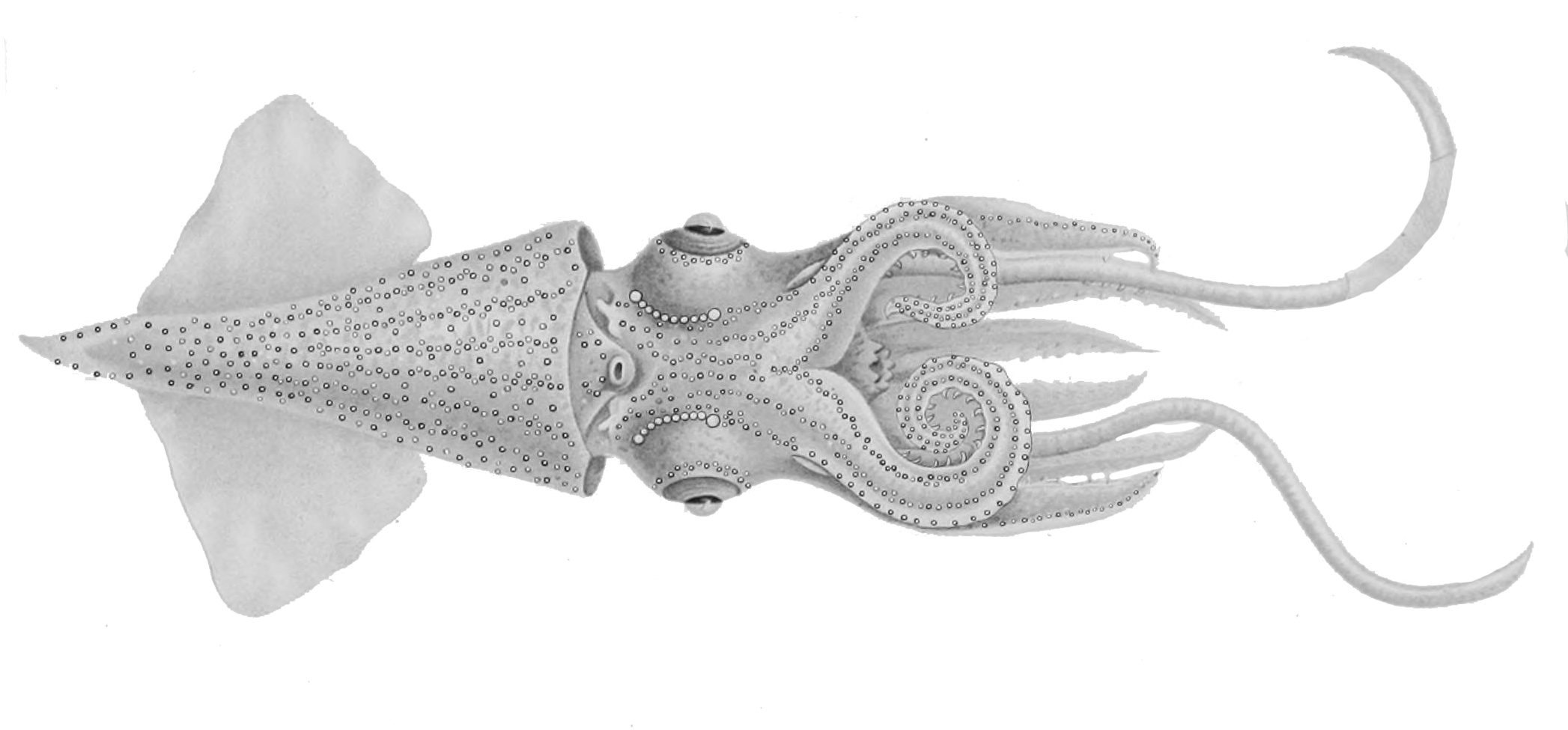
- Enoploteuthis leptura

Scientific classification
- Kingdom: Animalia
- Phylum: Mollusca
- Class: Cephalopoda
- Order: Oegopsida
- Family: Enoploteuthidae
- Genus: Enoploteuthis; Orbigny in Rüppell, 1844

Type species
- Loligo lepturo Leach, 1817

Species
- See text.

= Enoploteuthis =

Genus of squids

Enoploteuthis is a genus of squid in the family Enoploteuthidae, being the type genus. Enoploteuthis is a genus with a relatively high number of species, most of which were described in the late 20th and early 21st century. They have been collected during exploratory trawling in the mesopelagic zone. They are an important food source for fishes and toothed whales but they are of little commercial value, except for Enoploteuthis chunii which is caught as bycatch in the Japanese fishery for Watasenia scintillans. Many species are diel migrants, spending the day at depth and moving up the water column at night to feed.

== Description ==
The species of Enoploteuthis are most easily recognised by having a larger "tail" (trailing part of the mantle) when compared to the other genera in the Enoploteuthidae. The tail's size is emphasized by not having the fins extending along its sides. In related genera there is a narrow extension of the fins along the tail. Other characteristics include the presence of suckers on the distal portion of arms IV where there at no photophores present; the tentacular club has two rows of hooks and no marginal suckers; on the buccal crown there are typical chromatophores on the aboral surface but on the oral surface there may be some light skin pigmentation. They have 9–10 photophores on the eye and they have complex photophores in the skin. In the females the Spermatangia receptacles are at the posterior junction of muscles used to retract the funnel and the muscles which retract the head. Enoploteuthis differs from other genera of the Enoploteuthidae in having two rather than three types of photophores in its integument and these are on the ventral areas of the head, funnel and mantle. All species of Enoploteuthis which have been studied have the most complex type of photophore and seems to be a distinctive characteristic of this genus. Enoploteuthis contains the largest species in the family, attaining a mantle length of 130mm.

== Species ==
The following valid species are currently recognised:

- Enoploteuthis leptura (Leach, 1817)
- Enoploteuthis magnoceani Nesis, 1982
- Enoploteuthis obliqua Burgess, 1982
- Enoploteuthis octolineata Burgess, 1982
- Enoploteuthis reticulata Rancurel, 1970
- Enoploteuthis anapsis Roper, 1964
- Enoploteuthis chunii Ishikawa, 1914
- Enoploteuthis galaxias Berry, 1918
- Enoploteuthis higginsi Burgess, 1982
- Enoploteuthis jonesi Burgess, 1982
- Enoploteuthis semilineata Alexeyev, 1994

These species are sometimes divided into two subgenera Enoploteuthis and Paraenoploteuthis.
