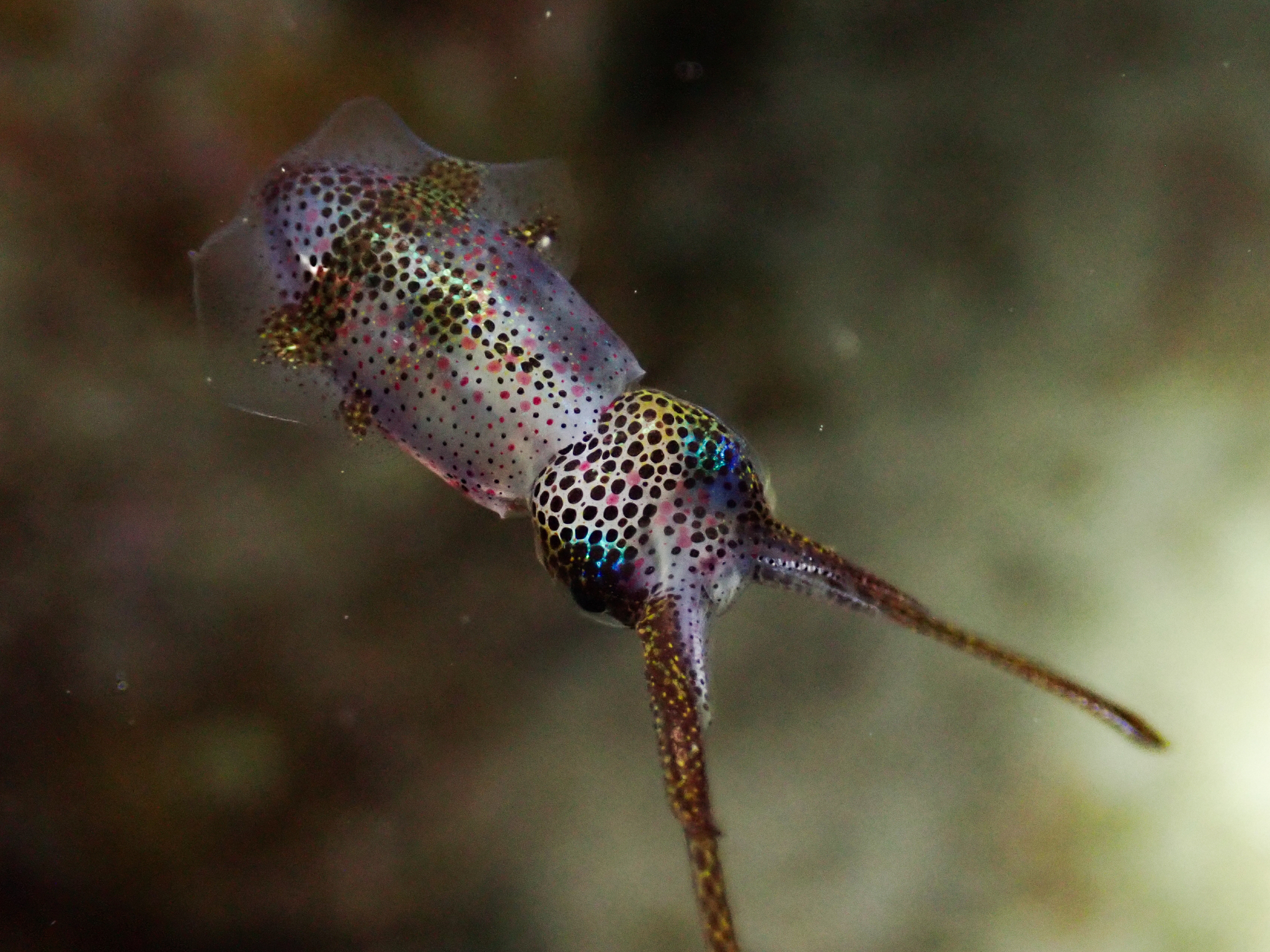

Scientific classification
- Kingdom: Animalia
- Phylum: Mollusca
- Class: Cephalopoda
- Order: Myopsida
- Family: Loliginidae
- Genus: Pickfordiateuthis; Voss, 1953

Type species
- Pickfordiateuthis pulchella Voss, 1953

Species
- Pickfordiateuthis bayeri Roper & Vecchione, 2001; Pickfordiateuthis pulchella Voss, 1953; Pickfordiateuthis vossi Brakoniecki, 1996; Pickfordiateuthis sp. A

= Pickfordiateuthis =

Genus of squids

Pickfordiateuthis is a genus of tiny squid in the family Loliginidae. While four species have been assigned to the genus, only three have been named. No member is known to reach a maximum mantle length of more than 22 mm (0.87 in).

The genus was erected in 1953 by Gilbert L. Voss, who named it in honour of biologist Grace Evelyn Pickford. Voss placed the sole species known at the time, P. pulchella, in its own family, Pickfordiateuthidae, but this was sunk in synonymy with Loliginidae by Thomas Brakoniecki in his 1996 revision of Pickfordiateuthis. Brakoniecki also described P. vossi as new and identified a third, unnamed species, P. sp. A. A fourth species, P. bayeri, was added in 2001 by Clyde Roper and Michael Vecchione.
