= Abralia robsoni =

Conservation status
- Data Deficient (IUCN 3.1)

Scientific classification
- Domain: Eukaryota
- Kingdom: Animalia
- Phylum: Mollusca
- Class: Cephalopoda
- Order: Oegopsida
- Family: Enoploteuthidae
- Genus: Abralia
- Subgenus: Heterabralia
- Species: A. robsoni

Binomial name
- Abralia robsoni Grimpe, 1931

Species of mollusc

Abralia robsoni is a species of enoploteuthid cephalopod found in the waters of Japan. It may be synonymous with A. andamanica.
