= Abralia grimpei =

Conservation status
- Data Deficient (IUCN 3.1)

Scientific classification
- Domain: Eukaryota
- Kingdom: Animalia
- Phylum: Mollusca
- Class: Cephalopoda
- Order: Oegopsida
- Family: Enoploteuthidae
- Genus: Abralia
- Subgenus: Pygmabralia
- Species: A. grimpei

Binomial name
- Abralia grimpei Voss, 1959

Species of mollusc

Abralia grimpei is a species of enoploteuthid cephalopod known from the western North Atlantic Ocean, including the West Indies and the Sargasso Sea. It is recognizable from other Abralia species by the extra photophores on its eyes.
