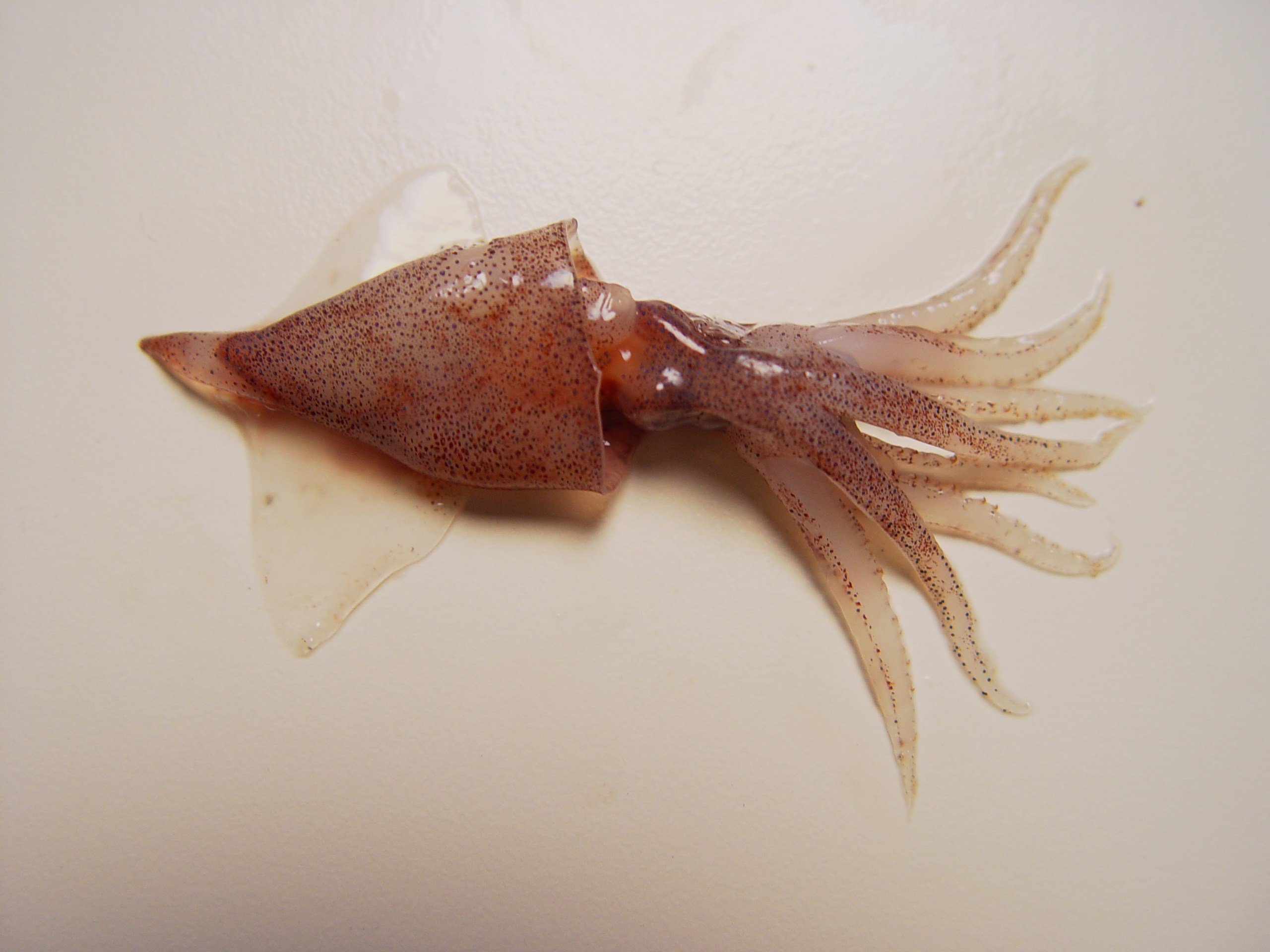
- Abralia redfieldi

Scientific classification
- Kingdom: Animalia
- Phylum: Mollusca
- Class: Cephalopoda
- Order: Oegopsida
- Family: Enoploteuthidae
- Genus: Abralia; Gray, 1849

Type species
- Onychoteuthis armatus Quoy & Gaimard, 1832

Subgenera
- Abralia; Asteroteuthis; Astrabralia; Enigmoteuthis; Heterabralia; Pygmabralia

= Abralia =

Genus of molluscs

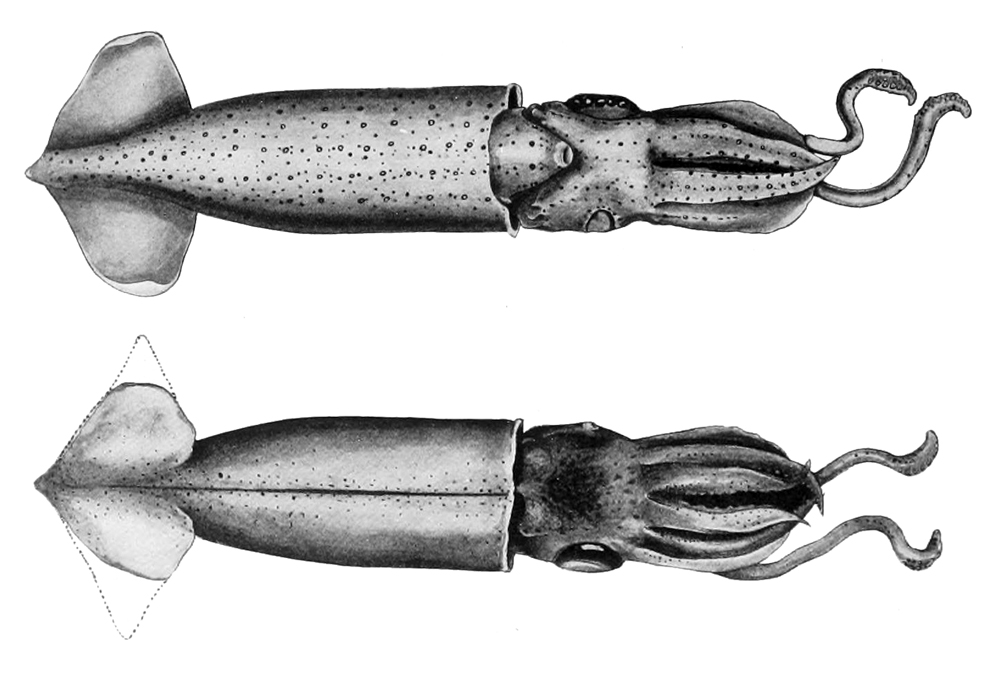
Abralia astrosticta

Abralia is a genus of squid comprising around 20 species from the family Enoploteuthidae. They are small squid which can be found in the epipelagic to mesopelagic zones while some species are found in water with shallow substrates on steep slopes on the boundary of the mesopelagic zone. They are distinguished from other members of the Enoploteuthidae by not normally having large, black photophores at the tips of arms IV, although if these are present they are not covered in black chromatophores, and having fins which extend beyond their tail. The photophores of the integument are characteristicand are found in the three types . "Lensed" photophores are a blue color with a white ring, "simple" photophores are small and violet-colored and the "complex" photophores are surrounded by small green satellite points and have a green centre. The complex photophores will frequently appear to be blue depending on their physiological state. The integument also has small black chromatophores which look like dots. They have 5–12 variably sized photophores on the eye. Either the right or left arm IV is hectocotylized.

Abralia is the most speciose genus in the Enoploteuthidae and is normally divided in to six subgenera, however, recent studies suggest that these may not form natural groupings. They have worldwide distribution in tropical and subtropical seas. They spend the day at depths below 600m and at night they move to less than 200m in depth. These quid are important prey species for large fish such as tuna and billfish as well as toothed whales.

== Species ==
The following species are currently recognised and are divided into six subgenera:

- Subgenus Abralia Gray, 1849
  - Abralia armata (Quoy & Gaimard, 1832)
  - Abralia multihamata Sasaki, 1929
  - Abralia renschi Grimpe, 1931
  - Abralia spaercki Grimpe, 1931
  - Abralia steindachneri Weindl, 1912
- Subgenus Asteroteuthis Pfeffer, 1908
  - Abralia veranyi Rüppell, 1844, eye-flash squid or Verany's enope squid
- Subgenus Astrabralia Nesis, 1987
  - Abralia astrolineata Berry, 1914
  - Abralia astrosticta Berry, 1909
- Subgenus Enigmoteuthis Adam, 1973
  - Abralia dubia Adam, 1960
  - Abralia fasciolata Tsuchiya, 1991
  - Abralia marisarabica Okutani, 1983
- Subgenus Heterabralia Tsuchiya & Okutani, 1988
  - Abralia andamanica Goodrich, 1896
  - Abralia heminuchalis Burgess, 1992
  - Abralia robsoni Grimpe, 1931
  - Abralia siedleckyi Lipinski, 1983
  - Abralia trigonura Berry, 1913
- Subgenus Pygmabralia Nesis, 1987
  - Abralia grimpei Voss, 1959
  - Abralia omiae Hidaka & Kubodera, 2000
  - Abralia redfieldi Voss, 1955
  - Abralia similis Okutani & Tsuchiya, 1987
