= Abralia multihamata =

Conservation status
- Data Deficient (IUCN 3.1)

Scientific classification
- Domain: Eukaryota
- Kingdom: Animalia
- Phylum: Mollusca
- Class: Cephalopoda
- Order: Oegopsida
- Family: Enoploteuthidae
- Genus: Abralia
- Subgenus: Abralia
- Species: A. multihamata

Binomial name
- Abralia multihamata Sasaki, 1929

Synonyms
- Abralia lucens Voss, 1962

Species of mollusc

Abralia multihamata is a species of enoploteuthid cephalopod native to the Northwest Pacific Ocean. Specifically, it occurs in the East China Sea, Sea of Japan and Sagami Bay. The taxonomic relationship between A. multihamata and A. spaercki needs to be resolved. It may spawn in the East China Sea, as large numbers of spent individuals are collected there in October.
