= Pickfordiateuthis sp. A =

Scientific classification
- Kingdom: Animalia
- Phylum: Mollusca
- Class: Cephalopoda
- Order: Myopsida
- Family: Loliginidae
- Genus: Pickfordiateuthis
- Species: P. sp. A

Binomial name
- Pickfordiateuthis sp. A Brakoniecki, 1996

Species of squid

Pickfordiateuthis sp. A is an unnamed species of squid in the family Loliginidae. It was discussed by Thomas Brakoniecki in his 1996 revision of Pickfordiateuthis, who mentioned that it may be a subspecies of P. pulchella. The specimens gathered were only females, from the tropical eastern Pacific Ocean.

== Description ==
Pickfordiateuthis sp. A is described as having a short, stout, and blunt mantle of 7.9 to 11.9 mm in length. Its fins are large and round, over a half of the length of the mantle. Chromatophores were reported as not being present on the visceral membrane.
