= Abralia renschi =

Conservation status
- Data Deficient (IUCN 3.1)

Scientific classification
- Kingdom: Animalia
- Phylum: Mollusca
- Class: Cephalopoda
- Order: Oegopsida
- Family: Enoploteuthidae
- Genus: Abralia
- Subgenus: Abralia
- Species: A. renschi

Binomial name
- Abralia renschi Grimpe, 1931

Species of mollusc

Abralia renschi is a species of enoploteuthid cephalopod found in the waters of Sumatra, Java and the Maldives. It may be a subspecies of A. steindachneri.
