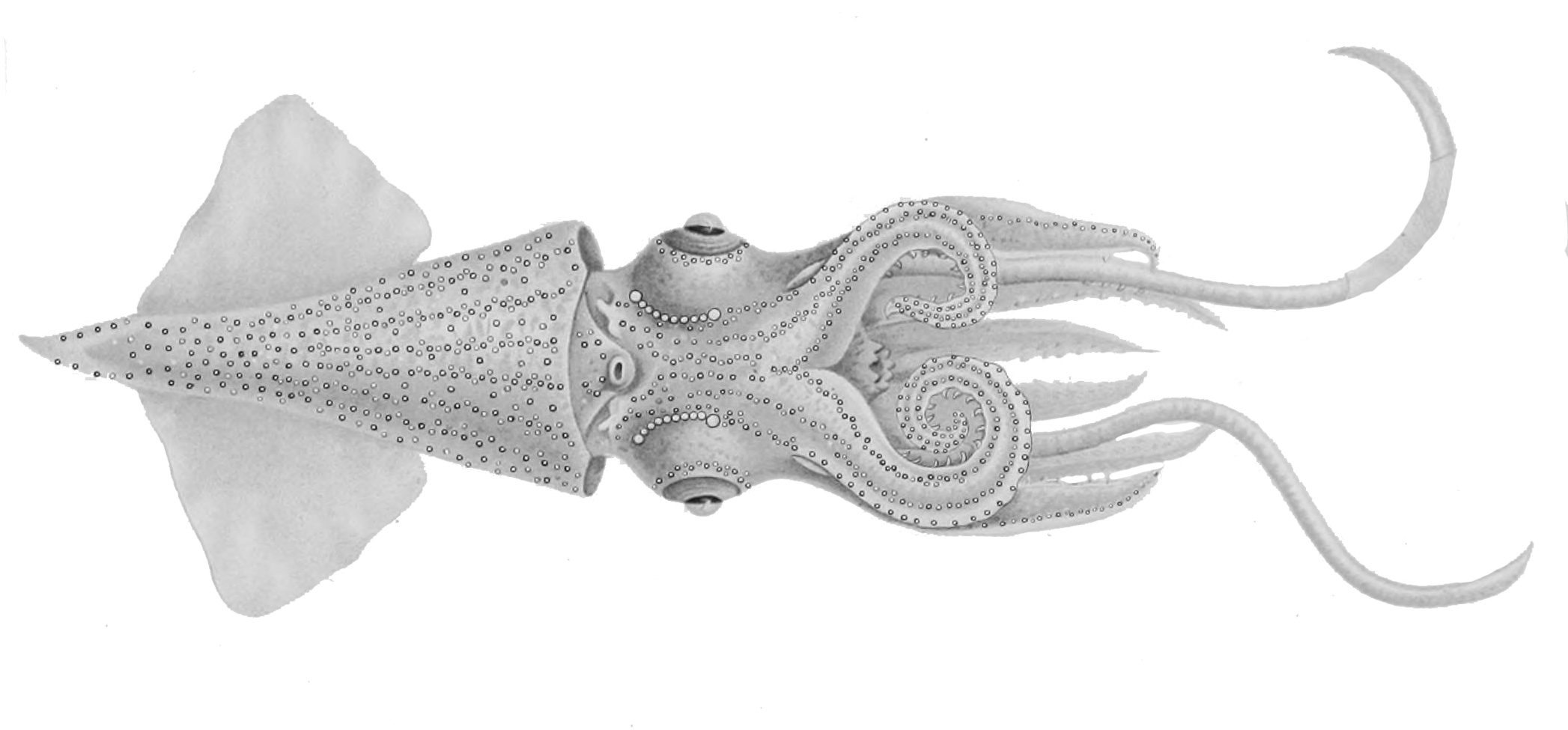

Conservation status
- Least Concern (IUCN 3.1)

Scientific classification
- Kingdom: Animalia
- Phylum: Mollusca
- Class: Cephalopoda
- Order: Oegopsida
- Family: Enoploteuthidae
- Genus: Enoploteuthis
- Species: E. leptura

Binomial name
- Enoploteuthis leptura (Leach, 1817)

Synonyms
- Loligo lepturo Leach, 1817; Loligo smythii Leach, 1817

= Enoploteuthis leptura =

Species of squid

Enoploteuthis leptura, the hooked enope squid, is a species of squid from the family Enoploteuthidae. It is the type species of the genus Enoploteuthis, which is in turn the type genus of the Enoploteuthidae.

== Description ==
Enoploteuthis leptura have hooks on their arms, less on arms I-III than on arms IV, the males have many tiny papillae covering the oral surfaces of arms I-III. In males right arm IV is hectocotylised and has a flap created by an expansion of the ventral protective membrane and there are about six pairs of hooks on the distal third of the arm on the opposite side to the flap. On the dorsal side the protective membrane expands a little to create a series of small flaps on the other side of the arm from the large flap made by the ventral membrane. The tentacles are long and slender and the tentacular club is narrow with two rows of hooks on its manus, a ventral series having 6-7 large hooks and a dorsal series with 4-5 smaller hooks. The dactylus has 10-15 suckers in two series and there is a long, thin carpal cluster. The ventral mantle has six series of complex photophores on the anterior integument with a seventh series which curves either to the left or right to join with one of the nearby series and so does not extend to the anterior mantle margin. On the ventral, anterior edge of the mantle there is a discontinuous row of photophoresin which the gaps correspond to the spaces between the series of photophores on the mantle. The ventral surface of the head has six series of photophoresin which the outermost series are interrupted by a ventral window in the skin. There are no photophores between these ventral windows and the photophores on the eyelids. They grow to a mantle length of 92mm.

== Distribution ==
Enoploteuthis leptura has been recorded from the Gulf of Guinea, the eastern and western central Atlantic Ocean from Bermuda and Madeira in the north to Brazil and southwestern Africa in the south. The Indo-Pacific species Enoploteuthis magnoceani is considered by some authorities to be a subspecies of E. leptura.

== Habitat and Biology ==
Enoploteuthis lepturais a mesopelagic squid which occurs in the warmer water areas of the Atlantic. Increment analysis of statolith growth of specimens collected from the Gulf of Guinea showed that it has a short life span of approximately 6 months with individuals attaining sexual maturity in 45–60 days in males and 80–90 days in females. The maximum age is 153 days for mature males and they had grown to 72mm mantle length with females living to 143 days and attaining a mantle length of 92mm. Spawning occurs throughout much of the year up to September in the Gulf of Guinea with two peaks occurring in January and June–July. This species is a vertical diel migrant, i.e. they spend the day at depths and move upwards towards the water surface at night to feed.
