= Abralia fasciolata =

Conservation status
- Data Deficient (IUCN 3.1)

Scientific classification
- Domain: Eukaryota
- Kingdom: Animalia
- Phylum: Mollusca
- Class: Cephalopoda
- Order: Oegopsida
- Family: Enoploteuthidae
- Genus: Abralia
- Subgenus: Enigmoteuthis
- Species: A. fasciolata

Binomial name
- Abralia fasciolata Tsuchiya, 1991

Species of mollusc

Abralia fasciolata is a species of enoploteuthid cephalopod that is only known from the Gulf of Aqaba. Mature males can reach a mantle length of 27 mm, with spermatophores 3–3.5 mm in length.
