= Enoploteuthis galaxias =

Conservation status
- Data Deficient (IUCN 3.1)

Scientific classification
- Kingdom: Animalia
- Phylum: Mollusca
- Class: Cephalopoda
- Order: Oegopsida
- Family: Enoploteuthidae
- Genus: Enoploteuthis
- Species: E. galaxias

Binomial name
- Enoploteuthis galaxias (Berry, 1918)

Species of squid

Enoploteuthis galaxias (Galaxy Squid) is a species of squid from the family Enoploteuthidae. The species has been observed off the coast of Tasmania.
