= Abralia dubia =

Conservation status
- Data Deficient (IUCN 3.1)

Scientific classification
- Domain: Eukaryota
- Kingdom: Animalia
- Phylum: Mollusca
- Class: Cephalopoda
- Order: Oegopsida
- Family: Enoploteuthidae
- Genus: Abralia
- Subgenus: Enigmoteuthis
- Species: A. dubia

Binomial name
- Abralia dubia (Adam, 1960)

Synonyms
- Enoploteuthis dubia Adam, 1960; Enigmoteuthis dubia (Adam, 1960)

Species of mollusc

Abralia dubia is a species of enoploteuthid cephalopod known from the Red Sea.
