= Abralia omiae =

Conservation status
- Data Deficient (IUCN 3.1)

Scientific classification
- Kingdom: Animalia
- Phylum: Mollusca
- Class: Cephalopoda
- Order: Oegopsida
- Family: Enoploteuthidae
- Genus: Abralia
- Subgenus: Pygmabralia
- Species: A. omiae

Binomial name
- Abralia omiae Hidaka & Kubodera, 2000

Species of mollusc

Abralia omiae is a species of enoploteuthid cephalopod known only from its type locality, the Dimitry Mendeleyev seamount (5˚N, 155˚E) in the Pacific tropics. A. omiae is a small species, less than 3 cm in mantle length.
