= Enoploteuthis octolineata =

Conservation status
- Data Deficient (IUCN 3.1)

Scientific classification
- Kingdom: Animalia
- Phylum: Mollusca
- Class: Cephalopoda
- Order: Oegopsida
- Family: Enoploteuthidae
- Genus: Enoploteuthis
- Species: E. octolineata

Binomial name
- Enoploteuthis octolineata (Burgess, 1982)

Species of squid

Enoploteuthis octolineata is a species of squid from the family Enoploteuthidae. The species has been observed off the coast of Kiribati in the South Pacific Ocean.
