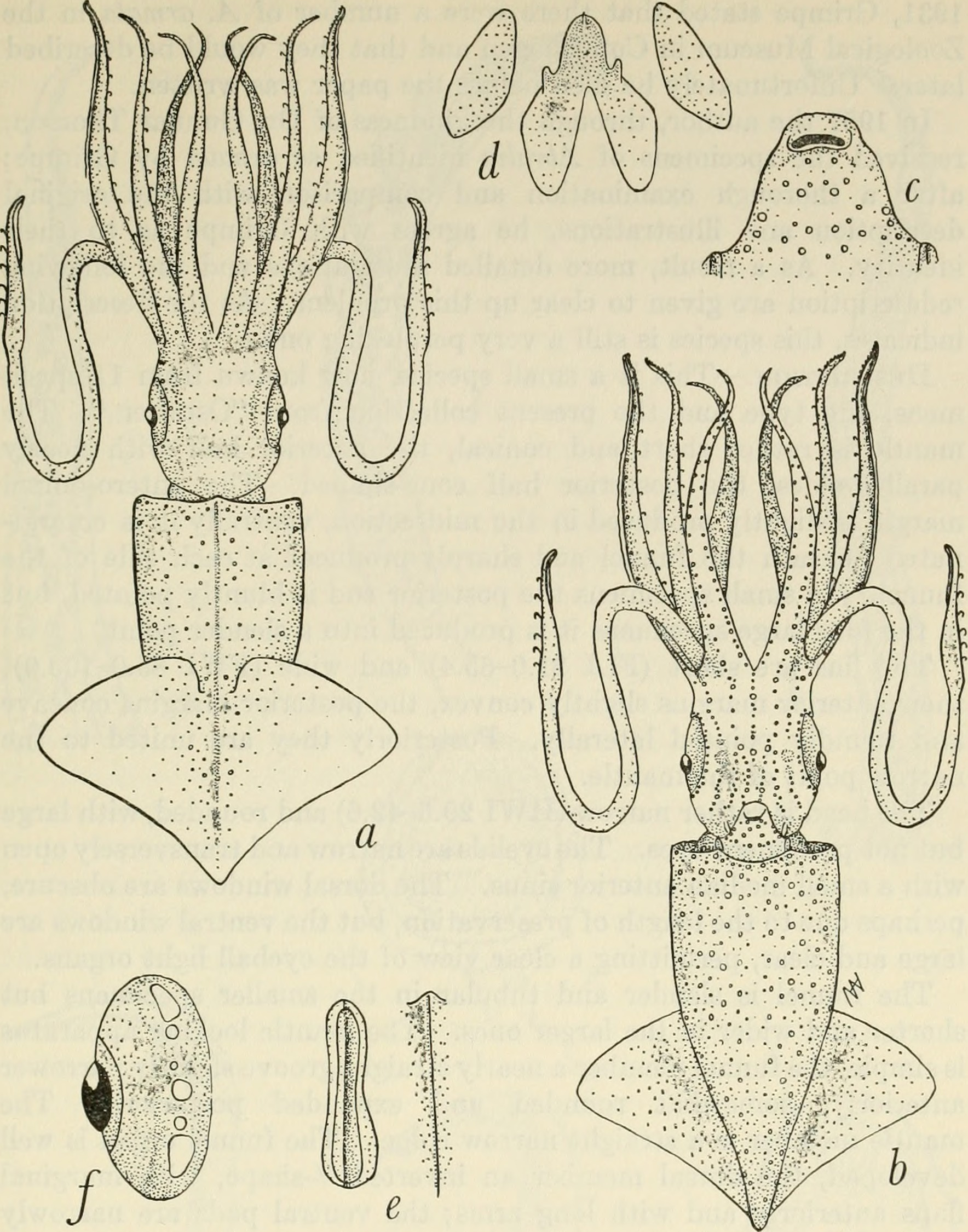

Conservation status
- Data Deficient (IUCN 3.1)

Scientific classification
- Domain: Eukaryota
- Kingdom: Animalia
- Phylum: Mollusca
- Class: Cephalopoda
- Order: Oegopsida
- Family: Enoploteuthidae
- Genus: Abralia
- Subgenus: Abralia
- Species: A. armata

Binomial name
- Abralia armata (Quoy & Gaimard, 1832)

Synonyms
- Onychoteuthis armatus Quoy & Gaimard, 1832

= Abralia armata =

Species of squid

Abralia armata is a species of squid in the family Enoploteuthidae. It is native to waters of Indonesia and the Philippines. A. armata is reported to grow to mantle lengths of up to 2 cm.
