= Enoploteuthis magnoceani =

Conservation status
- Data Deficient (IUCN 3.1)

Scientific classification
- Kingdom: Animalia
- Phylum: Mollusca
- Class: Cephalopoda
- Order: Oegopsida
- Family: Enoploteuthidae
- Genus: Enoploteuthis
- Species: E. magnoceani

Binomial name
- Enoploteuthis magnoceani (Burgess, 1982)

Species of squid

Enoploteuthis magnoceani is a subspeciesof Enoploteuthis leptura from the family Enoploteuthidae. Some authorities consider Enoploteuthis magnoceani as being its own species, and has been observed in the Indo-Pacific Ocean.
