= Abralia marisarabica =

Conservation status
- Data Deficient (IUCN 3.1)

Scientific classification
- Kingdom: Animalia
- Phylum: Mollusca
- Class: Cephalopoda
- Order: Oegopsida
- Family: Enoploteuthidae
- Genus: Abralia
- Subgenus: Enigmoteuthis
- Species: A. marisarabica

Binomial name
- Abralia marisarabica Okutani, 1983

Species of mollusc

Abralia marisarabica is a species of enoploteuthid cephalopod that is endemic to the Arabian Sea. It may also be present in the Seychelles. It is one of the smallest Abralia species, growing to 19–22 mm (males) and 22–26 mm (females) in mantle lengths. There appears to be sexual dimorphism in the number of arm hooks present.
