= Pickfordiateuthis bayeri =

Conservation status
- Data Deficient (IUCN 3.1)

Scientific classification
- Kingdom: Animalia
- Phylum: Mollusca
- Class: Cephalopoda
- Order: Myopsida
- Family: Loliginidae
- Genus: Pickfordiateuthis
- Species: P. bayeri

Binomial name
- Pickfordiateuthis bayeri Roper & Vecchione, 2001

Species of squid

Pickfordiateuthis bayeri, or Bayer’s grass squid, is a species of squid in the family Loliginidae. It was discovered in 2001 in the Atlantic Ocean discovered by a submersible (Roper C.F.E. & Vecchione M).

A small squid, females of which are usually sized between 23 and 26 mm mantle length. P. bayeri is found in the western Atlantic Ocean, particularly in the Caribbean region. Specimens were collected from a swarm of squid at ~110 m depth.
