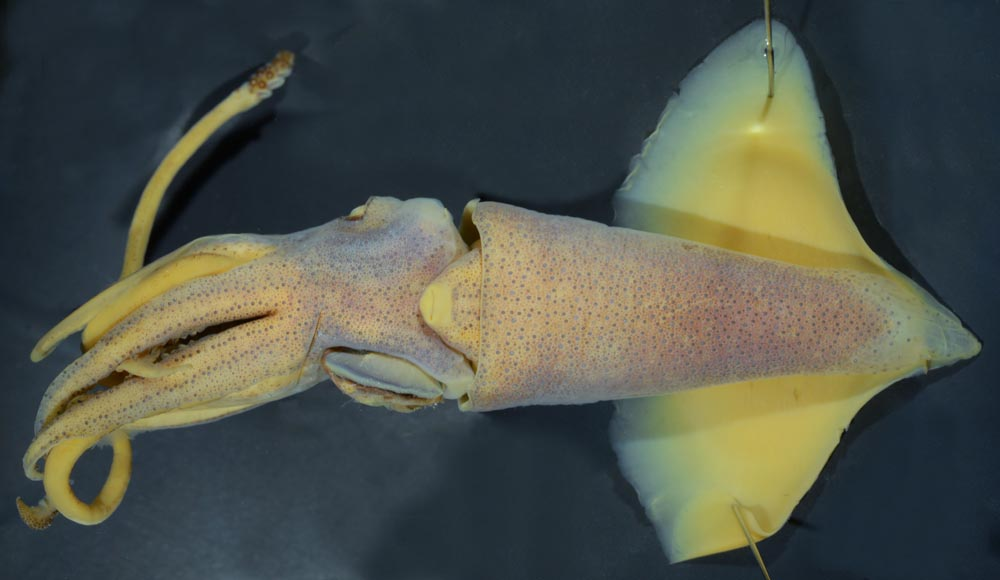

Conservation status
- Data Deficient (IUCN 3.1)

Scientific classification
- Domain: Eukaryota
- Kingdom: Animalia
- Phylum: Mollusca
- Class: Cephalopoda
- Order: Oegopsida
- Family: Enoploteuthidae
- Genus: Abralia
- Subgenus: Heterabralia
- Species: A. siedleckyi

Binomial name
- Abralia siedleckyi Lipinski, 1983

= Abralia siedleckyi =

Species of mollusc

Abralia siedleckyi is a species of enoploteuthid cephalopod known from its type locality in the waters off South Africa. It resembles A. heminuchalis, and may be synonymous with it.
