= Enoploteuthis higginsi =

Conservation status
- Least Concern (IUCN 3.1)

Scientific classification
- Kingdom: Animalia
- Phylum: Mollusca
- Class: Cephalopoda
- Order: Oegopsida
- Family: Enoploteuthidae
- Genus: Enoploteuthis
- Species: E. higginsi

Binomial name
- Enoploteuthis higginsi (Burgess, 1982)

Species of squid

Enoploteuthis higginsi is a species of squid from the family Enoploteuthidae. The species is gonochoric, and can be found in the Eastern Pacific Ocean. The mantle may grow up to 60mm.
