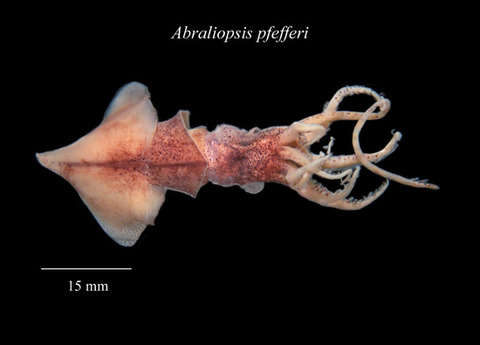

Conservation status
- Data Deficient (IUCN 3.1)

Scientific classification
- Domain: Eukaryota
- Kingdom: Animalia
- Phylum: Mollusca
- Class: Cephalopoda
- Order: Oegopsida
- Family: Enoploteuthidae
- Genus: Abraliopsis
- Subgenus: Abraliopsis
- Species: A. pfefferi

Binomial name
- Abraliopsis pfefferi (Joubin, 1896)

= Abraliopsis pfefferi =

Species of mollusc

Abraliopsis pfefferi, also known as Pfeffer's enope squid, is a species of squid from the genus Abraliopsis. The species has been observed in the North Atlantic Ocean.
