= Enoploteuthis obliqua =

Conservation status
- Least Concern (IUCN 3.1)

Scientific classification
- Kingdom: Animalia
- Phylum: Mollusca
- Class: Cephalopoda
- Order: Oegopsida
- Family: Enoploteuthidae
- Genus: Enoploteuthis
- Species: E. obliqua

Binomial name
- Enoploteuthis obliqua (Burgess, 1982)

Species of squid

Enoploteuthis obliqua is a species of squid from the family Enoploteuthidae. The species is rarely documented, but has been observed in the North Pacific Ocean.
