= Abralia trigonura =

Conservation status
- Least Concern (IUCN 3.1)

Scientific classification
- Domain: Eukaryota
- Kingdom: Animalia
- Phylum: Mollusca
- Class: Cephalopoda
- Order: Oegopsida
- Family: Enoploteuthidae
- Genus: Abralia
- Subgenus: Heterabralia
- Species: A. trigonura

Binomial name
- Abralia trigonura Berry, 1913

Species of mollusc

Abralia trigonura is a species of enoploteuthid cephalopod found in the Pacific Ocean in the mesopelagic zone. Females reach a mantle length of 31–35 mm compared to males at 23–27 mm at maturity. Females spawn in batches of 290–430 small eggs, 0.9 mm in length. The paralarvae stage lasts about 40 days before shifting to adult mode. Male spermatophores are relatively small at 7 mm in length. It migrates to the upper water column to feed at night.
