= Pickfordiateuthis vossi =

Conservation status
- Data Deficient (IUCN 3.1)

Scientific classification
- Kingdom: Animalia
- Phylum: Mollusca
- Class: Cephalopoda
- Order: Myopsida
- Family: Loliginidae
- Genus: Pickfordiateuthis
- Species: P. vossi

Binomial name
- Pickfordiateuthis vossi Brakoniecki, 1996

Species of squid

Pickfordiateuthis vossi, commonly known as Voss' grass squid, is a small species of squid in the family Loliginidae. P. Vossi has a mantle length of 15 mm (female) and 13 mm (male) at maturity. It has a long, slender body and large eyes, characteristic of deep-sea squid species. Found in the Eastern Central Pacific Ocean. They are demersal and are found in tropical oceans, mid-water to deep-water environments. This species was originally described in 1996.
