= Enoploteuthis chunii =

Conservation status
- Data Deficient (IUCN 3.1)

Scientific classification
- Kingdom: Animalia
- Phylum: Mollusca
- Class: Cephalopoda
- Order: Oegopsida
- Family: Enoploteuthidae
- Genus: Enoploteuthis
- Species: E. chunii

Binomial name
- Enoploteuthis chunii (Ishikawa, 1914)

Species of squid

Enoploteuthis chunii is a species of squid from the family Enoploteuthidae. They have been observed off the coast of Korea.
