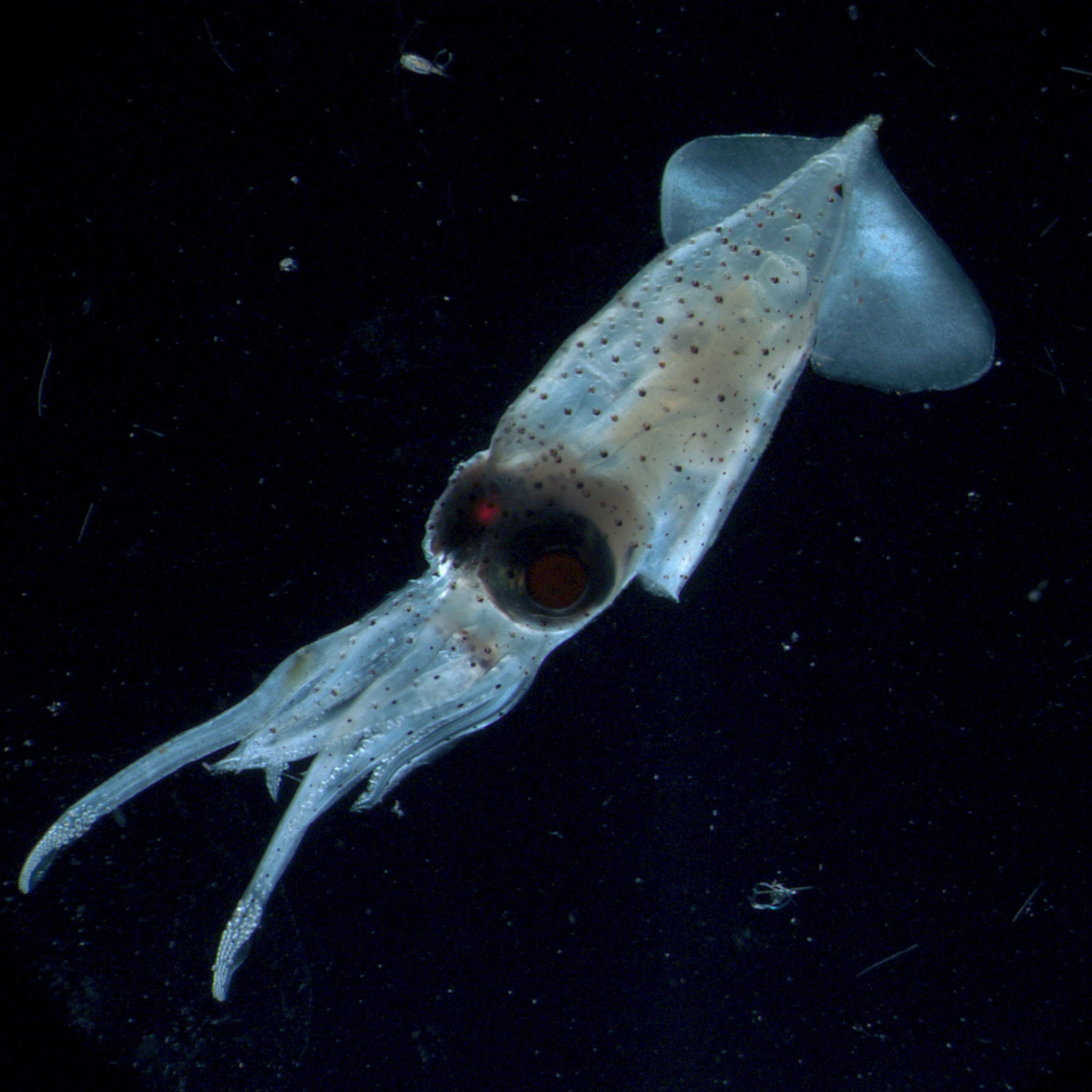
- Enoploteuthis sp.

Scientific classification
- Kingdom: Animalia
- Phylum: Mollusca
- Class: Cephalopoda
- Order: Oegopsida
- Superfamily: Enoploteuthoidea
- Family: Enoploteuthidae; Pfeffer, 1900

Type genus
- Enoploteuthis d'Orbigny, 1844

Genera
- Abralia; Abraliopsis; Enoploteuthis; Watasenia

= Enoploteuthidae =

Family of squids

Enoploteuthidae is a family of squid comprising approximately 40 species in four genera. Most species have a mantle length ranging from 3–13 cm (1.2–5.1 in). Hooks are present on all arms and tentacles. The family is best known for the large array of photophores throughout the body.

== Species ==
- Genus Abralia
  - Abralia andamanica
  - Abralia armata
  - Abralia astrolineata
  - Abralia astrosticta
  - Abralia dubia
  - Abralia fasciolata
  - Abralia grimpei
  - Abralia heminuchalis
  - Abralia marisarabica
  - Abralia multihamata
  - Abralia omiae
  - Abralia redfieldi
  - Abralia renschi
  - Abralia robsoni
  - Abralia siedleckyi
  - Abralia similis
  - Abralia spaercki
  - Abralia steindachneri
  - Abralia trigonura
  - Abralia veranyi, eye-flash squid or Verany's enope squid
- Genus Abraliopsis
  - Abraliopsis affinis
  - Abraliopsis atlantica
  - Abraliopsis chuni
  - Abraliopsis falco
  - Abraliopsis felis
  - Abraliopsis gilchristi
  - Abraliopsis hoylei
  - Abraliopsis lineata
  - ?Abraliopsis morisii *
  - Abraliopsis pacificus
  - Abraliopsis pfefferi, Pfeffer's enope squid
  - Abraliopsis tui
- Genus Enoploteuthis
  - Enoploteuthis anapsis
  - Enoploteuthis chunii
  - Enoploteuthis galaxias
  - Enoploteuthis higginsi
  - Enoploteuthis jonesi
  - Enoploteuthis leptura
  - Enoploteuthis magnoceani
  - Enoploteuthis obliqua
  - Enoploteuthis octolineata
  - Enoploteuthis reticulata
  - Enoploteuthis semilineata
- Genus Watasenia
  - Watasenia scintillans, sparkling enope squid or firefly squid

The species listed above with an asterisk (*) is questionable and needs further study to determine if it is a valid species or a synonym. The question mark (?) indicates questionable placement within the genus.
