= Enoploteuthis reticulata =

Conservation status
- Least Concern (IUCN 3.1)

Scientific classification
- Kingdom: Animalia
- Phylum: Mollusca
- Class: Cephalopoda
- Order: Oegopsida
- Family: Enoploteuthidae
- Genus: Enoploteuthis
- Species: E. reticulata

Binomial name
- Enoploteuthis reticulata (Rancurel, 1970)

Species of squid

Enoploteuthis galaxias is a species of squid from the family Enoploteuthidae. The species has been observed in the North Pacific Ocean.
