= Enoploteuthis anapsis =

Conservation status
- Least Concern (IUCN 3.1)

Scientific classification
- Kingdom: Animalia
- Phylum: Mollusca
- Class: Cephalopoda
- Order: Oegopsida
- Family: Enoploteuthidae
- Genus: Enoploteuthis
- Species: E. anapsis

Binomial name
- Enoploteuthis anapsis (Roper, 1964)

Species of squid

Enoploteuthis anapsis, also known as the starlit enope squid, is a species of squid from the family Enoploteuthidae. The species is gonochoric, and can be found in the Atlantic Ocean.
