= Abralia similis =

Conservation status
- Least Concern (IUCN 3.1)

Scientific classification
- Domain: Eukaryota
- Kingdom: Animalia
- Phylum: Mollusca
- Class: Cephalopoda
- Order: Oegopsida
- Family: Enoploteuthidae
- Genus: Abralia
- Subgenus: Pygmabralia
- Species: A. similis

Binomial name
- Abralia similis Okutani & Tsuchiya, 1987

Species of mollusc

Abralia similis is a species of enoploteuthid cephalopod that occurs in equatorial and subtropical Pacific Ocean waters south of the Kuroshio Current, and is known from the waters of Papua New Guinea, Japan, Kiribati and Tonga. This species exhibits sexual dimorphism, with females reaching mantle lengths of 17–30 mm in length and males only reaching 17–22 mm mantle lengths. Male spermatophores are relatively long, at 5.2–7.7 mm in length. Females have small oocytes, at only 1.0 mm in length.
