= Enoploteuthis jonesi =

Conservation status
- Least Concern (IUCN 3.1)

Scientific classification
- Kingdom: Animalia
- Phylum: Mollusca
- Class: Cephalopoda
- Order: Oegopsida
- Family: Enoploteuthidae
- Genus: Enoploteuthis
- Species: E. jonesi

Binomial name
- Enoploteuthis jonesi (Burgess, 1982)

Species of squid

Enoploteuthis jonesi is a species of squid from the family Enoploteuthidae. The species is gonochoric and can be found in the Pacific Ocean.
