= Abralia spaercki =

Conservation status
- Data Deficient (IUCN 3.1)

Scientific classification
- Domain: Eukaryota
- Kingdom: Animalia
- Phylum: Mollusca
- Class: Cephalopoda
- Order: Oegopsida
- Family: Enoploteuthidae
- Genus: Abralia
- Subgenus: Abralia
- Species: A. spaercki

Binomial name
- Abralia spaercki Grimpe, 1931

Species of mollusc

Abralia spaercki is a species of enoploteuthid cephalopod that has been found in the waters off northern Australia, Indonesia and the Philippines. Its taxonomic relationship with A. multihamata still needs to be determined. It inhabits the mesopelagic zone of continental or island shelves.
