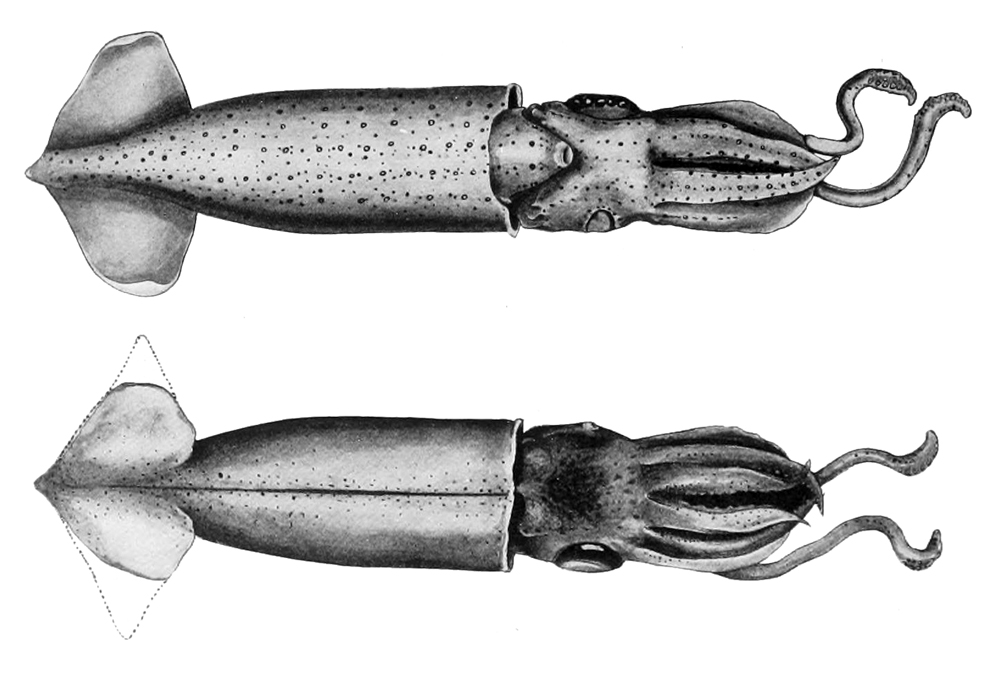

Conservation status
- Least Concern (IUCN 3.1)

Scientific classification
- Domain: Eukaryota
- Kingdom: Animalia
- Phylum: Mollusca
- Class: Cephalopoda
- Order: Oegopsida
- Family: Enoploteuthidae
- Genus: Abralia
- Subgenus: Astrabralia
- Species: A. astrosticta

Binomial name
- Abralia astrosticta Berry, 1909

= Abralia astrosticta =

Species of mollusc

Abralia astrosticta is a species of enoploteuthid cephalopod present in the waters of Australia, French Polynesia, Japan, New Zealand, the Philippines and Hawaiʻi. They have large ventral photophores. Females carry oocytes 1.0 mm in length in their ovaries.
