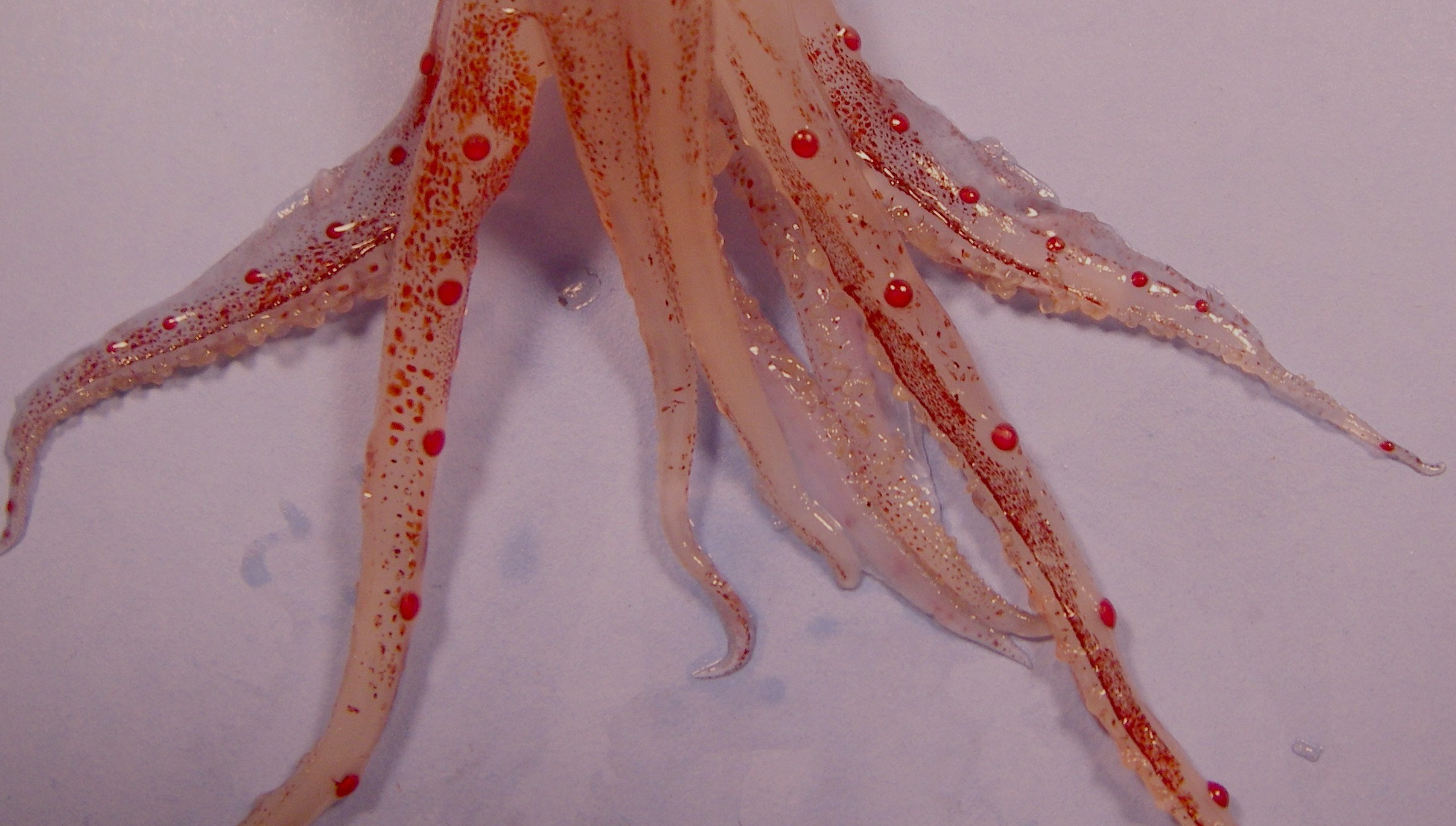
- Tentacles of Abralia veranyi

Conservation status
- Least Concern (IUCN 3.1)

Scientific classification
- Kingdom: Animalia
- Phylum: Mollusca
- Class: Cephalopoda
- Order: Oegopsida
- Family: Enoploteuthidae
- Genus: Abralia
- Subgenus: Asteroteuthis
- Species: A. veranyi

Binomial name
- Abralia veranyi (Rüppell, 1844)

Synonyms
- Enoploteuthis veranyi Rüppell, 1844

= Abralia veranyi =

Species of squid

Abralia veranyi is a species of squid in the family Enoploteuthidae. Common names include the eye-flash squid, Verany's enope squid and the midwater squid. It is found in the Atlantic Ocean and the Mediterranean Sea. It undergoes a daily vertical migration from deep waters to near the surface.

== Description ==
Abralia veranyi is a small species with a mantle length of about 4 centimetres (1.6 in). It has a fin, four pairs of arms and two long tentacles. The tips of the arms bear four rows of suckers and there are three hooks on the club of each tentacle. The male has the fourth arm on the left modified into a hectocotylus. This is used to store spermatophores and transfer them into the mantle of the female during mating. The underside of the squid bears about 550 light-producing organs called photophores. These are arranged in transverse rows each consisting of 4 to 6 large ones with many small ones in between. There are two large and three medium-sized photophores below each of the large eyes.

== Distribution ==
This species was first described from the Mediterranean Sea but is also found across much of the tropical and subtropical Atlantic Ocean. The range extends from France and the West African coast to the Bear Seamount off New England, the Bahamas, the Gulf of Mexico, the Sargasso Sea and northern Brazil. It has been found at depths of 700 to 800 metres (2,300 to 2,600 ft) in the daytime but only 20 to 60 metres (66 to 197 ft) at night.

In 1921, a resident of Funchal, Madeira, Senor de Noronha, gave an account of what is believed to be the first recording of the species from the Atlantic Ocean:

The cephalopod in question has been captured by myself in the sheltered quay of this city of Funchal, called the Quay of Pontinha, during the months of July, August, and September. Almost every year one may capture them in this harbor during the night where they approach the steps of debarcation, following the lighting of the electric lamps of the above mentioned steps. With a certain alacrity one may catch them with the aid of a little wire basket, because these animals come almost to the surface of the water, being distinguishable by the brilliancy of a bluish phosphorescence which they cause to gleam from their eyes.

== Biology ==
Abralia veranyi remains at great depths where no light penetrates during the day, in order to avoid predators. However, it must rise to near the surface at night to feed on the small invertebrates that constitute its prey.

=== Counter-illumination camouflage ===
Abralia veranyi has photophores on its underside. It is thought that their purpose is to make the squid less visible as a dark silhouette when viewed from below in dim light. The bioluminescence produced provides counter-illumination, a form of camouflage, which helps to break up the squid's outline. The squid monitors the temperature of the water as a guide to regulating the emission spectra of the light it needs to emit to closely mimic the scintillating surface of the sea. In cold seas it mimics the blueish colour that sunlight produces at these depths and in warmer water, greener, moonlight colours are produced.
