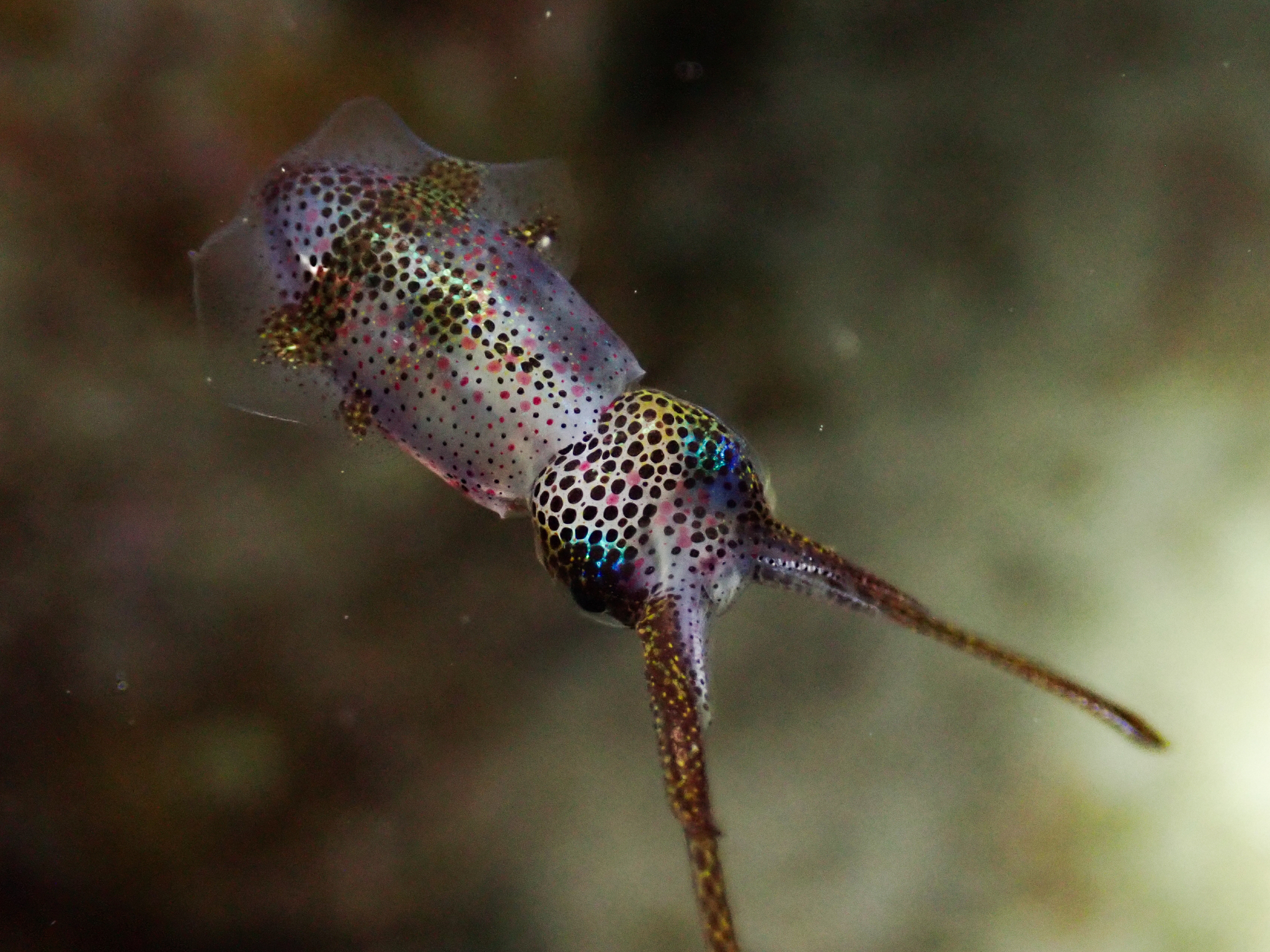
- An image of P. pulchella taken by João D'Andretta

Conservation status
- Data Deficient (IUCN 3.1)

Scientific classification
- Kingdom: Animalia
- Phylum: Mollusca
- Class: Cephalopoda
- Order: Myopsida
- Family: Loliginidae
- Genus: Pickfordiateuthis
- Species: P. pulchella

Binomial name
- Pickfordiateuthis pulchella Voss, 1953

= Pickfordiateuthis pulchella =

Grass squid

Species of squid

Pickfordiateuthis pulchella, the grass squid, is a species of squid in the family Loliginidae. There was a single specimen of Pickfordiateuthis pulchella found when testing 246 specimens available in the area of Cabo de São Tomé (22°S) and Cananéia (25°S) at depths down to 200 m (660 ft) from 1991 to 2005. The amount of this species peaked in different areas and were associated with distinct oceanographic conditions. Migratory species. They are often found in sea grass. Nesting grounds are usually crevices in rocky coral or reef points near to beaches (Summer and Spring). These are small (22 mm ML max.), muscular squids that occupy neritic waters often in association with small patch reefs and seagrass (Voss, 1953). In spite of the accessible habitat, the squid is rarely captured and little is known of its biology.

== Mating ==
Lay 40–190 eggs per occasion, with a reproductive system of 2–3 years. Male and female adults usually die shortly after spawning and brooding.
