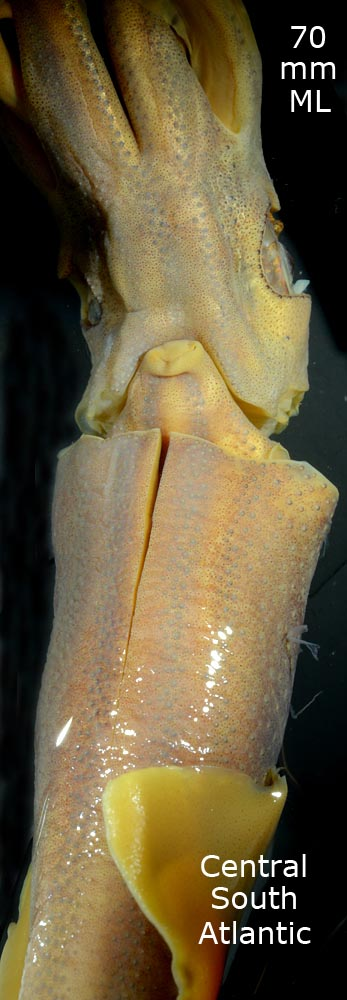

Conservation status
- Data Deficient (IUCN 3.1)

Scientific classification
- Kingdom: Animalia
- Phylum: Mollusca
- Class: Cephalopoda
- Order: Oegopsida
- Family: Enoploteuthidae
- Genus: Enoploteuthis
- Species: E. semilineata

Binomial name
- Enoploteuthis semilineata Alexeyev, 1994

Synonyms
- Enoploteuthis (Paraenoploteuthis) semilineata Alexeyev, 1994

= Enoploteuthis semilineata =

Species of squid

Enoploteuthis semilineata is a species of squid within the family Enoploteuthidae known to inhabit the central South Pacific in deep-water environments. It is currently listed as 'Data deficient' by the IUCN Red List in 2010 due to little information on the species.
