= Abralia astrolineata =

Conservation status
- Data Deficient (IUCN 3.1)

Scientific classification
- Kingdom: Animalia
- Phylum: Mollusca
- Class: Cephalopoda
- Order: Oegopsida
- Family: Enoploteuthidae
- Genus: Abralia
- Subgenus: Astrabralia
- Species: A. astrolineata

Binomial name
- Abralia astrolineata Berry, 1914
- Holotype site (USNM 816428): Kermadec Islands, Sunday Island, on beach

Species of mollusc

Abralia astrolineata is a species of enoploteuthid cephalopod that occurs in the waters around the Kermadec Islands in New Zealand. It is fairly large for this genus, growing up to 100 mm in mantle length.

It was first described in 1914 by Samuel Stillman Berry.
