= Abralia heminuchalis =

Conservation status
- Data Deficient (IUCN 3.1)

Scientific classification
- Domain: Eukaryota
- Kingdom: Animalia
- Phylum: Mollusca
- Class: Cephalopoda
- Order: Oegopsida
- Family: Enoploteuthidae
- Genus: Abralia
- Subgenus: Heterabralia
- Species: A. heminuchalis

Binomial name
- Abralia heminuchalis Burgess, 1992

Species of mollusc

Abralia heminuchalis is a species of enoploteuthid cephalopod native to the equatorial regions of the Pacific Ocean. It may be a junior synonym of A. siedleckyi. Females are larger (28–37 mm mantle length) than males (25–32 mm mantle length). Oocytes in mature females can reach 1.25 mm in length. Male spermatophores are relatively small at 3.6–4.0 mm in length.
