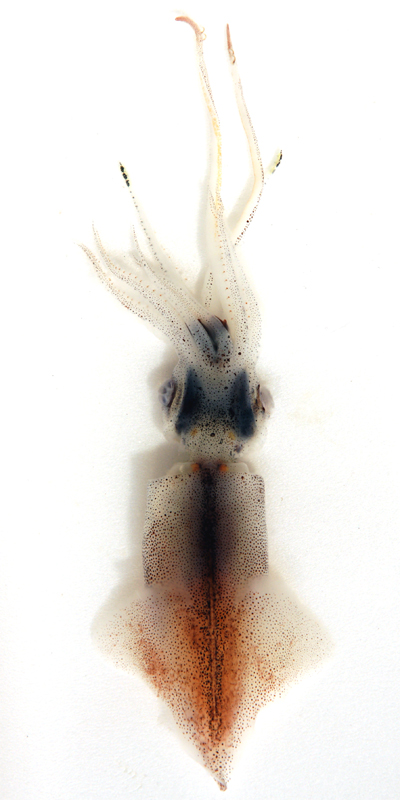

Conservation status
- Least Concern (IUCN 3.1)

Scientific classification
- Kingdom: Animalia
- Phylum: Mollusca
- Class: Cephalopoda
- Order: Oegopsida
- Family: Enoploteuthidae
- Genus: Watasenia; Ishikawa, 1914
- Species: W. scintillans

Binomial name
- Watasenia scintillans (Berry, 1911)

Synonyms
- Abralia (Compsoteuthis) nishikawae Pfeffer, 1912; Abralia japonica Ishikawa, 1929; Abraliopsis scintillans Berry, 1911

= Firefly squid =

Species of cephalopod also known as the sparkling enope squid

The firefly squid (Watasenia scintillans), also commonly known as the sparkling enope squid or hotaru-ika in Japan, is a species of squid in the family Enoploteuthidae. W. scintillans is the sole species in the monotypic genus Watasenia.

These tiny squid are found on the shores of Japan in springtime during spawning season, but spend most of their lives in deeper waters between 200 and 400 metres (700 and 1,300 feet; 100 and 200 fathoms). They are bioluminescent organisms and emit blue light from photophores, which some scientists have hypothesized could be used for communication, camouflage, or attracting food, but it is still unclear in the scientific community exactly how this species uses their bioluminescence.

The firefly squid is a predator and actively hunts its food, which includes copepods, small fish, and other squids. The lifespan of a firefly squid is about one year. At the end of their lives, females return close to shore to release their eggs and then die shortly thereafter. This mass migration of firefly squid to the shore is a lucrative business for Japanese fishermen, and during spawning season many go out to the bays to collect the dying squid. Many more also visit Japan during spawning season to see the bright blue light created from the firefly squid's bioluminescence light up the bay, making their spawning season not only a fishing opportunity but also a tourist attraction.

== Anatomy and morphology ==
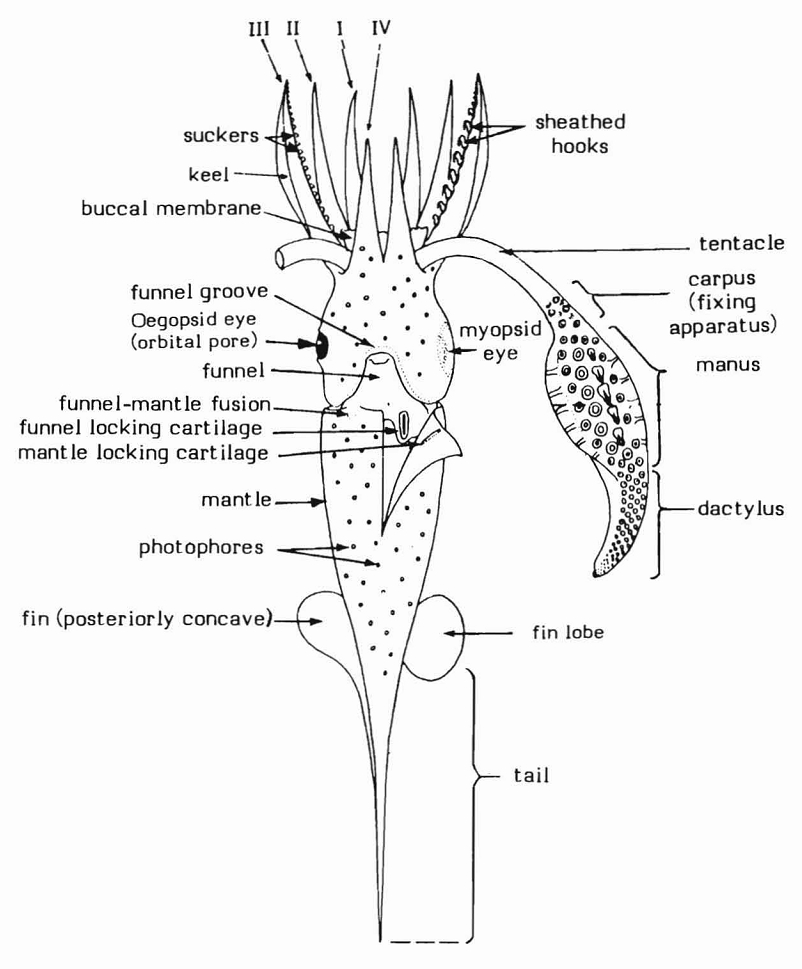
Diagram illustrating the basic features of a generic squid. The mantle, eyes, arms, tentacles, buccal membrane, and typical suckers are all shown in this diagram.

The firefly squid belongs to the Cephalopoda class and the superorder Decapodiformes, commonly known as squid. Their body consists of a distinct head and mantle, and has a bilaterally symmetrical layout. They are soft-bodied organisms with a skeletal structure composed of chitin. They have relatively large eyes, eight arms, and two tentacles. They are further classified into the order Oegopsida for possessing the characteristic traits of having no tentacle pockets in the head and no suckers on the buccal supports. They belong to the family of Enoploteuthidae, based on the hooks on their tentacles.

On average, an adult firefly squid is approximately 7.5 cm (3 in) in length. They are brown/red in color, but emit blue and green light by their photophores. Firefly squid possess three types of photophores. There are multiple (800–1000) small photophores covering the ventral surface of its body, five larger photophores around the lower margins of each eye, and three very large photophores at the tip of each of the fourth pair of arms. The photophores that dot the body of the squid produce two different wavelengths of light (both blue and green bioluminescence) while those around the eye and on the arms only produce blue light. The reactant luciferin and the necessary enzyme luciferase are located in a crystalline structure within rod-like bodies in their photophores. Firefly squid are the only cephalopods to have this structural arrangement which increases the efficiency of its bioluminescence and allows the light to be directed downward in a cone-like projection. This directed cone of bioluminescence is hypothesized to allow the Firefly squid to better detect its prey and predators from below and attract small fish to eat. The photophores on the tips of its fourth arm pair produce a very intense light that can be seen by the naked eye.

== Distribution ==
The firefly squid inhabits the waters off the coast of Japan. The depth at which these squids can be found varies (300–400 m or 1,000–1,300 ft during the day, and 20–60 m or 70–200 ft during the night) over the course of a day, as they are one of the several species of squid that participates in diel vertical migration. For this reason, they also experience a significant change in environmental temperatures throughout the course of a day(3–6 °C or 37–43 °F during the day and 5–15 °C or 41–59 °F during the night). The firefly squid is especially well known for its yearly migration to the coastal waters of Toyama Bay for the purpose of reproduction.

== Diet and predators ==
The diet of a firefly squid changes throughout its life stages. During its paralarval stage, its diet is primarily composed of calanoid copepods (zooplankton). Subadult and adult stages see an increase in dietary diversity to include planktonic crustaceans, fishes, and squid.

Firefly squid face high predation rates and may serve as the primary food source for some predatory species including northern fur seals, particularly during their yearly migration. The squid spends the day at depths of several hundred meters, returning to the surface when night falls. It uses its abilities to sense and produce light for counter-illumination camouflage: it matches the brightness and colour of its underside to the light coming from the surface, making it difficult for predators to detect it from below. As a participant in diel vertical migration, firefly squid primarily feed during the night. This feeding strategy is reflected in the squid's gut anatomy, which has a longer cecum that allows it to absorb nutrients during the day when its metabolic rate is lower.

== Bioluminescence and vision ==
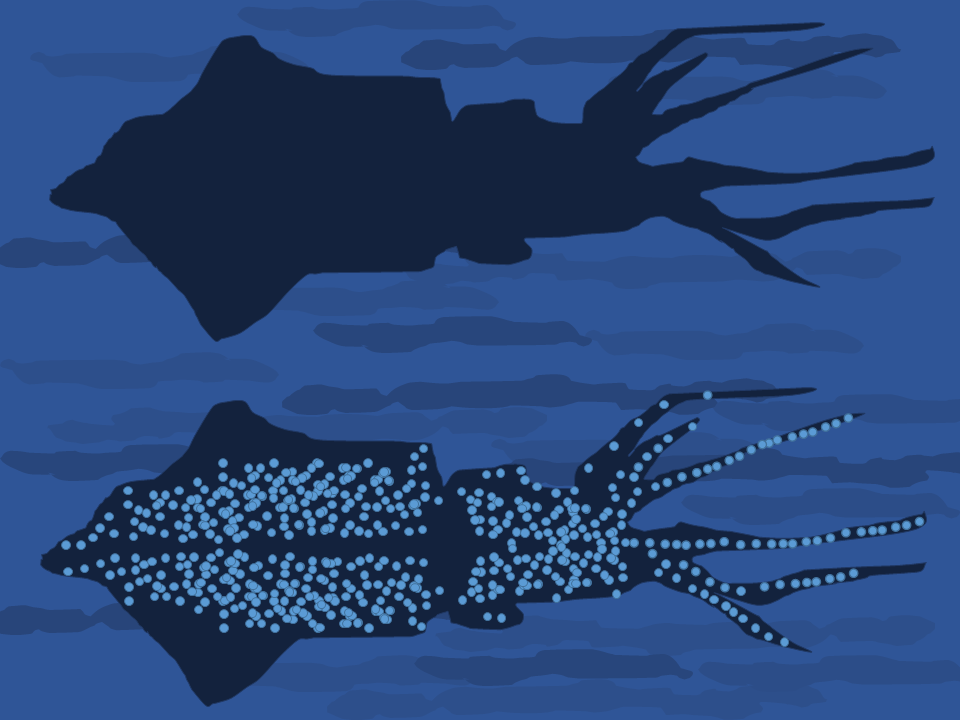
Principle of the squid's counter-illumination camouflage. When seen from below by a predator, the bioluminescence helps to match the squid's brightness and colour to the sea surface above.

=== Background ===
The firefly squid resides in the deep waters of the Western Pacific Ocean where limited amounts of visual light penetrate from the surface and are bioluminescent. The shorter wavelengths of visible light are blue, green, and yellow. These shorter wavelengths have more energy and can penetrate deeper into the water column. The squid's visual system is adapted to capture the greatest amount of light at these depths. Each eye has a large pupil to allow more ambient light to enter the eye, no cornea to reduce or distort absorbed light, a spherical lens to greatly limit distortion (coma and astigmatism), and a predominant visual pigment, retinal (A1) with a maximal absorption at 482 nm.

=== Research ===
Chemical and structural analysis of the firefly squid retina reveal the presence of three visually active pigments located in distinct regions of the squid's retina. This is unique among cephalopods and may allow these squid to have color discrimination vision. The presence of two or more visually active pigments have only been found in the eyes of other organisms capable of color discrimination. The three pigments found include retinal (A1) with maximal absorption at 482 nm, hydroxyretinal (A4) with maximal absorption at 470 nm, and dehydroretinal (A2) with maximal absorption at 500 nm. Scanning electron microscopy shows that each pigment is contained in individual retinal photoreceptor cells which allows segregation of each pigment to specific locations on the squid retina. Light of specific wavelengths need to reach the specific photoreceptive cells in the retina to avoid longitudinal spherical aberration (LSA). Cone cells of the vertebrate retina are clustered in the same retinal location and use multifocal lenses to refract the wavelengths to activate the specific photoreceptor cells. Firefly squid do not have multifocal lenses, but use a banked retina –specific photoreceptive cells are located at different distances from the lens – to compensate for LSA.

== Mating ==
=== Background ===
Cephalopods species have historically been polyandrous, in which a female mates with multiple mates, through common reproductive traits and life history. Firefly squid show rare evidence of cephalopod monogamy in their reproductive cycle when they make a yearly migration to the coastal waters of Toyama Bay each spring during their mating season. For example, females store sperm for long periods in bilateral pouches under the neck collar, and are capable of egg spawning after the breeding season when males are no longer present. Males show specific sperm production and release patterning to augment their reproductive success. One proposed explanation for this unusual behavior is that although the males reach sexual maturity prior to the breeding season, females do not reach full maturity until later in the season. As a result of the shorter life-span of males, most males are only able to copulate once and are largely gone by the time that females are able to use the sperm stored during copulation. Once the squid's eggs have been fertilized and laid, it dies, having reached the end of its one-year lifespan. Spawning, which involves large aggregations of the squid, takes place between February and July.

=== Research ===
Research was conducted in 2020 around the Oki Islands in the Sea of Japan, a prevalent mating ground for W. scintillans, during the estimated mating period (EMP) of mid-February to mid-March to test the firefly squid monogamy hypothesis. Researchers found that mated females stored an equivalent amount of sperm in both pouches surrounding their seminal receptacles. They also observed a gradual decrease in the quantity of sperm during the reproductive season. This data indicates the preservation of sperm through the lifespan of the female firefly squid. Researchers found that 95% of females tested stored sperm from a single male. Further data collection confirmed that a single male's sperm fertilized all of the female's eggs. Both of these findings support monogamous reproduction of W. scintillans. To test monogamy in male firefly squids, researchers measured the maturity and fecundity of individuals. Data show that average male sperm levels would allow for no more than 2–3 copulations. The evidence for a low sperm production capacity and limited mating opportunities for males based on biased operational sex ratio and a lack of female remating supports the monogamy hypothesis in males. Female monandry was established first and subsequently males followed suit to create mutual monogamy in W. scintillans.

== Commercial use ==
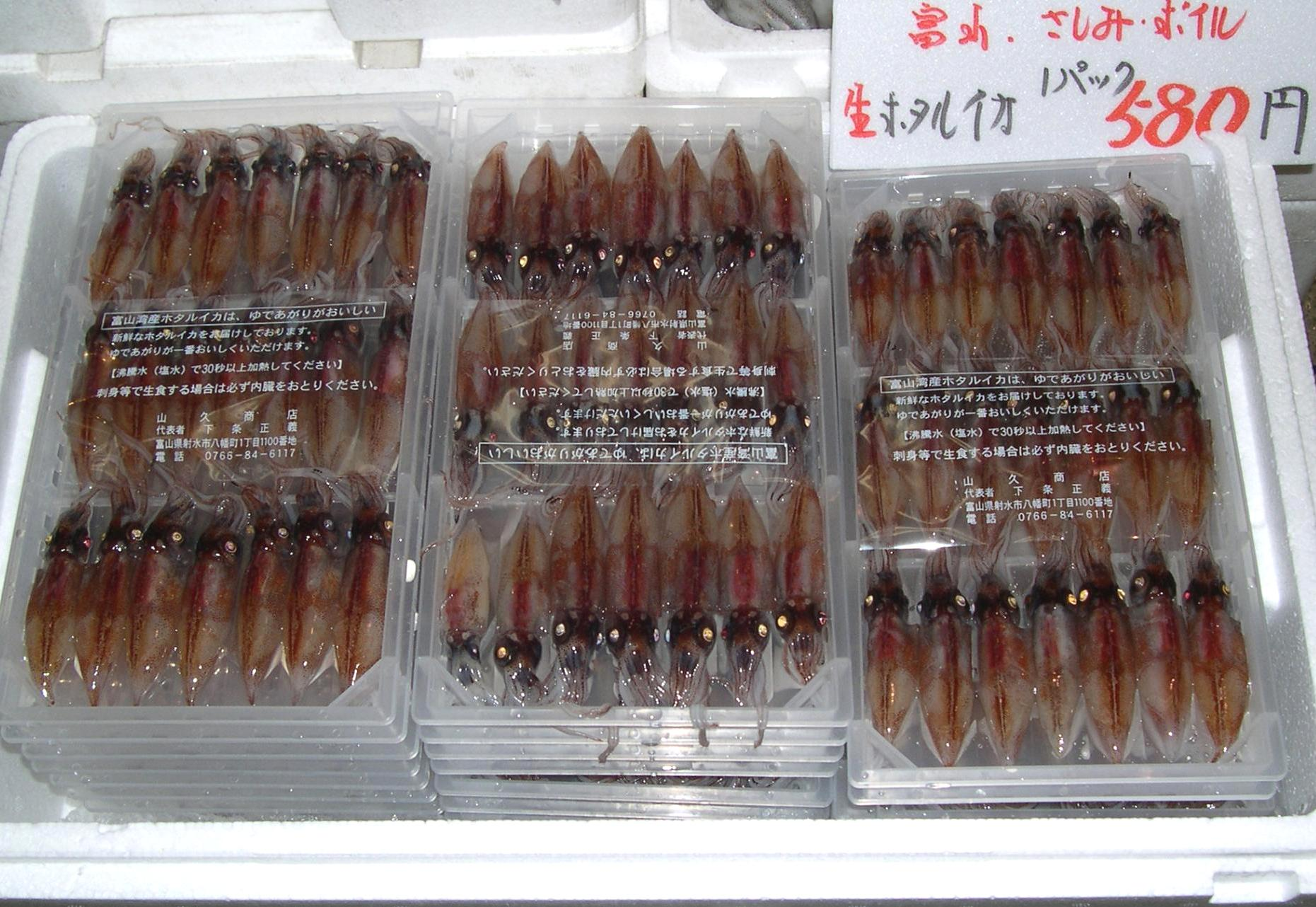
Firefly squid sold in Tokyo. They are caught in bulk during spawning on the shores of Japan and are offered in many restaurants and grocery stores

Fishers have long known that firefly squid congregate in Toyama Bay off the Japanese coast to spawn. They are often caught at night when they rise to the surface or in fishing nets that trawl mesopelagic depths during the day. Commercial consumption of the W. scintillans is largely driven by the flashing blue display of photophores that makes them considered a menu prized item at restaurants. This squid is commercially fished in Japan, accounting for an annual catch of 4,804 to 6,822 tons from 1990 to 1999.

Storage of W. scintillans has been difficult due to their adaptation to a deep sea environment that is notably cold and dark. Researchers found that long-term sedation (3+ days) of firefly squid can be accomplished using magnesium sulphate with relatively no harm being conferred to the organisms. W. scintillans quickly returned to its normal state only minutes after being transferred into fresh seawater at the final destination. The transported animals maintained their photophore-flashing capabilities, a key focus for researchers.

=== As food ===
Historically, firefly squid was never eaten raw in Japan, due to risk of the nematode parasite Crassicauda giliakiana. However, with the use of modern refrigeration, raw firefly squid can now be served after passing food safety standards set by the Ministry of Health, Labour and Welfare.

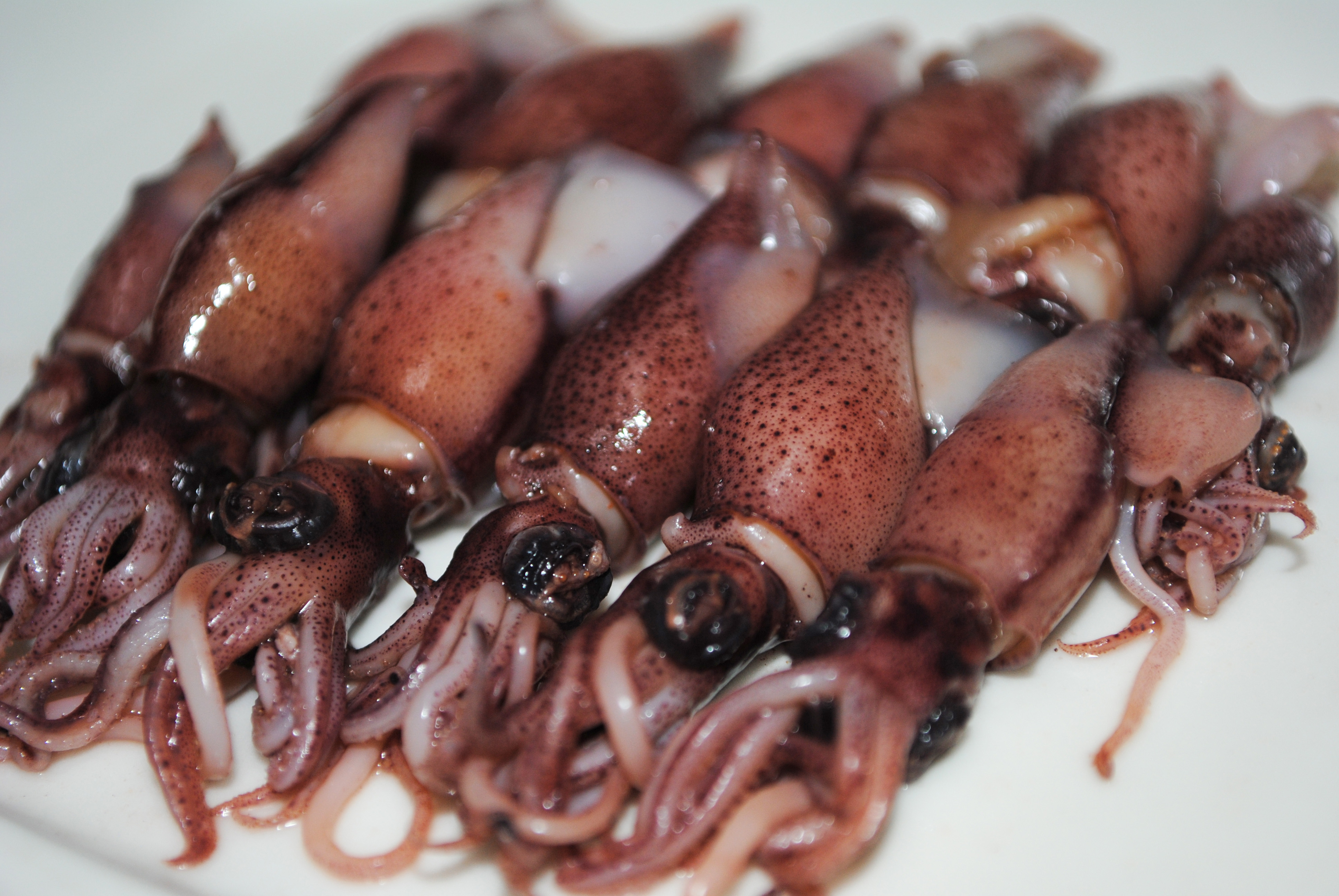
Boiled firefly squid

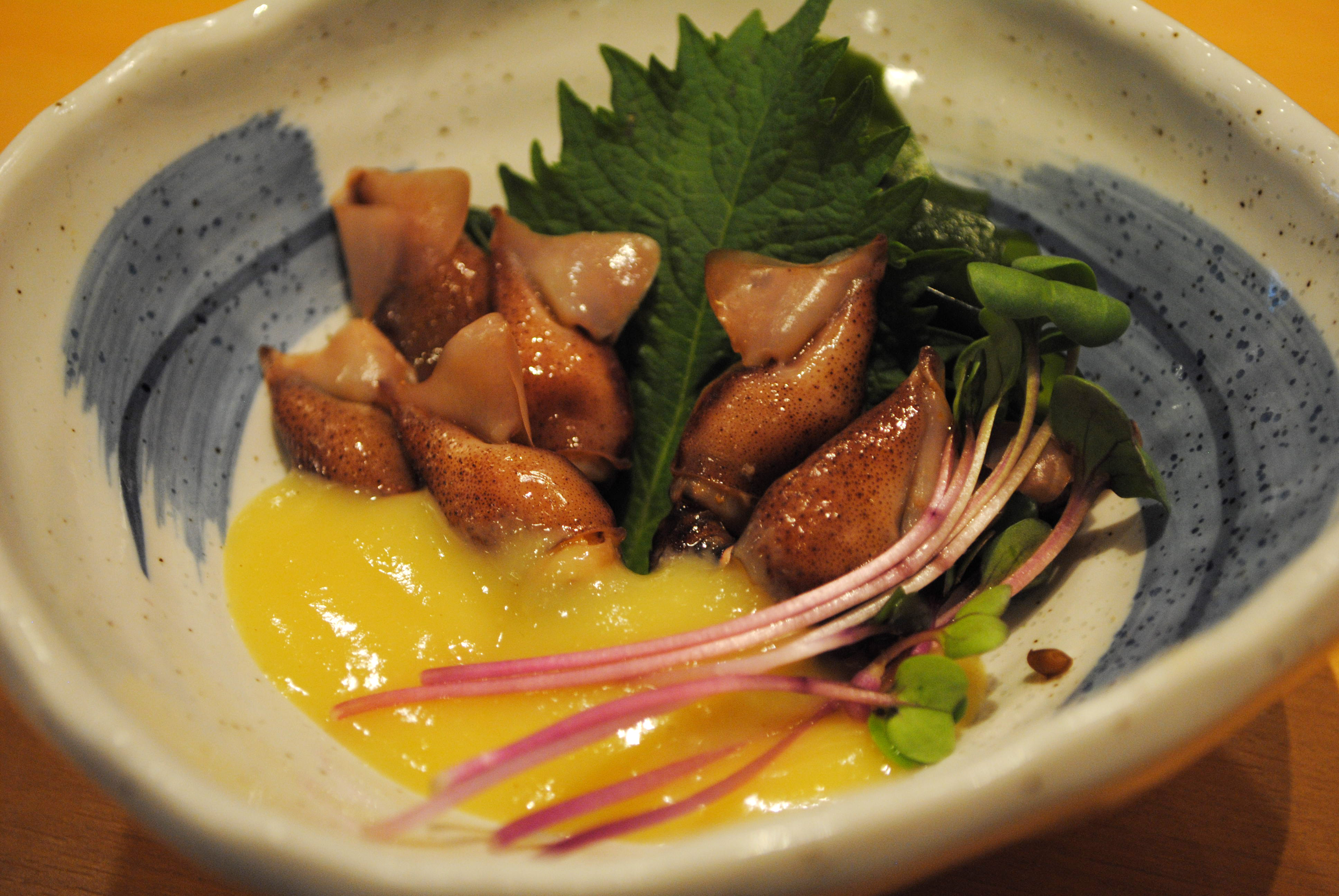
Boiled and served with vinegared miso

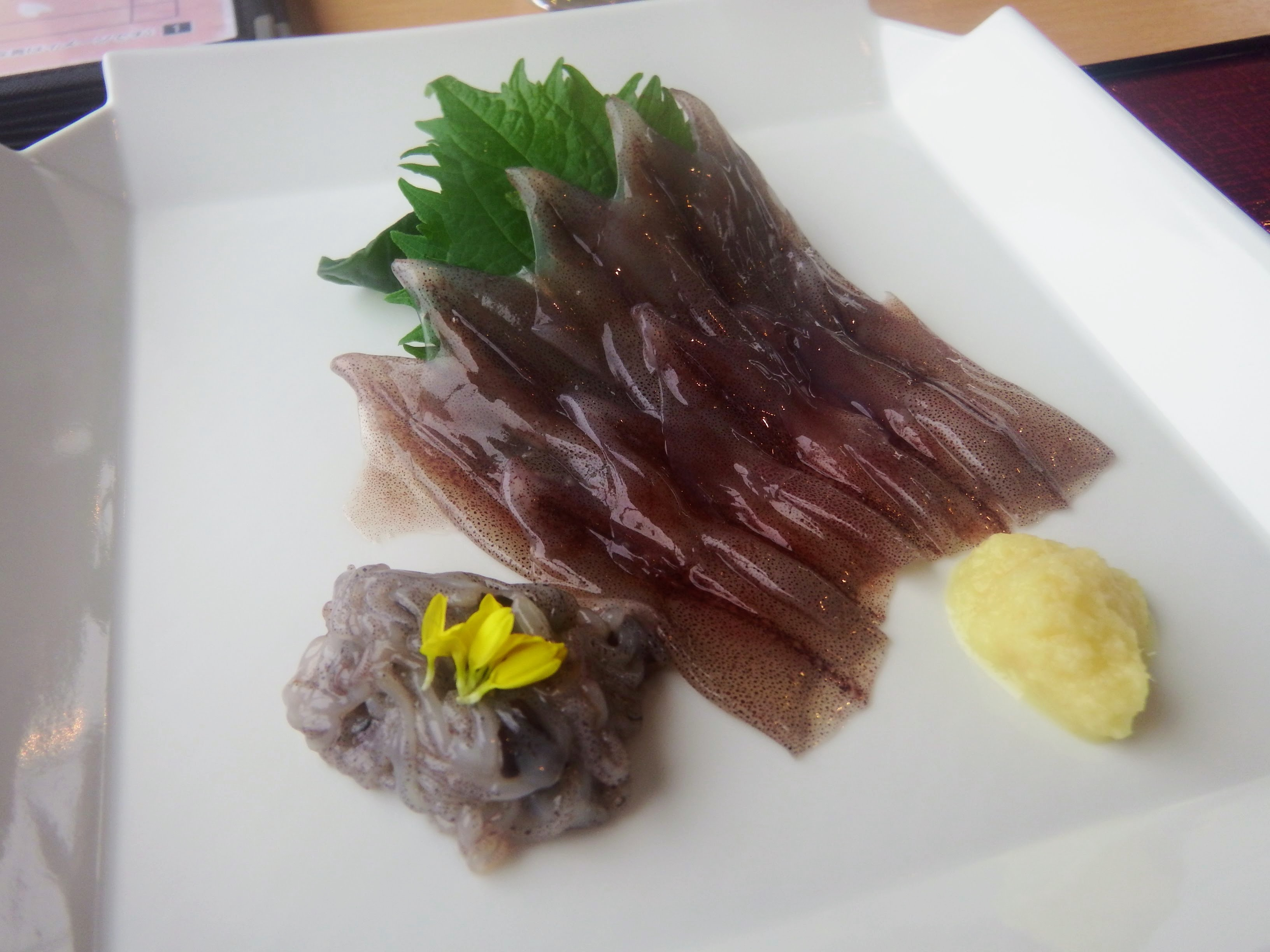
As sashimi

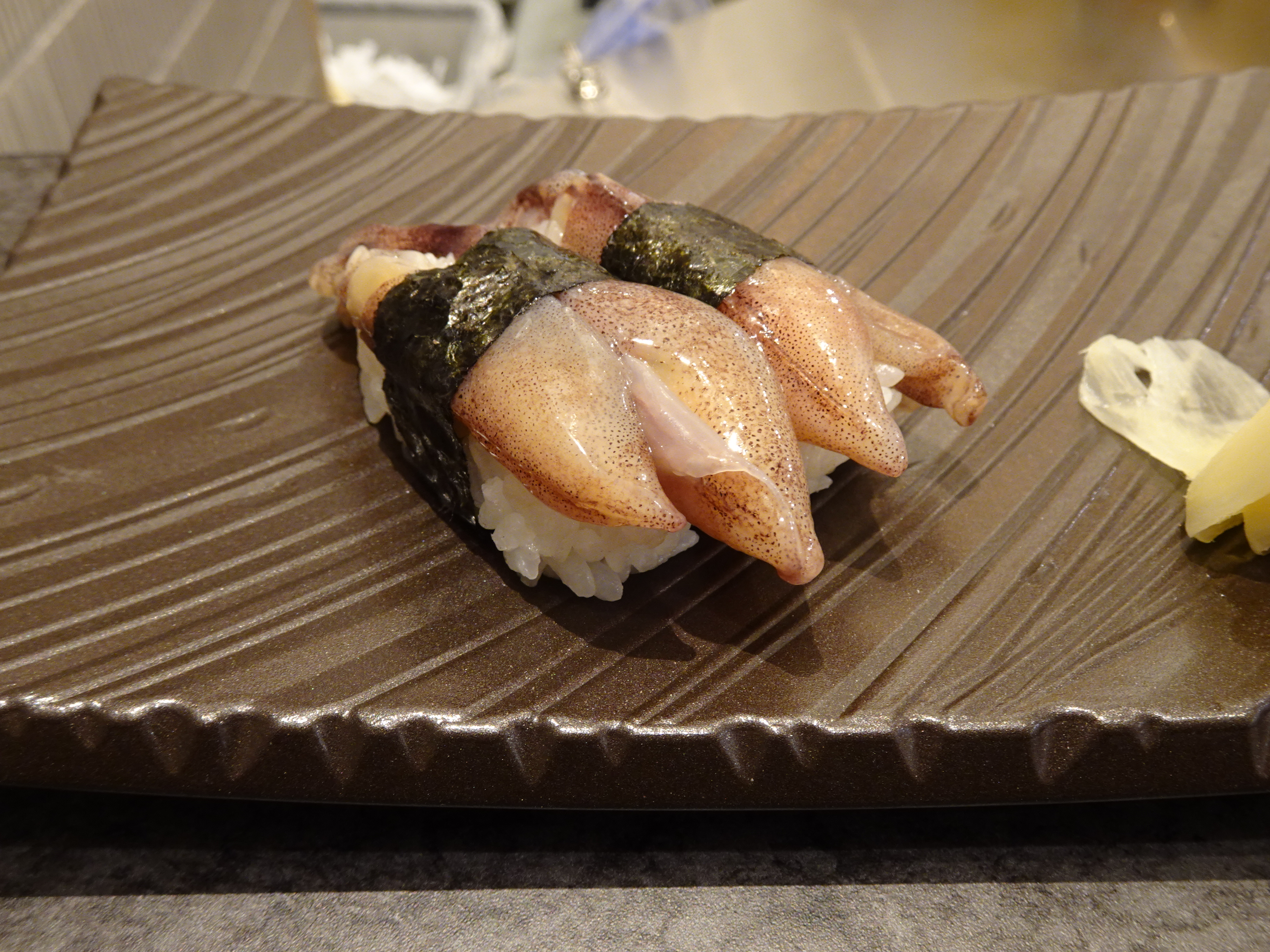
As sushi

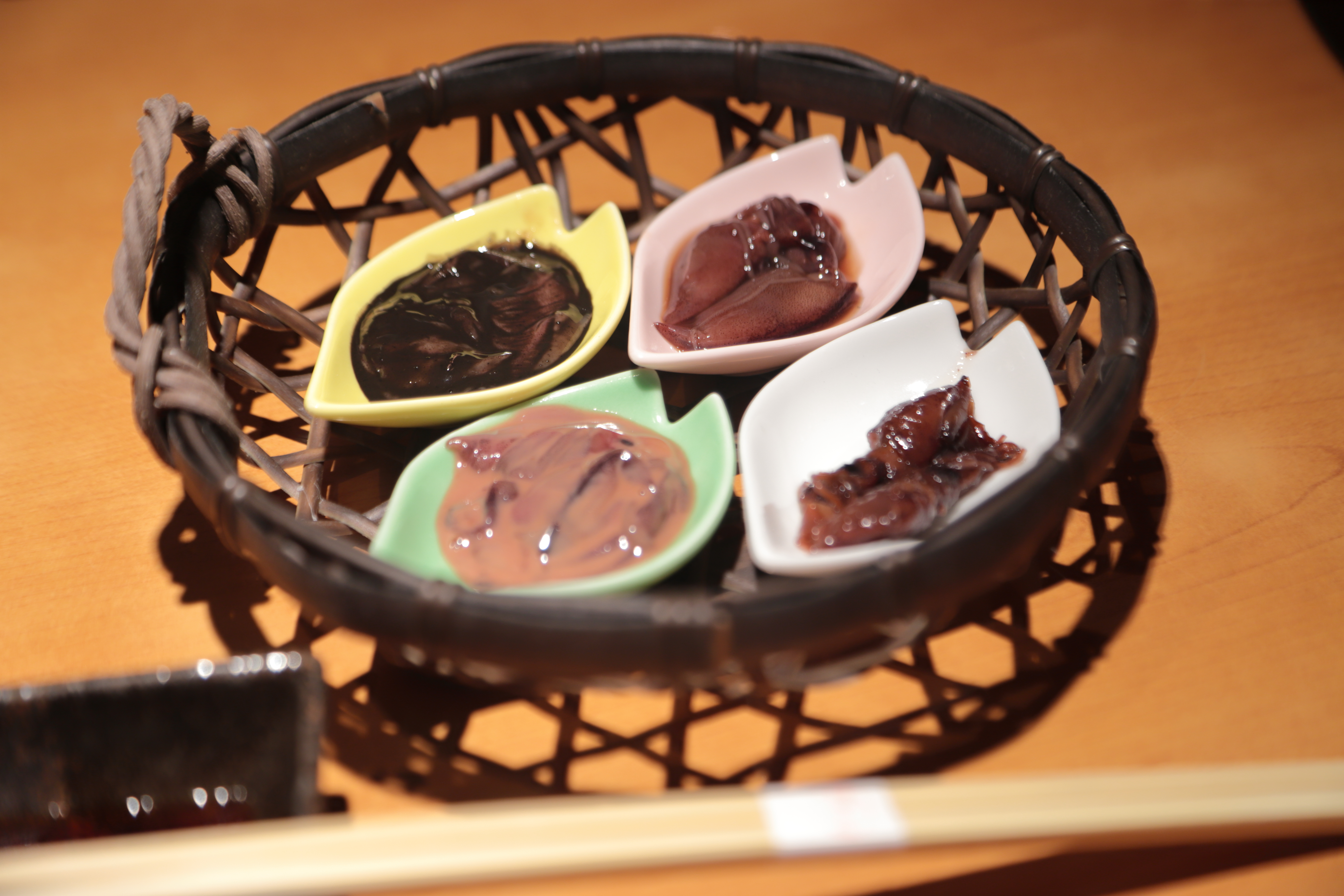
Mixed with squid ink and shiokara

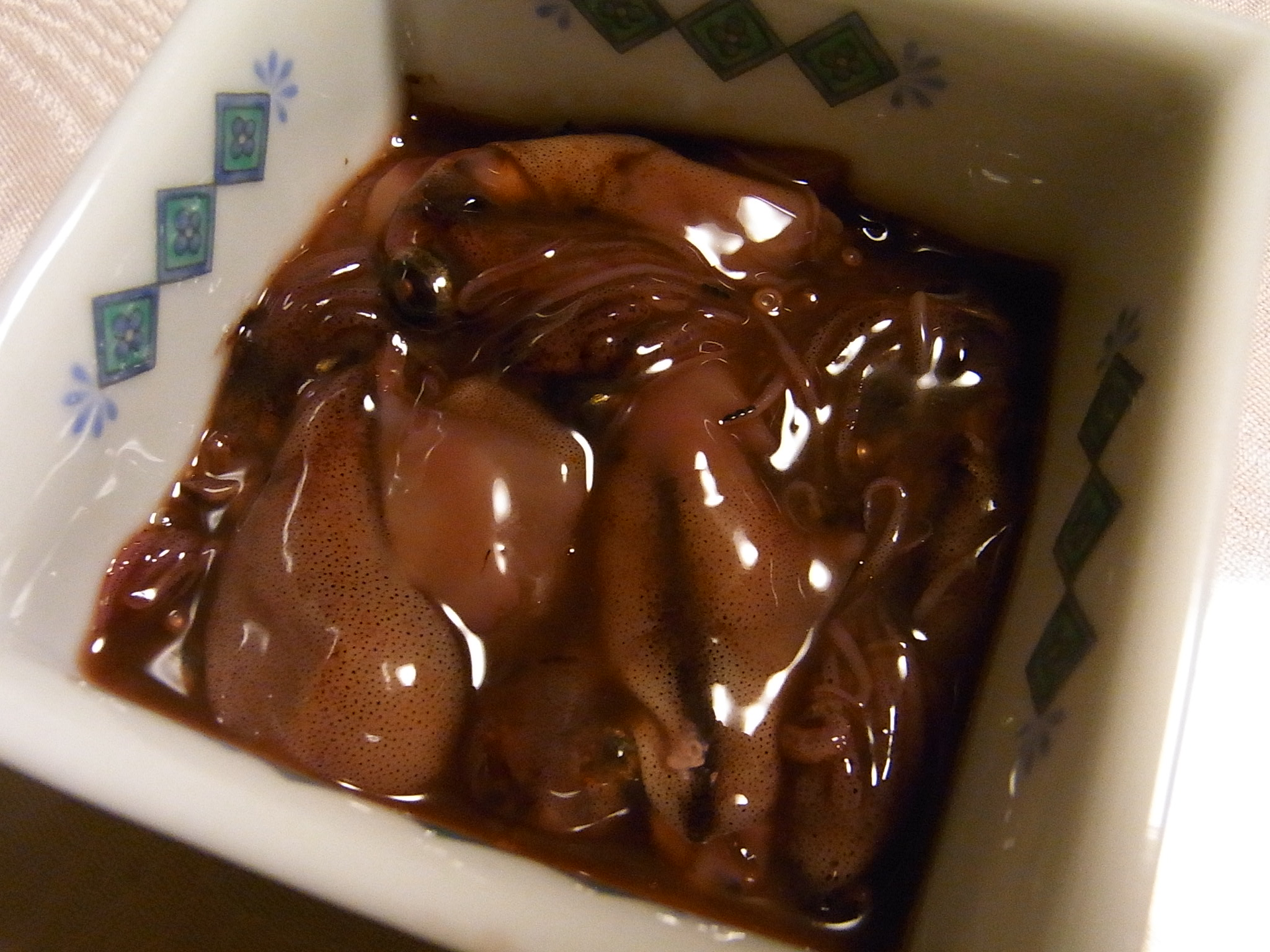
Served in soy sauce

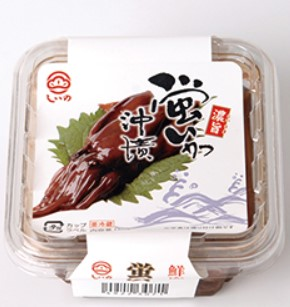
Marinated in okizuke (soy sauce, vinegar, sake)

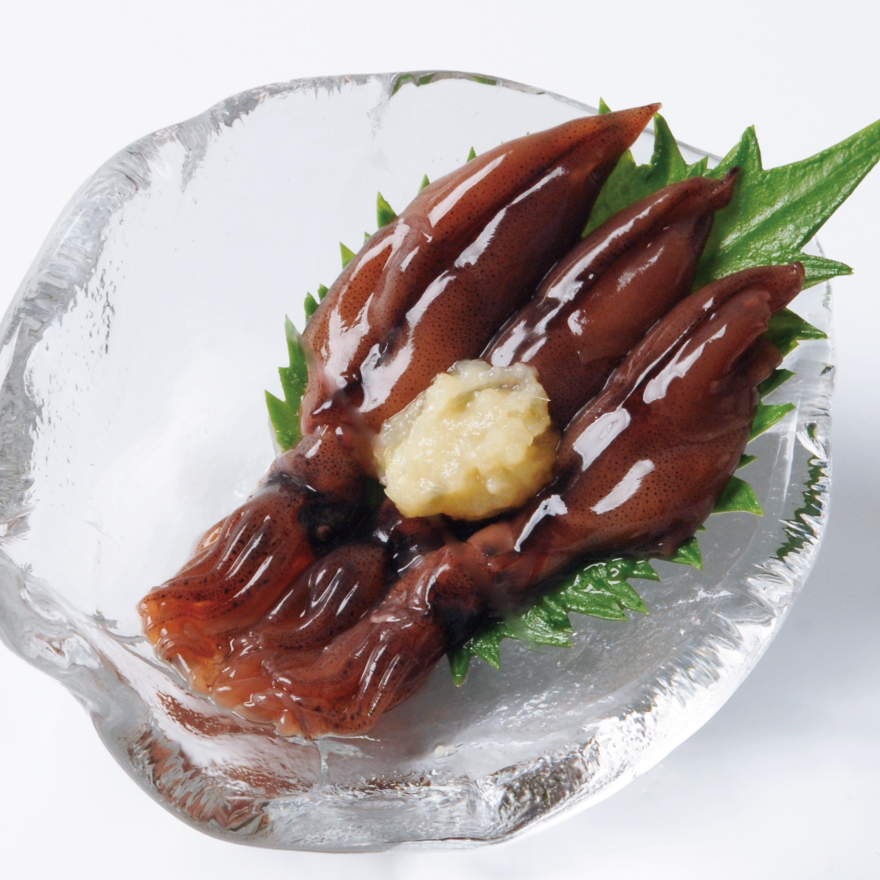
With grated daikon radish

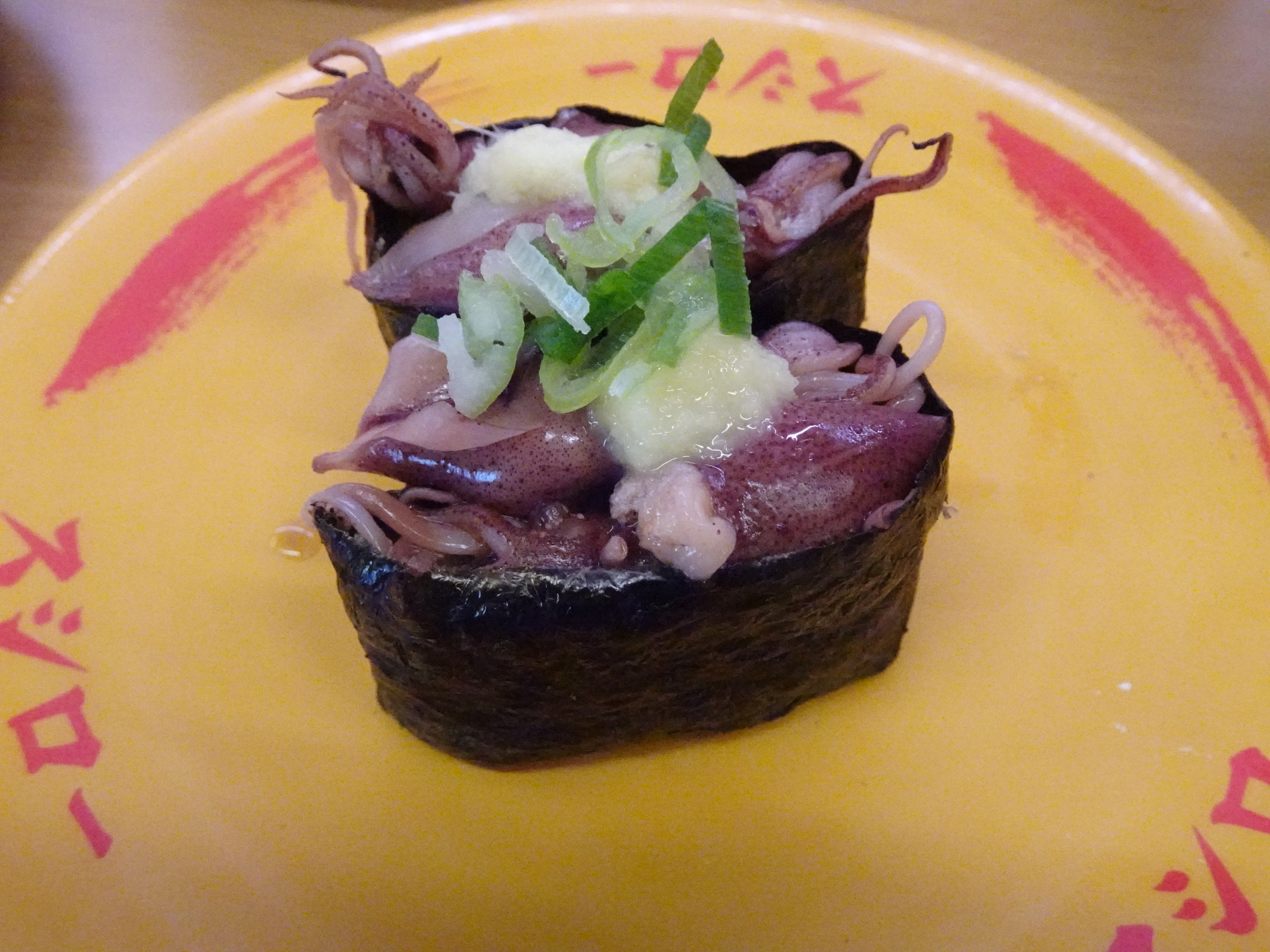
As gunkanmaki

== See also ==
- List of Special Places of Scenic Beauty, Special Historic Sites and Special Natural Monuments

== Sources ==
- Patel, K. and D. Pee 2011. "Watasenia scintillans" (On-line), Animal Diversity Web. Accessed October 9, 2016 at http://animaldiversity.org/accounts/Watasenia_scintillans/
