= Abralia steindachneri =

Conservation status
- Least Concern (IUCN 3.1)

Scientific classification
- Kingdom: Animalia
- Phylum: Mollusca
- Class: Cephalopoda
- Order: Oegopsida
- Family: Enoploteuthidae
- Genus: Abralia
- Subgenus: Abralia
- Species: A. steindachneri

Binomial name
- Abralia steindachneri Weindl, 1912

Species of mollusc

Abralia steindachneri is a species of enoploteuthid cephalopod found in Indo-Pacific waters, from east Africa to the Ryukyu Islands of Japan and northern Australia.
