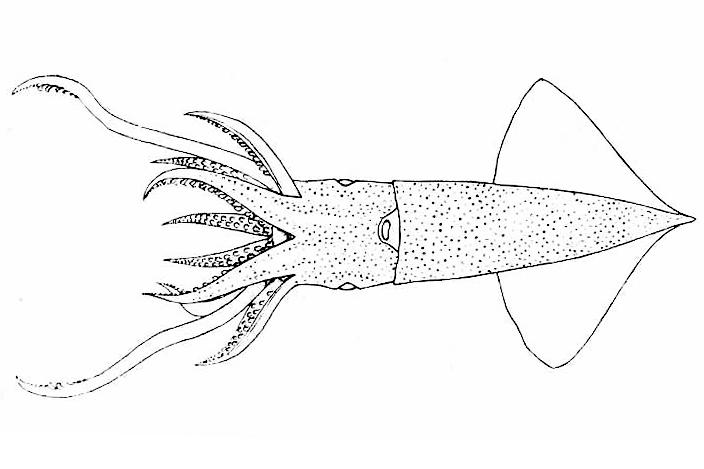

Conservation status
- Least Concern (IUCN 3.1)

Scientific classification
- Domain: Eukaryota
- Kingdom: Animalia
- Phylum: Mollusca
- Class: Cephalopoda
- Order: Oegopsida
- Family: Enoploteuthidae
- Genus: Abralia
- Subgenus: Heterabralia
- Species: A. andamanica

Binomial name
- Abralia andamanica Goodrich, 1896

= Abralia andamanica =

Species of mollusc

Abralia andamanica is a species of enoploteuthid cephalopod native to the Indian Ocean and Pacific Ocean. It is known from Australia, Indonesia, Japan and Hawaiʻi. It is associated with shelf waters, and will rise to the upper water column at night to feed. Females spawn eggs 0.9–1.5 mm in diameter in gelatinous strings.
