= Gilbert L. Voss =

- Born: February 12, 1918; Hypoluxo, Florida, U.S.
- Died: January 23, 1989 (aged 70); Miami, Florida, U.S.
- Siglum: Voss
- Citizenship: American
- Education: University of Miami; George Washington University (Ph.D.)
- Known for: Cephalopod systematics (Teuthology), Establishing John Pennekamp Coral Reef State Park, Florida Keys conservation
- Scientific career
- Fields: Oceanography, Marine Biology, Conservation
- Workplaces: University of Miami, Woods Hole Oceanographic Institution
- Author abbrev. (zoology): Voss

Gilbert L. Voss (1918 – 23 January 1989) was an American conservationist and oceanographer. He was one of the main persons behind the establishment of John Pennekamp Coral Reef State Park in Key Largo, Florida and he spoke out successfully against several proposed real estate developments that might have threatened the ecology of the Florida Keys.

== Early life and education ==
Voss was born in Hypoluxo, Florida, in 1918, the son of early South Florida pioneers Captain Frederick C. Voss and his wife Lillie Pierce Voss, who was inducted into the Florida Women's Hall of Fame in 2012. His father was a boat captain and steam engineer. Voss grew up on the water, sailing and fishing. Voss had two brothers, Frederick Jr. and Walter, both of whom were guides and captains in tuna and bill fishing tournaments throughout Florida and the Caribbean.

He earned bachelor's and master's degrees from the University of Miami and a doctorate from George Washington University.

== Career ==
In 1951, Voss began his career at the University of Miami in 1951. From 1962 to 1973, he was chairman of the University of Miami's biology department. He was a research fellow at Woods Hole Oceanographic Institute, editor of the Bulletin of Marine Science and editor of Studies in Tropical Oceanography. He was a professor at the university's Rosenstiel School of Marine, Atmospheric, and Earth Science when he retired in 1988.

Voss published over 200 items, including 73 book reviews, 16 editorials, and 124 research papers on such diverse topics as cephalopods, fishes, crustaceans, botany, zoogeography, history of oceanography, anthropology, archaeology, fisheries, and marine and deep sea biology. He authored or co-authored descriptions of two new families or subfamilies, 6 new genera and more than 65 new species or subspecies.

A teuthologist, Voss "served the leading role in American cephalopod research for nearly 40 years".

So important is his influence on the resurgence of cephalopod systematic research, hardly a paper has been published in cephalopod systematics and zoogeography, and even other aspects of cephalopod biology and fisheries, that doesn't cite at least one paper published by Voss. This has been the case for nearly 4 decades and it will continue to be so for many decades into the 21st Century.

Voss authored the books Seashore Life of Florida and the Caribbean and Coral Reefs of Florida. A species of swimming crab, Portunus vossi, is named after him.

== Personal life ==
Voss was married to Nancy A. Voss (1929–2020), a Research Professor Emeritus and Museum Director at the University of Miami's Rosenstiel School of Marine, Atmospheric, and Earth Science. His son, Robert Voss, is the curator of the Department of Mammalogy on the Division of Vertebrate Zoology at the American Museum of Natural History.
