= Raphael Meldola =

British chemist and entomologist

- Raphael Meldola portrait by Solomon Joseph Solomon in the National Portrait Gallery, London
- Born: 19 July 1849
- Died: 16 November 1915 (aged 66)
- Education: Royal College of Chemistry
- Awards: Davy Medal (1913)
- Scientific career
- Fields: Chemistry
- Workplaces: University of London

Raphael Meldola FRS (19 July 1849 – 16 November 1915) was a British chemist and naturalist with a special interest in the butterflies and their coloration. He worked in the dye industry when German and British companies were trying to produce new dyes for the textile industry. The British chemical industry showed little interest in patenting and using his research. He then became a professor of chemistry at Finsbury Technical College in 1885 and served as a professor of Organic Chemistry in the University of London, 1912–15. He was also a evolutionary biologist and took a keen interest in the evolution of butterfly mimicry.

== Birth ==
Born in Islington, London, he was descended from and named after his grandfather Hakham Raphael Meldola (1754–1828), a theologian who was acting minister of the Spanish and Portuguese Sephardic Jews in London. Meldola was the only son of Samuel Meldola; married (1886) Ella Frederica, daughter of Maurice Davis of London. The Meldola family traced their family tree to Isaiah Meldola, who died at Toledo in 1340.

== Education ==
Meldola was educated at private Jewish schools in Bristol, Kew and then at Northwick College, Maida Hill before entering the Royal College of Chemistry, London (then the chemistry department of the London’s Royal School of Mines) in 1866, where he studied under Edward Frankland. His first naturalist contact was John Keast Lord. Lord was a major inspiration in his life and he was at Lord's deathbed in 1872. An early entomologist friend was William John Argent. He closely followed the scientific advances of his time including the 1859 work on evolution by Charles Darwin and William Henry Perkin's synthesis of aniline. In the 1860s he collected insects in Epping Forest and around Essex and he began to correspond with Darwin around 1871. August Kekule's work on benzene in 1865 opened up synthetic chemistry and the role of predictable laws that guided chemical reactions. A parallel interest in chemistry and biology made him seek theoretical structure in science.

== Career ==
Meldola worked in the private laboratory of John Stenhouse (FRS 1848) who was then an assayer in the Royal Mint. In 1870, he became a laboratory assistant at the firm of Williams, Thomas & Dower of Brantford, where he first worked on coal-tar dyes. He was appointed Lecturer, Royal College of Science (1872) and assisted Norman Lockyer with spectroscopy. Meldola was in charge of the British Eclipse Expedition (Transit of Venus) to the Nicobar Islands (1875). He took photographs and also collected insect specimens in the Andaman and Nicobar Islands. In 1877 he moved to Atlas Works, Brooke, Simpson & Spiller where he developed a green dye called Alkaline Green or Viridine. In 1879 he discovered what was called Meldola blue.

=== Meldola Blue and other dyes ===

The 1870s were a period of intense research in dyes with German and British workers competing. In 1879, Meldola found a blue dye that was similar to methylene blue developed by Heinrich Caro. It was tried as a substitute for indigo. In 1883 he developed Alkali Blue XG while working for Brooke, Simpson & Spiller. This was not patented and it was quickly used by German companies. The lack of interest by the company was one of the reasons for him to move to Finsbury Technical College in 1885. Meldola blue continues to be used in biological research.

In 1906, Adolf von Baeyer received the Nobel Prize for his work on Indigo and the English industry had fallen behind. Meldola was involved in organizing a celebration of the discovery of mauve by Sir William Perkin in 1856. It was conducted on 26 July and it was attended by a German delegation led by Heinrich Caro. The ladies at the function wore mauve clothes. A portrait of Perkin was unveiled and in 1907, Perkin inaugurated a bust of him made by F A Pomeroy that was placed in the Chemical Society.

=== Professor of chemistry ===
Meldola became in 1885, Professor of Chemistry, Technical College, Finsbury. He attempted to get more interest to support research in the British chemical industry and was disappointed by it. He often wrote about the German industry. Towards the end of his life he was made an advisor to British Dyes Limited in 1915.

Meldola was a member of many scientific societies apart from being a founding member of the Institute of Chemistry in 1877. This included being a Fellow of the Royal Astronomical Society; Fellow of the Institute of Chemistry; Fellow of the Chemical Society (London and Berlin); Member of the Pharmaceutical Society; The Geologists Association; The Royal Anthropological Institute; Entomological Society of London. He was elected Fellow of the Royal Society in 1886 (Charles Darwin was one of his proposers), awarded the Davy Medal in 1913, and was vice-president of the council from 1914 to 1915. Meldola had no formal degree beyond his diploma from the School of Mines. In 1910 he received an honorary DSc from Oxford and in 1911 he received an honorary LLD from St Andrews. Meldola was offered the French Legion of Honour twice but was advised by the British Foreign Office to turn it down.

=== Entomology, insect mimicry and evolution ===
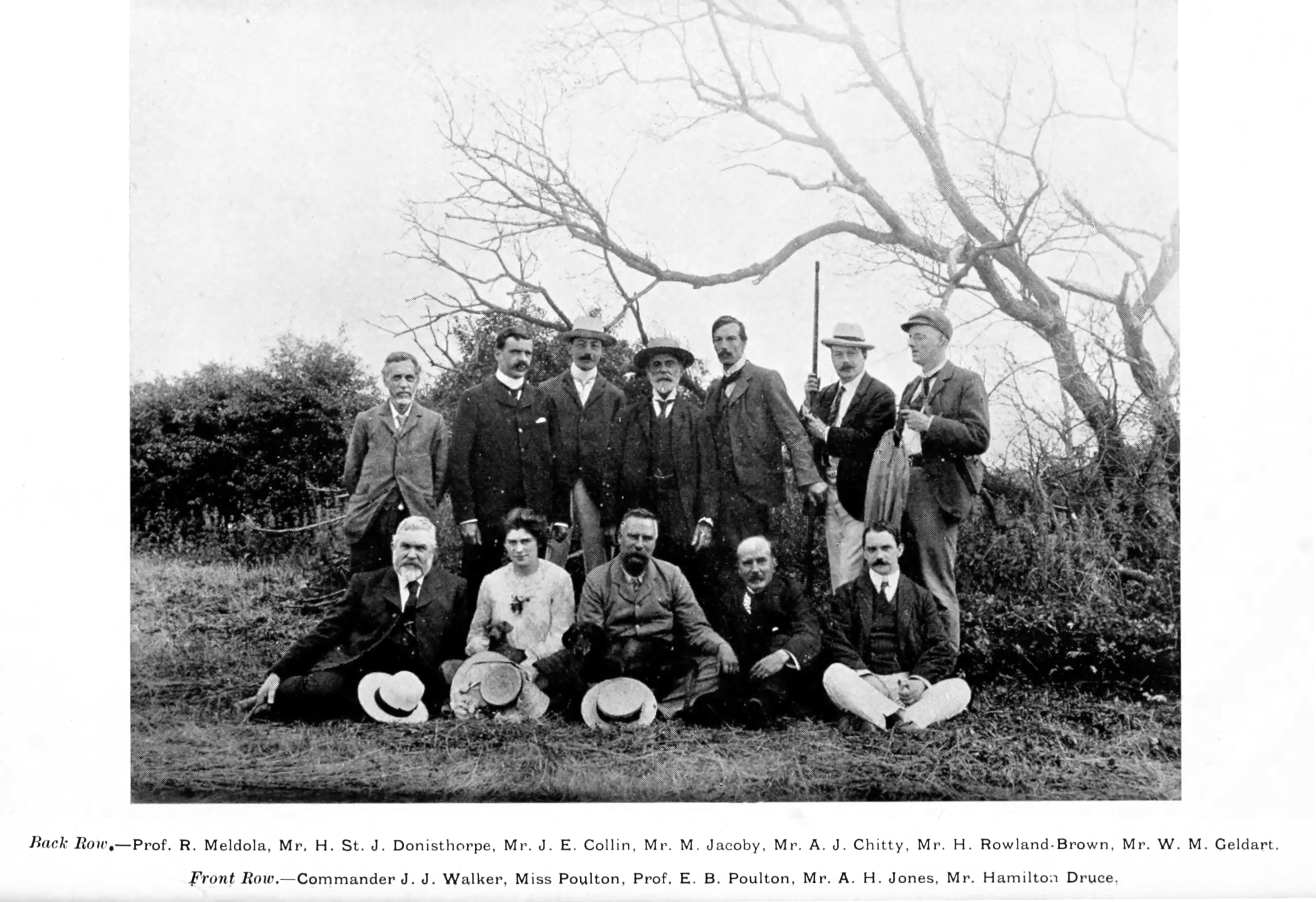
Meldola with the Entomological Society in 1904 (standing, left)

Meldola was a keen naturalist from the late 1850s, spending five years eagerly collecting evidence on Batesian and Mullerian mimicry in butterflies, inspired by Charles Darwin's On the Origin of Species. He later studied the mathematical models to explain mimicry. His work provided evidence for natural selection, acknowledged by the evolutionary zoologist Edward Bagnall Poulton in his book The Colours of Animals and thanked by Darwin for information on hexadactyly (a rare case of a person having six digits on each limb). Darwin encouraged him to publish a translation of Weismann's "Studies in the Theory of Descent." In 1891 he reviewed the objections published by Francis Pascoe to Darwin's ideas based on his studies of beetles.

Meldola gave the presidential lecture in 1906 to the Chemical Society that was a philosophical exploration of life as a complex chemical system by examining photosynthesis. He considered science to be indivisible. In 1910, Meldola gave the Herbert Spencer lecture in Oxford on 'Evolution, Darwinian and Spencerian.'

Meldola was President of the Entomological Society, 1895–1897; the Chemical Society, 1905–1907; Society of Dyers and Colourists, 1907–1910; Society of Chemical Industry 1908–1909; Institute of Chemistry, 1912–1915. He was the first president of the Maccabaeans, 1891–1915. Meldola was involved in the establishment of the Sylvester medal in pure mathematics. A Meldola medal was instituted in 1922 for chemical research by the Maccabaeans. It was designed by Frank Bowcher and the award was to be administered by the Royal Society of Chemistry. A library was established in his memory at Finsbury College.

Meldola married Ella Frederica (1863–1932), daughter of surgeon Maurice Davis in 1886. They had no children. He died at his home in Brunswick Square, London and was buried in the Sephardi Jew cemetery in Hendon.
