= Sydney Barber Josiah Skertchly =

English and Australian botanist and geologist

Skertchly in 1871

Sydney Barber Josiah Skertchly (14 December 1850 – 2 February 1926) was an English and later Australian botanist and geologist. He described and mapped the geology of East Anglia and The Fens, travelled the world exploring geology and other aspects of science, and became influential in scientific societies in Queensland.

== Biography ==
=== Early life ===
Born in Anstey, Leicestershire, Skertchly was the son of an English engineer, Joseph Skertchly, and Sarah Moseley, née Barber. He was educated at King Edward's School, Ashby-de-la-Zouch where he won the Queen's gold medal for science. He studied geology at the Royal School of Mines (later Imperial College, London) under Sir Ralph Tate and Thomas H. Huxley.

=== Career ===
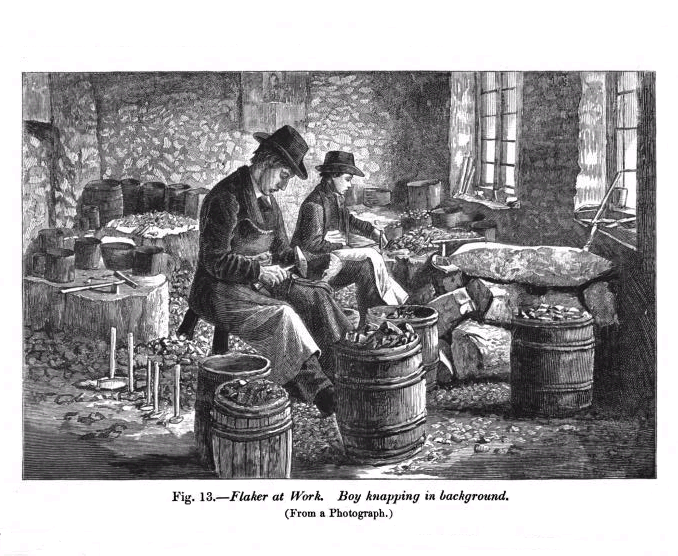
Illustration from Skertchly's On the manufacture of Gun-Flints, 1879

He then worked as assistant curator to the Geological Society, London, with Sir Charles Lyell. In 1869 he began to travel, becoming assistant geologist to Ismail Pasha, khedive of Egypt. He worked in East Anglia for the British Geological Survey, studying and making maps of the geologically young strata there, as well as writing on the gun-flint industry which exploited the local flints. He described and named the Brandon Beds which lie under the Boulder clay.

Skertchly sent Charles Darwin a copy of his Geology of the Fenland in 1878. Darwin replied with a gift of his Origin of Species. He also corresponded with Darwin's rival and co-discoverer of natural selection, Alfred Russel Wallace.

In around 1880, while working as an assistant geologist with the British Geological Survey, he was involved in an accident while at work, in which his seven-year old son Cyril Edwin Kemp Skertchly was killed, and which left him "unable to do any work for some years to come". He wrote to Darwin requesting a testimonial, in order to obtain secure an improved Treasury pension.

He travelled to California, Borneo, and China, studying and writing on geology and wider scientific subjects. He pioneered the first ever series of science textbooks written by scientists rather than school teachers, and a system for showing relief on maps. He became professor of Botany in Hong Kong. When war broke out in 1891 between China and Japan, he moved to Brisbane, Australia. He gave many lectures on geology there, and wrote on science and natural history for the Brisbane Courier.

=== Societies ===
Skertchly became a member of the Geological Society, London, in 1871, and of the Royal Anthropological Institute in 1880. He was president of the Royal Society of Queensland in 1898. He founded and was the first president of the Field Naturalists' Club in 1906. He was examining board president of the Queensland Institute of Ophthalmic Opticians from 1910 to 1925, and president of the Child Study Association of Queensland.

=== Family and later life ===
Skertchly married Rachel Ellen Kemp on 26 June 1871 in London, and they travelled around France and Italy together. She illustrated Colouration in Animals and Plants (1886) for him. They had a daughter, Ruby, who married Edward James Cooper of 'Birribon', Carrara near Nerang, Queensland in Australia, and at least three sons. The aforesaid Cyril Edwin Kemp died aged 7, while Harold Brandon and Ethelbert Forbes each died during military service. The Skertchlys retired to Nerang near their daughter and her family. Rachel Skertchly died in 1919 and Professor Skertchly died on 2 February 1926 in Molendinar, Queensland. Both are buried in Nerang cemetery.

== Works ==
- (1877). The Geology of the Fenland
- with Whitaker, William (1878?). The Geology of South-Western Norfolk and of Northern Cambridgeshire: (Explanation of Sheet 65).
- (1878). The Physical System of the Universe. An outline of physiography.
- with Miller, S.H. (1878). The Fenland past and present ... With engravings, maps and diagrams.
- (1879). On the manufacture of Gun-Flints, the methods of excavating for flint, the age of palæolithic man, and the connection between neolithic art and the gun-flint trade.
- completing work of Tylor, Alfred (1886). Colouration in Animals and Plants.
- (1894) The future of the Port of Shanghai : a geological study.
- (1898). On the geology of the country round Stanthorpe and Warwick, South Queensland,: With especial reference to the tin and gold fields and the silver deposits. Queensland: Geological survey.

== See also ==
- Adaptive Coloration in Animals (Cott, 1940)
- The Colours of Animals (Poulton, 1890)

== Bibliography ==
- Marks, E.N. (1988). "Skertchly, Sydney Barber Josiah (1850–1926)". Australian Dictionary of Biography Vol. 11, (MUP). National Centre of Biography, Australian National University.
- McCarthy, G.J. (20 October 1993). "Encyclopedia of Australian Science". Skertchly, Sydney Barber Josiah (1850–1926). EOAS.info.
