= Animal Coloration (book) =

1892 book by Frank Evers Beddard

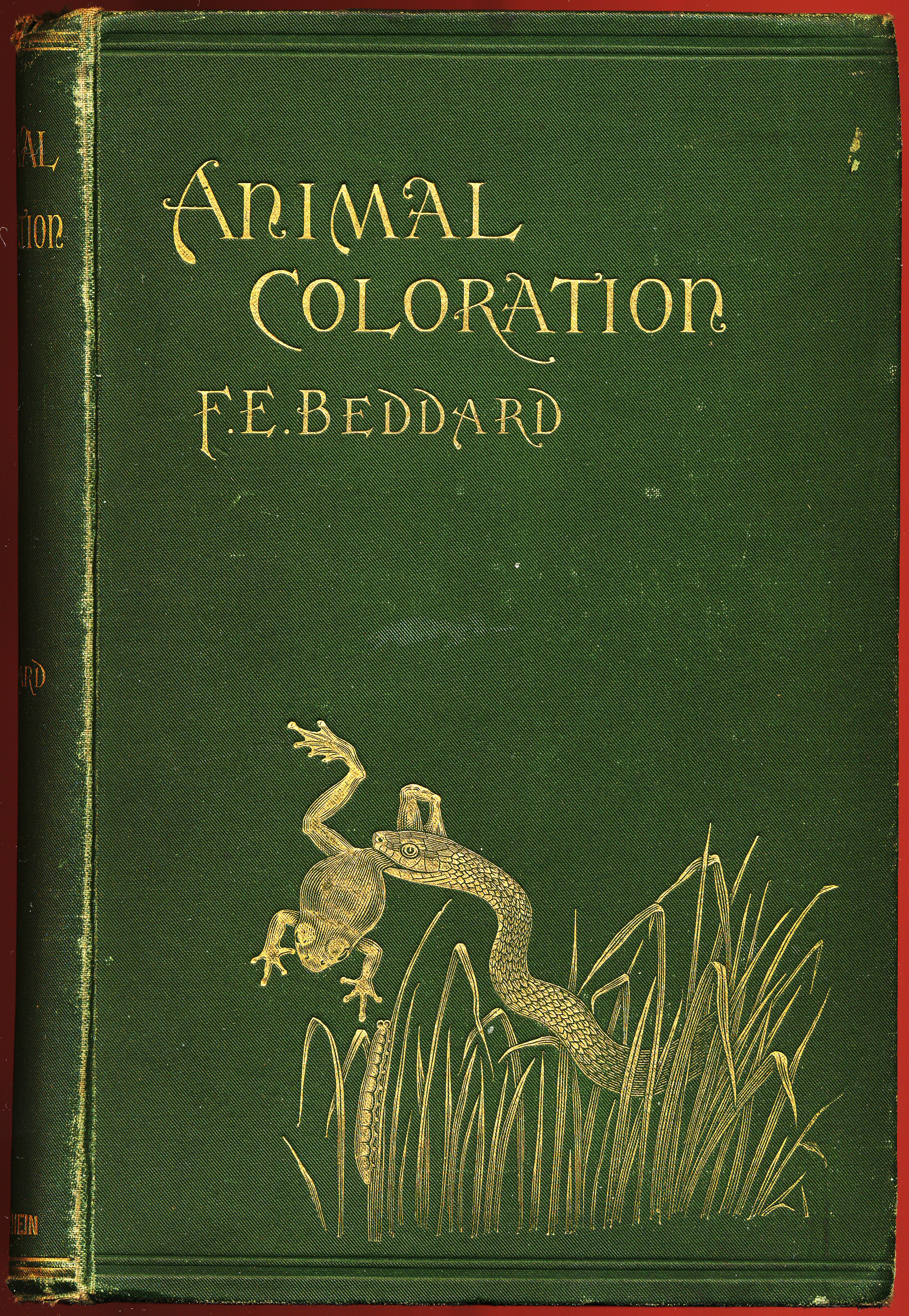
- Cover of first edition
- Author: Frank Evers Beddard
- Illustrator: Peter Smit and others
- Subject: Camouflage
- Genre: Natural history
- Publisher: Swan Sonnenschein
- Publication date: 1892
- Publication place: United Kingdom

Animal Coloration, or in full Animal Coloration: An Account of the Principal Facts and Theories Relating to the Colours and Markings of Animals, is a book by the English zoologist Frank Evers Beddard, published by Swan Sonnenschein in 1892. It formed part of the ongoing debate amongst zoologists about the relevance of Charles Darwin's theory of natural selection to the observed appearance, structure, and behaviour of animals, and vice versa.

Beddard states in the book that it contains little that is new, intending instead to give a clear overview of the subject. The main topics covered are camouflage, then called 'protective coloration'; mimicry; and sexual selection. Arguments for and against these aspects of animal coloration are intensively discussed in the book.

The book was reviewed in 1892 by the major journals including The Auk, Nature, and Science. The scientist reviewers Joel Asaph Allen, Edward Bagnall Poulton and Robert Wilson Shufeldt took up different positions on the book and accordingly praised or criticized Beddard's work.

Modern evaluation of the book is from a variety of perspectives, including the history of Darwinism, the history of the Thayer debate on the purpose of camouflage, the mechanisms of camouflage, sexual selection, and mimicry. Beddard is seen as having covered a wide swath of modern biology with both theory and experiment.

== Context ==
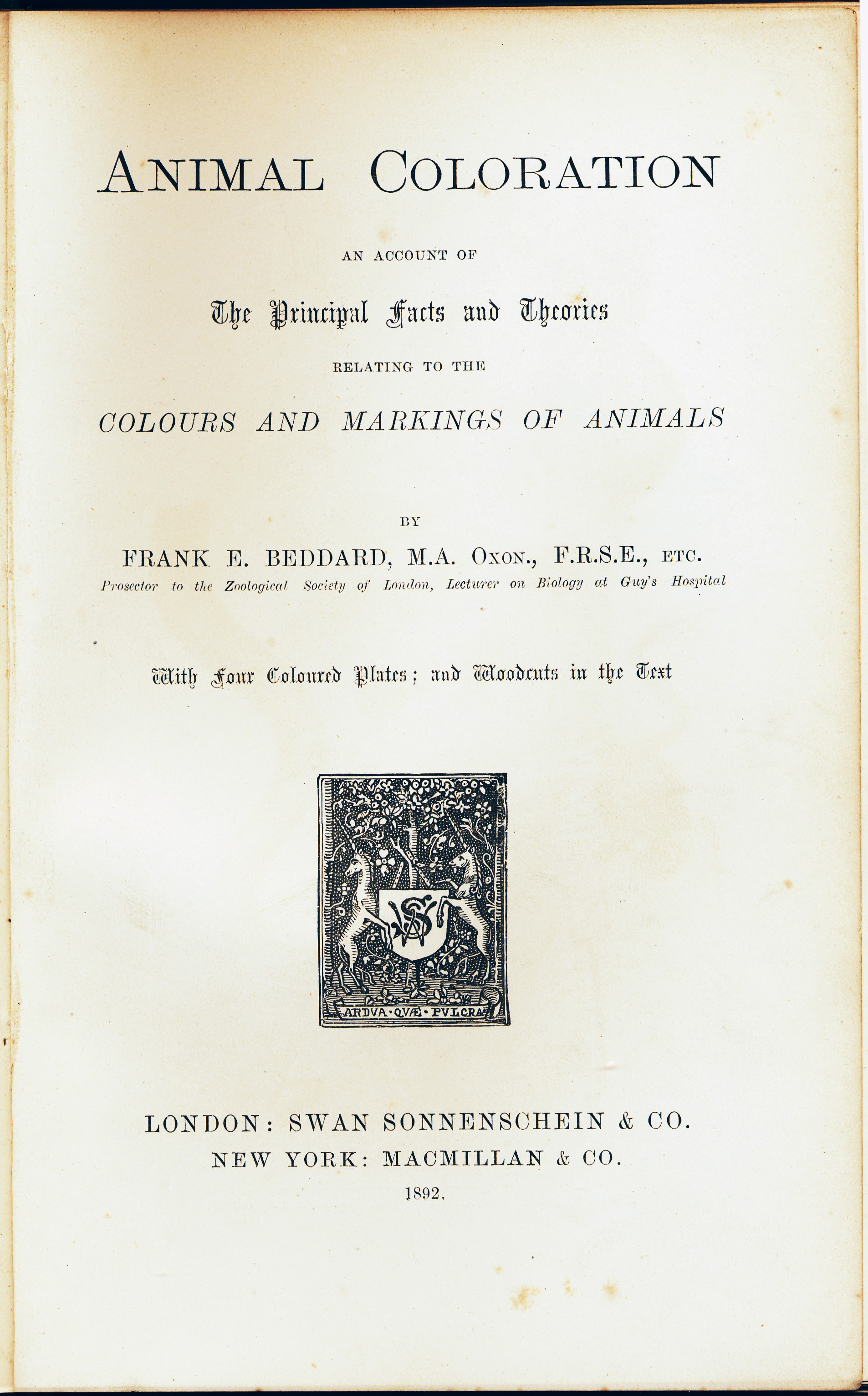
Title page of first edition, 1892

Beddard (1858–1925) was an English zoologist specializing in Annelid worms, but writing much more widely on topics including mammals and zoogeography. He also contributed articles on earthworms, leeches and nematode worms to the 1911 Encyclopædia Britannica. His decision to write an accessible book on animal coloration falls into this pattern. Beddard wrote Animal Coloration at a time when scientists' confidence in Charles Darwin's theory of evolution by natural selection was at a low ebb. Beddard's book (Note: Beddard, 1892.) was part of an ongoing debate among zoologists about how far natural selection affected animals, and how far other forces – such as the direct action of light – might be the causes of observed features such as the colours of animals. Edward Bagnall Poulton's far more strongly pro-Darwinian book The Colours of Animals had appeared just two years earlier in 1890.

== Approach ==
Beddard explains in his preface that the book grew from his 1890 Davis Lectures given for the public at London Zoo. The book "contains hardly anything novel, but professes to give some account of the principal phenomena of coloration exhibited by animals." (Note: Beddard, 1892. p. iii.) He also notes that since Poulton's recent book "deal[s] with colour almost entirely from the point of view of natural selection, I have attempted to lay some stress upon other aspects of the question." Similarly, because Poulton treated insects in some detail, Beddard chooses to give more attention to other groups, though "it is impossible not to devote a good deal of space to insects". (Note: Beddard, 1892. p. iv.) The examples are mainly from Beddard's own observation of "animals that may be usually seen in the Zoological Society's Gardens", though he also introduces and quotes the work of other scientists, including Henry Walter Bates and Alfred Russel Wallace.

=== Illustrations ===
The book has four colour plates by Peter Smit, who both drew and prepared the chromolithographic plates. Plate 1 is stated in the List of Illustrations "To face page 108", but as bound in the first edition it is used as a Frontispiece, facing the title page.

There are also 36 woodcuts (in black and white) in the text, though one of these, "Eolis and Dendronotus" is intentionally repeated as figures 10 and 19 to accompany the text in two places. The woodcuts vary from small line drawings on a simple white background (as in the diagrammatic figure 28 of Psyche helix, and figure 34 of the winter moth) to page-width illustrations like figure 2 which shows ermines in winter pelage, in a realistic depiction with a detailed snowy scene in the background. The woodcuts are certainly by a number of different artists; many are unsigned, but figures 5 and 26 are signed "E.A. Brockhaus X.A" lower right (X=cut, A=Artist), while figure 29 is signed "GM" lower left, and figures 35 and 36 are signed "ES" lower left. Figure 2 bears a monograph "FR", lower left, and figure 7, of the penguin Aptenodytes patagonica is stated to be "from Brehm" (Brehms Tierleben).

== Structure ==
Animal Coloration has a simple structure of six chapters in its 288 pages.

1. Introductory

Beddard distinguishes colour, when an animal has just one, from coloration, when there is some kind of pattern of two or more colours. He discusses the mechanisms of colour production, both structural coloration and pigments, and the reasons for coloration, including the red of haemoglobin used to carry oxygen. Non-adaptive coloration is considered, and a section argues that "the action of natural selection in producing colour changes must be strictly limited".

2. Coloration affected by the environment

In this chapter Beddard continues to explore the possible direct effect of the environment, i.e. with "no possible relation to natural selection". (Note: Beddard, 1892. p. 42.) The effects of different foods, temperature and humidity are discussed. Beddard argues against Poulton's view that natural selection has removed the pigment from cave-dwelling animals, agreeing rather with Wallace that pigment is produced as a by-product. Beddard grants that the change to white of arctic animals in winter looks like natural selection, rather than a direct effect of the environment, but argues that some animals do not change, including the musk ox which he describes as "comparatively defenceless".

3. Protective coloration

Plate II, "Kallima butterfly". (How many insects are in the image?)

"Protection" is a shorthand in Beddard's vocabulary for camouflage necessitated by natural selection, whether of prey for defence against predators hunting by sight, or of predators concealing themselves for attack on watchful prey. He mentions that Wallace includes the green of tree-frequenting animals and the tawny of desert animals under "General Protective Resemblance", and mentions his own experiments which agree with Poulton's observation that lizards "do pass over and leave unnoticed protectively coloured caterpillars". (Note: Beddard, 1892. p. 92.) However, Beddard continually tests the validity of this explanation:

Plate I, A group of protectively coloured animals

Comparative Rarity of Green tree-frequenting Animals an Argument in favour of Selection
It is not a little surprising to find how few green animals there are ... it is precisely because the sandy colour of desert animals and the transparency of pelagic organisms is so universal, that some general environmental cause appears to be necessary for the explanation of the facts; on the other hand, the picking and choosing among arboreal animals savours distinctly of natural selection. (Note: Beddard, 1892. pp. 108-109.)

He observes that "Every naturalist traveller appears to have some instance to relate of how he was taken in by a protectively-coloured insect. These stories are told with a curiously exaggerated delight at the deception...", giving as example how Professor Drummond in his book Tropical Africa thought a mantid was a wisp of hay. He picks up on the casually mentioned fact that Drummond's African companion was not deceived, writing that we should not judge camouflage "from the human standpoint". (Note: Beddard, 1892. pp. 109-110.)

On the other hand, Beddard writes that people who had only seen the giraffe, zebra, and jaguar in the zoo would think them "among the most conspicuously coloured of the Mammalia", but that seen "in their native countries" they are "most difficult to detect". (Note: Beddard, 1892. p. 85.)

The chapter ends with a discussion of animals that can change colour, including fish like the sole, the chameleon, the horned lizards and the tree frogs including the European species Hyla arborea. He cites Poulton's suggestion that the tree frog's camouflage may be both defensive (protecting from predators) and aggressive (facilitating the hunting of insects). (Note: Beddard, 1892. pp. 140-147.)

4. Warning coloration

Plate III, "Group of animals exhibiting warning coloration". Illustrated are a wasp, a cinnabar moth and its caterpillar larva, a wasp beetle, and a fire salamander.

In this chapter Beddard discusses the warning coloration (aposematism) of animals, which he notes "have a precisely opposite tendency" to camouflage, "viz., to render their possessor conspicuous". He at once says that the explanation was "first devised by Mr. Wallace" for insects. The chapter therefore begins with the insects, often using English species as examples. He examines critically whether eye-like markings and other warnings actually work. He discusses experiments by Poulton on the elephant hawk-moth, where a sand lizard is only briefly startled, (Note: Beddard, 1892. p. 152.) and his own at the London zoo using a range of predators and different insects. (Note: Beddard, 1892. pp. 153-156.) Beddard is only partially convinced, flirting with Dr. Eisig's theory that the pigments creating the colours of caterpillars are inherently distasteful, and hence that "the brilliant colours (i.e. the abundant secretion of pigment) have caused the inedibility of the species, rather than that the inedibility has necessitated the production of bright colours as an advertisement." So Beddard suggests that "the advent of bird-life proved a disastrous event for these animals, and compelled them to undergo various modifications", except when they were already by luck warning coloured and distasteful. (Note: Beddard, 1892. p. 173.)

5. Protective mimicry

Plate IV Volucellae and Bees. The hoverflies are harmless Batesian mimics of the stinging bees.

This chapter discusses Batesian mimicry, also mentioning observations and opinions of Fritz Müller and Wallace. Beddard grants that Bates's theory is very strongly supported by the observations that Bates made in South America, especially on butterflies, though again he tests the evolutionary explanation in different cases. He cites Wallace's rules of mimicry, such as that the imitators are always the more defenceless, and always less numerous, than their models, (Note: Beddard, 1892. p. 206.) as covering all the examples he has given. However, he then states various objections, including that "the Danaidae, themselves an uneatable race of butterflies and models for mimicry, resemble in South America the uneatable Heliconiidae". He points out that this does not meet any of Wallace's rules so it is "not a case of true mimicry", but is "supposed rather to be like that which is seen between various other unpalatable animals". Müllerian mimicry is not mentioned explicitly in the book, though Beddard does write that this example "tends to the advantage of the insects, for their enemies have to learn fewer colours and patterns, and thus are less likely to make mistakes, than if the lesson to be learnt were an excessively complicated one." (Note: Beddard, 1892. pp. 212-213.)

By the end, Beddard concludes that "Nevertheless, cases of mimicry that do occur—particularly among Lepidoptera—are often so striking that no other explanation ... seems to account for the finishing touches, at least, of the resemblance". He remains sceptical of cases "which are to be appreciated only by insects", as he considers that insects might not have good enough vision for mimicry to work. (Note: Beddard, 1892. p. 252.)

6. Sexual coloration

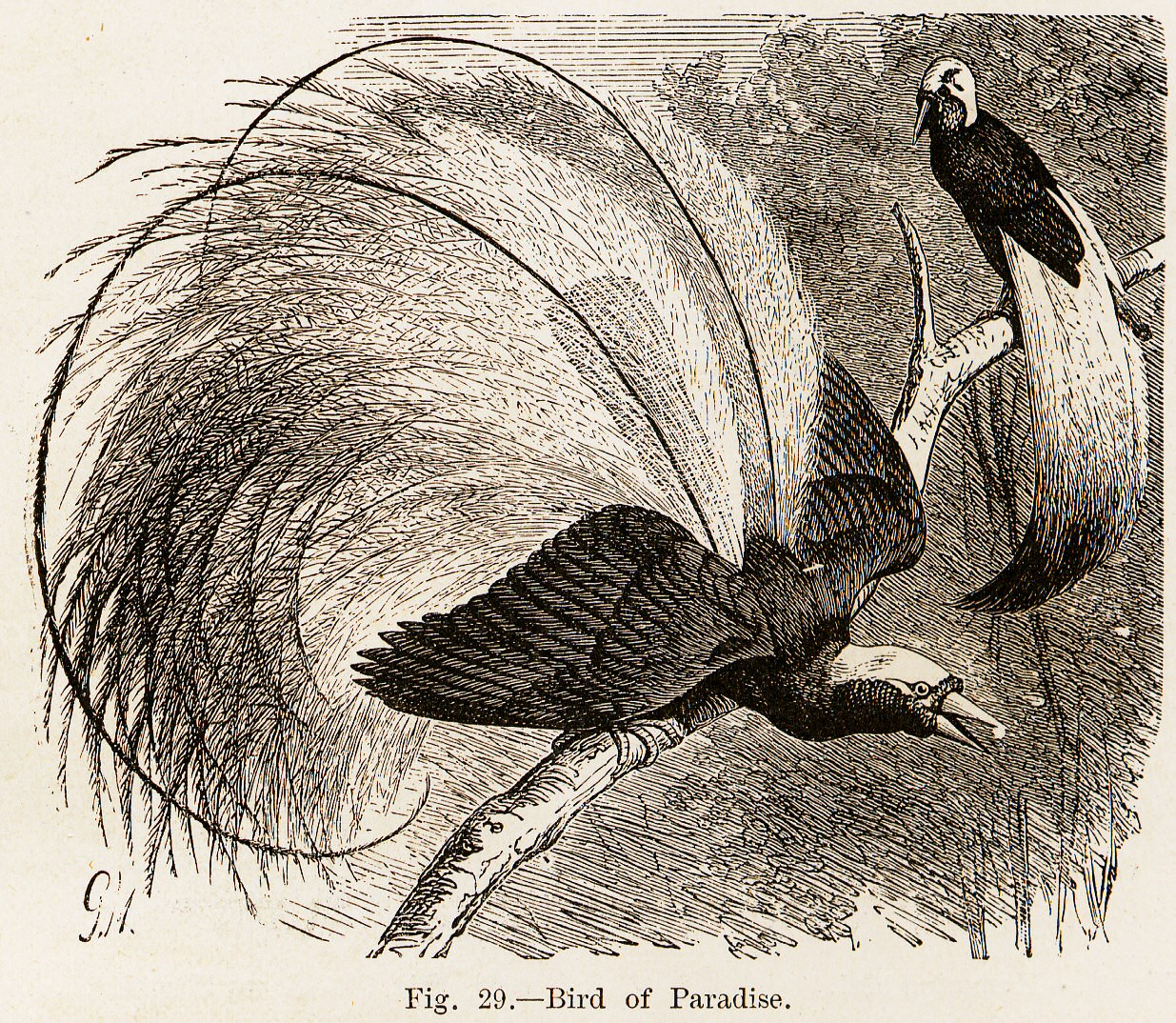
"Bird of Paradise", probably Paradisaea apoda

The final chapter begins with examples of sexual dimorphism, such as "the antlers of the stag, the spurs of the cock... and the gorgeous plumes found in the males of the birds of paradise", with other examples chosen from across the animal kingdom. Darwin's theory of sexual selection is explained; Beddard then states the objection that female birds must be supposed to have "a highly-developed aesthetic sense" to choose between similar-looking males, and worse, that females of closely related species must have "immense[ly]" different tastes. He concludes, though, that the question cannot be answered by what we consider improbable, but requires "actual observation". (Note: Beddard, 1892. pp. 265-266.) He calls Poulton's arguments for sexual selection "very ingenious", but writes that Wallace's two different (non-selective) explanations "might both be accepted". He concludes that "it is quite possible that sexual selection may have played a subordinate part" in producing sexually dimorphic coloration. (Note: Beddard, 1892. p. 282.)

== Reception ==
=== Contemporary ===
==== The Auk ====
The American zoologist and ornithologist Joel Asaph Allen reviewed Animal Coloration in The Auk in 1893. Allen notes Beddard's remark that the book contains hardly anything novel, so that it is mainly a review of previous theories, but welcomes it as a review of the state of knowledge together with Beddard's critical commentary. Allen notes that Beddard could have gone further in criticising Weismann and Poulton on colour changes, but is "glad to see [that Beddard] is willing to grant that the influence of an animal's surroundings may exercise a direct influence upon its coloration without the intervention of the agency of 'natural selection.'"

Allen praises Beddard's "commendable conservatism" in his discussion of camouflage, which he compares to the "credulous spirit" of other authors. Reviewing the chapter on warning coloration, Allen remarks that the great horned owl is known to prey on the skunk, showing that even such a disagreeably pungent animal can be subject to predation.

On mimicry, Allen is critical of Bates's theory, arguing that edible mimics (such as flies) are often not protected by resembling distasteful models (such as wasps). Allen notes that Beddard deals with many special cases "as of .. spiders mimicking ants, etc." and finds the arguments against any selective advantage from Batesian mimicry, and so against natural selection, somewhat conclusive. Finally, reviewing the chapter on sexual selection, Allen writes (knowing that Wallace largely rejected sexual selection)

Mr. Beddard appears to wholly reject Mr. Darwin's much admired theory of 'Sexual Selection,' and quotes at length Mr. Wallace's reductio ad absurdum, which, as illustrating the view of an ultra natural selectionist, may well be here transcribed...

Allen then makes some remarks, praising Beddard for the "fine vein of irony" that he uses of

alleged instances of sexual selection, as in respect to the mating and 'love dances' of spiders. But on the whole his criticisms are suggestive rather than aggressive." and concludes with "we are glad to welcome so healthy an antidote to this mild phase of scientific lunacy as Mr. Beddard's book on 'Animal Coloration.'

==== Nature ====
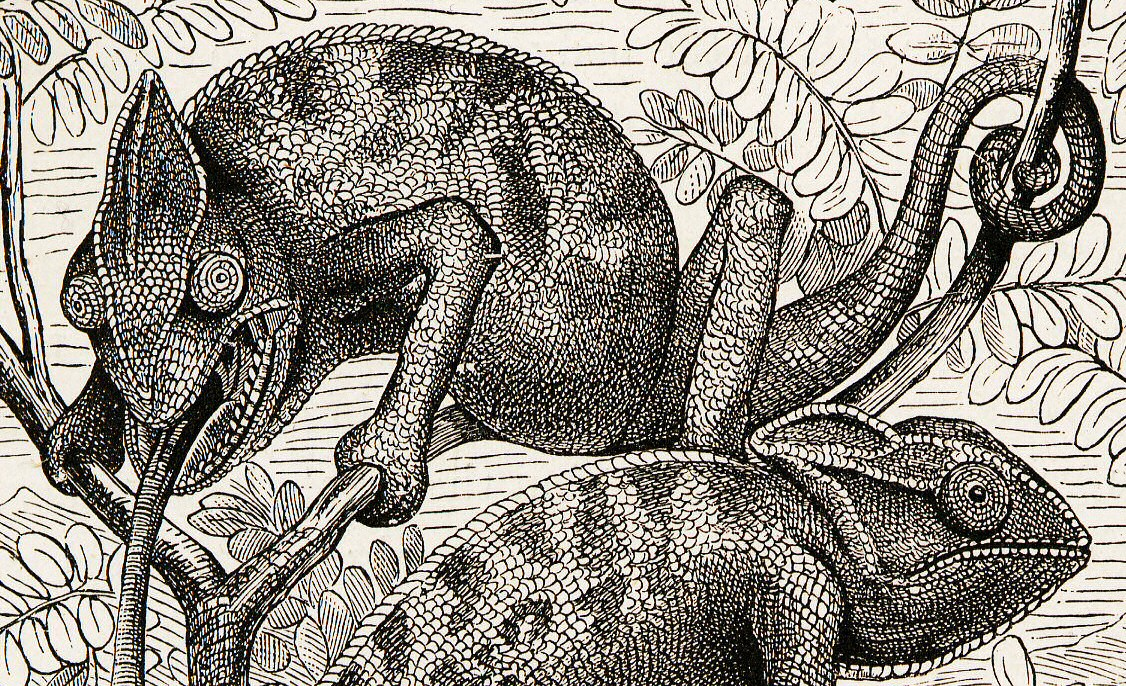
Detail of Figure 15, "Chameleon"

The zoologist Edward Bagnall Poulton, whose work is referred to throughout Beddard's book, reviewed Animal Coloration in Nature in 1892. Poulton is critical of Beddard and other authors, defending Darwin's theory of natural selection as "the most generally accepted explanation of organic evolution" and insisting that in "case after case" the Darwinian explanation turns out to be correct.

==== Science ====
The white supremacist scientist Robert Wilson Shufeldt reviewed Animal Coloration in Science in 1892, praising it as a concise and useful summary of the subject. He admires Macmillan Publishers' handling of the book with its attractive wood-cuts and coloured lithographic plates. He is pleased to find many Americans in the index. He quotes Beddard's distinction between colour and coloration. He considers that the book brings readers fully up to date and even adds a few new ideas. He recommends the book to all working American naturalists.

==== Popular Science Monthly ====
The anonymous reviewer in Popular Science Monthly in December 1892 writes that Beddard has "made a book interesting to both the zoologist and the general reader." On protective coloration, "he raises the question whether as a matter of fact animals are concealed from their foes by their protective resemblances, and shows that there is much evidence on the negative side", and further that such colours are sometimes produced "more simply and directly than by the operation of natural selection." On warning colours, the reviewer notes that Beddard gives "much weight" to Eisig's theory that "the usual bright pigments" in caterpillars (accidentally) cause inedibility, "instead of being produced to advertise it" and that Beddard cautions against assuming that "the sight or taste of animals were the same as that of man".

=== Modern ===
Beddard's Animal Coloration is cited and discussed both by historians of science, and by practising scientists from a number of different fields. For example, the book illuminates the progress of Darwinism, camouflage research, sexual selection, mimicry and the debate on the purpose of animal coloration triggered by Abbott Thayer. These areas are described in turn below.

==== Darwinism ====
The historian Robinson M. Yost explains that Darwinism went into eclipse during the 1890s. At that time, most zoologists felt that natural selection could not be the main cause of biological adaptation, and sought alternative explanations. As a result, many zoologists rejected both Batesian mimicry and Müllerian mimicry. Beddard, writes Yost, explained some problems in the theory of mimicry including that, given how many insect species there are, resemblances between species could arise by chance, and that mimicry was sometimes either useless or actually harmful. In Yost's view, Beddard wanted more evidence that natural selection really was responsible. Yost cites the staunch Darwinist Poulton's hostile review of 1892, which asserts the pre-eminence of Darwin's theory. But, writes Yost, Beddard was not alone in being wary of natural selection.

==== Camouflage ====
The zoologist Martin Stevens and colleagues, in 2006, write that "almost all early discussions of camouflage were of the background-matching type", citing Wallace, Poulton, and Beddard, "until the pioneering work of Thayer (1909) and Cott (1940)", which added disruptive coloration. Cott however both makes use of Beddard as an authority (for the fact that the Hudson's Bay lemming turns white in winter whereas the Scandinavian lemming does not, and for his experiments on the effectiveness of prey coloration on predators) and is critical of him for the "extreme and illogical" opinion held by Beddard and other authors that keeping perfectly still is vital to camouflage. Cott pointed out on that subject that a cryptic colour scheme makes an animal harder to track and to recognize, even while it is moving.

==== Sexual selection ====
The ornithologist Geoffrey Edward Hill, writing in 2002, notes that both Poulton and Beddard discuss sexual selection, and both agreed that "sexual selection by female choice is a likely explanation for the bright coloration of at least some species of birds". In contrast, Hill observes, Cott's detailed 1940 book does not mention it at all; like other zoologists including Wallace and Huxley, Cott preferred explanations "firmly rooted in natural selection".

==== Mimicry ====
The American evolutionary zoologists Jane Van Zandt Brower and Lincoln Pierson Brower followed up the experiments described in the book (pp. 153–159). Beddard, they write, observed the results of feeding the drone fly Eristalis tenax, a harmless but intimidating Batesian mimic of honeybees, to various predators. A chameleon, a green lizard, and a sand skink eagerly consumed the flies, whereas a thrush and a great spotted woodpecker did not. However, they — like Cott before them, they note — were unable to replicate Beddard's claim that toads would eat insects of any kind, including stinging bees and wasps. They describe their own experimental investigations of bees and their drone fly mimics, like Beddard using toads as the predators, concluding that the Batesian mimicry of the honeybee by the drone fly was "highly effective".

==== The Thayer debate ====
The historian of science Sharon Kingsland, in a 1978 paper on Abbott Thayer and the protective coloration debate, uses Beddard repeatedly to illuminate the different strands of the argument. She quotes Beddard (p. 94) on how difficult the question of animal coloration seemed in the 1890s. Thayer — an artist, not a scientist — had dived head-first into the debate. One of the protagonists, notes Kingsland, was Allen, who had reviewed Beddard's book, and who believed that the environment directly influenced animal coloration — Kingsland cites Beddard p. 54 here —, so natural selection seemed to him an unlikely factor, and he pointed out that blending inheritance would dilute the effect of selection. Furthermore, argues Kingsland, again citing Beddard (p. 148), another major protagonist, Alfred Russel Wallace, was emphasizing the problem of conspicuous markings, which could be selected for as warning coloration.

Wallace went so far as to argue, notes Kingsland, that bright colours in sexual dimorphism "resulted from a surplus of vital energy", citing Beddard p. 263 ff. Thayer, on the other hand, had exactly one explanation for everything: natural selection for protective coloration, in particular camouflage by countershading, which radically departed from earlier explanations such as Allen's environmental influences (colours might be affected by light) or Beddard's suggestion that dolphins might have dark backs and light bellies as camouflage when seen from above and from below (Kingsland cites Beddard, p. 115).

== Bibliography ==
- Beddard, Frank Evers (1892). Animal Coloration, An Account of the Principal Facts and Theories Relating to the Colours and Markings of Animals. Swan Sonnenschein, London.
- Cott, Hugh Bamford (1940). Adaptive Coloration in Animals. Methuen, London.
- Darwin, Charles (1874). The Descent of Man. Heinemann, London.
- Darwin, Charles (1859). On the Origin of Species. John Murray, London. Reprinted 1985, Penguin Classics, Harmondsworth.
- Poulton, Edward Bagnall, Sir (1890). The Colours of Animals. London : Kegan Paul, Trench & Trübner.
- Thayer, Abbott Handerson and Thayer, Gerald H. (1909). Concealing-Coloration in the Animal Kingdom. New York.
