= Hope Professor of Zoology =

The Hope Professor of Zoology (Entomology) is a professorship at Oxford University. The first Hope Professor was John Obadiah Westwood. The current holder is Geraldine Wright. The position is associated with a professorial fellowship at Jesus College.

List of holders
Name	Start	End	Refs
John Obadiah Westwood	1860	1893	
Edward Bagnall Poulton	1893	1933	
Geoffrey Douglas Hale Carpenter	1933	1948	
George Copley Varley	1948	1980	
David Spencer Smith	1980	1995	
vacant	1995	2006	
Hugh Charles Jonathan Godfray	2006	2018	
vacant	2018	2021	
Geraldine Wright	2021	Incumbent	
