= The Colours of Animals =

1890 book by Edward Bagnall Poulton

The Colours of Animals: Their Meaning and Use Especially Considered in the Case of Insects
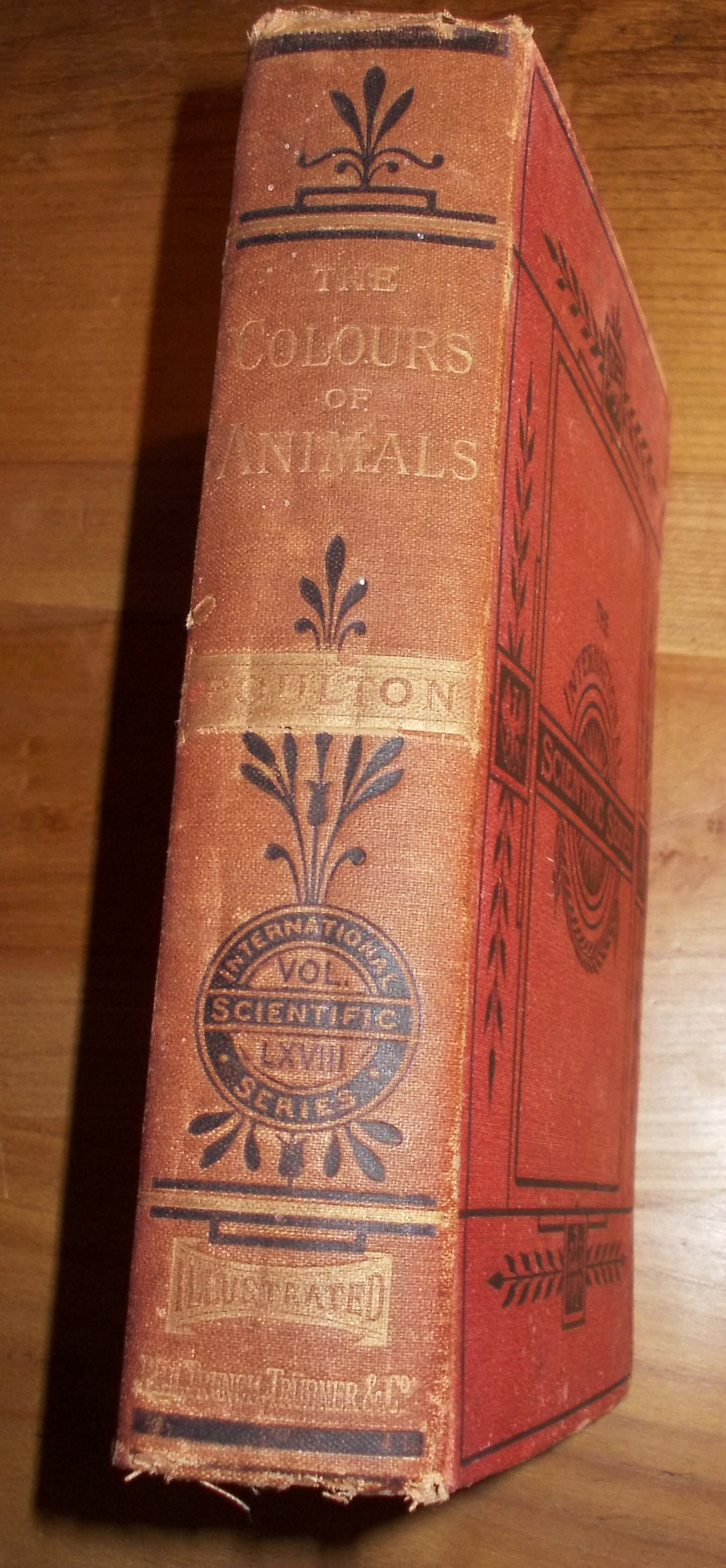
- Cover of first edition
- Author: Edward Bagnall Poulton
- Subject: Camouflage, Mimicry, Sexual selection
- Genre: Natural history
- Publisher: Kegan Paul, Trench & Trübner
- Publication date: 1890
- Publication place: United Kingdom
- Pages: 360

The Colours of Animals is a zoology book written in 1890 by Sir Edward Bagnall Poulton (1856–1943). It was the first substantial textbook to argue the case for Darwinian selection applying to all aspects of animal coloration. The book also pioneered the concept of frequency-dependent selection and introduced the term "aposematism".

The book begins with a brief account of the physical causes of animal coloration. The second chapter gives an overview of the book, describing the various uses of colour in terms of the advantages it can bring through natural selection. The next seven chapters describe camouflage, both in predators and in prey. Methods of camouflage covered include background matching, resemblance to specific objects such as bird droppings, self-decoration with materials from the environment, and the seasonal colour change of arctic animals. Two chapters cover warning colours, including both Batesian mimicry, where the mimic is edible, and Müllerian mimicry, where distasteful species mimic each other. A chapter then looks at how animals combine multiple methods of defence, for instance in the puss moth. Two chapters examine coloration related to sexual selection. Finally Poulton summarizes the subject with a fold-out table including a set of Greek derived words that he invented, of which "aposematic" and "cryptic" survive in biological usage.

The Colours of Animals was well received on its publication, although the book's support for sexual selection was criticised by Alfred Russel Wallace, and its Darwinism and critique of Lamarckism were attacked by Edward Drinker Cope. Wallace liked Poulton's experimental work but was critical of his opinions on sexual selection. The Neo-Lamarckian Cope criticised Poulton's support for Darwin but liked the book's many observations of animal coloration. Modern biologists respect Poulton's advocacy of natural selection and sexual selection, despite the lack at the time of an adequate theory of heredity, and his recognition of frequency-dependent selection.

== Book ==
=== Approach ===
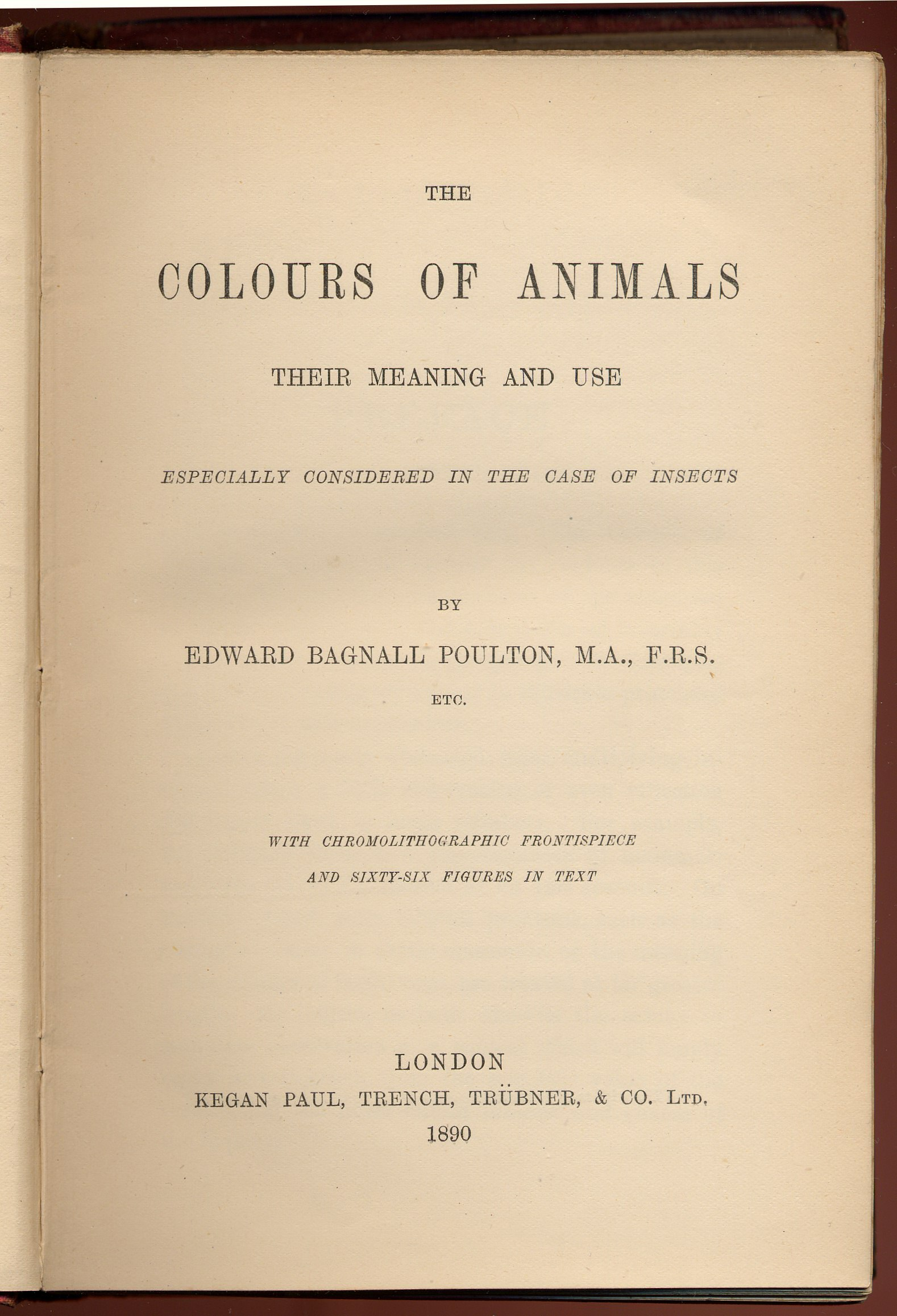
Title page of first edition of The Colours of Animals, 1890

Evidence for natural selection

Poulton explains in his Preface that

My chief object has been to demonstrate the utility of colour and marking in animals. In many cases I have attempted to prove that Natural Selection has sufficed to account for the results achieved; and I fully believe that further knowledge will prove that this principle explains the origin of all appearances except those which are due to the subordinate principle of Sexual Selection...

— E.B. Poulton (Note: Poulton, 1890. p viii.)

Evidence for sexual selection

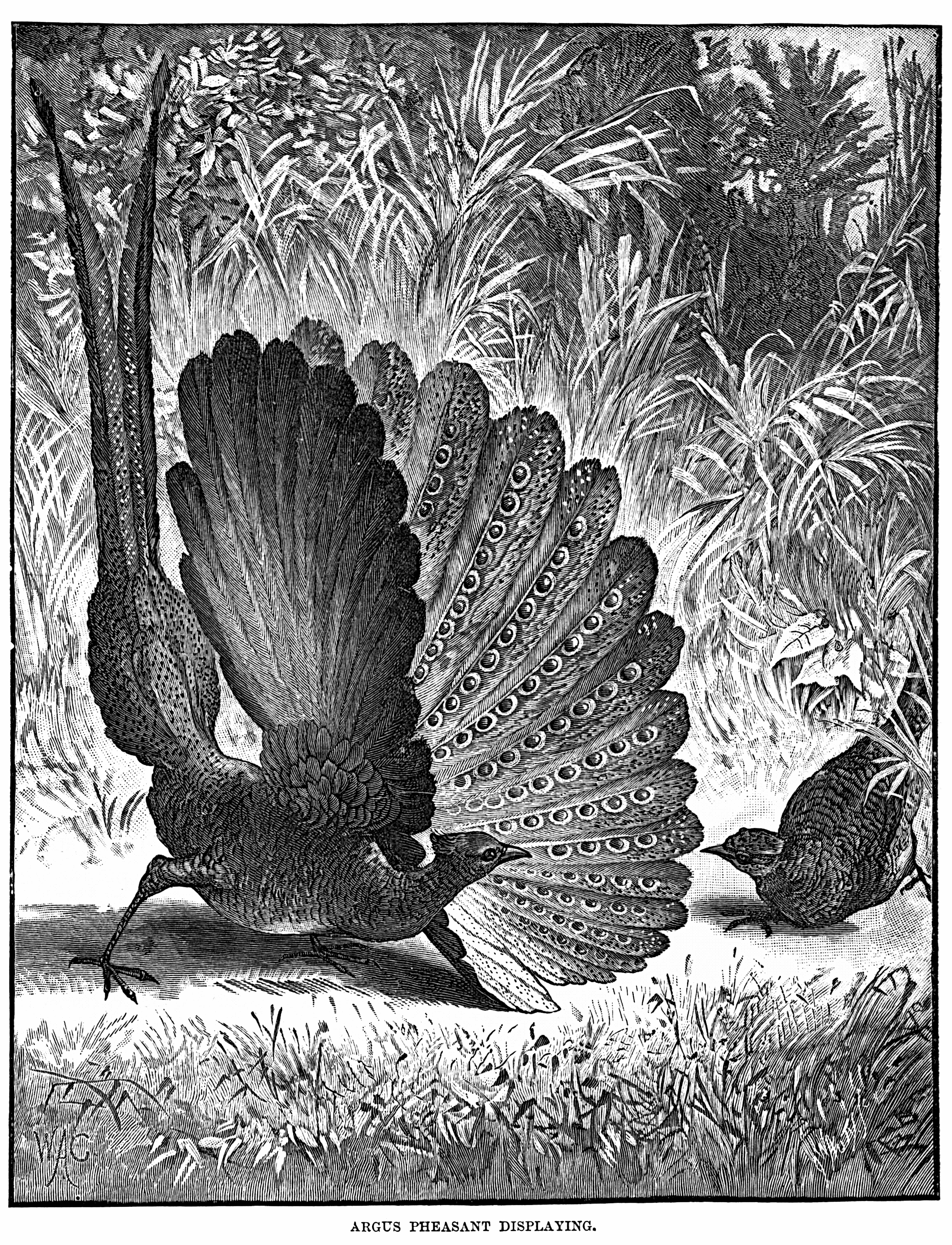
Male argus pheasant (Argusianus argus) displaying to a female, from Richard Lydekker's Royal Natural History, 1895

Poulton strongly supports Darwin both on the general theme of natural selection, and on the power of sexual selection in species which are sexually dimorphic (where, usually, the male is showier than the female):

When we look at the marvellous eyes upon the train of a Peacock, or the more beautiful markings on the feathers of the male Argus Pheasant, it seems impossible that so wonderful and complete a result can have been produced by the aesthetic preferences of female birds. And yet Mr. Darwin shows the relation between these characters and much simpler markings on other parts of the surface. He proves that the one has been derived from the other by gradual modification... Such facts, while eminently suggestive of ... some selective agency, seem to be unexplained by any other theory.

— E.B. Poulton (Note: Poulton, 1890. pp 334–335.)

Poulton knew his view was controversial, but believed he was winning the argument: (Note: Poulton, 1890. p 286.)

Mr. Wallace's chief objection is the lack of evidence that the female has any aesthetic preferences at all in the selection of her mate. When, however, he admits that display of their decorative plumage by male birds is 'demonstrated', and that the females are in all probability 'pleased or excited by the display', he certainly admits the possession of an aesthetic sense...

— E.B. Poulton

Frequency-dependent selection

In The Colours of Animals, Poulton introduced the concept of frequency-dependent selection (selection based on how abundant a form is) in the context of a polymorphism which he argued would otherwise soon vanish: (Note: Poulton, 1890. pp 46–47.)

If we breed from moths developed from the green larvae of, e.g., the Large Emerald, the larvae in the next generation are chiefly green, and after several generations there is little doubt that the brown form would become excessively rare; so also the green form would disappear if we bred from the brown varieties. But in nature both forms are common, and therefore it is certain that both must be advantageous to the species, or one of them would quickly disappear. I believe that it is a benefit to the species that some of its larvae should resemble brown and others green catkins, instead of all of them resembling either brown or green. In the former case the foes have a wider range of objects for which they may mistake the larvae, and the search must occupy more time, for equivalent results, than in the case of other species which are not dimorphic.

— E.B. Poulton

Mimicry and aposematism

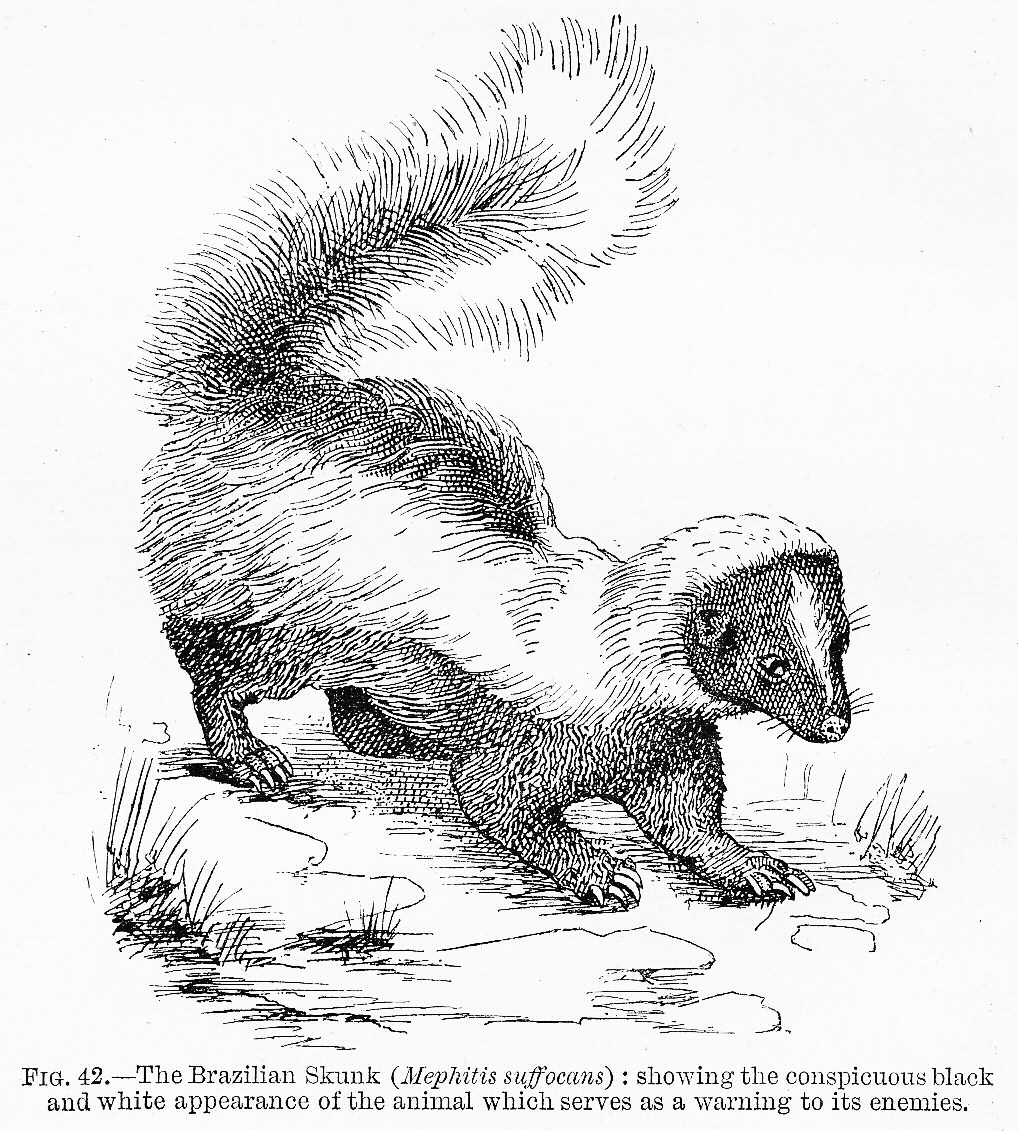
Warning coloration of the "Brazilian Skunk" in The Colours of Animals (Note: Poulton, 1890. p 162.)

The basic concept of warning coloration (aposematism, like the black and yellow pattern of a wasp) is approached very simply:

When an animal possesses an unpleasant attribute, it is often to its advantage to advertise the fact as publicly as possible. In this way it escapes a great deal of experimental 'tasting.' The conspicuous patterns and strongly contrasted colours which serve as the signal of danger or inedibility are known as Warning Colours.

— E.B. Poulton (Note: Poulton, 1890. p21.)

In the next paragraph Poulton ties aposematism to mimicry as follows:

It is these Warning Colours which are nearly always the objects of Protective Mimicry, and it will therefore be convenient to describe the former before the latter.

— E.B. Poulton

Poulton introduced the term aposematism with the words:

The second head (Sematic Colours) includes Warning Colours and Recognition Markings: the former warn an enemy off, and are therefore called Aposematic;

— E.B. Poulton (Note: Poulton, 1890. pp 337–338.)

=== Contents ===
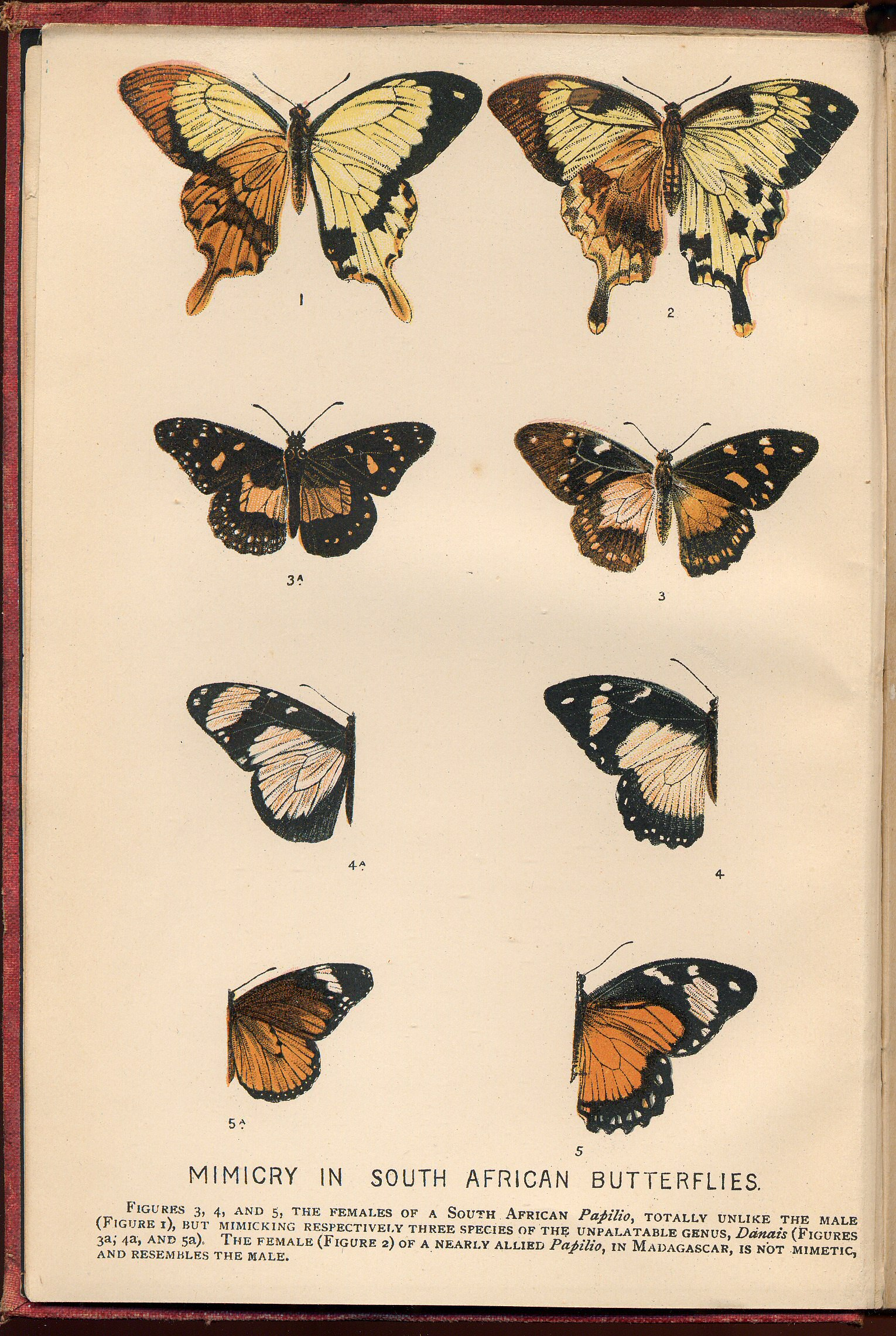
Frontispiece: Mimicry in South African Butterflies, the only chromolithograph in the book

The book's structure emphasises the extent to which Poulton, like Darwin, relied on a mass of evidence, mainly from insects, to make his case:

Chapter 1 The Physical Cause of Animal Colours.

Poulton introduces absorption, scattering, colour due to "thin plates" (structural coloration), diffraction and refraction.

Chapter 2 The Uses of Colour.

The effects of natural selection in creating or destroying colour are discussed. Colour can be non-significant, e.g. directly useful for absorbing heat, Poulton argues, but "By far the most widespread use of colour is to assist an animal in escaping from its enemies or in capturing its prey; the former is Protective, the latter Aggressive [resemblance, i.e. camouflage]." (Note: Poulton, 1890. p 19) The topics of mimicry, warning coloration, and sexual selection are introduced.

Chapter 3 Protective Resemblances in Lepidoptera.

Poulton distinguishes "special" from "general" resemblances, meaning mimicking a specific object "of no interest to its enemies", or just harmonising "with the general artistic effect of its surroundings", giving examples from moth caterpillars found in England such as the peppered moth and the brimstone moth.

Chapter 4 Protective Resemblances in Lepidoptera (continued), Dimorphism, Etc.

The privet hawkmoth caterpillar is used as an example of "general resemblance". Dimorphism, where caterpillars of a species are sometimes green, sometimes brown, is discussed. The delicacy of larvae is given as a reason for their "wonderful concealment": one touch from a predator "being practically fatal". The resemblance of Kallima and some moths to dead leaves is examined.

Chapter 5 Protective Resemblances In Vertebrata, Etc.

The camouflage of snakes, female birds that "undertake the duty of incubation", birds' eggs, mammals, fish, and marine molluscs is briefly covered.

Chapter 6 Aggressive Resemblances — Adventitious Protection.

The camouflage of predators including lizards, angler fish, mantises including Hymenopus bicornis and the bird-dropping spider is described. "Adventitious protection", making use of materials from the environment, is illustrated with examples such as the decorator crabs and caddis fly larvae, which build tubes "of grains of sand, small shells (often alive), vegetable fragments". (Note: Poulton, 1890. p 77)

Chapter 7 Variable Protective Resemblance in Vertebrata, Etc.

The ability of animals including fish, lizards and frogs to change their colours quickly is discussed. The changing of the pelage of arctic animals is attributed to the indirect effect of the change in temperature, i.e. a physiological response not a simple physical effect.

Chapter 8 Variable Protective Resemblance In Insects.

Poulton describes in detail experiments demonstrating that moth pupae take on the colour of the background experienced earlier by the larvae. He conducted experiments in Aglais urticae, finding that pupae took the colour of the surroundings, and demonstrating extra-ocular light and color perception.

Chapter 9 Protective Resemblances in Lepidoptera (continued).

Poulton discusses the metallic appearance of insect pupae, which he says is the reason for the name "chrysalis". (Note: From the Greek for 'gold'.) He rejects the (Lamarckian) view of the "origin of colour, by the direct influence of environment accumulated through many generations", which he agrees is "a very tempting conclusion", because of "clear evidence that the medium of the nervous system was necessary. (Note: Poulton, 1890. p 155)

Chapter 10 Warning Colours.

The conspicuous warning colours of many insects, skunks, snakes and salamanders are discussed. "It must have been obvious to any one interested in natural history that the insects met with during a walk in summer may be arranged in two great groups: ... difficult to find ... and ... startling colours and conspicuous attitudes" (Note: Poulton, 1890. p 159) The association of warning with "nauseous or dangerous" animals is identified. The idea that warning coloured animals must be scarce relative to palatable ones is mentioned, along with the reason why different animals use the same warning colours.

Chapter 11 Warning Colours (continued).

Poulton discusses the relationship of colours used for sexual selection and for warning, and continues the discussion of warning with many examples, including Müllerian mimicry, noting that this can both make a pair of distasteful species converge in appearance, and make a group of such species all resemble each other.

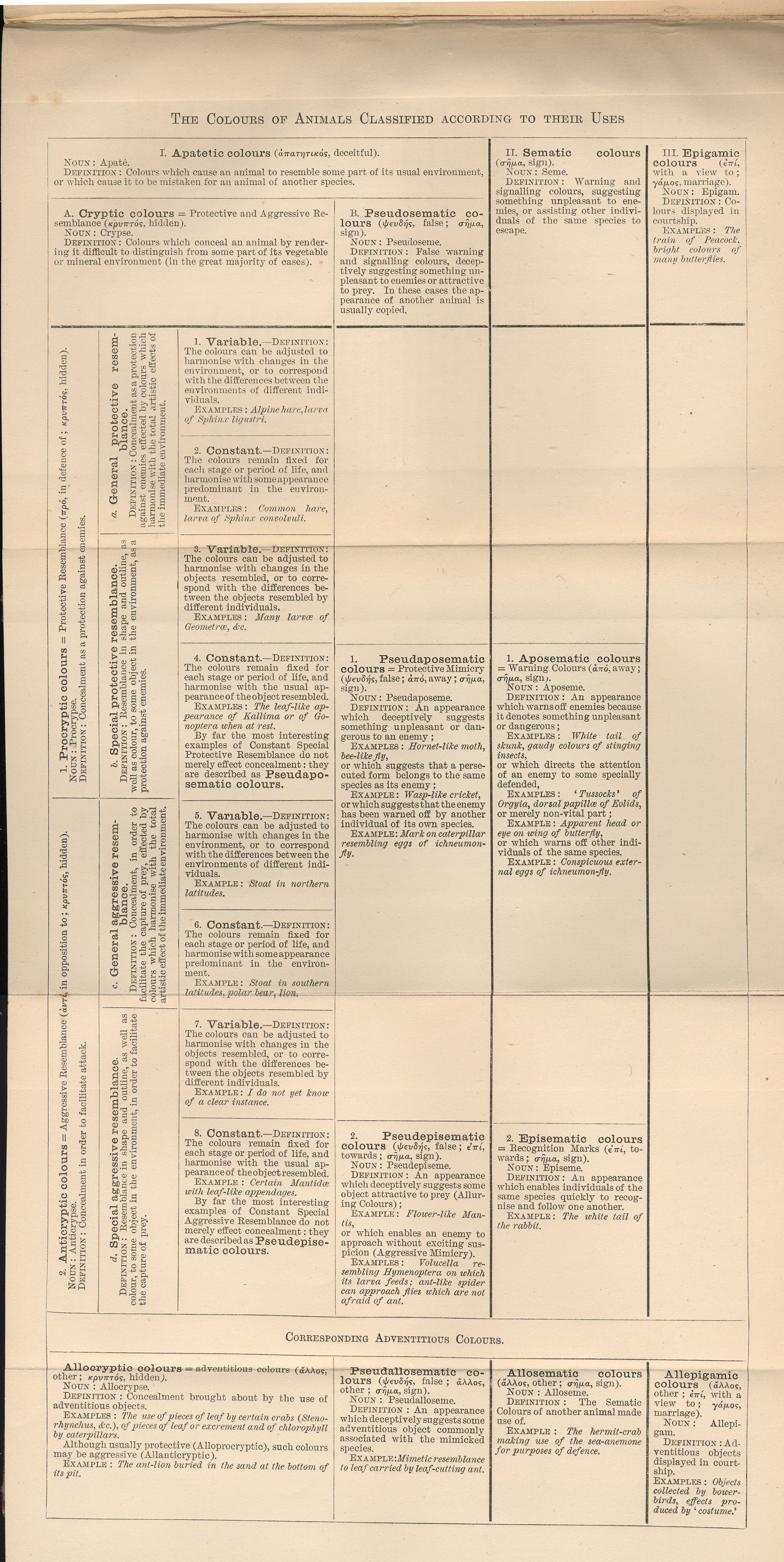
Chapter 17's summary table: "The Colours of Animals Classified According to Their Uses"

Chapter 12 Protective Mimicry.

The chapter looks at Batesian mimicry (where the mimic is edible) in both tropical butterflies and English moths, beginning "We now approach one of the most interesting aspects of our subject".

Chapter 13 Protective and Aggressive Mimicry.

Poulton gives examples of mimicry in other insect groups, remarking the "very imperfect" resemblance of bee hawk-moths to bees, which totally failed to "impose on" a lizard, but noting that the much more convincing mimicry of the hornet clearwing moth was treated with extreme caution by an inexperienced lizard.

Chapter 14 The Combination of Many Methods of Defence.

The chapter describes animals including the puss moth caterpillar which combines a threatening display with camouflage and the ability to eject an irritant fluid for protection. Poulton also discusses the lobster moth caterpillar.

Chapter 15 Colours Produced by Courtship.

Poulton discusses sexual selection in birds, butterflies and moths, and spiders, which he treats as another process alongside but supordinate to natural selection, with arguments against the views of Alfred Russel Wallace. He notes that it was remarkable that biological research since Darwin had focussed mainly on comparative anatomy and embryology, whereas Darwin himself was interested in "questions which concern the living animal as a whole", and observes that there are "comparatively few true naturalists", as opposed to "anatomists, microscopists, systematists, or collectors". (Note: Poulton, 1890. pp 286–287)

Chapter 16 Other Theories of Sexual Colouring.

In this chapter, Poulton looks at "the causes which Mr. Wallace and other writers believe to have been efficient in producing sexual colouring", such as the principle of "recognition marking". Poulton uses the example of the satin bowerbird as evidence for an aesthetic sense.

Chapter 17 Summary And Classification.

Poulton sums up his views with a fold-out table of "The Colours of Animals Classified According to Their Uses". His category names derived from Greek include the now widely used 'aposematic' and 'cryptic'.

== Reception ==
=== On first publication in 1890 ===
==== Wallace in Nature ====
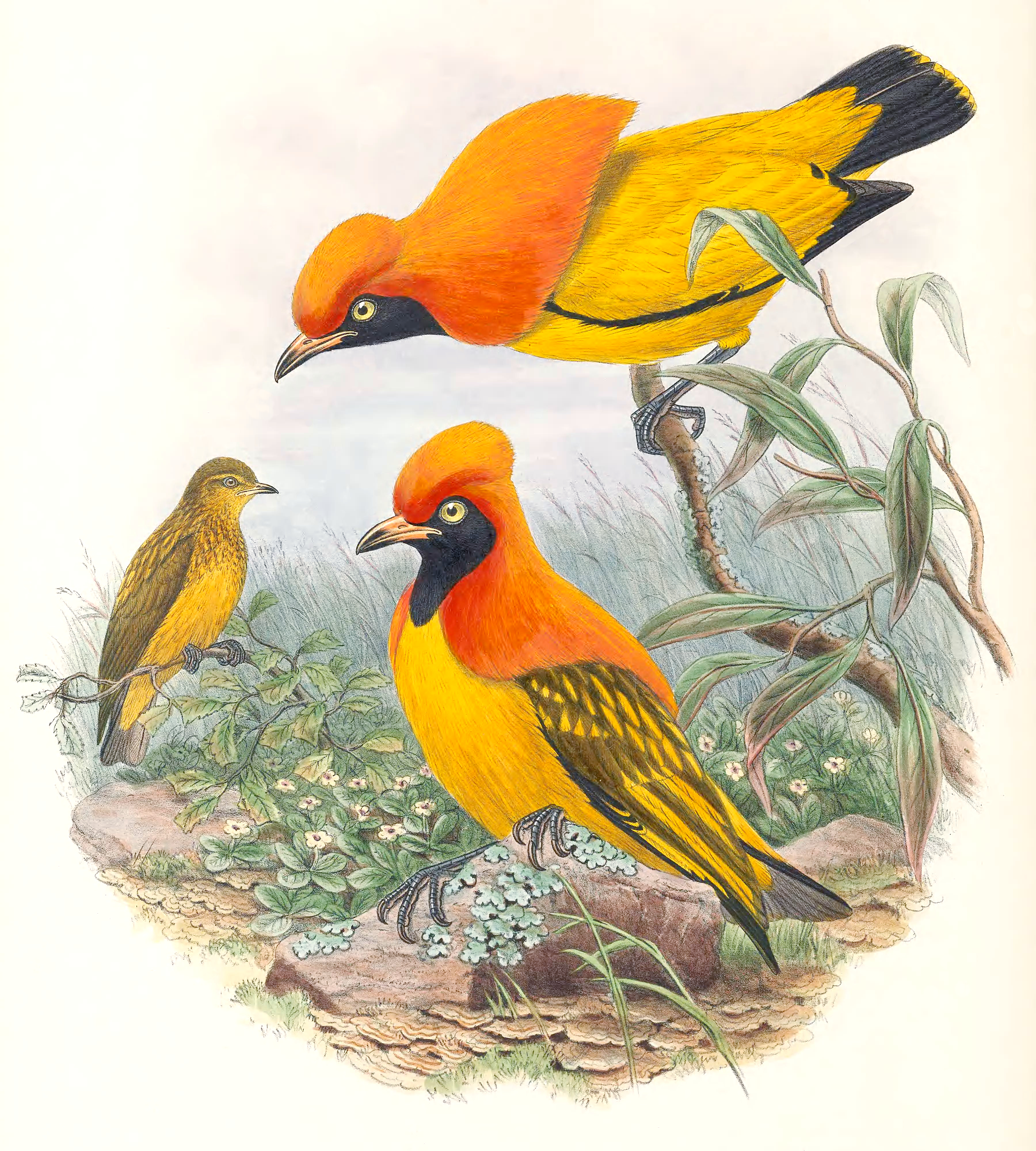
An aesthetic sense? Two males displaying to a female masked bowerbird, Sericulus aureus, illustrated by John Gould (1804–1881)

The co-discoverer of natural selection Alfred Russel Wallace, reviewing Poulton in Nature, was interested by Poulton's observations on thin films producing iridescence: "In some cases dried insects lose some of their metallic colours, but these reappear when the specimen is dipped in water." However, Wallace objected to Poulton's suggestion that arctic birds and mammals are white to reduce heat loss by radiation, for which he argued there was no evidence in favour, while a thicker "covering, such as actually occurs in all arctic animals" would reduce heat loss effectively, and could be observed to do so.

Wallace was enthusiastic about Poulton's experimental work on how butterfly larvae vary their coloration according to the background, admiring "a number of ingenious experiments" in which Poulton illuminated the insects in light of one colour or another, causing reliable colour changes which could not be direct, like photography, but had to be mediated by the animal's nervous system:

In some cases even the cocoons spun by the larvæ are modified by the surrounding colours; and still more curious changes are effected in the larva itself when ... the same species feeds on several plants having differently-coloured leaves. Even the presence of numerous dark twigs has been shown to cause a corresponding change of colour in the larva of the peppered moth (Amphidasis betularia)."

Wallace's main criticism, occupying half his lengthy review, was of Poulton's acceptance of sexual selection. He begins by stating "Mr. Poulton fully accepts Darwin's theory of female choice as the source of the greater part of the brilliant colour, delicate patterns, and ornamental appendages that exist among animals, and especially among birds and insects." Wallace then cites Poulton on the courtship behaviour of spiders:

"'The female always watches the antics of the male intently, but often refuses him in the end, 'even after dancing before her for a long time.' Such observations strongly point towards the existence of female preference based on æsthetic considerations'"

at once objecting "To the last four words we demur, as being altogether unproved. Why æsthetic considerations?" Wallace then spends a whole page attacking Poulton on "the possession of an 'æsthetic sense' by those creatures in which sexual ornament occurs". Wallace objects that Poulton asserts the reality of sexual selection with no proof other than mentioning that insects can perceive colour, and that "a few birds collect bright objects, as in the case of the bower-birds".

Wallace gives a detailed counter-example to refute Poulton's argument, arguing that "really beautiful combinations of colour and marking" are found on the sea shells of molluscs "where sexual selection has certainly not come into play". To make the point, Wallace lists

"the cones, cowries, olives, harps, volutes, pectens, and innumerable other molluscan shells; while many of the sea-anemones, and considerable numbers of the caterpillars with warning colours, are equally beautiful."

And that was not all. Wallace continued:

"Still more doubtful and more opposed to reasonable probability is the statement that 'our standards of beauty are largely derived from the contemplation of the numerous examples around us, which... have been created by the æsthetic preferences of the insect world'--alluding... to the colours and structures of flowers as being due to the need of attracting insects to fertilize them."

There was, Wallace insisted, "not a particle of evidence" of aesthetic preferences in "an insect's very limited mentality". The mention of the term aesthetic was "not scientific".

After so many "preceding remarks" against "the theory of sexual selection", Wallace concludes that "The book is well illustrated by numerous excellent woodcuts and a coloured plate", congratulates Poulton on "having produced so readable and suggestive a volume", and on having "contributed so largely" by "his own researches" into animal coloration.

==== New York Times ====
An anonymous reviewer in the New York Times wrote that "Mr Poulton wishes first of all to put himself right with regard to his attitude to Darwinism", mentioning that in 1888 he had been cited in the Edinburgh Review as attacking Darwinism. The reviewer hastens to agree that Poulton is in fact "ready to combat Wallace, his master, on points wherein that great fellow-laborer with Charles Darwin dissents from the latter's views."

As an example of this, the reviewer mentions Poulton's argument that Wallace must be wrong that "the coloring whereby the sexes often differ one from the other in a startling way is occasioned by a surplus vitality" because "sexual colors are only developed in species which court by day or twilight" and then only on parts of the body which the female "would oftenest and best see them".

The New York Times reviewer argued that the title should have been less general "for readers are sure to demand too much from so comprehensive a term", given that Poulton refers mainly to insects rather than "wild beasts", but in the end he agreed "that Mr. Poulton has written a very suggestive treatise, well fitted for the general reader".

==== E.D. Cope in American Naturalist ====
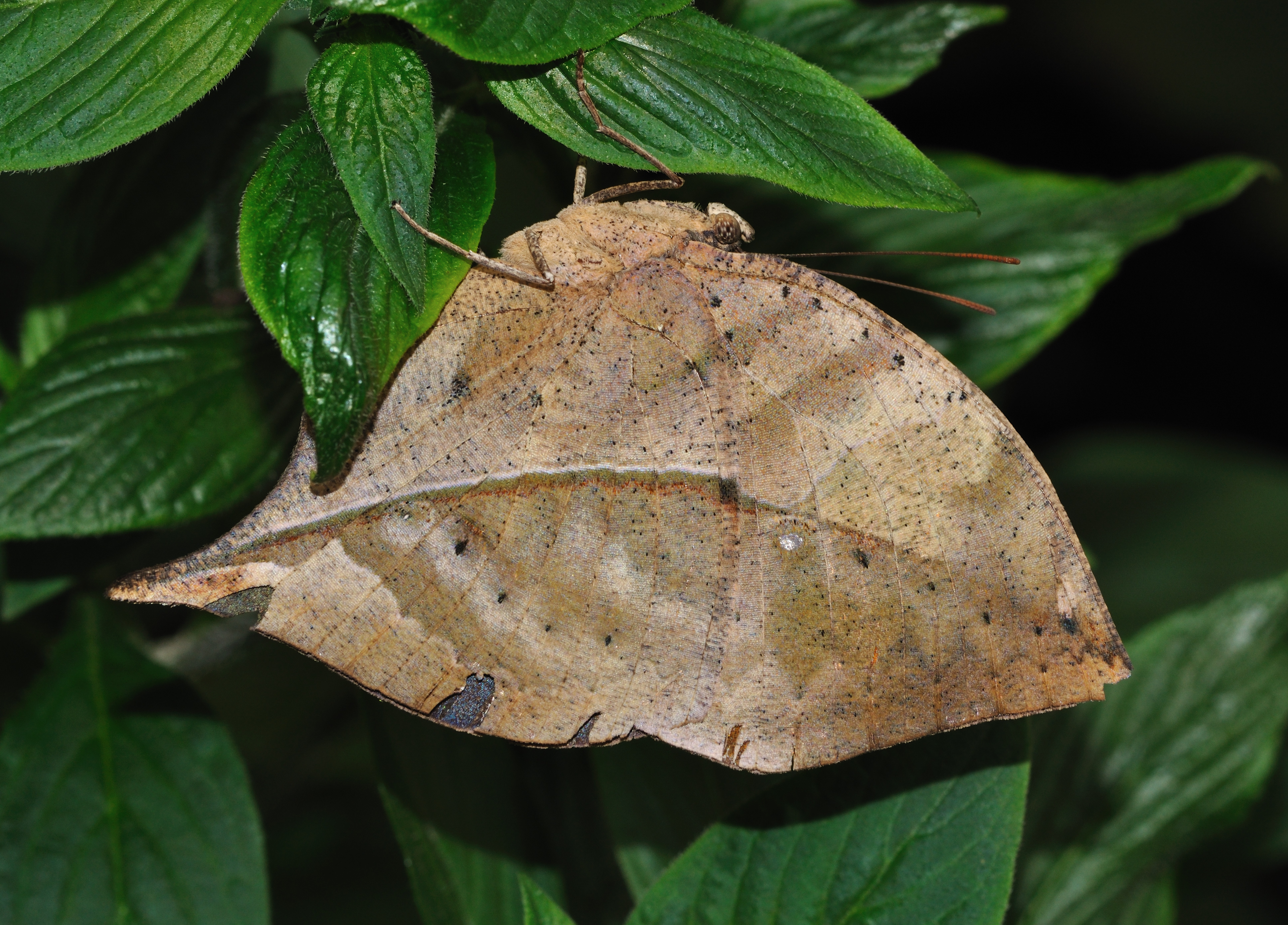
"Most perfect concealment": Kallima inachus, the "dead leaf" butterfly

The Neo-Lamarckian Edward Drinker Cope, reviewing the book for the American Naturalist, wrote that "Mr. Poulton supports his own theory of the direct physiological value of the uses of colour to animals by a large amount of experimental evidence brought together from many sources". Cope is attracted by "a detail of great interest" in a caterpillar's camouflage "by the semblance of a small hole to indicate piercing by insect larvae" (ichneumon flies, since they avoid caterpillars that are already parasitised), and is impressed by Poulton's observations of "perhaps the most perfect concealment attained by any butterfly" in the dead leaf butterfly Kallima, first described by Alfred Russel Wallace.

While admiring of Poulton's detailed observations, Cope was critical of his support for Darwin, arguing that Poulton failed to explain how the variability that natural selection needs to work on actually arises. (The mechanisms of mutation and genetics were not to become adequately understood until the twentieth century rediscovery of Mendel's work.)

Cope also objected to Poulton's critique of Lamarckism, where in a footnote he cites S.B.J. Skertchly (Note: Sydney Barber Josiah Skertchly (1850–1927), author with Alfred Tylor of Colouration in Animals and Plants, Alabaster, Passmore and sons, 1886, and member of the Royal Society of Queensland.) as writing that "other butterflies noticed this immunity [and] copied it, (Note: Poulton, 1890. pp 224–225.) to which Cope replies as that "even the American Neo-Lamarckians [like Cope] do not follow their founder so far as to believe that the volition of an animal could account for all the details of mimetic resemblance."

==== Science journal ====
Science reviewed the book in November 1890. The reviewer remarks that "It is impossible in this brief notice to do full justice to the wealth of interesting examples with which the author presents us", and notes that unlike the "hackneyed" examples of mimicry and camouflage in other textbooks, "Many of the observations are original." The reviewer remarks, also, on the "decided antithesis between warning and protective colors", animals being either "as conspicuous as possible", or as cryptic as possible, while the conspicuous ones "are usually accompanied by a nauseating taste, strongly smelling or irritant fluids, etc."

The reviewer notes more critically that additional examples of mimicry might have been given, such as of Hymenoptera (bees and wasps) mimicked by Diptera (flies), and would have liked fuller treatment of Bates's "South American heliconids and pierids". The reviewer finds the closing chapters on "colors used in courtship" the most interesting of the book, since zoologists disagreed widely on the subject, and notes that Poulton sided with Darwin and against Wallace "who denies that the so-called secondary sexual characters" can "owe their origin to sexual selection". The reviewer, siding with Poulton, writes that "It would be difficult, we believe, to explain many of the facts cited by Poulton, notably Peckham's observations on the courtship of spiders, from Wallace's standpoint." The review ends with a brief discussion of Poulton's table classifying animal coloration, predicting (correctly) that the "Greek derivatives" such as pseudaposematic and pseudepisematic will not be generally adopted.

==== British Medical Journal ====
The British Medical Journal reviewed the book in July 1890. The review begins by noting that the pre-Darwinian view of colour "to-day appears almost ridiculous", adding that "we now know" that colour is of benefit to the animal, and is subject to natural selection. The reviewer writes that it is among Lepidoptera (butterflies and moths) that "protective resemblance or 'cryptic coloration' is most beautifully illustrated, and the book teems with instances" of these, noting that Poulton had "made this part of the subject his own". The review quotes examples including the twig larvae of the Brimstone moth and the "terrifying attitude" of the Puss moth caterpillar.

The reviewer, noting Wallace's different opinion, has no difficulty with Poulton's view of sexual selection, that it is "due to an aesthetic sense in the [female] animals", and likes Poulton's expression that "Natural Selection is a qualifying examination which must be passed by all candidates for honours; Sexual Selection is an honours examination in which many who have passed the previous examination will be rejected." The review objects to the "thick type headings to the subdivision of chapters" which it finds too much like "the 'new journalism'". It concludes by urging readers to compare the book with Darwin's Descent of Man and with Wallace's Darwinism.

=== Modern view ===
Poulton was a staunch supporter of Darwin, through a period when there was no adequate theory of heredity and both natural selection and sexual selection had become unpopular among scientists, and was attacked for his support both in The Colours of Animals and outside it. And he is recognised as the first scientist to identify frequency-dependent selection, as described in this book. By 1919, the book was being described in Nature as a classic work.

Poulton is paid homage by J.A. Allen and B.C. Clarke for his pioneering work on frequency-dependent selection "by predators acting on non-mimetic polymorphic prey (i.e. for apostatic selection), anticipating many of the points made by later workers. We draw attention to his remarkable insight."

The Oxford Dictionary of National Biography comments that Poulton's book "concisely and simply explained the many forms of coloration in terms of natural selection; these forms he ingeniously summarized in a comparative table introducing terms which became the standard nomenclature."

In her book The Ant and the Peacock: Altruism and Sexual Selection from Darwin to Today, the Darwinian philosopher and rationalist Helena Cronin writes that in The Colours of Animals, Poulton defended Darwin's theory of sexual selection, stressing the role of female choice. She suggests that while people have therefore taken Poulton for a staunch Darwinist and supporter of sexual selection, he "lost his initial enthusiasm for the theory" and "came to relegate it to a very minor position" in evolution. She writes that Poulton's position was highly influential, stating that later "Darwinian experts on coloration" followed his views, citing Frank Evers Beddard's 1892 Animal Coloration as evidence.

In his Introduction to Hugh Bamford Cott's 1940 book Adaptive Coloration in Animals, Julian Huxley praised Cott's work as "a worthy successor to Sir Edward Poulton's The Colours of Animals... The one was a pioneer study, the other is in many respects the last word on the subject".

== See also ==
- Animal Coloration (F.E. Beddard, 1892)
- Concealing-Coloration in the Animal Kingdom (G.H. Thayer, 1909)
- Adaptive Coloration in Animals (Hugh Cott, 1940)

== Bibliography ==
- Poulton, Edward Bagnall, Sir (1890). The Colours of Animals, their meaning and use, especially considered in the case of insects . London : Kegan Paul, Trench & Trübner.
