= Haplochromis brownae =

Conservation status
- Critically endangered, possibly extinct (IUCN 3.1)

Scientific classification
- Kingdom: Animalia
- Phylum: Chordata
- Class: Actinopterygii
- Order: Cichliformes
- Family: Cichlidae
- Genus: Haplochromis
- Species: H. brownae

Binomial name
- Haplochromis brownae Greenwood, 1962

Synonyms
- Astatotilapia brownae (Greenwood, 1962)

Species of fish

Haplochromis brownae is a species of cichlid endemic to Lake Victoria though it may be extinct in the wild. This species can reach a length of 10.4 centimetres (4.1 in) SL. The identity of the person honoured by this species' specific name is not known but it is thought most likely to be Margaret "Peggy" Brown (1918-2009) who was a visiting scientist with the East African Freshwater Fisheries Research Organization at Jinja, Uganda in 1950 or 1951, where Humphry Greenwood was working.
