= Adaptive Coloration in Animals =

1940 textbook on camouflage, mimicry and aposematism by Hugh Cott

- Cover of first edition
- Author: Hugh Bamford Cott; Introduction by Julian Huxley
- Illustrator: Hugh Bamford Cott
- Subject: Camouflage, Mimicry, Warning coloration
- Genre: Natural history
- Publisher: Methuen, Oxford University Press
- Publication date: 1940
- Publication place: United Kingdom
- Pages: 508
- OCLC: 974070031

Adaptive Coloration in Animals is a 500-page textbook about camouflage, warning coloration and mimicry by the Cambridge zoologist Hugh Cott, first published during the Second World War in 1940; the book sold widely and made him famous.

The book's general method is to present a wide range of examples from across the animal kingdom of each type of coloration, including marine invertebrates and fishes as well as terrestrial insects, amphibians, reptiles, birds and mammals. The examples are supported by many of Cott's own drawings, diagrams, and photographs. This essentially descriptive natural history treatment is supplemented with accounts of experiments by Cott and others. The book had few precedents, but to some extent follows (and criticises) Abbott Handerson Thayer's 1909 Concealing-Coloration in the Animal Kingdom.

The book is divided into three parts: concealment, advertisement, and disguise. Part 1, concealment, covers the methods of camouflage, which are colour resemblance, countershading, disruptive coloration, and shadow elimination. The effectiveness of these, arguments for and against them, and experimental evidence, are described. Part 2, advertisement, covers the methods of becoming conspicuous, especially for warning displays in aposematic animals. Examples are chosen from mammals, insects, reptiles and marine animals, and empirical evidence from feeding experiments with toads is presented. Part 3, disguise, covers methods of mimicry that provide camouflage, as when animals resemble leaves or twigs, and markings and displays that help to deflect attack or to deceive predators with deimatic displays. Both Batesian mimicry and Müllerian mimicry are treated as adaptive resemblance, much like camouflage, while a chapter is devoted to the mimicry and behaviour of the cuckoo. The concluding chapter admits that the book's force is cumulative, consisting of many small steps of reasoning, and being a wartime book, compares animals to military camouflage.

Cott's textbook was at once well received, being admired both by zoologists and naturalists and among allied soldiers. Many officers carried a copy of the book with them in the field. Since the war it has formed the basis for experimental investigation of camouflage, while its breadth of coverage and accuracy have ensured that it remains frequently cited in scientific papers.

== The book ==
=== Approach ===
Adaptive Coloration in Animals is a 500-page book, 10 by 7 inches (250 by 180 mm) in its first edition. It was published by Methuen (in London) and Oxford University Press (in New York) in 1940. It is full of detailed observations of types of camouflage and other uses of colour in animals, and illustrated by the author with clear drawings and photographs. There is a coloured frontispiece showing eight of Cott's paintings of tropical amphibians. The book has 48 monotone plates and several illustrations. (Note: Cott, 1940. Title page.)

Cott's method is to provide a large number of examples, illustrated with his own drawings or photographs, showing animals from different groups including fish, reptiles, birds and insects, especially butterflies. The examples are chosen to illustrate specific adaptations. For example, the fish Chaetodon capistratus is described as follows: (Note: Cott, 1940. pp. 372-373.)

this species had the habit of swimming very slowly tail first: but when disturbed it darts rapidly off to safety in the opposite direction... C. capistratus adopts the same tactics... [This fish] is of particular interest in that the real eye is obliterated and a false eye substituted in one and the same animal.

— Hugh Cott

Cott was well aware that he was publishing in wartime. There are, as Julian Huxley remarks in his 'Introduction', references throughout the book to the human analogues of animal camouflage and concealment. For example, in the section on 'Adaptive Silence', the kestrel is said to "practise dive-bombing attacks", or "after the fashion of a fighter 'plane" to fly down other birds, while "Owls have solved the problem of the silent air-raid"; Cott spends the rest of that paragraph on the "method which has recently been rediscovered and put into practice" of shutting off a bomber's engines and "gliding noiselessly down towards their victims" at Barcelona in the Spanish Civil War. (Note: Cott, 1940. p. 144.) In the concluding chapter, Cott explicitly states "The innumerable visible devices used ... in peacetime and in wartime ... are merely rediscovered ... applications of colour that have already reached a high ... degree of specialization and perfection.. in the animal world", mentioning predator-prey relationships, sexual selection and signalling to rivals. He then compares the "hunting disguises put on ... as a means of approaching, ambushing or alluring game, and the sniping suits, concealed machine-gun posts, and booby traps" with the camouflage of animal predators; and similarly he compares "protective disguises" with the "photographer's hide and the gunner's observation post." In the same section, Cott compares intentionally visible signs with animal warning colours: "The policeman's white gloves have their parallel in the white stripes or spots of nocturnal skunks and carabids. The Automobile Association has adopted a system of coloration [black and yellow] whose copyright belongs by priority to wasps and salamanders." (Note: Cott, 1940. p. 436.)

=== Structure ===
The book addresses its subject under three main headings: concealment, advertisement, and disguise.

==== Part I: Concealment ====
Cott's diagrammatic explanation of "the principle of maximum disruptive contrast, and showing the distractive effect upon the eye of patterns which contrast as violently as possible with the tone of their background"

The methods by which concealment is attained in nature

Cott sets out his view that we have to be re-taught how to see, mentioning Ruskin's "innocence of the eye". He argues that camouflage should, and in animals actually does, use four mechanisms: colour resemblance, obliterative shading (i.e. countershading, the graded shading which conceals self-shadowing of the lower body), disruptive coloration, and shadow elimination.

Chapter 1. General colour resemblance.

Cott gives many examples such as a table of 16 species of green tropical tree-snakes.

Chapter 2. Variable colour resemblance. Caterpillars and pupae (as in Poulton's famous experiment) are coloured to match their environment. Mountain hares change colour in winter; many fish, cephalopods, frogs, and crustacea can change colour rapidly.

Chapter 3. Obliterative shading.

Following the artist and amateur naturalist Abbott Handerson Thayer, Cott explains countershading with diagrams, photographs of models and examples of real animals. He shows how helpful it would be for military camouflage with drawings of gun barrels.

Chapter 4. Disruptive coloration.

Cott argues with diagrams, drawings, photographs and examples that animals are often extremely effectively disruptively patterned. He analyses the component effects of disruption, including "differential blending" and "maximum disruptive contrast". Cott's figure 7 is a set of nine drawings, arranged as a 3x3 table. On the left is an animal's outline in grey tone against a differently coloured background. In the centre, the same animals are now disruptively patterned against the same plain backgrounds. On the right, the disruptively patterned animals are shown against realistic broken backgrounds containing vegetation or rocks. Cott explains

The simplified diagrams in Fig. 7 illustrate the value and effectiveness of maximum disruptive contrasts better than any verbal description... On looking at these drawings from a little distance, it will be seen that the conspicuous patches operate most efficiently in distracting attention from the form of the animals wearing them. By sheer force of their brightness, or blackness, or contrasts, they dominate the picture presented to the eye, apparently destroying their form... (Note: Cott, 1940. p. 52.)

Cott goes on to explain that the right-hand drawing shows the effect "of broken surroundings in further blending and confusing the picture", observing that this is the closest to what is seen in nature. His readers are invited to look first at the right-hand images to gain an idea of the power of "these optical devices" as camouflage, putting off the moment when the animal is actually recognised. (Note: Cott, 1940. p. 53.)

Chapter 5. Coincident disruptive coloration.

Animals such as frogs are patterned so that when they are at rest with legs tucked in, their outline is powerfully disrupted with markings that seem to flow across body and leg boundaries. Eyes too are often hidden in stripes or eye masks.

Chapter 6. Concealment Of the shadow.

Cast shadows give away even well-camouflaged animals. Many animals therefore take care to minimise shadow, by lying down, with flattened bodies, or with fringes. Some hawkmoth caterpillars have false shadow patterns to suggest they are parts of other objects.

The function of concealing coloration in nature

Chapter 7. Concealment in defence, mainly as illustrated by birds.

Cott considers how effective camouflage is as an adaptation, such as in incubation and rest (sleep) in birds. For instance nightjars are nocturnal, and rest, well camouflaged, on the ground during the day.

Chapter 8. Concealment In offence.

Cott describes the care that predators take when approaching prey, minimizing visible movement and scent, the use of cover for ambush, and "adaptive silence".

Chapter 9. Objections and evidence bearing on the theory of concealing coloration.

In this chapter Cott discusses various objections to the adaptive (evolutionary) nature of camouflage, and provides evidence to dismiss them. Some are "based upon such obvious fallacies that they hardly deserve serious consideration."

Chapter 10. The effectiveness of concealing coloration.

Cott describes simple experiments such as that fish that have changed colour to match a pale background survived better (64% to 42%) on such a background than fish which had not. He also quotes some anecdotal observations on wild animals with similar but not quantified results.

==== Part II: Advertisement ====
The methods by which conspicuousness is attained in nature

Chapter 1. The appearance and behaviour of aposematic animals.

Animals that are genuinely distasteful (aposematic) boldly advertise themselves in black, white, red, and yellow. They are often "sluggish", not running from predators; gregarious; and diurnal, since warning displays only work if they can be seen "by potential enemies". (Note: Cott, 1940. p. 203.)

Chapter 2. Warning displays.

Aposematic animals often have (honest) threat displays; edible prey sometimes have (bluffing) startle displays. For example the frilled lizard, Chlamydosaurus kingii, is illustrated in a drawing by Cott, with its tail raised over the body, stretched up on all four legs, mouth wide open, and frills out both sides of the head, making it a startling sight.

Chapter 3. Adventitious warning coloration.

Some marine animals select aposematic materials as coverings, not only as camouflage. Some birds nest near wasps' nests.

Warning coloration in relation to prey

Chapter 4. The nature and function of warning coloration, as illustrated by the mammalia.

Prey like porcupines have warning colours, make noise, and attack predators (even leopards).

Chapter 5. The Protective Attributes Of Aposematic Animals In General.

Evidence is given that conspicuous animals such as caterpillars really are distasteful. Animals with actual poisons are discussed, and how these are secreted, used in bites and stings, or kept to make the animal bitter tasting.

Chapter 6. The relation between warning colours and distasteful attributes.

Various kinds of evidence are presented for aposematism.

Chapter 7. The effectiveness of protective attributes associated with warning colours.

Experimental evidence is presented that insects with warning colours are rejected by predators.

Warning coloration in reference to predatory enemies

Chapter 8. Experimental evidence that vertebrate enemies learn by experience.

Experiments by Cott show that toads learn to avoid eating stinging bees.

Chapter 9. Evidence of selective feeding by vertebrate enemies in a state of nature.

Evidence from wild birds and toads demonstrates preferences for particular prey.

==== Part III: Disguise ====
Cott's accurate drawing of the potoo, disruptively coloured and perched to resemble a broken branch

Special protective and aggressive resemblance

Chapter 1. Special resemblance to particular objects.

Cott describes leaf-like fish, chameleons, and insects, and other mimetic forms of camouflage. A liana-like snake near Para (a haunt of Henry Walter Bates in Naturalist on the River Amazons) 160 times as long as it was thick is called "a revelation in the art of aggressive resemblance".

Chapter 2. Adaptive behaviour in relation to special cryptic resemblance.

Animals keep still, sway in the wind, or play dead to assist their camouflage. Poulton's examples of twig-like Geometridae caterpillars are praised. There are fine photographs of leaf insects, and Cott's admired drawing of a poor-me-one or potoo, Nyctibius griseus, sitting on its nest mimicking a broken branch. Cott explains, in a section on "Special resemblances in relation to the attitude of rest"

This wonderful bird ... habitually selects the top of an upright stump as a receptacle for its egg, which usually occupies a small hollow just, and only just, large enough to contain it.... the stump selected had thrown up a new leader just below the point of fracture;... the bird sat facing this in such a way that when viewed from behind they came into line and blended with the grey stem. (Note: Cott, 1940. p. 352.)

Chapter 3. Adventitious Concealing Coloration.

Cott begins by citing Shakespeare's Macbeth with "until/ Great Birnamwood to the Dunsinane hill/ Shall come against him" to introduce his chapter on the use of materials as camouflage. Animals from crabs to caterpillars are described.

Cott's art in the service of zoology: the four-eye butterfly fish, Chaetodon capistratus, showing two adaptations at once: concealment of the eye, and distraction with an eyespot. Fig. 76 from Adaptive Coloration in Animals

Conspicuous localized characters

Chapter 4. Deflective marks.

Cott describes markings that help to deflect attack, such as the eyespots of butterfly wings and the twitching cast-off tails of lizards, both acknowledged to Poulton, (Note: Cott, 1940. pp. 368, 369.) as well as the distraction displays of birds such as the partridge mentioned by Gilbert White in his Natural History and Antiquities of Selborne. (Note: Cott, 1940. p. 371.)

Chapter 5. Directive marks.

A selection of lures and deceptive markings are described. A large drawing depicts the deimatic warning display of a mantis, Pseudocreobotra wahlbergi with its spined forelegs raised and large spiral eyespots on its spread wings forming an image "suggestive of a formidable foe". Other drawings depict the eyespots of fish such as Chaetodon capistratus, the four-eye butterfly fish, which are "usually towards the tail end" and tending to direct attack away from the head. (Note: Cott, 1940. p. 373.)

Alluring and mimetic resemblances

Chapter 6. Alluring coloration.

The bird-dropping spider Ornithoscatoides decipiens, the flower mantis Hymenopus bicornis and other camouflaged hunters are described.

Chapter 7. Mimicry: the attributes of mimics.

Cott follows Poulton in treating mimicry as basically the same as camouflage or "adaptive resemblance". Batesian mimicry and Mullerian mimicry are compared. The behaviour of "Esquimaux seal-hunters" and First World War Q-ships are mentioned.

Chapter 8. Breeding parasitism and mimicry in cuckoos.

The mimicry and behaviour of the European cuckoo, Cuculus canorus is analysed.

==== Conclusion ====
The final chapter confirms that "The force of the facts and arguments used in this work is cumulative in effect." Many small steps of reasoning combine to show that "adaptive coloration... has been... one of the main achievements of organic evolution." The book ends by comparing human artefacts and "natural adaptations", both of which can have goals (recall the publication date of 1940, early in the Second World War) including "the frustration of a predatory animal or of an aggressive Power".

== Reception ==
=== Foreword ===
Julian S. Huxley wrote a foreword (labelled 'Introduction') which defends the Darwinian concept of adaptation, especially of colour (in animals) and within that frame of mimicry. He makes it clear that "in these last thirty years" (that is, from about 1910 to 1940) he believed that "experimental biologists" professed, even if they did not actually hold, "a radical scepticism on the subject of adaptations", in other words about whether natural selection really could have created the enormous diversity of pattern and colour seen in nature. (Note: Cott, 1940. pp vii-ix.) Huxley quoted the now long-forgotten Aaron Franklin Shull's 1936 Evolution which stated "These special forms [sexual selection, warning colours, mimicry and signalling] of the selection idea... seem destined to be dropped, or at least relegated to very minor places in the Evolution discussion.", and more sharply that "aggressive and alluring resemblance" (Huxley's words) "must probably be set down as products of fancy belonging to uncritical times." Huxley's reply is simply

Dr. Cott, in this important book, has turned the tables with a vengeance on objectors of this type... Had they taken the trouble to acquaint themselves with even a fraction of the relevant facts to be found in nature, they could never have ventured to enunciate such sweeping criticisms: their objections are a measure of their ignorance.

— Julian Huxley

With objections dismissed, Huxley remarks that "Dr. Cott is a true follower of Darwin in driving his conclusions home by sheer weight of example," observing that "Faced with his long lists of demonstrative cases, the reader is tempted to wonder why adaptive theories of coloration have been singled out for attack by anti-selectionists." Huxley also noted Cott's "constant cross-reference to human affairs", and that it was good to know that Cott was applying his principles "to the practice of camouflage in war".

Huxley concluded his introduction by describing Adaptive Coloration as "in many respects the last word on the subject", upholding the great tradition of "scientific natural history".

=== Contemporary reviews (circa 1940) ===
Reviewers had little to compare Adaptive Coloration with. The English zoologist Edward Bagnall Poulton, a Darwinian, had written a 360-page book, The Colours of Animals, fifty years earlier in 1890, and he was able, at age 84, to review Cott's work in Nature on its appearance in 1940, beginning with the words

This excellent work, eagerly awaited for many years, will be most welcome to naturalists, even, we may hope, to the few who have hitherto rejected the Darwinian interpretation which the author has here supported by a mass of additional evidence based on his own observations and those of very many others.

— E.B. Poulton

The ichthyologist Carl Leavitt Hubbs, reviewing the book for American Naturalist in 1942, began

In this Neodarwinian epic Dr. Cott stamps himself as a true disciple of the master evolutionist. Indeed, he rivals Darwin in the thorough, objective and penetrating analysis of a major biological problem. An immense body of facts and interpretation, much of it original, has been judiciously considered and brought to bear on the question of the biological significance of coloration.

— Carl L. Hubbs

Hubbs notes that Cott is seeming concerned about the scarcity of experimental data for the survival value of camouflage, and accordingly relies on Sumner and Isely's "clear-cut results", but at once continues that Cott relies on "the general lore of natural history". Hubbs also remarks on the "resurgence to Darwinian views", referring to the scepticism about the power of natural selection among both geneticists of the time and to the Lamarckist views of Trofim Lysenko.

Hubbs observes that Cott is both an artist and a naturalist as well as a scientist: "In section after section, rivaling one another in fascination, this master of art and of natural history unfolds the biological significance of adaptive coloration in animals." And Cott's emphasis on disruptive patterning and (following Thayer) countershading clearly affected the reviewer: "Particularly impressive is the author's treatment of "coincident disruptive coloration", in which a ruptive mark crosses structural boundaries, so as to obliterate visually such ordinarily conspicuous parts as the eye and the limbs. Concealment of an animal's ordinarily telltale shadow is also stressed". Hubbs's review ends "This book is the work of an artist, and it is a work of art. Every biologist with an interest in any phase of natural history or evolution should keep it at hand."

"W.L.S.", reviewing Cott in The Geographical Journal in 1940, begins with "In this large and well-illustrated volume the author discusses at length reason or reasons for the various colour patterns found in the animal kingdom." The reviewer goes on "He has presented us with a vast number of facts and observations which are somewhat difficult to analyse." However "W.L.S." admits that disruptive coloration "is discussed at considerable length by Mr. Cott and many remarkable instances of it are considered in detail". The review ends by mentioning that while biologists (of the 1930s) usually "reject the influence of Natural Selection in evolution, the facts of adaptive coloration as given in Mr. Cott's work are a strong argument in its favour, and must be given due weight. This is what Mr. Cott claims to have accomplished in a volume which will certainly take its place as a most valuable contribution to zoological literature."

=== Looking back (after 2000) ===
Peter Forbes, in his book Dazzled and Deceived, wrote that

Cott's Adaptive Coloration in Animals must be the only compendious zoology tract ever to be packed in a soldier's kitbag. The book also marks the apotheosis of the descriptive natural history phase of mimicry studies. Although Cott does report experiments on predation to test the efficacy of mimicry and camouflage, the book is essentially a narrative of examples plus theory.

Over 60 years after its publication, Adaptive Coloration in Animals remains a core reference on the subject. Sören Nylin and colleagues observe in a 2001 paper that

Adaptive coloration in animals has been a very active research field in evolutionary biology over the years (e.g. Poulton 1890, Cott 1940, Kettlewell 1973, Sillen-Tullberg 1988, Malcolm 1990), and one in which the Lepidoptera have always featured prominently as model species.

— Sören Nylin

As a natural history narrative on what has become an intensely researched experimental subject, Adaptive Coloration could be thought obsolete, but instead, Peter Forbes observes "But Cott's book is still valuable today for its enormous range, for its passionate exposition of the theories of mimicry and camouflage". This width of coverage and continuing relevance can be seen in the introduction to Sami Merilaita and Johan Lind's 2005 paper on camouflage, Background-Matching and Disruptive Coloration, and the Evolution of Cryptic Coloration, which cites Adaptive Coloration no fewer than eight times, quoting his terms "cryptic coloration or camouflage", "concealing coloration", "background matching (also called cryptic resemblance)", "disruptive coloration", resemblance to visual background, and the difficulty a predator has to detect a prey visually.

Steven Vogel, in a review of Peter Forbes's book Dazzled and Deceived (2009), echoes Julian Huxley's words of seventy years before (in his 'Introduction') by writing

The zoologist Hugh Cott had the final word in Adaptive Coloration in Animals (1940), a definitive synthesis of everything known about camouflage and mimicry in nature. Cott ruffled fewer feathers [than Trofim Lysenko or Vladimir Nabokov], and his well-organized and unfanatic ideas proved militarily effective, even under the scrutiny of improved techniques for target detection. Thayer’s principles reemerged in more temperate and rational terms, and camouflage schemes based on them survived both photometric analyses and enemy encounters. Biomimetic camouflage took its place as yet another technique in a sophisticated armamentarium of visual deceptions.

Camouflage researcher Roy Behrens cites and discusses Adaptive Coloration frequently in his writings. For example, in his Camoupedia blog, related to the book of the same name, he writes of Cott's drawings of the hind limbs of the Common frog: "Reproduced above is one of my favorite drawings from what is one of my favorite books." He continues "What makes these drawings (and the book itself) even more interesting is that Cott (1900-1987) was not just a zoologist—he was a highly skilled scientific illustrator (these are his own pen-and-ink drawings), a wildlife photographer, and a prominent British camoufleur in World War II." Still in 2011, Behrens can write of Cott's way of thinking, citing his words as models of clear and accurate explanation of the mechanisms of camouflage: "As he so aptly explained it, disruptive patterns work 'by the optical destruction of what is present', while continuous patterns work 'by the optical construction of what is not present.'"

== Publication history ==
Adaptive Coloration in Animals has been published as follows:

- 1940, Methuen, Frome and London (printed by Butler and Tanner). Foreword by Julian Huxley
- 1940, Oxford University Press, New York
- 1941, Oxford University Press, New York
- 1957, Methuen, London (reprinted with minor corrections)
- 1966, Methuen, London (reprinted with minor corrections)

== See also ==
- Concealing-Coloration in the Animal Kingdom (G. H. Thayer, 1909)
- The Colours of Animals (E. B. Poulton, 1890)
- Animal Coloration (F. E. Beddard, 1892)

== Bibliography ==
- Behrens, Roy R. (2009). Camoupedia: A Compendium of Research on Art, Architecture and Camouflage. Bobolink Books. ISBN 978-0-9713244-6-6.
- Cott, Hugh B. (1940). Adaptive Coloration in Animals. Methuen.
- Forbes, Peter (2009). Dazzled and Deceived: Mimicry and Camouflage. Yale.
- Hubbs, Carl L. (1942). "Book Review:Adaptive Coloration in Animals: Hugh B. Cott". American Naturalist. 76 (764): 318–321. doi:10.1086/281046.
- Poulton, Edward B. (August 1940). "Book Review:Adaptive Coloration in Animals". Nature. 146 (3692): 144–145. doi:10.1038/146144a0. S2CID 4114423.
- Poulton, Edward B. (1890). The Colours of Animals. London: Int. Sci. Ser. LXVIII.
