= George C. Varley =

British entomologist

George Copley Varley (1910–1983) was a British entomologist and a pioneer in the studies of insect population dynamics and was the author of Insect Population Ecology, an influential text. He was Hope Professor of Entomology at Oxford from 1948. A colleague of David Lack during the war years, he conducted studies on insect population dynamics in Wytham Woods. He was married to ichthyologist Margaret Brown.

Varley studied at Manchester Grammar School before joining Sidney Sussex College, Cambridge in 1929 with a scholarship. He won the Frank Smart Prize for zoology in 1933 and became a researcher at the Entomological Field Station. He received a Ph.D. for his studies on "The Natural Control of the Knap-weed Gallfly" conducted from 1935 to 1938. During World War II, he worked on radar installations on the coast where he was a colleague of David Lack. He introduced Lack to ideas on density dependent population regulation and was a close friend, being best man at Lack's wedding. In 1945, Varley became a reader in entomology at King's College, Newcastle-on-Tyne and in 1948 he was appointed Hope Professor at Oxford.
