= Margaret Brown (ichthyologist) =

British ichthyologist (1918-2009)

Margaret Elizabeth Brown
- Born: 28 September 1918; Mussorie, British India
- Died: 18 July 2009 (aged 90)
- Citizenship: British
- Education: Malvern Girls College; Girton College, Cambridge (M.A., Ph.D.)
- Spouse: Professor George C. Varley
- Scientific career
- Fields: Ichthyology, Ecophysiology
- Workplaces: Girton College, Cambridge; University of Cambridge; King's College, London; St Hilda's College, Oxford; Open University

Margaret Elizabeth Brown (28 September 1918 – 18 July 2009) was a British ichthyologist. Her work on the brown trout (Salmo trutta) after World War II "effectively established the discipline of ecophysiology."

== Life ==
Her father serving in the Indian Civil Service, Brown was born in Mussorie, India on 28 September 1918. She attended Malvern Girls College before she won a scholarship to Girton College, Cambridge, in 1937 where she studied zoology under Sidnie Manton. Awarded her M.A. in 1944, she studied the for her Ph.D. which she received the following year. Brown married Professor George C. Varley in 1955 and died on 18 July 2009.

== Work ==
During World War II, Brown was a lecturer at Girton in between stints of farmwork as a land girl. She continued to teach at Girton and the University of Cambridge until 1950 when she was a visiting scientist at the East African Fisheries Research Organization in Jinja, Uganda for a year. Upon her return home, Brown became a lecturer in zoology at King's College, London until her marriage in 1955. She published the seminal Physiology of Fishes that created the field of ecophysiology in 1957. Two years later she was appointed lecturer in zoology at St Hilda's College, Oxford and became a tutor in 1961. Brown became a senior lecturer at the Open University in 1969 and was promoted to reader in 1969. She was a member of the Linnean Society and served as their vice-president in 1982. The cichlid Haplochromis brownae is thought to be named in her honour.
