= Geraldine Wright =

British insect neuroethologist

- Education: University of Wyoming (BSc), University of Oxford (PhD)
- Scientific career
- Workplaces: Ohio State University, Newcastle University, University of Oxford

Geraldine (Jeri) Wright is an insect neuroethologist in the United Kingdom. In 2018 she became the Professor of Comparative Physiology/Organismal Biology at the University of Oxford and in 2021 she was appointed Hope Professor of Zoology.

== Education and career ==
Born in Wyoming in the United States, Wright did a BSc in Botany at the University of Wyoming and then a PhD in insect nutrition and herbivory at Hertford College, University of Oxford as a Rhodes Scholar in 1994.

She moved to Ohio State University to do postdoctoral research on olfaction in honeybees in the Rothenbuhler Honeybee Laboratory and she also completed an MSc in Statistics at Ohio State University.

Wright later moved to Newcastle University as a lecturer, then Reader and subsequently Professor in Neuroethology. She moved to the University of Oxford in 2018 where she is Professor of Comparative Physiology/Organismal Biology and Tutorial Fellow of Hertford College.

== Research ==
Wright's research has looked at the effects of intoxication in honeybees with ethanol, finding that with increased ethanol consumption the bees spent less time on normal behaviours such as flying, walking and grooming, and instead spent more time upside down.

She has also done research to look for emotions in bees, testing their responses to smells that were unfamiliar to them. Bees that had been subjected to an uncomfortable experience prior to the test were less likely to test the smells, and were perceived as pessimists compared to those that had not had the experience. Levels of neurotransmitters such as Octopamine, dopamine and serotonin were also lower in bees that had the uncomfortable experience.

Her work has also looked at the effects of insecticides on bees, finding that a combination of insecticides can have a greater detrimental effect on bee learning and memory than a single compound. Wright also found that the nicotine present in neonicotinoid insecticides may 'give bees a buzz', as honeybees and bumblebees preferred food containing neonicotinoids over that without. In contrast she found that caffeine can improve the memory of bees of a particular scent that might bear nectar and subsequent research by Wright showed that bees have two neurons in each tastebud which help regulate bees' response to particular tastes.
