= Edward Bagnall Poulton =

British evolutionary biologist

Sir Edward Bagnall Poulton FRS HFRSE FLS
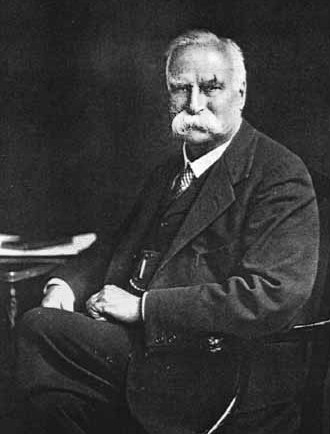
- Photograph by James Lafayette
- Born: 27 January 1856; Reading, Berkshire, England
- Died: 20 November 1943 (aged 87); Oxford, Oxfordshire, England
- Education: Jesus College, Oxford
- Known for: Aposematism, frequency-dependent selection, camouflage
- Awards: Linnean Medal (1922); Hope Professor of Zoology
- Scientific career
- Fields: Evolutionary biology
- Workplaces: University of Oxford

Sir Edward Bagnall Poulton, FRS HFRSE FLS (27 January 1856 – 20 November 1943) was a British evolutionary biologist, a lifelong advocate of natural selection through a period in which many scientists such as Reginald Punnett doubted its importance. He invented the term sympatric for evolution of species in the same place, and in his book The Colours of Animals (1890) was the first to recognise frequency-dependent selection. He is remembered for his pioneering work on animal coloration and camouflage, and in particular for inventing the term aposematism for warning coloration. He became Hope Professor of Zoology at the University of Oxford in 1893.

== Life ==
Edward Poulton was born in Reading, Berkshire on 27 January 1856, the son of the architect William Ford Poulton and his wife, Georgina Sabrina Bagnall. He was educated at Oakley House School in Reading, which he described as having mainly nonconformist pupils.

Between 1873 and 1876, Poulton studied at Jesus College, Oxford under George Rolleston and the anti-Darwinian entomologist John Obadiah Westwood, graduating with a first-class degree in natural science. He maintained an unbroken connection with the college for seventy years as scholar, lecturer and Fellow (appointed to a fellowship in 1898) until his death. He was a generous benefactor to Jesus College, providing silver for the high table and redecorating the Old Bursary amongst other donations.

He was knighted by King George V in the 1935 New Year Honours. Poulton died in Oxford on 20 November 1943.

== Career ==
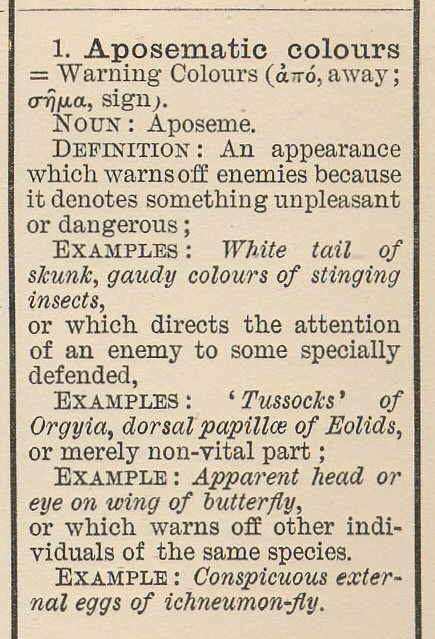
The Colours of Animals, 1890, introduced terms including "aposematic".

Poulton was a Darwinist, believing in natural selection as the primary force in evolution. His 1890 book, The Colours of Animals, introduced the concepts of frequency-dependent selection and aposematic coloration, as well as supporting Darwin's then unpopular theories of natural selection and sexual selection. He conducted a range of experiments on the colours of polymorphic caterpillars to examine if food, background or other factors are involved in their colour changes. He was able to show that the caterpillars were sensitive to the background colours and that it was perceived even when they were blinded, and was among the earliest to suggest extraocular photoreception.

Poulton enlarged the Hope entomological collections with his catches in the field which earned him the nickname of "Bag-all" Poulton. Many of the specimens are unmounted and held in biscuit tins.

In his 1896 book Charles Darwin and the Theory of Natural Selection, Poulton described Darwin's On the Origin of Species as "incomparably the greatest work" that the biological sciences had seen. Critics of natural selection, Poulton contended, had not taken the time to understand it.

Poulton, along with Julian Huxley, J.B.S. Haldane, R.A. Fisher and E.B. Ford, promoted the idea of natural selection throughout the period of the eclipse of Darwinism, when it was denigrated. There was a long debate between Poulton and the geneticist Reginald Punnett, one of Bateson's disciples. Punnett's 1915 Mimicry in Butterflies rejected selection as the main cause of mimicry, while Poulton supported it. Further, Poulton's 1908 Essays on Evolution opposed genetics on the grounds that "Mendelism" was an obstacle to evolutionary thought; but he changed his mind and came to support the work of the Genetical Society.

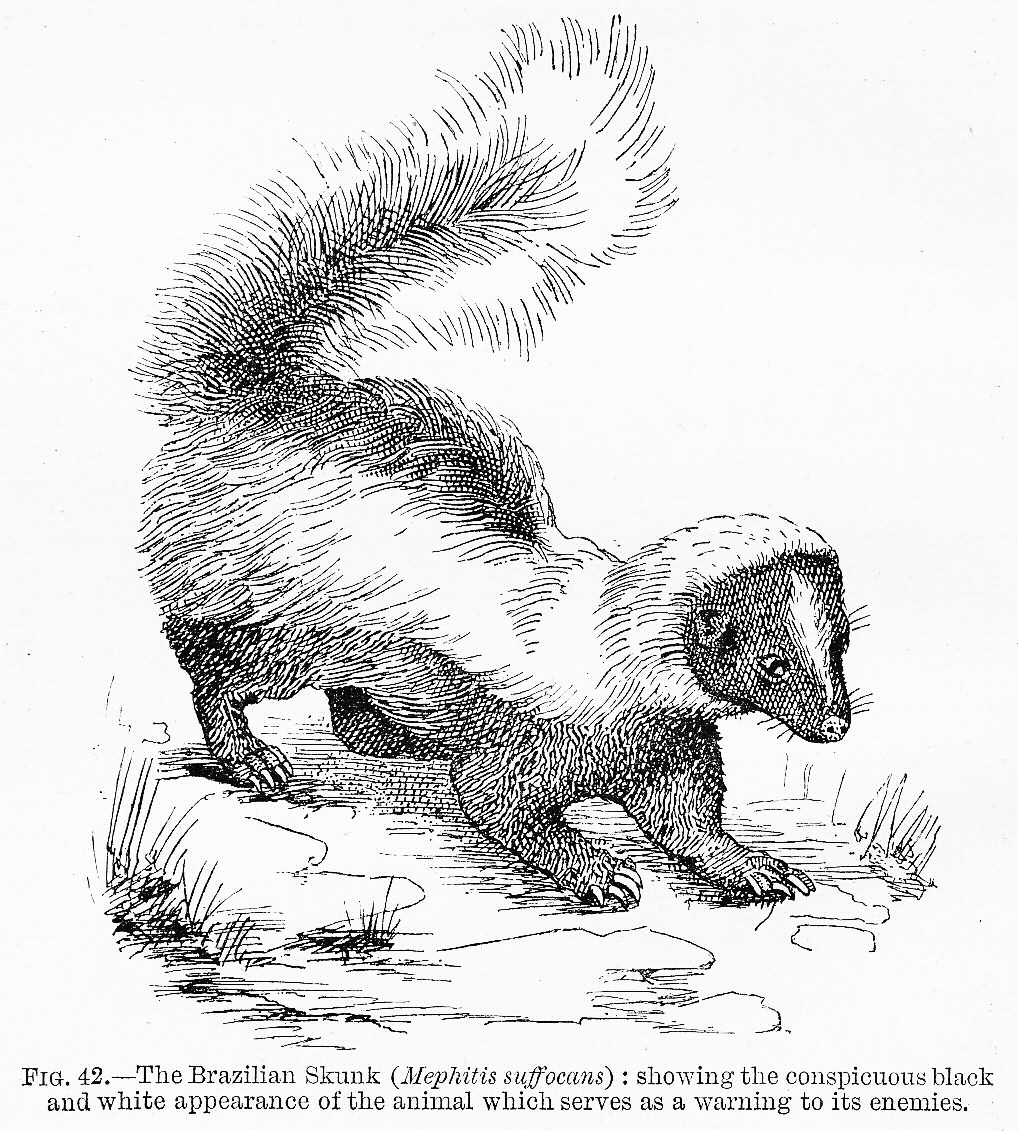
Warning coloration of the "Brazilian Skunk" in The Colours of Animals: Poulton introduced the term aposematism in the book.

Poulton's Presidential Address to the British Association in 1937 at the age of 81 reviewed the history of evolutionary thought. He stated that the work of J.B.S. Haldane, R.A. Fisher and Julian Huxley was vitally important for showing the relationships between Mendelism and natural selection. The observations and experiments of many biologists had "immensely strengthened and confirmed" the researches on mimicry and warning colours of pioneers like Bates, Wallace, Meldola, Trimen and Müller.

== Family ==
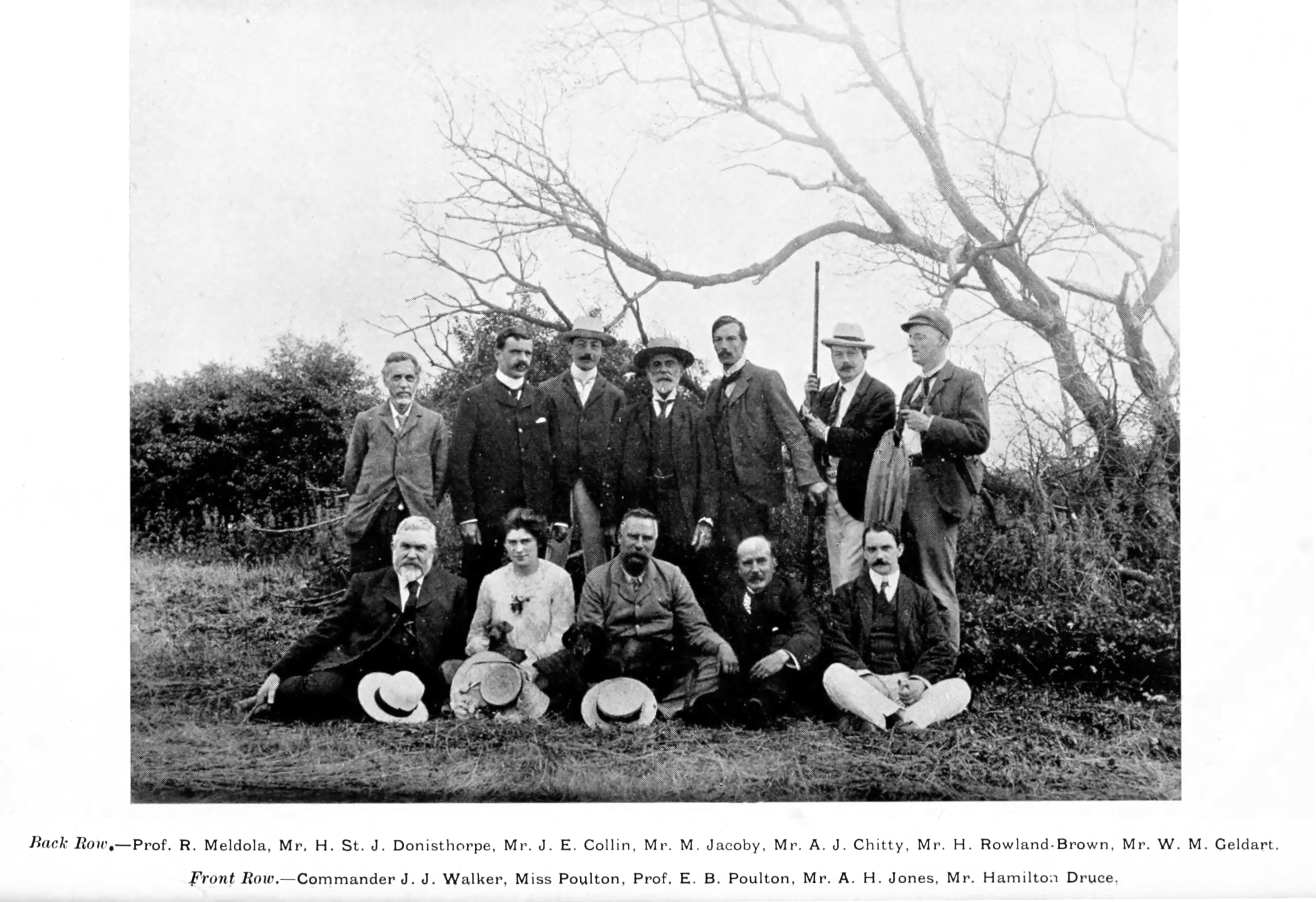
Poulton with the Entomological Society in 1904 (sitting, centre)

Poulton lived with his family at 56 Banbury Road in North Oxford, a large Victorian Gothic house designed by John Gibbs and built in 1866. In 1881, he married Emily Palmer (d.1939), daughter of George Palmer, Member of Parliament for Reading and head of Huntley and Palmer's biscuit company; they had five children. Three of them were dead by 1919. Their eldest son Dr Edward Palmer Poulton of Guy's Hospital died in 1939, meaning that Sir Edward was outlived only by his daughter Margaret Lucy (1887–1965), wife of Dr Maxwell Garnett. Poulton's son, Ronald Poulton-Palmer played international rugby for England and was killed in May 1915 in World War I. His first daughter Hilda married Dr Ernest Ainsley-Walker and died in 1917. His youngest daughter, Janet Palmer, married Charles Symonds in 1915 and died in 1919.

Through his daughter Margaret, he was the grandfather of Labour politician Peggy Jay.

== Legacy ==
Poulton is remembered as an early originator of the biological species concept. According to Ernst Mayr, Poulton invented the term sympatric in relation to species.

== Published works ==
Poulton had over 200 publications spanning over sixty years.

- 1890. The Colours of Animals: Their Meaning and Use, Especially Considered in the Case of Insects. Kegan Paul, London.
- 1896. Charles Darwin and the Theory of Natural Selection. Cassell, London.
- 1904. What is a Species? (Presidential address to the Entomological Society of London, January 1904) Proceedings of the Entomological Society of London, 1903.
- 1908. Essays on Evolution. London, Cassell.
- 1909. Charles Darwin and the Origin of species; addresses, etc., in America and England in the year of the two anniversaries
- 1915. Science and the Great War: The Romanes Lecture for 1915 Clarendon Press, Oxford.

== Awards and honours ==
- Fellow of the Royal Society in June 1889.
- President of the Linnean Society (1912–1916)
- Royal Society's Darwin Medal in 1914
- Linnean Society's Linnean Medal in 1922.
- Knighted in 1935.
- President of the British Association for the Advancement of Science for 1937.

== See also ==
- Adaptive Coloration in Animals (book by Hugh Cott)
