= Frank Evers Beddard =

English zoologist (1858–1925)

Frank Evers Beddard FRS FRSE
- Born: 19 June 1858; Dudley, England
- Died: 14 July 1925 (aged 67); West Hampstead, England
- Education: New College, Oxford
- Known for: Annelids; Animal coloration
- Awards: Linnean Medal (1916)
- Scientific career
- Fields: Annelid Zoology
- Workplaces: Zoological Society of London
- Author abbrev. (zoology): F.E.B.

Frank Evers Beddard FRS FRSE (19 June 1858 – 14 July 1925) was an English zoologist. He became a leading authority on annelids, including earthworms. He won the Linnean Medal in 1916 for his book on oligochaetes.

== Life ==
Beddard was born in Dudley, Worcestershire the son of John Beddard. He was educated at Harrow and New College, Oxford. He died at West Hampstead in London. In 1881, aged 22, he lodged at 81a Princes Street, Edinburgh at Anna Campbell's lodging house. His fellow lodger was the Scottish biologist and town planner Patrick Geddes.

== Career ==
Beddard was naturalist to the Challenger Expedition Commission from 1882 to 1884. In 1884 he was appointed prosector, responsible for preparing dissections of animals that had died, at the Zoological Society of London, following the death of William Alexander Forbes.

Beddard became lecturer in biology at Guy's Hospital, examiner in zoology and comparative anatomy at the University of London, and lecturer in morphology at Oxford University.

Apart from his publications on wide-ranging topics in zoology, such as Isopoda, Mammalia, ornithology, zoogeography and animal coloration, Beddard became particularly noted as an authority on the annelids, publishing two books on the group and contributing articles on earthworms, leeches and also on another phylum of worms, the Nematoda for the 1911 Encyclopædia Britannica, where he used the initials "F.E.B.". Coles cites W.H. Hudson's 1919 The book of a naturalist, page 347:

One evening I was with Mr Frank E. Beddard at his club and taking advantage of the occasion, asked him some question about earthworms, he being the greatest authority in the universe on the subject.

Beddard contributed biographies of zoologists William Henry Flower and John Anderson for the Dictionary of National Biography. He was the author of volume 10 (Mammalia) of the Cambridge Natural History.

== Legacy ==
Beddard's olingo (Pocock, 1921) is named after him.

== Works ==
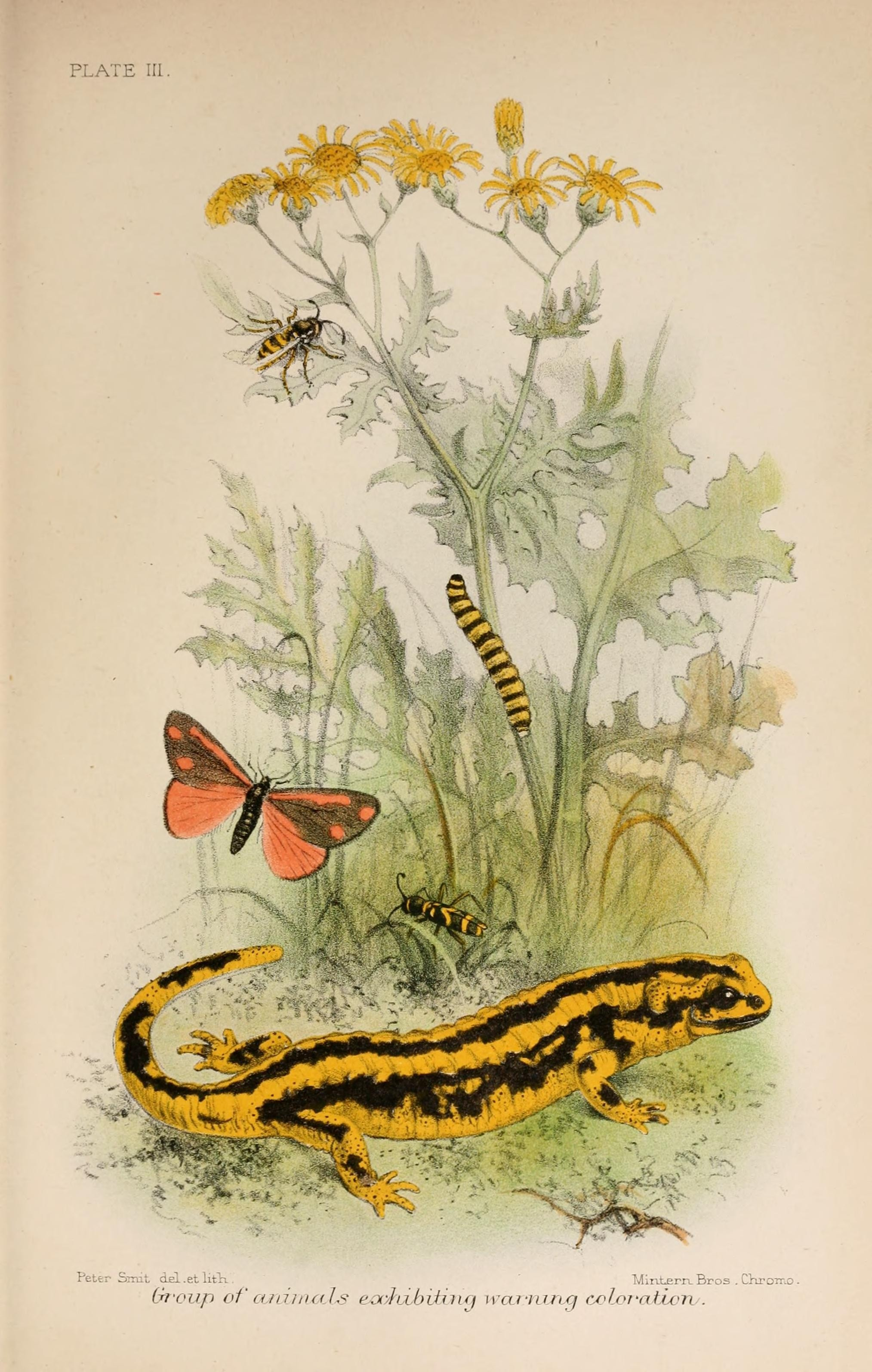
Plate III, "Group of animals exhibiting warning coloration", from Animal coloration (1892)

=== Books ===
- Report on the Isopoda collected by H. M. S. Challenger during the years 1873–76 HMSO, 1884.
- Animal Coloration: an account of the principal facts and theories relating to the colours and markings of animals Swan Sonnenschein, 1892.
- A Text-book of Zoogeography. Cambridge University Press, 1895.
- A Monograph of the Order of Oligochaeta. Oxford at the Clarendon Press, 1895.
- A Book of Whales. John Murray, 1895.
- The Cambridge natural history. Vol 10 Mammalia. Macmillan, 1895.
- Elementary Zoology. Longmans, Green, 1898.
- The Structure and Classification of Birds Longmans, Green, 1898.
- Mammalia, Macmillan, 1902.
- Natural History in Zoological Gardens: Being Some Account of Vertebrated Animals, Archibald Constable, 1905.
- Earthworms and Their Allies. Cambridge University Press, 1912.

=== Chapters ===
- Hudson, W.H. and Beddard, Frank E. British Birds. Chapter on structure and classification. First edition 1898. Longmans, Green, 1921.
