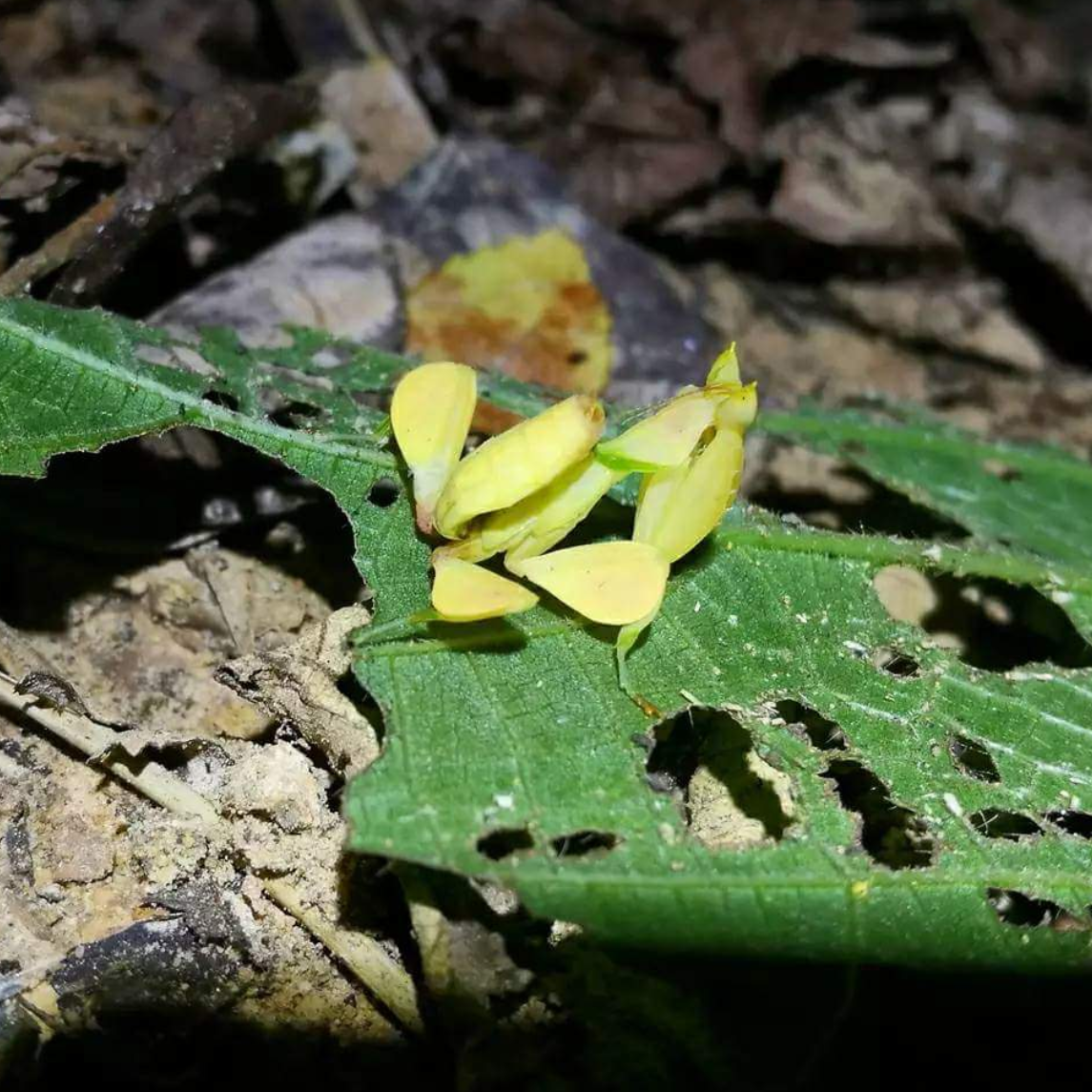

Scientific classification
- Kingdom: Animalia
- Phylum: Arthropoda
- Clade: Pancrustacea
- Class: Insecta
- Order: Mantodea
- Family: Hymenopodidae
- Genus: Hymenopus
- Species: H. coronatoides

Binomial name
- Hymenopus coronatoides Wang, Liu & Yin, 1994

= Hymenopus coronatoides =

Species of praying mantis

Hymenopus coronatoides is a proposed species of praying mantis that have been found in Jinghong County, Yunnan, China.

== Taxonomy ==
The species was later rejected as a junior subjective synonym of Hymenopus coronatus Manuel [in Olivier], 1797 by Delfosse, 2007.

== Etymology ==
The suffix "-ides" in Greek means literally 'son of', or, more generally, 'descendant of'. It usually has the meaning 'resembling something', in this case resembling the previously described species Hymenopus coronatus, with the same "coronat" as stem (itself referring to the shared crown-like structures on the insect's heads). Here, the suffix "-oides" adopted the additional -o- between components of composed words.

== See also ==
- List of mantis genera and species
- Flower Mantis
