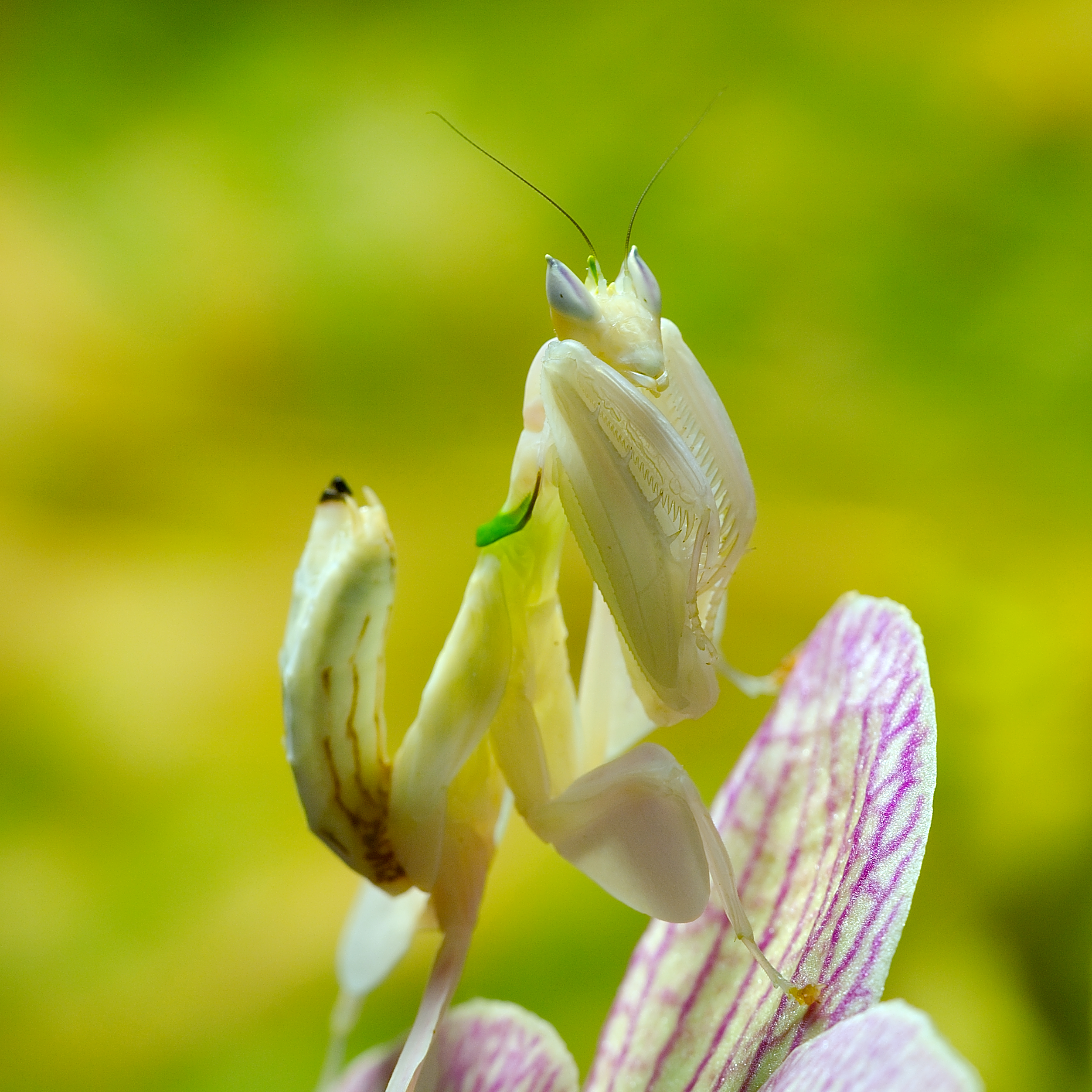
- Sub-adult female

Scientific classification
- Kingdom: Animalia
- Phylum: Arthropoda
- Clade: Pancrustacea
- Class: Insecta
- Order: Mantodea
- Family: Hymenopodidae
- Genus: Hymenopus
- Species: H. coronatus

Binomial name
- Hymenopus coronatus (Manuel in Olivier, 1797)

= Hymenopus coronatus =

Species of praying mantis

Hymenopus coronatus is a mantis from the tropical forests of Southeast Asia. It is known by various common names, including walking flower mantis, orchid-blossom mantis and (pink) orchid mantis. It is one of several species known as flower mantises, a reference to their unique physical form and behaviour, which often involves moving with a "swaying" motion, as if being "blown" in the breeze. The species has evolved to mimic orchid flowers as a hunting and camouflaging strategy, "hiding" themselves in plain view and preying upon pollinating insects that visit the blooms. They then grab their prey with sudden speed.

== Description ==
This species mimics parts of the orchid flower. The four walking legs resemble flower petals, and the toothed front pair is used as in other mantises for grasping prey.

H. coronatus shows some of the most pronounced size sexual dimorphism of any species of mantis; males can be less than half the size of females. The female predatory selection is the likely driving force behind the development of the extreme sexual size dimorphism. Prior to development of its camouflage, the female mantis implements ambush predation to allow it to hunt larger pollinating insects. An example of this ambush predation is the orchid mantis's ability to ambush foraging butterflies, a fairly large prey, which it captures using its pair of toothed arms and powerful bite. As the female mantis continues to develop, much of its dramatic increase in size can be attributed to predatory selection and ambush predation.

First-stage nymphs mimic bugs of the family Reduviidae, which have a powerful bite and are foul-tasting.

The mantis can change its colour between pink and brown, according to the colour of the background.

== Distribution ==
Hymenopus coronatus is found in tropical regions of Southeast Asia, including Cambodia, Indonesia, Laos, Malaysia, Myanmar, Singapore, Thailand, Vietnam. It may also extend into the far eastern regions of India and Bangladesh. This accords with the most northerly historic record from Sivasagar, in Northeast India (stated as "Sibságar, Assam") by Wood-Mason, 1878.

== Behaviour ==
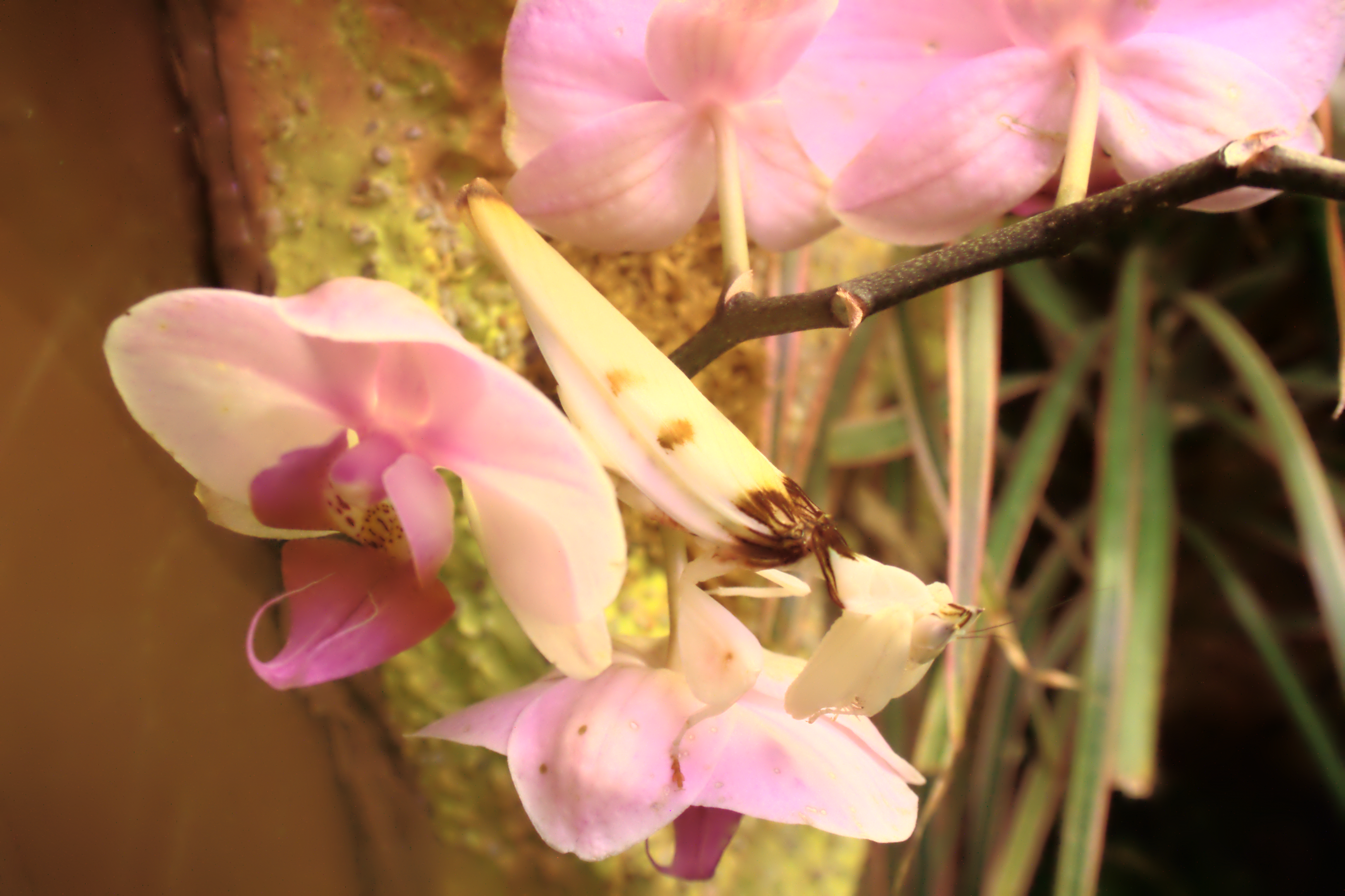
An adult female H. coronatus on and mimicking a Phalaenopsis orchid

Hugh Cott referenced an early-20th-century account by Nelson Annandale of Hymenopus coronatus, in which he details how the mantis hunts on the flowers of the "Straits rhododendron" (Melastoma polyanthum). The nymph has what Cott calls "special alluring coloration", where the animal itself acts as a "decoy". The insect is pink-and-white (like many orchid blooms), possessing flattened limbs which feature "that semi-opalescent, semi-crystalline appearance that is caused in flower-petals by a purely structural arrangement of liquid globules or empty cells". The mantis climbs up and down the twigs of the plant until it finds a cluster of flowers. It holds on to these with the claws of its two rearmost pairs of legs. It then sways from side to side, mimicking the wind; soon, various small flies and insects will land on and around the flowers, attracted by nectar as well as the small, black spot on the end of the mantis's abdomen, which resembles a fly. When a larger Dipteran fly—as big as a house fly—was observed landing nearby, the mantis at once seized and ate it.

Mimicry has been widely discussed since the 1861 description by Henry Walter Bates. While the orchid mantis is successful at catching its prey through its color mimicry alone, recent research shows that orchid mantises attract an greater number of natural pollinators when compared to actual flowers, labelling these mantises as 'aggressive mimics' with their ability to turn pollinators into prey. In a concurrent study, the spectral reflection of orchid mantises was measured using a spectrometer to determine how their colour may be perceived by other animals. Adult and juvenile orchid mantises primarily reflected UV-absorbing white and, based on visual modeling, their colour is indistinguishable from actual flowers (from the perspectives of the pollinating insects).

The female of the species is, reported by Costa (quoting Shelford's 1903 account), to show parental care by guarding her eggs. Costa asks rhetorically, "Why has so little [research] been done on parental care in mantids, such an unexpected and intriguing aspect of their behavior?"

The camouflage of the orchid mantis probably deceives potential predators, as well as serving as an aggressive mimicry of the orchid to help catch insect prey.

== Diet ==
The orchid mantis is a carnivorous insectivore, mainly catching other insects. In the laboratory setting, it prefers lepidopteran prey. Its diet in nature is much the same as orchid mantises kept in captivity, and consists of small insects like crickets, flies, fruit flies, beetles, and smaller stinging insects such as bees or miniature wasps. They may also prey upon caterpillars and other insect larvae. Some are cannibalistic, eating their own kind when one strays too close.

== In human culture ==
=== History ===
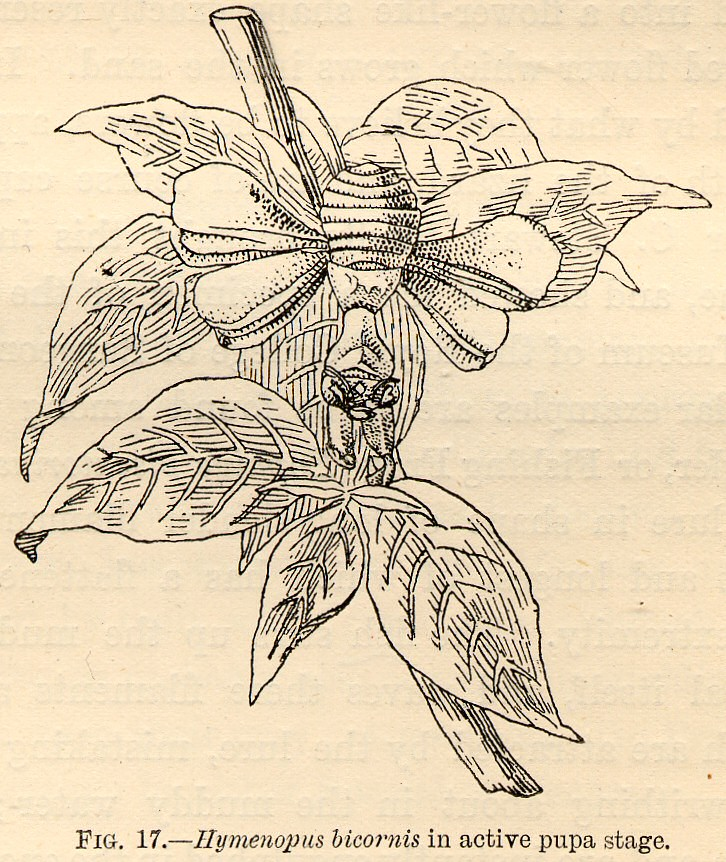
Drawing of nymph of "Hymenopus bicornis in active pupa[l] stage" by James Wood-Mason, who sent it to Alfred Russel Wallace, who in turn lent it to Edward Bagnall Poulton for his 1890 book The Colours of Animals

Alfred Russel Wallace in his 1889 book Darwinism, calls the mantis rare:

A beautiful drawing of this rare insect, Hymenopus bicornis (in the nymph or active pupa state), was kindly sent me by Mr. Wood-Mason, Curator of the Indian Museum at Calcutta. A species, very similar to it, inhabits Java, where it is said to resemble a pink orchid. Other Mantidae, of the genus Gongylus, have the anterior part of the thorax dilated and coloured either white, pink, or purple; and they so closely resemble flowers that, according to Mr. Wood-Mason, one of them, having a bright violet-blue prothoracic shield, was found in Pegu by a botanist, and was for a moment mistaken by him for a flower. See Proc. Ent. Soc. Lond., 1878, p. liii.

— Alfred Russel Wallace

The drawing was published in Edward Bagnall Poulton's book The Colours of Animals. Poulton calls it an "Indian Mantis" which "feeds upon other insects, which it attracts by its flower-like shape and pink colour. The apparent petals are the flattened legs of the insect."

=== Breeding ===
The orchid mantis is favoured by insect breeders, but is extremely rare, so it is also extremely expensive.

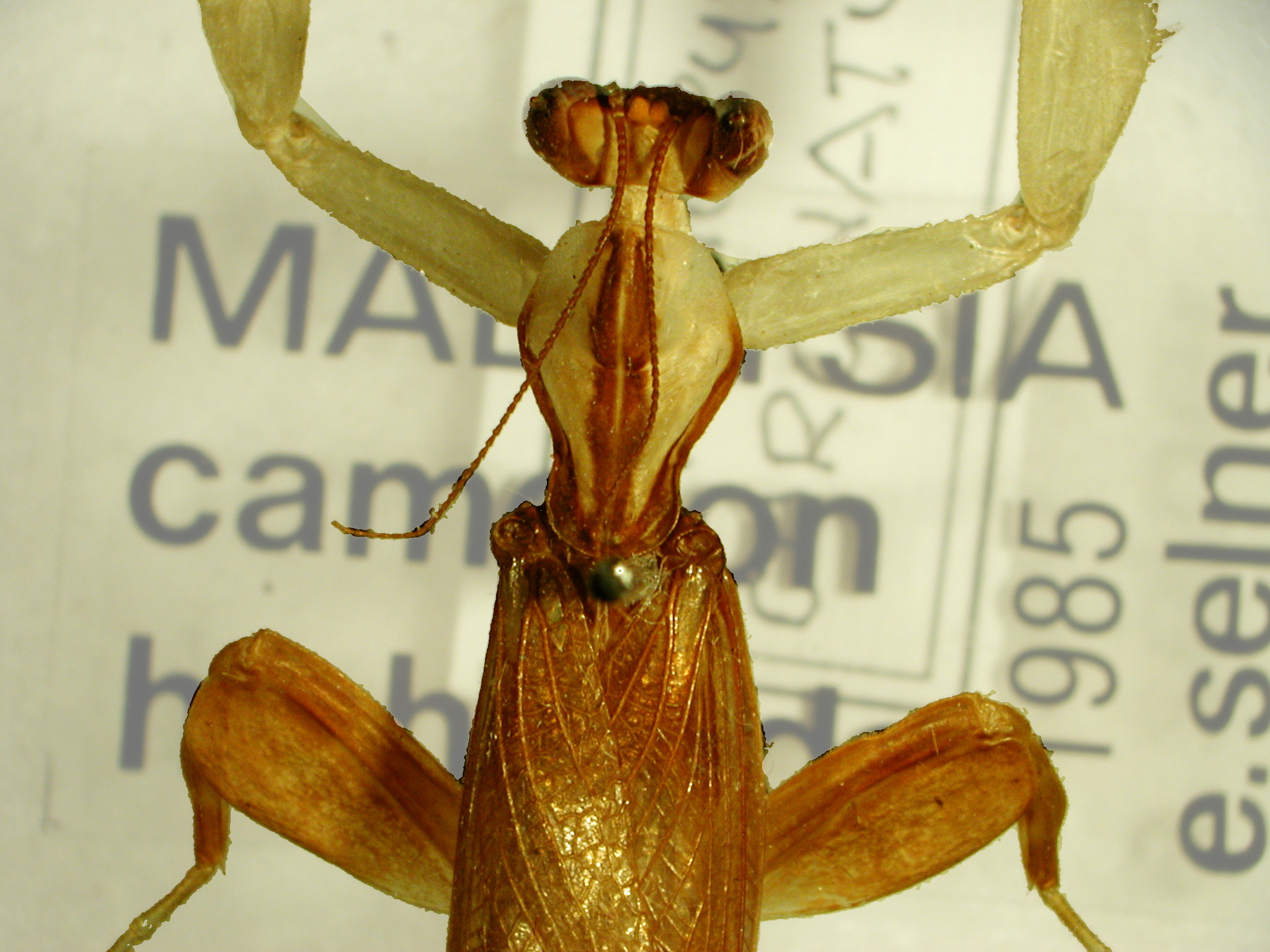
Mounted adult male

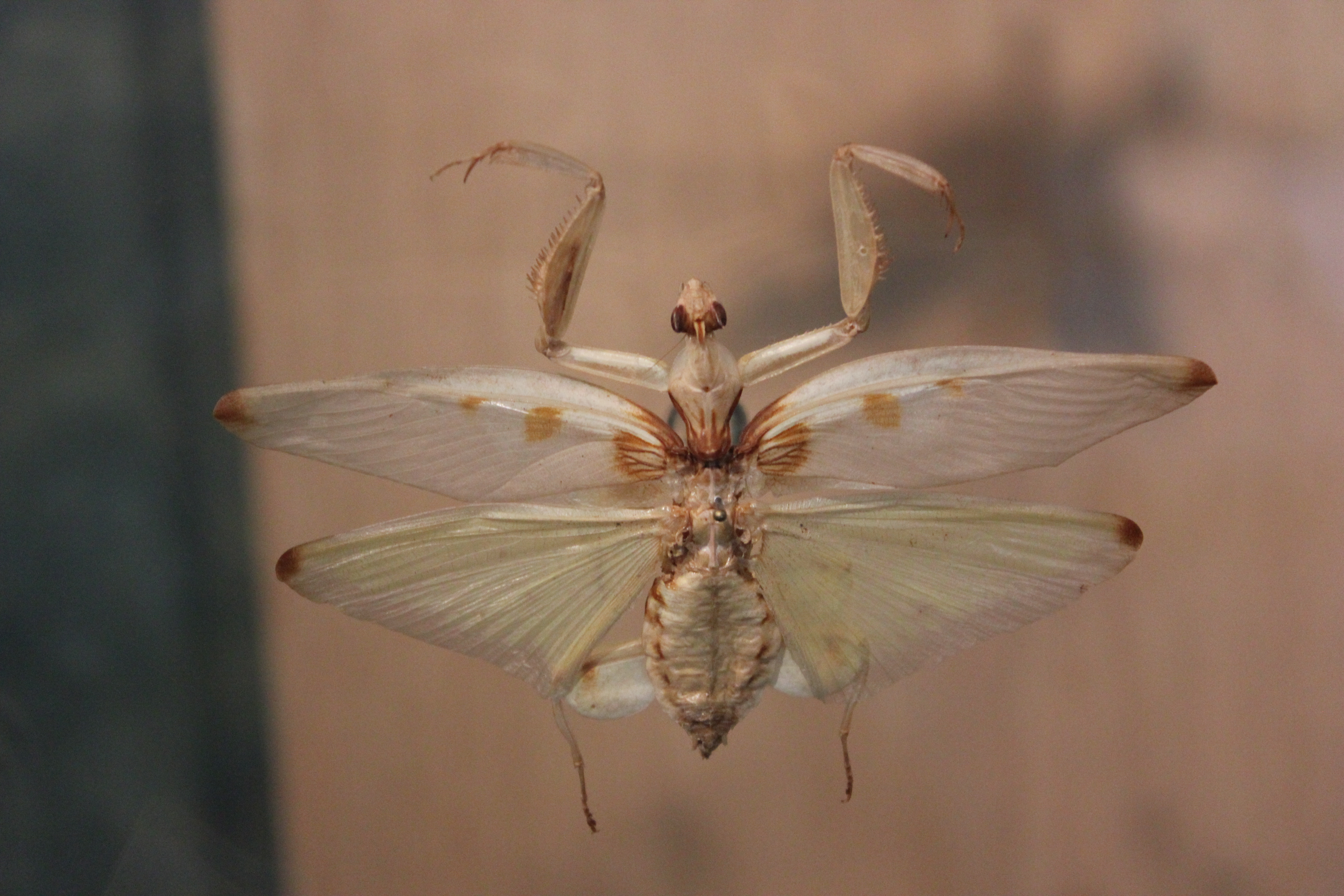
Mounted female

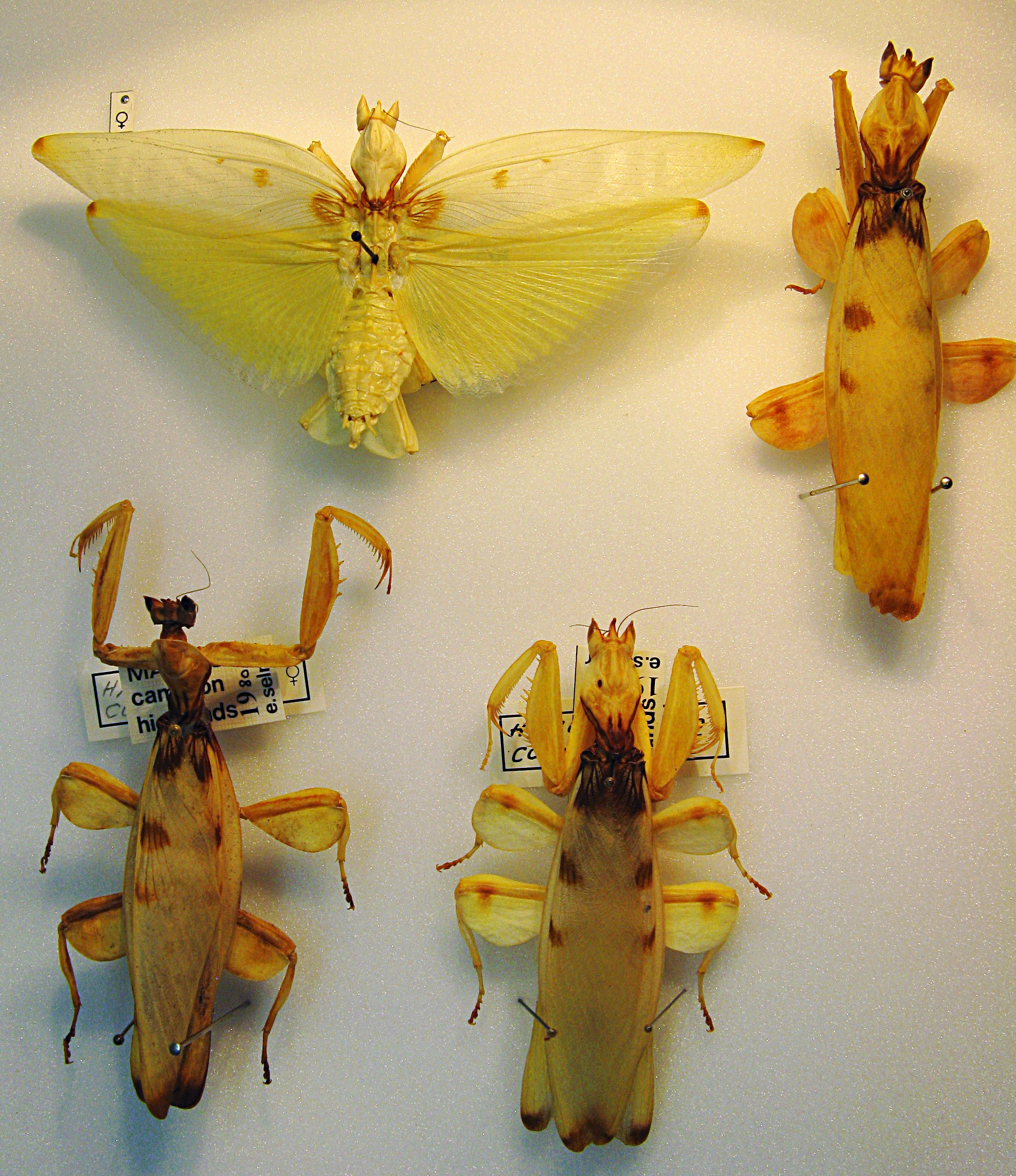
Display of adult females

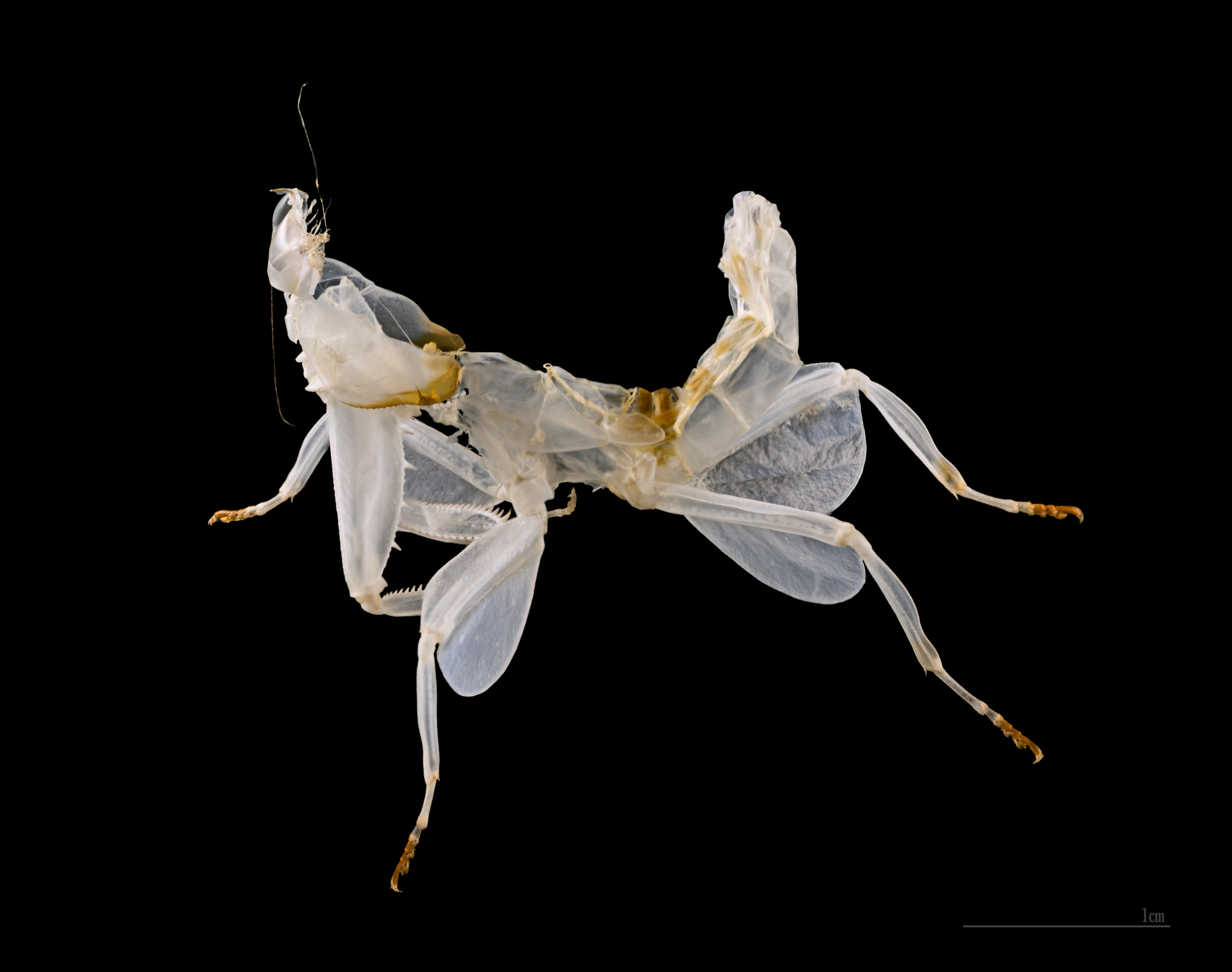
Last instar exuviae

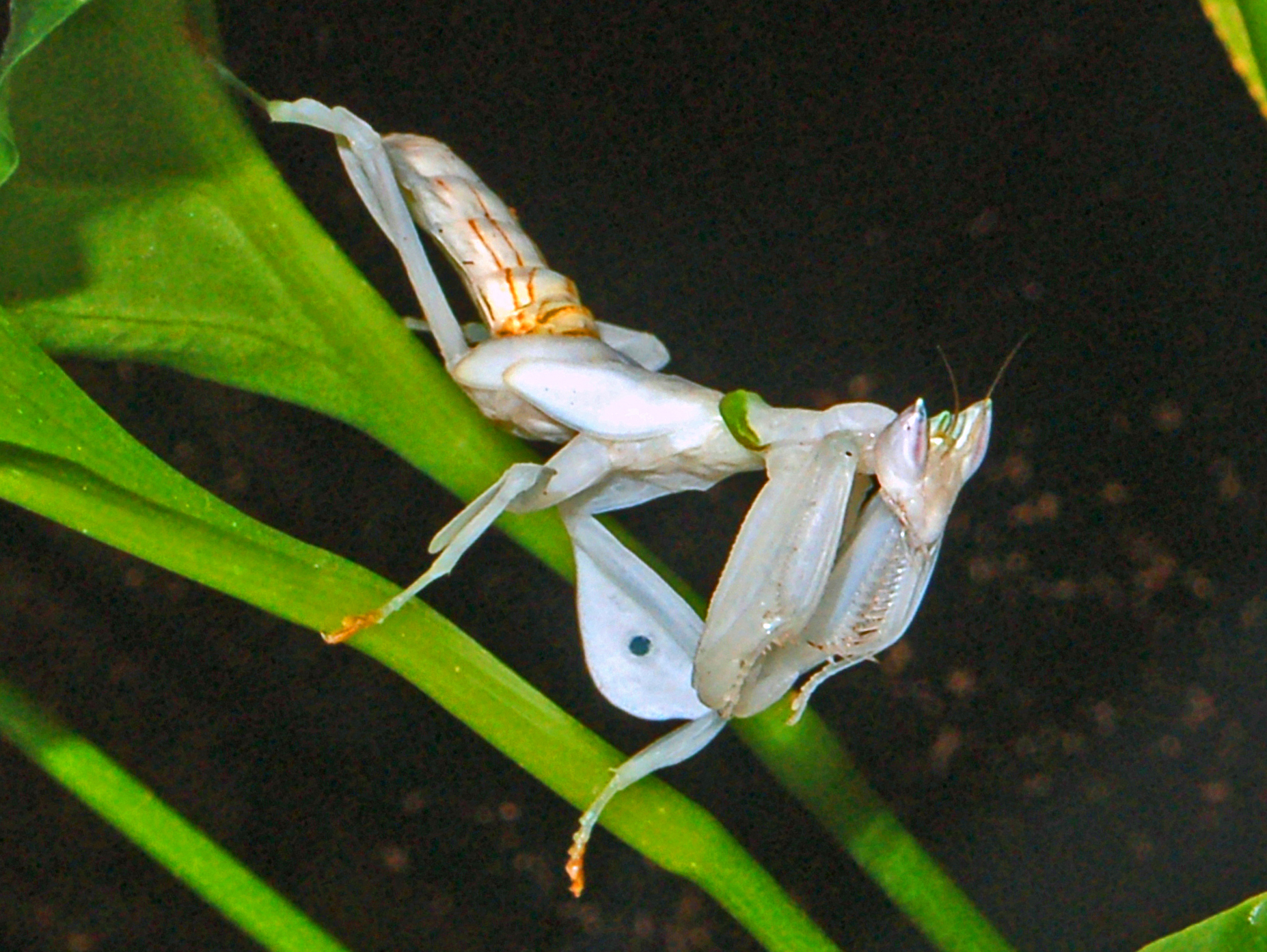
Late instar female

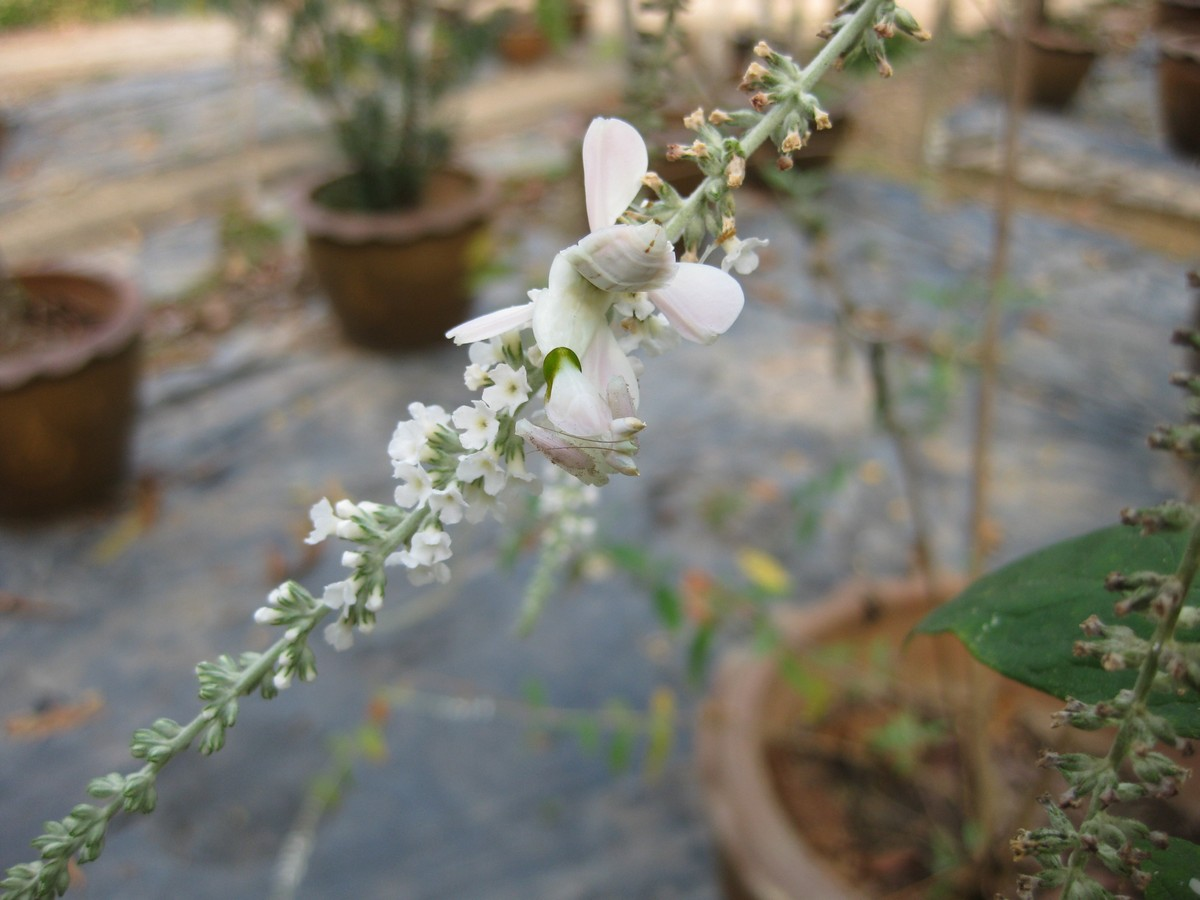
Late instar female on flowers from Chiang Mai Province, Thailand

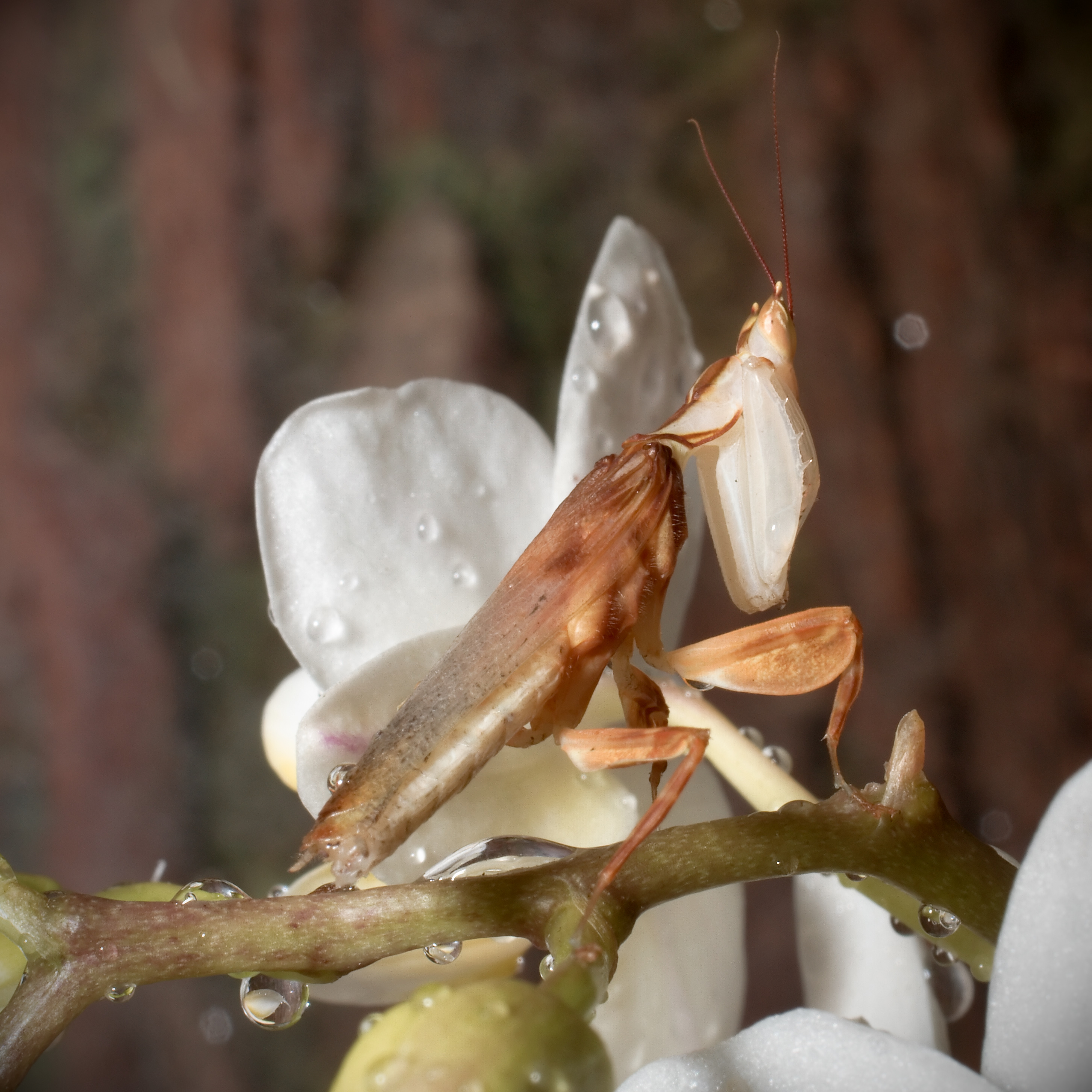
Adult male

== See also ==
- List of mantis genera and species
- Flower mantis

== Bibliography ==
- Cott, Hugh Bamford (1940). Adaptive Coloration in Animals. London: Methuen.
- Poulton, Edward Bagnall (1890). The Colours of Animals: Their Meaning and Use, Especially Considered in the Case of Insects. Kegan Paul, Trench, Trübner. pp. 74–75.
- Prete, Frederick R (1999). The Praying Mantids. JHU Press. p. 313.
- Wallace, Alfred Russel (1889). Darwinism: An Exposition of the Theory of Natural Selection, with Some of Its Applications . Macmillan – via Wikisource.
  - O'Hanlon, James C.; Holwell, Gregory I.; Herberstein, Marie E. (2014-01-01). "Pollinator Deception in the Orchid Mantis". The American Naturalist. 183 (1): 126–132. doi:10.1086/673858. ISSN 0003-0147.Svenson, Gavin J.; Brannoch,
    - Research on how orchid mantises catch and attract their prey. Use information about orchid mantis behavior.
  - Sydney K.; Rodrigues, Henrique M.; O'Hanlon, James C.; Wieland, Frank (2016-12-01). "Selection for predation, not female fecundity, explains sexual size dimorphism in the orchid mantises". Scientific Reports. 6 (1): 37753. doi:10.1038/srep37753. ISSN 2045-2322.
    - Explains the differences in behavior, description, and reproduction in female orchid mantises versus males.
  - O'hanlon, J. C.; Li, D.; Norma-Rashid, Y. (2013-07). "Coloration and Morphology of the Orchid Mantis Hymenopus coronatus (Mantodea: Hymenopodidae)". Journal of Orthoptera Research. 22 (1): 35–44
    - Describes the color and morphology of orchid mantises, as well as their ability of mimicry.
