= Coloration evidence for natural selection =

Early evidence for Darwinism from animal coloration

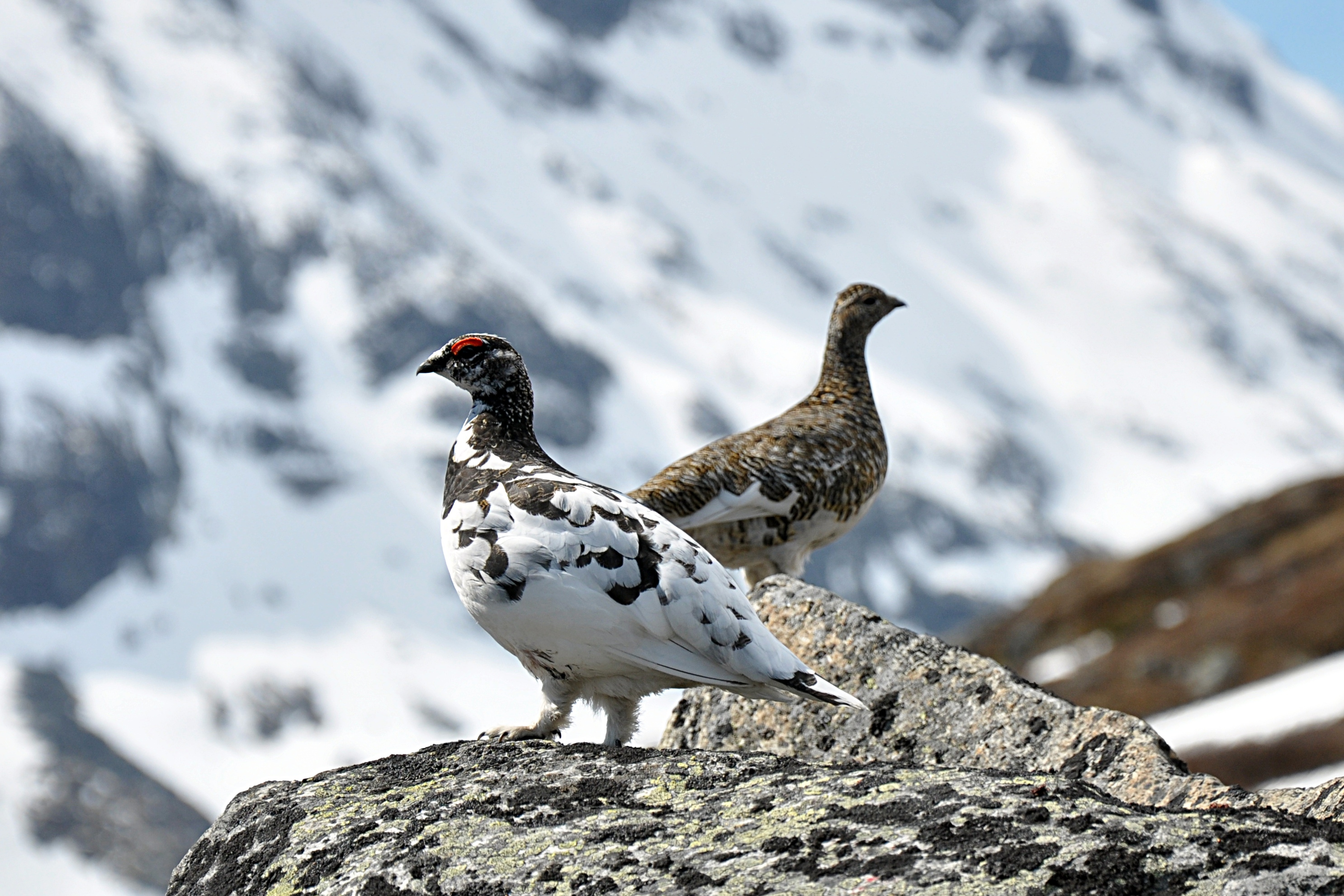
Natural selection has driven the ptarmigan to change from snow camouflage in winter to disruptive coloration suiting moorland in summer.

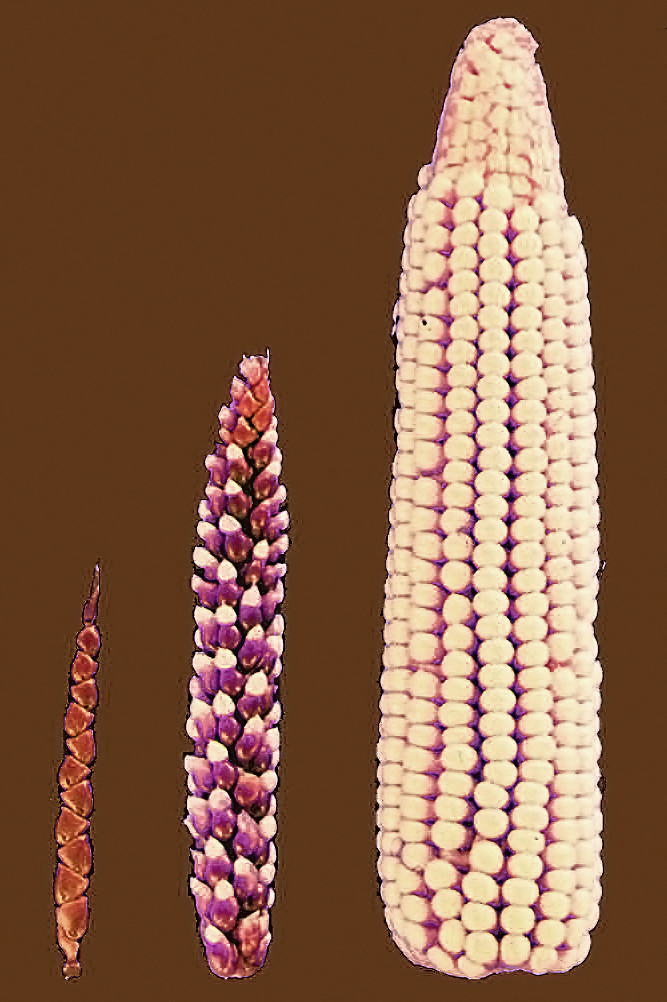
Selective breeding transformed teosinte's small spikes (left) into modern maize (right). Darwin argued that evolution worked in a similar way.

Animal coloration provided important early evidence for evolution by natural selection, at a time when little direct evidence was available. Three major functions of coloration were discovered in the second half of the 19th century, and subsequently used as evidence of selection: camouflage (protective coloration); mimicry, both Batesian and Müllerian; and aposematism.

Charles Darwin's On the Origin of Species was published in 1859, arguing from circumstantial evidence that selection by human breeders could produce change, and that since there was clearly a struggle for existence, that natural selection must be taking place. But he lacked an explanation either for genetic variation or for heredity, both essential to the theory. Many alternative theories were accordingly considered by biologists, threatening to undermine Darwinian evolution.

Some of the first evidence was provided by Darwin's contemporaries, the naturalists Henry Walter Bates and Fritz Müller. They described forms of mimicry that now carry their names, based on their observations of tropical butterflies. These highly specific patterns of coloration are readily explained by natural selection, since predators such as birds which hunt by sight will more often catch and kill insects that are less good mimics of distasteful models than those that are better mimics, but the patterns are otherwise hard to explain.

Darwinists such as Alfred Russel Wallace and Edward Bagnall Poulton, and in the 20th century Hugh Cott and Bernard Kettlewell, sought evidence that natural selection was taking place. Wallace noted that snow camouflage, especially plumage and pelage that changed with the seasons, suggested an obvious explanation as an adaptation for concealment. Poulton's 1890 book, The Colours of Animals, written during Darwinism's lowest ebb, used all the forms of coloration to argue the case for natural selection. Cott described many kinds of camouflage, and in particular his drawings of coincident disruptive coloration in frogs convinced other biologists that these deceptive markings were products of natural selection. Kettlewell experimented on peppered moth evolution, showing that the species had adapted as pollution changed the environment; this provided compelling evidence of Darwinian evolution.

== Context ==
Charles Darwin published On the Origin of Species in 1859, arguing that evolution in nature must be driven by natural selection, just as breeds of domestic animals and cultivars of crop plants were driven by artificial selection. Darwin's theory radically altered popular and scientific opinion about the development of life. However, he lacked evidence and explanations for some critical components of the evolutionary process. He could not explain the source of variation in traits within a species, and did not have a mechanism of heredity that could pass traits faithfully from one generation to the next. This made his theory vulnerable; alternative theories were being explored during the eclipse of Darwinism; and so Darwinian field naturalists like Wallace, Bates and Müller looked for clear evidence that natural selection actually occurred. Animal coloration, readily observable, soon provided strong and independent lines of evidence, from camouflage, mimicry and aposematism, that natural selection was indeed at work. The historian of science Peter J. Bowler wrote that Darwin's theory "was also extended to the broader topics of protective resemblances and mimicry, and this was its greatest triumph in explaining adaptations".

== Camouflage ==
=== Snow camouflage ===
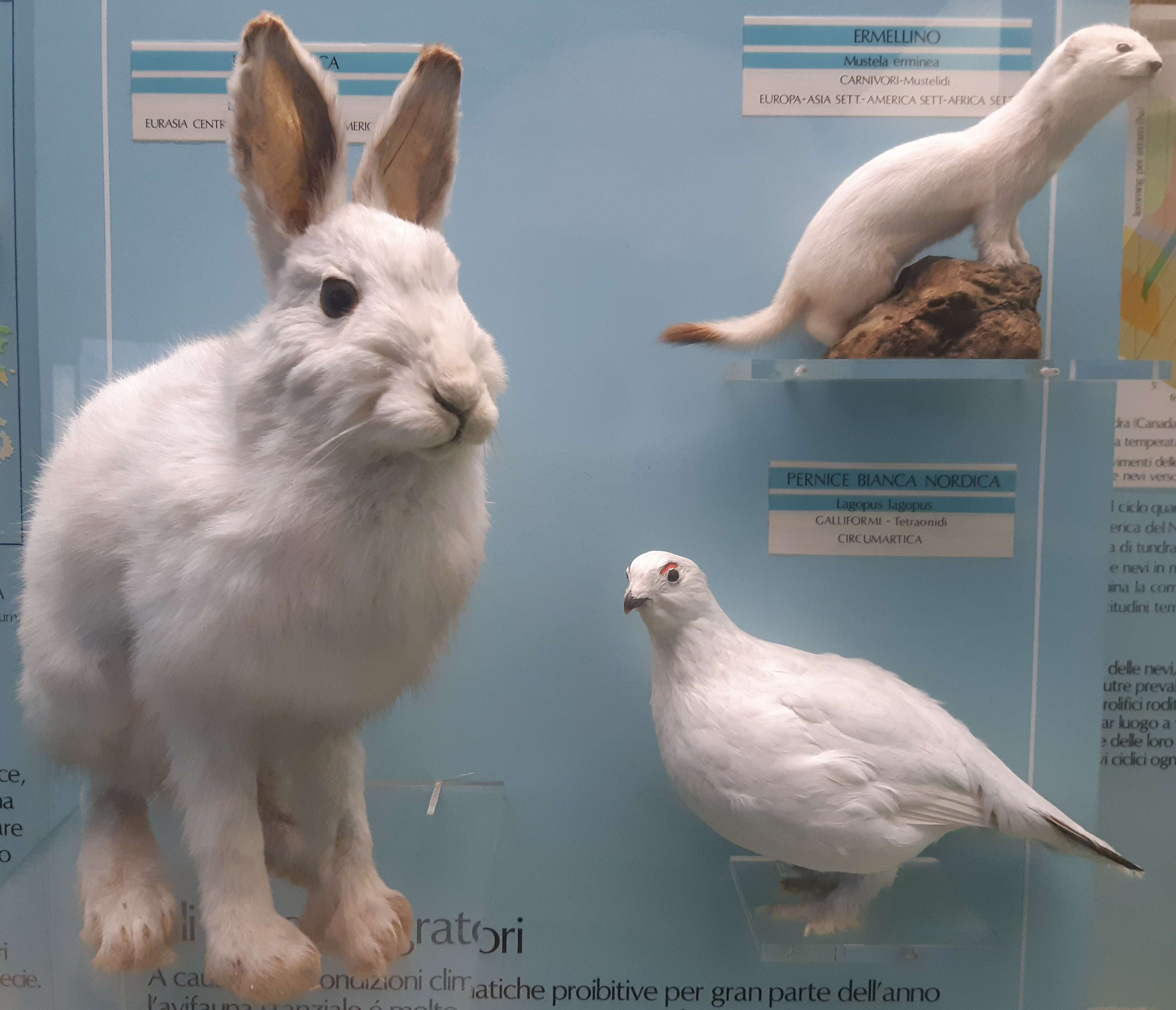
Convergent evolution of snow camouflage in Arctic hare, ermine, and ptarmigan provided early evidence for natural selection.

In his 1889 book Darwinism, the naturalist Alfred Russel Wallace considered the white coloration of Arctic animals. He recorded that the Arctic fox, Arctic hare, ermine and ptarmigan change their colour seasonally, and gave "the obvious explanation", that it was for concealment. (Note: In the case of prey animals like the Arctic hare, this is concealment from predators, reducing the chance of being seen and eaten, directly affecting survival. In the case of predators like the Arctic fox, camouflage provides concealment from prey, increasing the change of a successful hunt, and again improving survival chances. Thus whether the camouflage is defensive or aggressive, it would be favoured by natural selection. Edward Bagnall Poulton named the two cases "general protective resemblance" and "general aggressive resemblance" respectively.) The modern ornithologist W. L. N. Tickell, reviewing proposed explanations of white plumage in birds, writes that in the ptarmigan "it is difficult to escape the conclusion that cryptic brown summer plumage becomes a liability in snow, and white plumage is therefore another cryptic adaptation." All the same, he notes, "in spite of winter plumage, many Ptarmigan in NE Iceland are killed by Gyrfalcons throughout the winter."

More recently, decreasing snow cover in Poland, caused by global warming, is reflected in a reduced percentage of white-coated weasels that become white in winter. Days with snow cover halved between 1997 and 2007, and as few as 20 percent of the weasels had white winter coats. This was shown to be a result of natural selection by predators making use of camouflage mismatch.

=== Coincident disruptive coloration ===
Hugh Cott's drawings of 'coincident disruptive coloration' formed "persuasive arguments" for natural selection. Left: active; right: at rest, marks coinciding.

In the words of camouflage researchers Innes Cuthill and A. Székely, the English zoologist and camouflage expert Hugh Cott's 1940 book Adaptive Coloration in Animals provided "persuasive arguments for the survival value of coloration, and for adaptation in general, at a time when natural selection was far from universally accepted within evolutionary biology."

In particular, they argue, "Coincident Disruptive Coloration" (one of Cott's categories) "made Cott's drawings the most compelling evidence for natural selection enhancing survival through disruptive camouflage."

Cott explained, while discussing "a little frog known as Megalixalus fornasinii" in his chapter on coincident disruptive coloration, that "it is only when the pattern is considered in relation to the frog's normal attitude of rest that its remarkable nature becomes apparent... The attitude and very striking colour-scheme thus combine to produce an extraordinary effect, whose deceptive appearance depends upon the breaking up of the entire form into two strongly contrasted areas of brown and white. Considered separately, neither part resembles part of a frog. Together in nature the white configuration alone is conspicuous. This stands out and distracts the observer's attention from the true form and contour of the body and appendages on which it is superimposed".

Cott concluded that the effect was concealment "so long as the false configuration is recognized in preference to the real one". Such patterns embody, as Cott stressed, considerable precision as the markings must line up accurately for the disguise to work. Cott's description and in particular his drawings convinced biologists that the markings, and hence the camouflage, must have survival value (rather than occurring by chance); and further, as Cuthill and Székely indicate, that the bodies of animals that have such patterns must indeed have been shaped by natural selection.

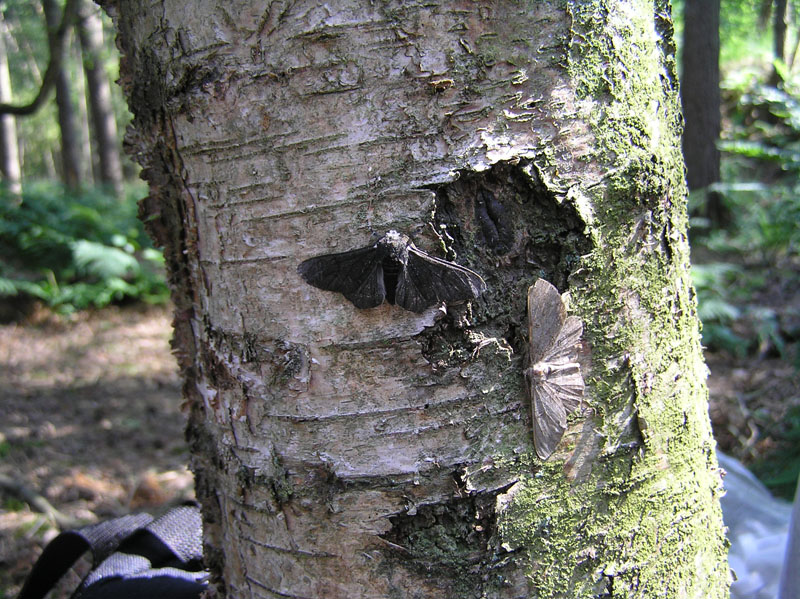
Bernard Kettlewell claimed that changes in the frequencies of light and dark morphs of the peppered moth, Biston betularia were direct evidence of natural selection.

=== Industrial melanism ===
Between 1953 and 1956, the geneticist Bernard Kettlewell experimented on peppered moth evolution. He presented results showing that in a polluted urban wood with dark tree trunks, dark moths survived better than pale ones, causing industrial melanism, whereas in a clean rural wood with paler trunks, pale moths survived better than dark ones. The implication was that survival was caused by camouflage against suitable backgrounds, where predators hunting by sight (insect-eating birds, such as the great tits used in the experiment) selectively caught and killed the less well-camouflaged moths. The results were intensely controversial, and from 2001 Michael Majerus carefully repeated the experiment. The results were published posthumously in 2012, vindicating Kettlewell's work as "the most direct evidence", and "one of the clearest and most easily understood examples of Darwinian evolution in action".

== Mimicry ==
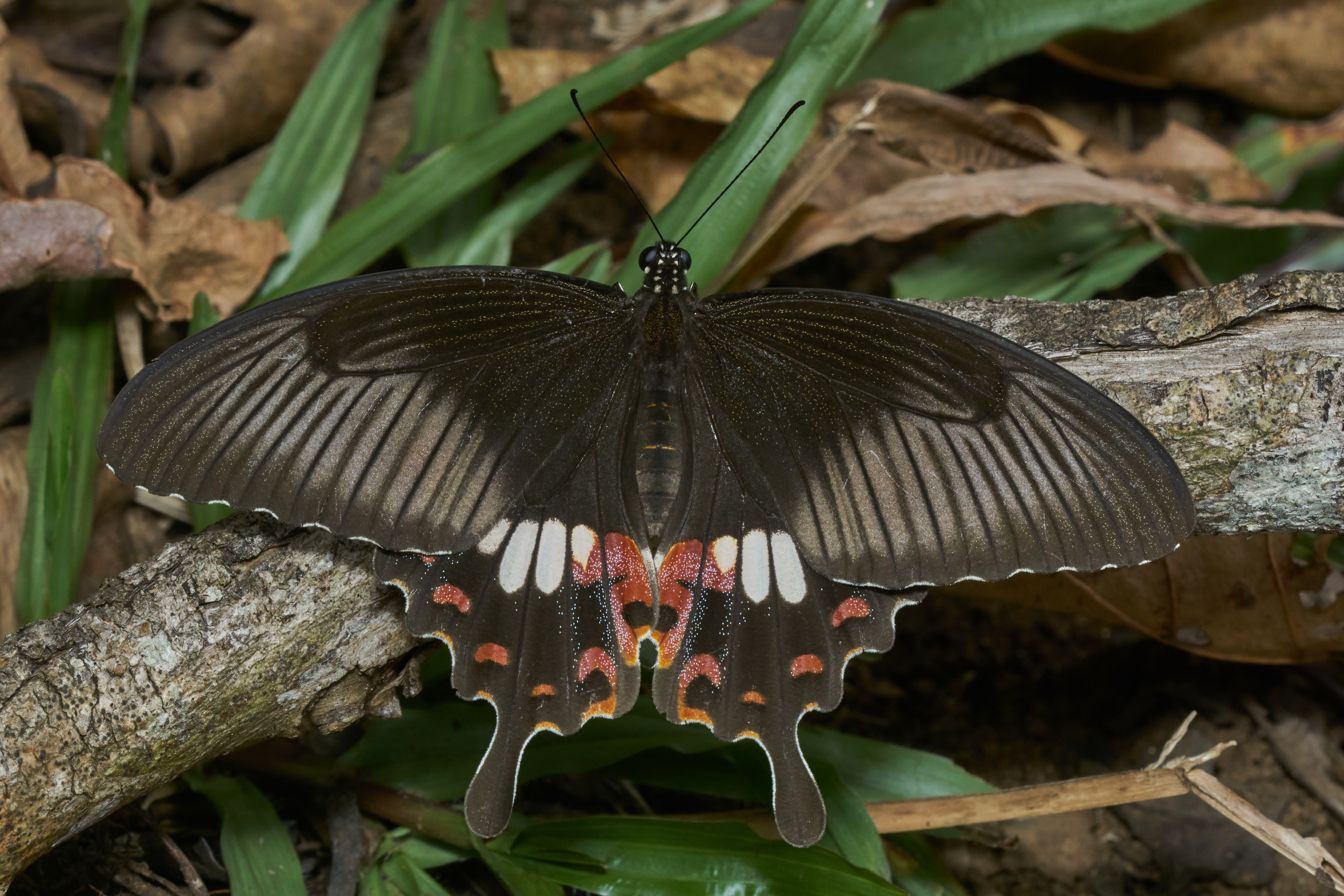
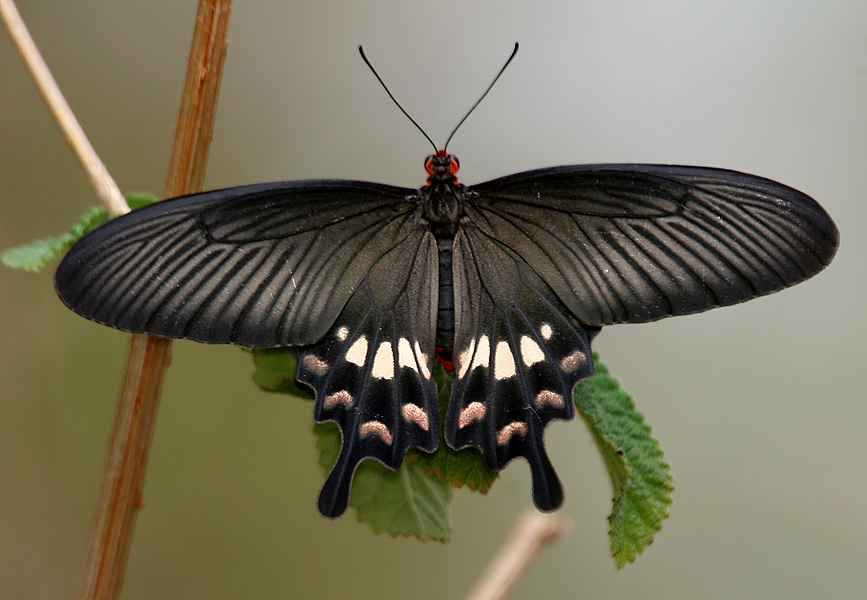
The butterfly Papilio polytes (left) mimics the unpalatable Pachliopta aristolochiae (right).

=== Batesian ===
Batesian mimicry, named for the 19th century naturalist Henry Walter Bates who first noted the effect in 1861, "provides numerous excellent examples of natural selection" at work. The evolutionary entomologist James Mallet noted that mimicry was "arguably the oldest Darwinian theory not attributable to Darwin." Inspired by On the Origin of Species, Bates realised that unrelated Amazonian butterflies resembled each other when they lived in the same areas, but had different coloration in different locations in the Amazon, something that could only have been caused by adaptation.

=== Müllerian ===
Müllerian mimicry, too, in which two or more distasteful species that share one or more predators have come to mimic each other's warning signals, was clearly adaptive; Fritz Müller described the effect in 1879, in an account notable for being the first use of a mathematical argument in evolutionary ecology to show how powerful the effect of natural selection would be. (Note: If one may ignore, as Mallet comments, Malthus's discussion of the effects of population growth that influenced Darwin.)

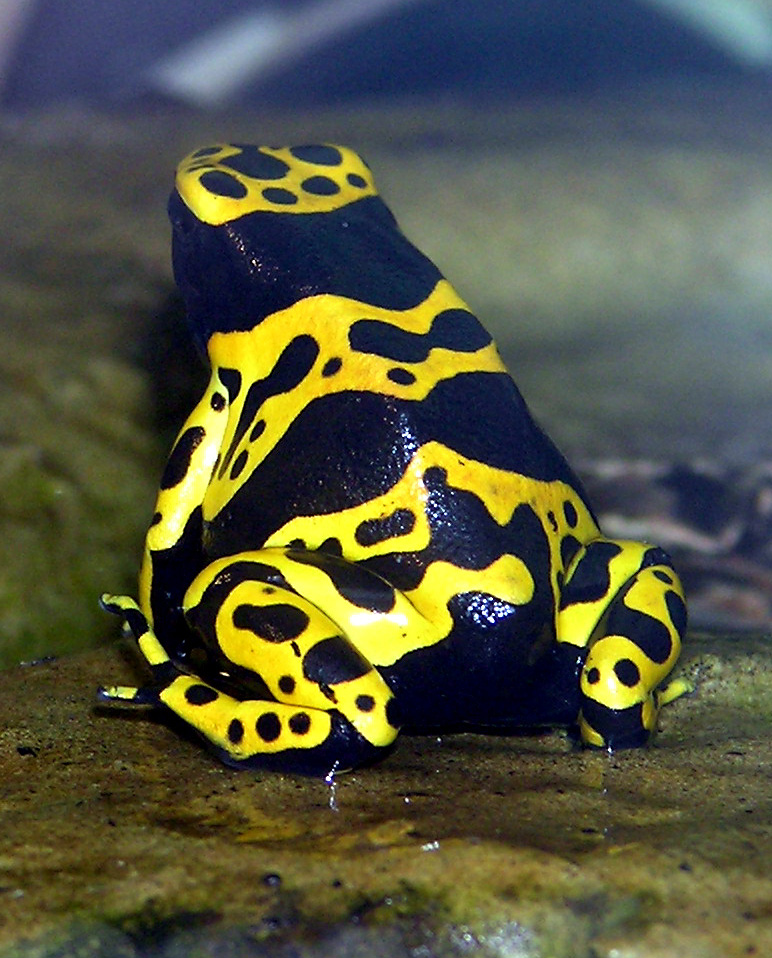
Warning coloration protects poison dart frog Dendrobates leucomelas.

== Aposematism ==
In 1867, in a letter to Darwin, Wallace described warning coloration. The evolutionary zoologist James Mallet notes that this discovery "rather illogically" followed rather than preceded the accounts of Batesian and Müllerian mimicry, which both rely on the existence and effectiveness of warning coloration. (Note: Edward Bagnall Poulton invented the name aposematism some years later, in 1890, in his book The Colours of Animals.) The conspicuous colours and patterns of animals with strong defences such as toxins are advertised to predators, signalling honestly that the animal is not worth attacking. This directly increases the reproductive fitness of the potential prey, providing a strong selective advantage. The existence of unequivocal warning coloration is therefore clear evidence of natural selection at work.

== Defence of Darwinism ==
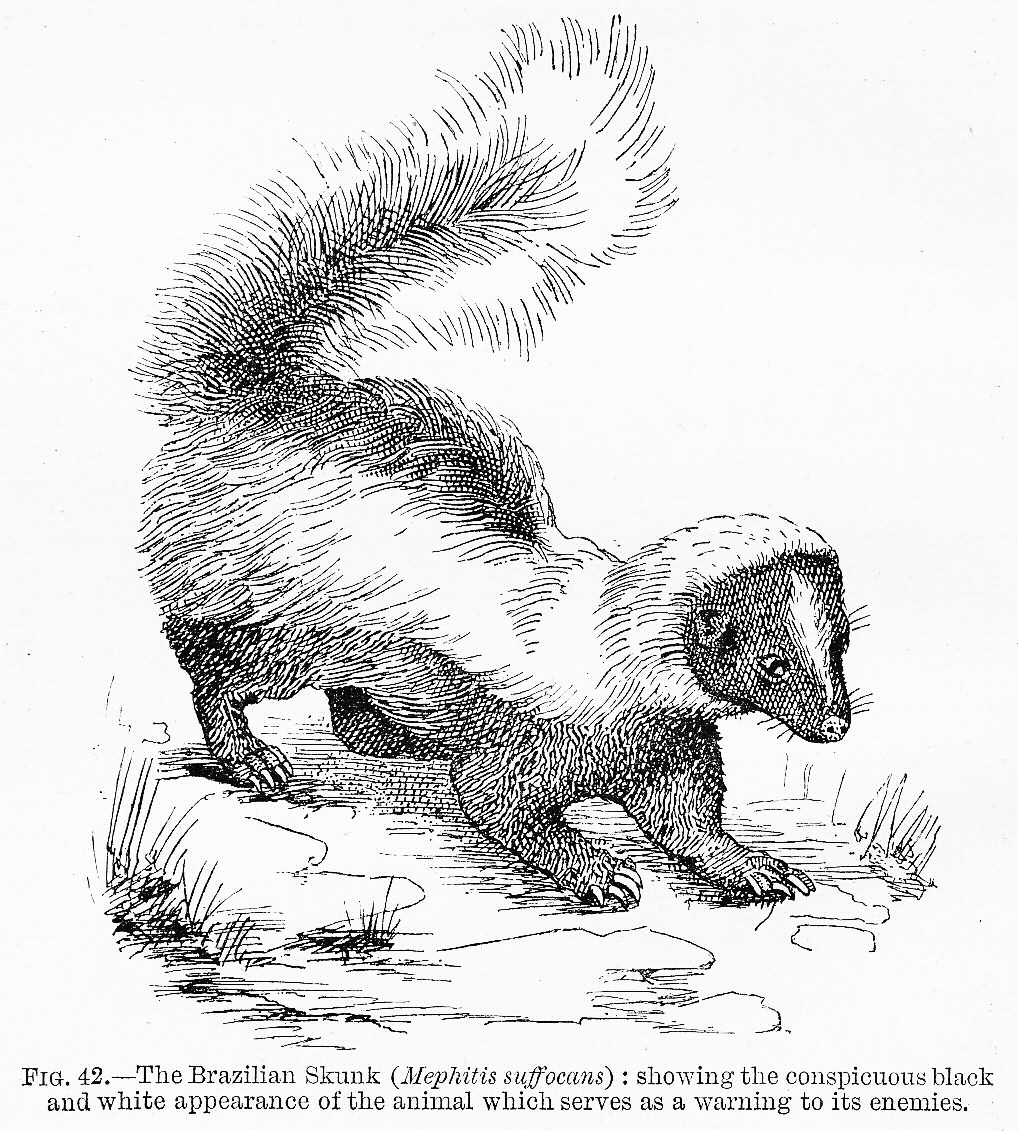
Warning coloration of the "Brazilian Skunk" in Edward Bagnall Poulton's The Colours of Animals, 1890

Edward Bagnall Poulton's 1890 book, The Colours of Animals, renamed Wallace's concept of warning colours "aposematic" coloration, as well as supporting Darwin's then unpopular theories of natural selection and sexual selection. Poulton's explanations of coloration are emphatically Darwinian. For example, on aposematic coloration he wrote that

At first sight the existence of this group seems to be a difficulty in the way of the general applicability of the theory of natural selection. Warning Colours appear to benefit the would-be enemies rather than the conspicuous forms themselves, and the origin and growth of a character intended solely for the advantage of some other species cannot be explained by the theory of natural selection. But the conspicuous animal is greatly benefited by its Warning Colours. If it resembled its surroundings like the members of the other class, it would be liable to a great deal of accidental or experimental tasting, and there would be nothing about it to impress the memory of an enemy, and thus to prevent the continual destruction of individuals. The object of Warning Colours is to assist the education of enemies, enabling them to easily learn and remember the animals which are to be avoided. The great advantage conferred upon the conspicuous species is obvious when it is remembered that such an easy and successful education means an education involving only a small sacrifice of life."

Poulton summed up his allegiance to Darwinism as an explanation of Batesian mimicry in one sentence: "Every step in the gradually increasing change of the mimicking in the direction of specially protected form, would have been an advantage in the struggle for existence".

The historian of biology Peter J. Bowler commented that Poulton used his book to complain about experimentalists' lack of attention to what field naturalists (like Wallace, Bates, and Poulton) could readily see were adaptive features. Bowler added that "The fact that the adaptive significance of coloration was (sic) widely challenged indicates just how far anti-Darwinian feeling had developed. (Note: In the eclipse of Darwinism.) Only field naturalists such as Poulton refused to give in, convinced that their observations showed the validity of selection, whatever the theoretical problems."
