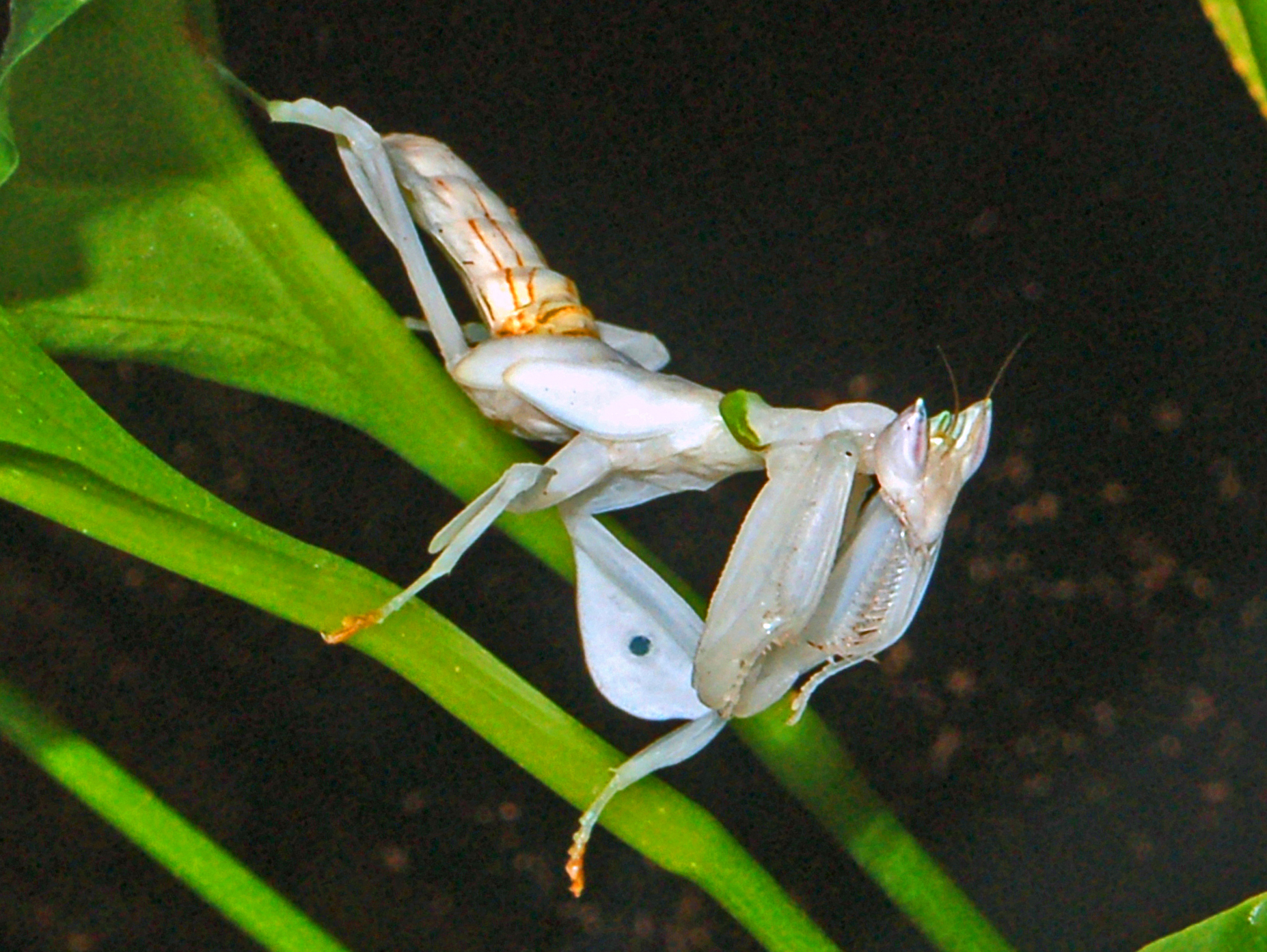
- Hymenopus coronatus

Scientific classification
- Kingdom: Animalia
- Phylum: Arthropoda
- Clade: Pancrustacea
- Class: Insecta
- Order: Mantodea
- Family: Hymenopodidae
- Tribe: Hymenopodini
- Genus: Hymenopus; Audinet-Serville, 1831

= Hymenopus =

Genus of praying mantises

Hymenopus is a small genus of mantises in the family Hymenopodidae, known for their striking resemblance to flowers. Their camouflage allows them to ambush pollinating insects such as bees and butterflies. They are found in tropical regions of Southeast Asia, including countries such as Malaysia, Indonesia, further north into Thailand (etc.), Burma and possibly neighbouring regions.

== Species ==
The genus is usually defined as only having one wide-ranging species:

- Hymenopus coronatus Manuel [in Olivier], 1797 - Southeast Asian orchid mantis [often ascribed to (Olivier, 1792)]

However, a second species was recently proposed from China, but is later rejected as a junior synonym by Delfosse, 2007.

- [?] Hymenopus coronatoides Wang, Liu & Yin, 1994

== Taxonomy ==
In much of the older literature, the alternative taxonomic binomial Hymenopus bicornis can be found (plus in older combinations), and may be misattributed as Hymenopus bicornis Latreille, 1807. However, that simply refers to Mantis bicornis Stoll, 1813 (or rather Houttuyn in Stoll, 1813), directly derived from the same original description and specimens of Mantis coronata Manuel in Olivier, 1797, and therefore the more recent junior is rejected as an objective synonym. For further context, see the entry Wikispecies
