= Exuviae =

Remains left by an arthropod molting

In biology, exuviae are the remains of an exoskeleton and related structures that are left after ecdysozoans (including insects, crustaceans and arachnids) have molted. The exuviae of an animal can be important to biologists as they can often be used to identify the species of the animal and even its sex.

As studying insects, crustaceans, or arachnids directly is not always possible, and because exuviae can be collected fairly easily, they can play an important part in helping to determine some general aspects of a species' overall life cycle such as distribution, sex ratio, production, and proof of breeding in a habitat. Exuviae have been suggested as a "gold standard" for insect monitoring. For instance, when monitoring dragonfly populations, the presence of exuviae of a species demonstrates that the species has completed its full life cycle from egg to adult in a habitat. However, it has also been suggested that the fact that exuviae can be hard to find could lead to an underestimation of insect species compared to, for example, counting adult insects.

The Latin word exuviae, meaning "things stripped from a body", is found only in the plural. Exuvia is a derived singular form, although this is a neologism, and not attested in texts by Roman authors. A few modern works use the singular noun exuvium (e.g.). Only a single historical work by Propertius uses the singular form exuvium, but in the meaning "spoils, booty".

== Gallery ==
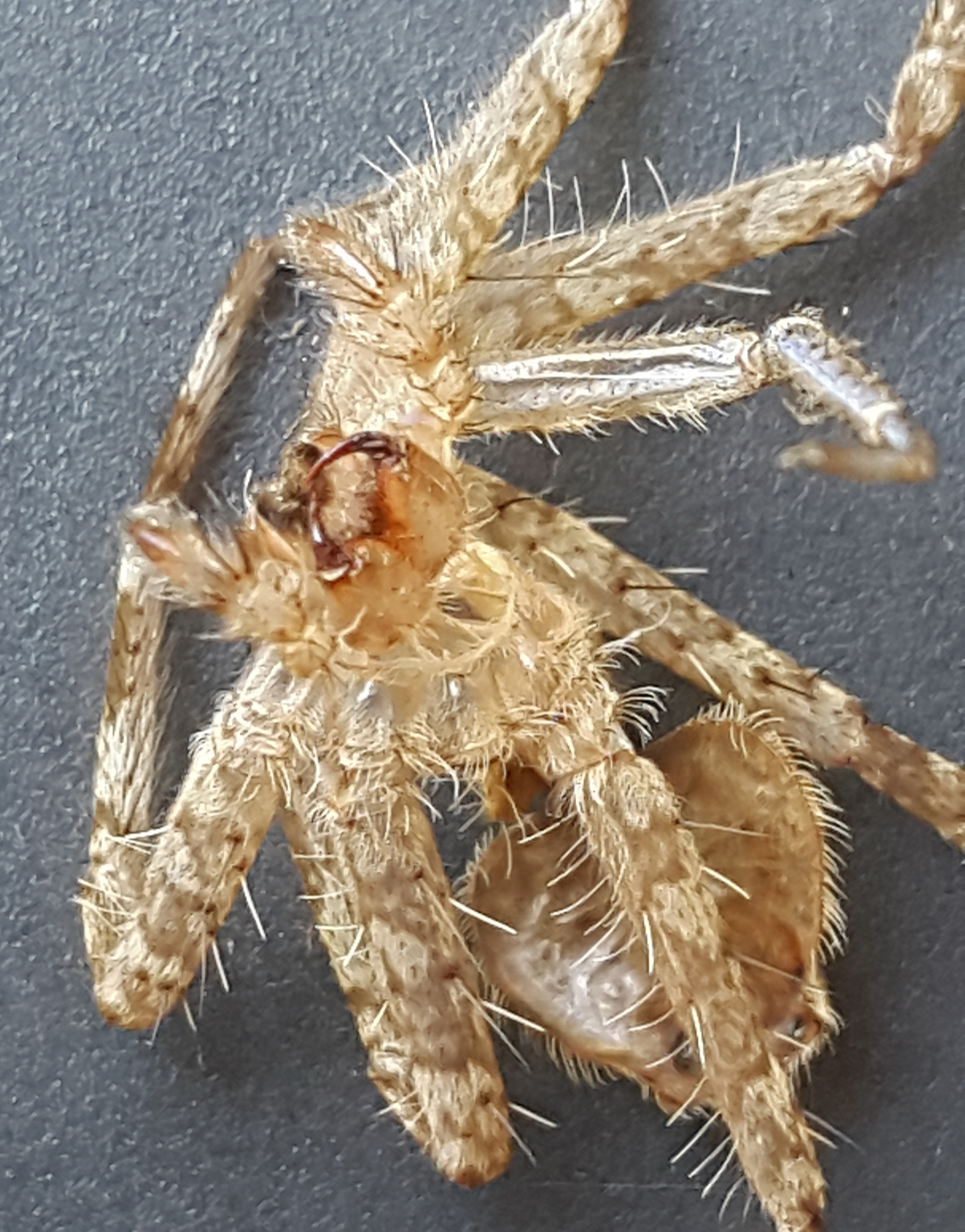
Anyphops

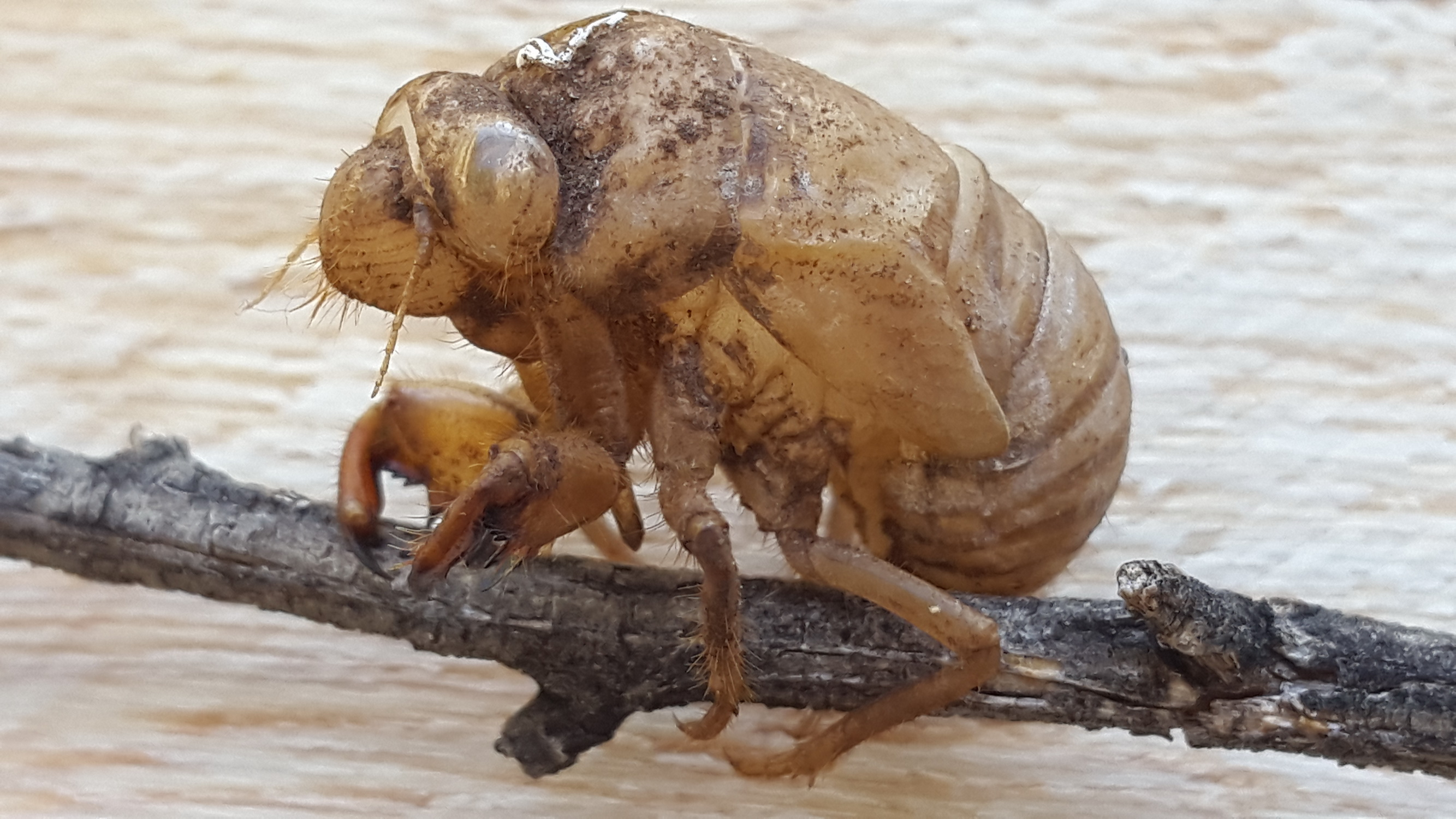
Cicada Platypleura

Accelerated view of a cicada molting

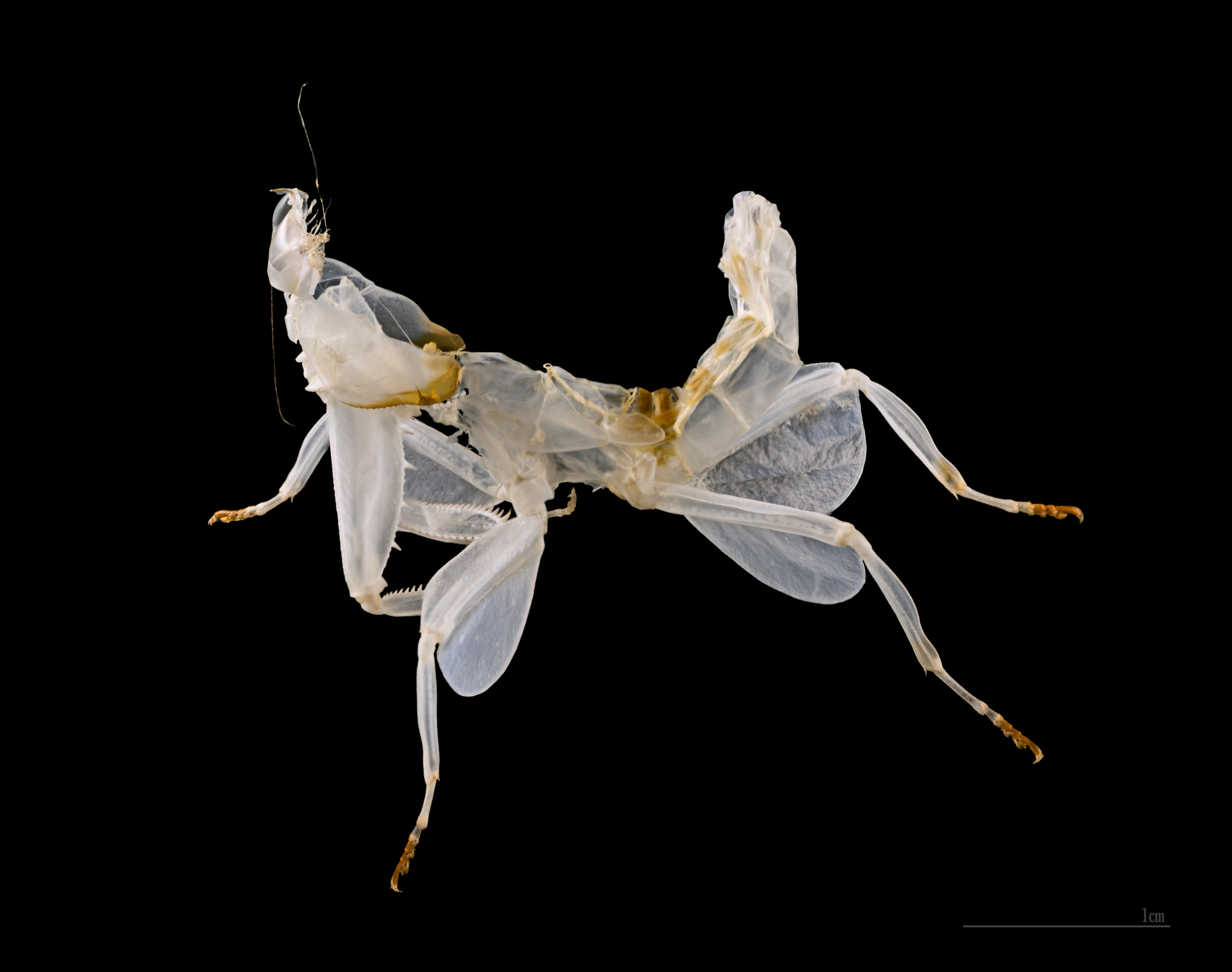
Orchid mantis

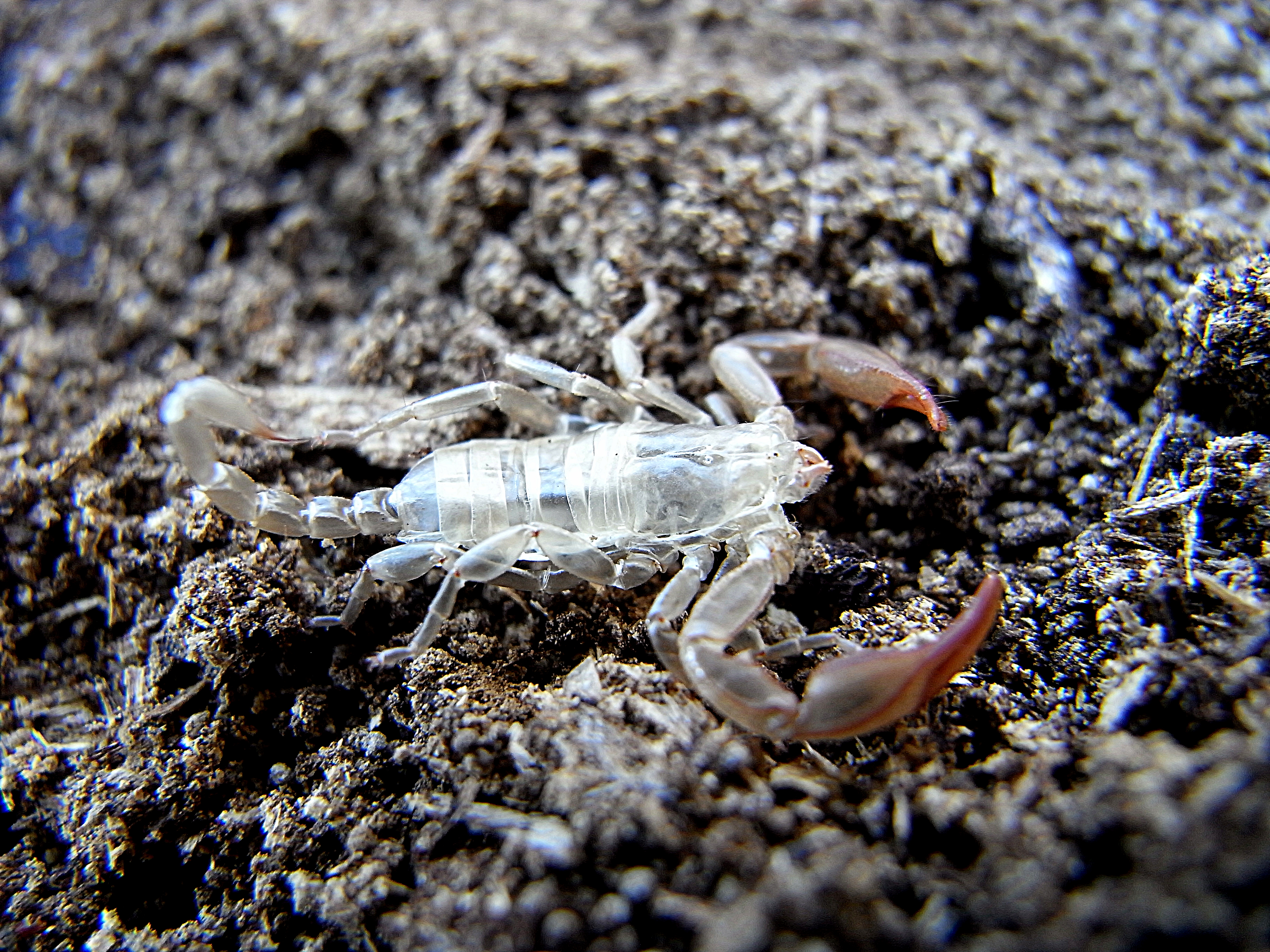
Scorpion

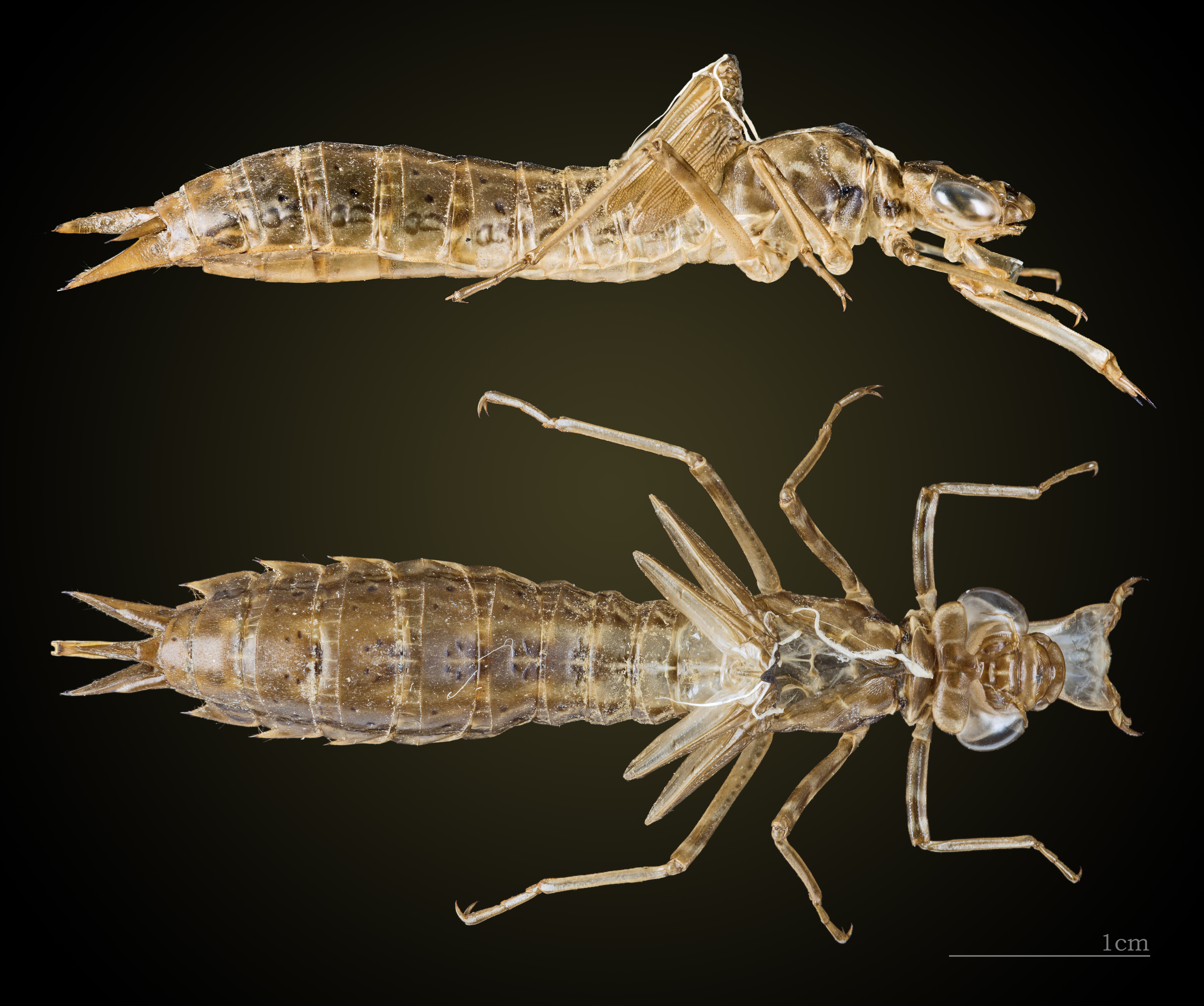
Dragonfly Anax imperator

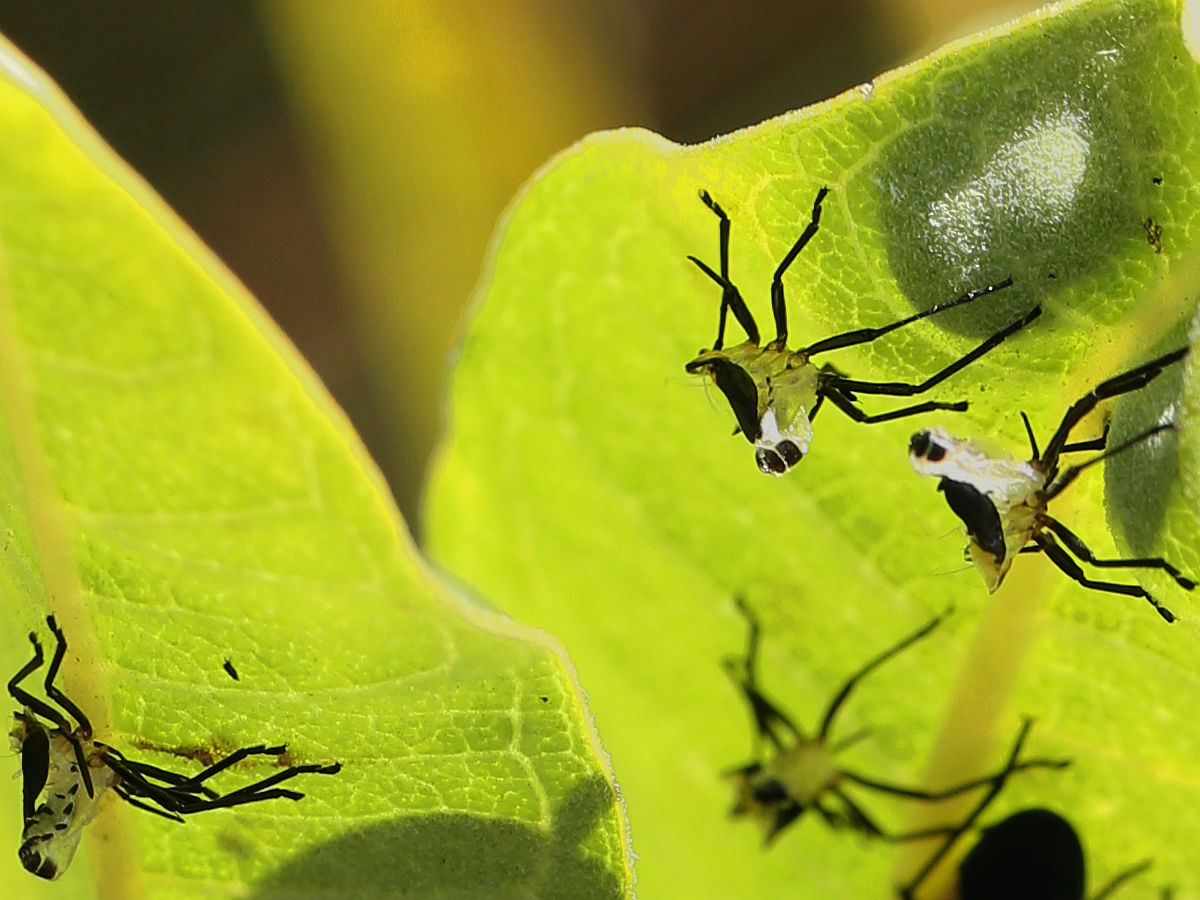
Large milkweed bug

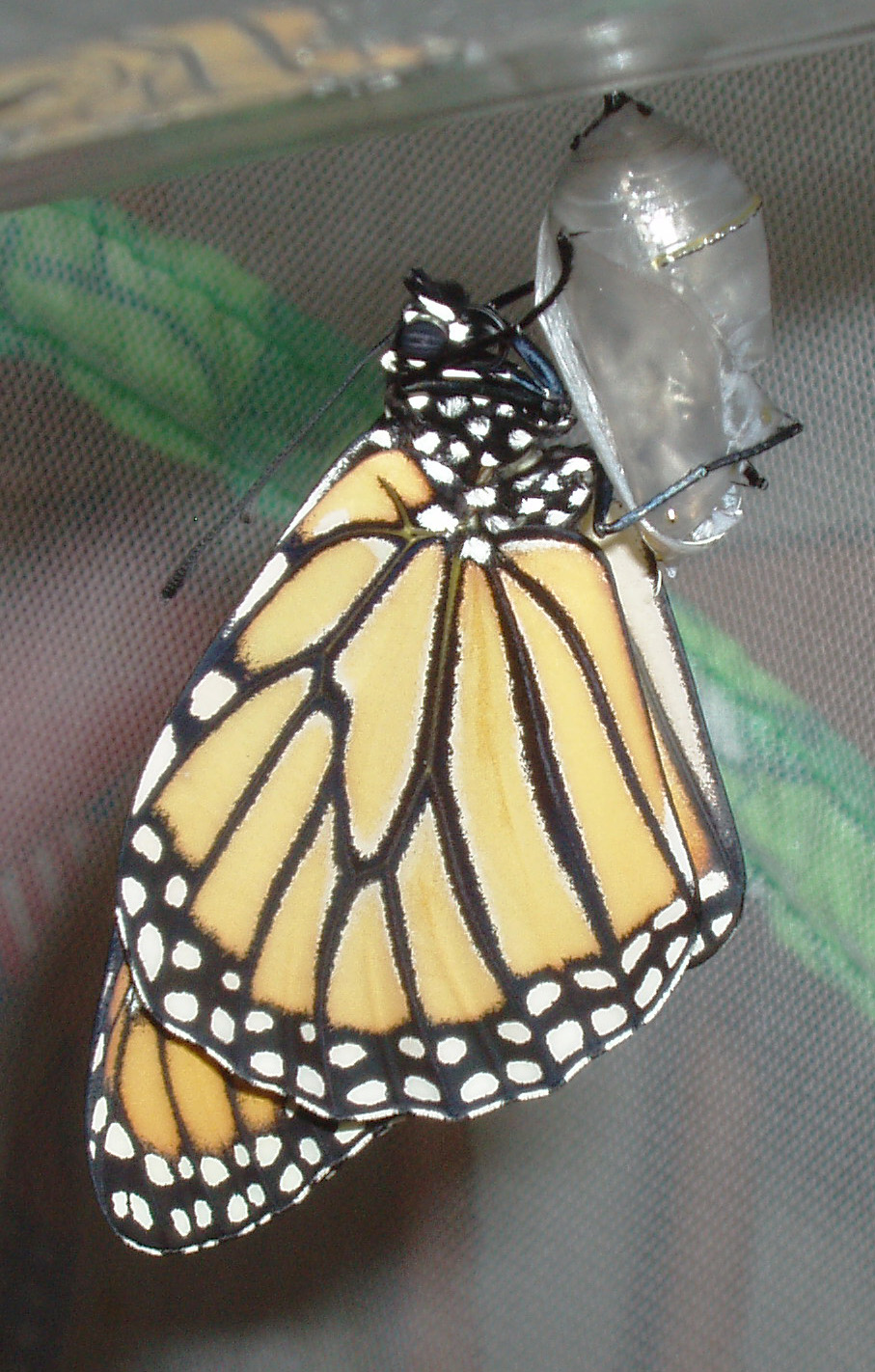
Emergent monarch butterfly clinging to exuviae
