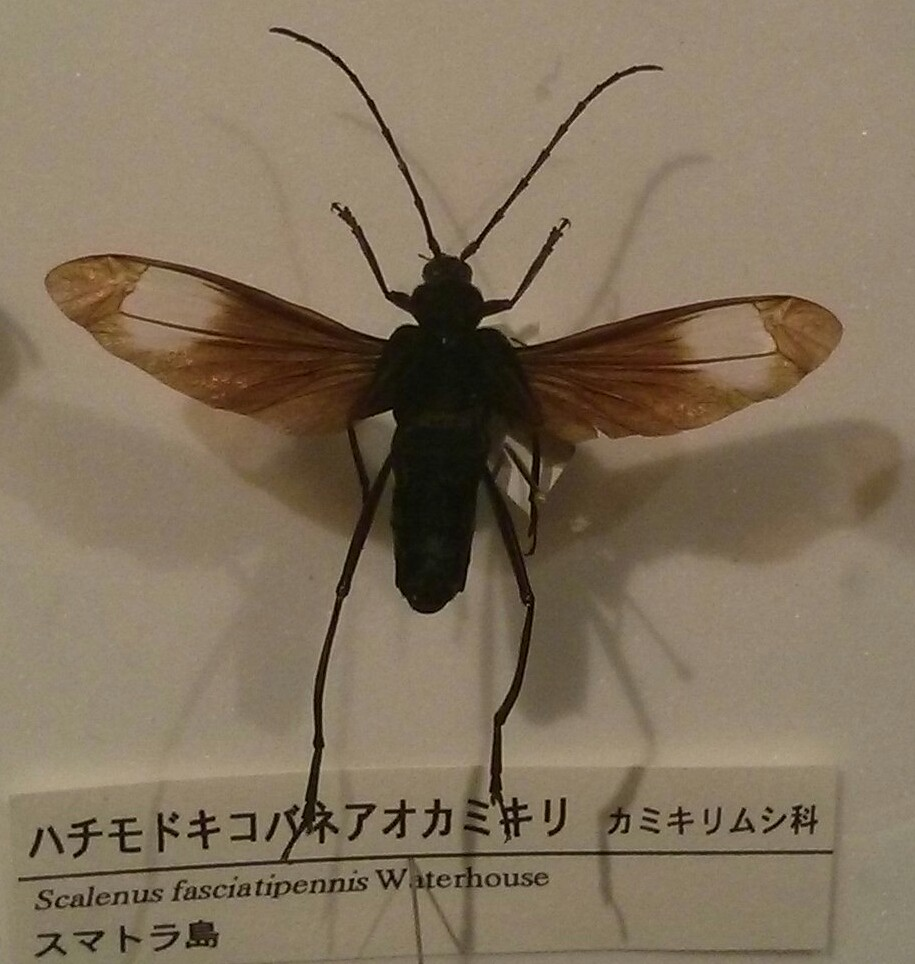
- Scalenus fasciatipennis

Scientific classification
- Kingdom: Animalia
- Phylum: Arthropoda
- Clade: Pancrustacea
- Class: Insecta
- Order: Coleoptera
- Suborder: Polyphaga
- Infraorder: Cucujiformia
- Family: Cerambycidae
- Tribe: Callichromatini
- Genus: Scalenus; Gistel, 1848

Synonyms
- Colobus Audinet-Serville, 1833 (Unav.); Coloborhombus Thomson, 1864; Nothopeus Pascoe, 1864

= Scalenus =

Genus of beetles

Scalenus is an Old World genus of round-necked longhorn beetles of the subfamily Cerambycinae. Most are Batesian mimics of wasps. The elytra are short and reduced and do not extend beyond the thorax.

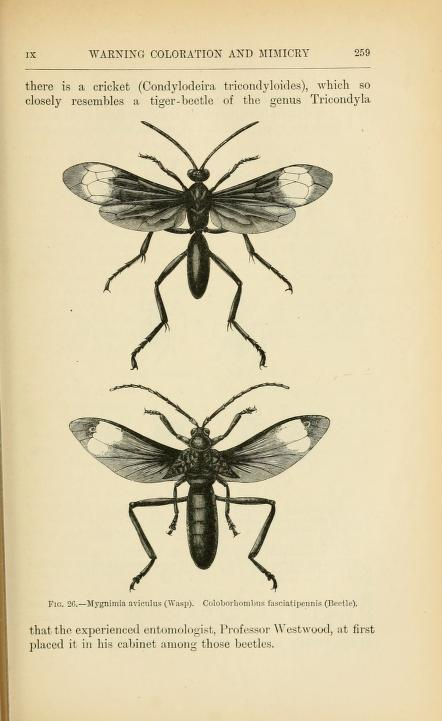
In his 1889 book Darwinism, Alfred Russel Wallace discusses Batesian mimicry with a plate of a Scalenus species (S. fasciatipennis) that closely mimics a wasp.

== Species ==
Scalenus auricomus (Ritsema, 1890)
Scalenus borneensis Bentanachs & Drouin, 2014
Scalenus cingalensis (White, 1855)
Scalenus fasciatipennis (Waterhouse, 1885)
Scalenus fulvus (Bates, 1879)
Scalenus hefferni Bentanachs & Jiroux, 2018
Scalenus hemipterus (Olivier, 1795)
Scalenus kalimantanensis Bentanachs & Jiroux, 2018
Scalenus pejchai Bentanachs & Jiroux, 2018
Scalenus philippensis Bentanachs & Drouin, 2014
Scalenus sericeus (Saunders, 1853)
Scalenus skalei Bentanachs & Jiroux, 2018

Scalenus ysmaeli Hüdepohl, 1987
