= Darwinism (book) =

1889 book by Alfred Russel Wallace

Darwinism: An Exposition of the Theory of Natural Selection with Some of Its Applications
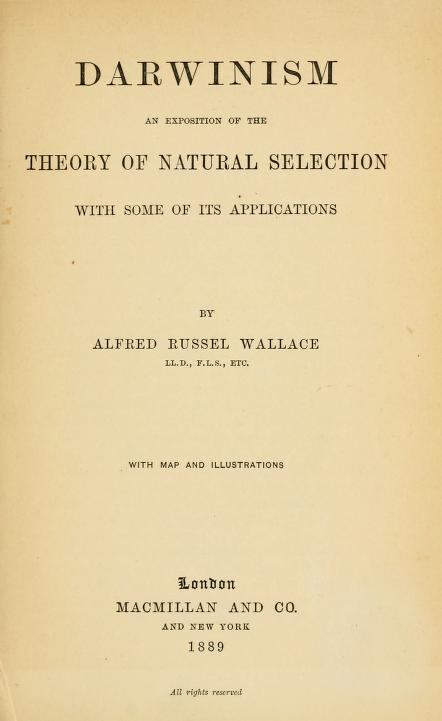
- Title page of first edition, 1889
- Author: Alfred Russel Wallace
- Language: English
- Publisher: Macmillan
- Publication date: 1889
- LC Class: QH366 .W2

Darwinism: An Exposition of the Theory of Natural Selection with Some of Its Applications is an 1889 book on evolution by Alfred Russel Wallace, the co-discoverer of evolution by natural selection together with Charles Darwin. This was a book Wallace wrote as a defensive response to the scientific critics of natural selection. Of all Wallace's books, it is the most often cited by scholarly publications. In the book, Wallace argues against other theories of evolution held by Darwin and others, including inheritance of acquired characteristics and sexual selection. The book was warmly received in contemporary Victorian era periodicals for Wallace's fusion of science and spirituality, as it suggested that evolution had an ultimate goal and purpose.

== Synopsis ==
In Darwinism's fifteen chapters, Alfred Russel Wallace sets out his understanding of the theory of evolution by natural selection. He begins by defining "species", discussing creationism, opinion before Charles Darwin, and Darwin's theory. He describes the Malthusian struggle for existence, given the ability of organisms to reproduce in a world of finite resources. He explains the importance of variability within species, giving examples. He describes variation in domesticated animals and cultivated plants, and the process of artificial selection by breeders. Wallace explains the process of natural selection acting on pre-existing variation. He lists various issues and objections to the theory. He discusses how interspecies hybrids are usually infertile, and how this can contribute to reproductive isolation. He examines the purpose of animal coloration, including camouflage and mimicry, arguing that these are evidence of natural selection. He gives detailed examples of warning coloration and mimicry, discussing how these are produced by selection. Animal coloration and ornamentation that differs between the sexes are discussed, though he largely disagrees with Darwin's theory of sexual selection. Wallace explores the co-evolution of flowers with their pollinators including insects and birds. He describes the geographical distribution of organisms, arguing that this was created by long-distance dispersal of pioneer organisms, such as insects blown across the sea. He explains the geological evidence for evolution, the fossil record in successive layers of rock. He examines objections to Darwinism concerning variation and heredity. Finally, he looks at how Darwinism may apply to humans.

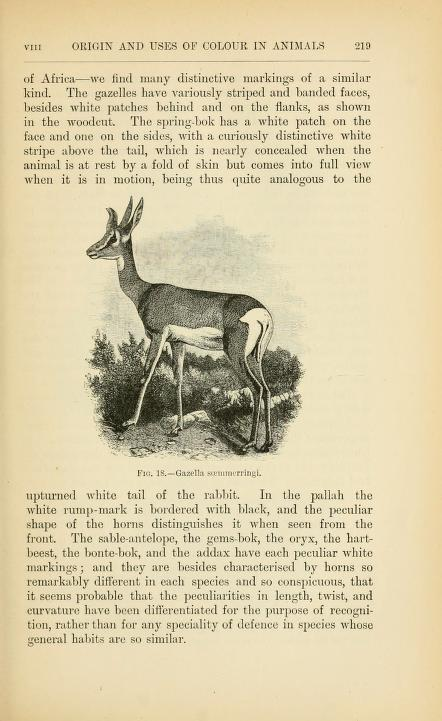
Wallace discusses the purposes of herbivore coloration as danger and recognition signals, with an illustration of Soemmerring's gazelle.

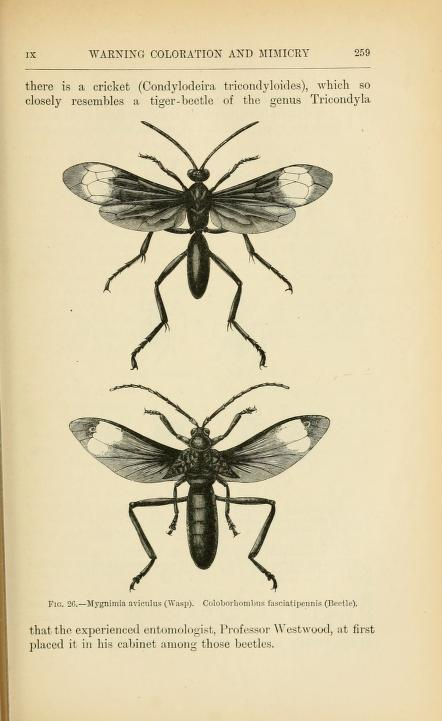
Wallace discusses Batesian mimicry with a plate of a beetle that closely mimics a wasp.

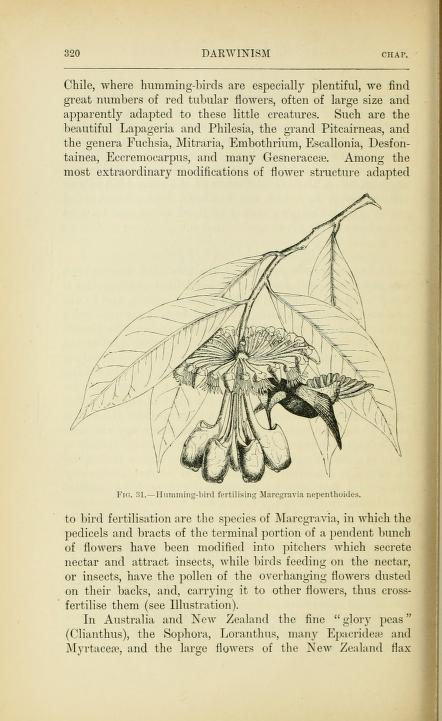
Wallace discusses the coevolution of flowers and pollinators, illustrating it with a bird-pollinated flower.

== Analysis ==
=== Scientific ===
Wallace denied that sexual dimorphism in the peafowl was caused by sexual selection, offering separate explanations for the male and the female.

Wallace wrote Darwinism as a defensive response to the scientific critics of natural selection. In the preface, Wallace had used the term pure-Darwinism which proposed a "greater efficacy" for natural selection. The book is notable for defending August Weismann's theory of heredity and rejecting the increasingly popular inheritance of acquired characteristics (Lamarckism) and the concept of sexual selection which Darwin had proposed. Instead, Wallace offered non-sexual explanations for some of the examples that Darwin had given. For instance, Wallace argued that female birds had dull coloration for camouflage from predators, whereas males had bright coloration to attract predators away from the nest, so that natural selection was the explanation in both cases.

George Romanes wrote a hostile review of the book, offering rebuttals of Wallace's views on both Lamarckism and sexual selection. Romanes later dubbed the theory presented in the book "Wallaceism" (as Frederick Hutton had suggested in a letter), writing that in contrast to Darwin, this position was advocating a "pure theory of natural selection to the exclusion of any supplementary theory." The book has been seen as laying the foundation for the neo-Darwinian theory of evolution. Of all Wallace's books, Darwinism is the one most often cited by scholarly publications up to the 21st century.

=== Spiritual ===
Ian Hesketh argues in Journal of Victorian Culture that Wallace was seeking to reshape Darwin's theory into a "teleological evolutionism", combining natural selection with the spiritual view that evolution had an ultimate goal and purpose. Hesketh suggests that this made evolution more congenial to people of the Victorian era, and states that the book was accordingly received "with great enthusiasm" by contemporary newspaper reviewers.

In 1889, the Canadian populariser of science Grant Allen praised Wallace for his modesty in not stating his role in the discovery of natural selection in the book. Hesketh writes that this was seen as consistent with his character, noting the bishop and scholar Harvey Goodwin's remark the following year that this "struck [him] with a feeling of reverence" towards Wallace's "complete devotion to the cause of science and truth".

== Sources ==
- Wallace, Alfred Russel (1889). Darwinism: An Exposition of the Theory of Natural Selection, with Some of Its Applications. Macmillan and Company.
