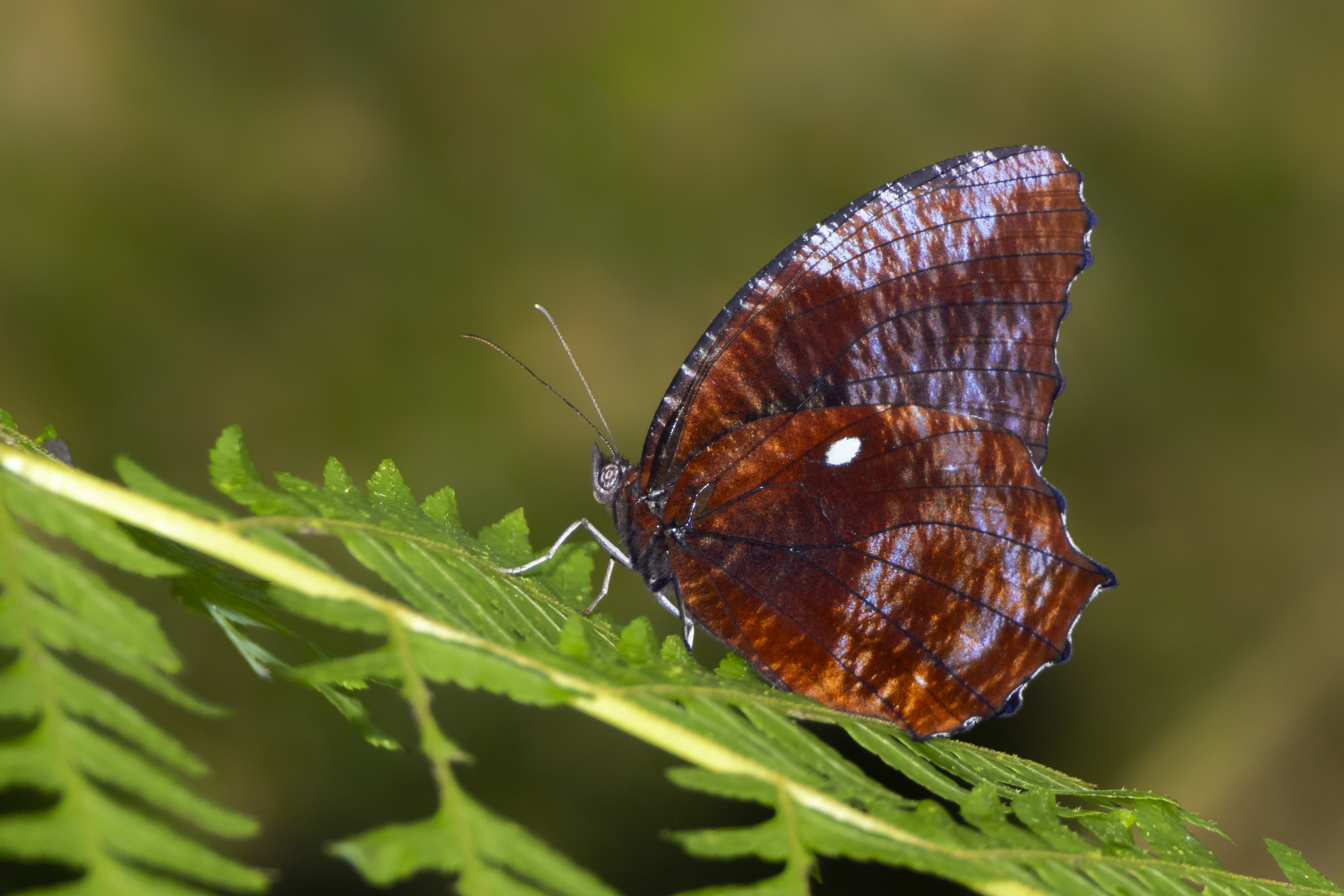

Scientific classification
- Kingdom: Animalia
- Phylum: Arthropoda
- Clade: Pancrustacea
- Class: Insecta
- Order: Lepidoptera
- Family: Nymphalidae
- Genus: Elymnias
- Species: E. pealii

Binomial name
- Elymnias pealii Wood-Mason, 1883

= Elymnias pealii =

Species of butterfly

Elymnias pealii, also commonly known as the phallic palmfly, is a species of butterfly that belongs to the family Nymphalidae. It is endemic to the Indian state Assam in the Indomalayan realm.

It was described by James Wood-Mason in 1883. Within its genus, it is the only member of the Elymnias patna species group (besides E. patna).
