= Ramulus westwoodii =

Scientific classification
- Kingdom: Animalia
- Phylum: Arthropoda
- Class: Insecta
- Order: Phasmatodea
- Family: Phasmatidae
- Subfamily: Clitumninae
- Tribe: Clitumnini
- Genus: Ramulus
- Species: R. westwoodii

Binomial name
- Ramulus westwoodii (Wood-Mason, 1873)

Synonyms
- Cuniculina westwoodii (Wood-Mason, 1873); Baculum westwoodii (Wood-Mason, 1873); Lonchodes westwoodii (Wood-Mason, 1873); Bacillus westwoodii (Wood-Mason, 1873)

Species of stick insect

Ramulus westwoodii is a species of stick insect first described by James Wood-Mason in 1873 and named in honour of John O. Westwood.
