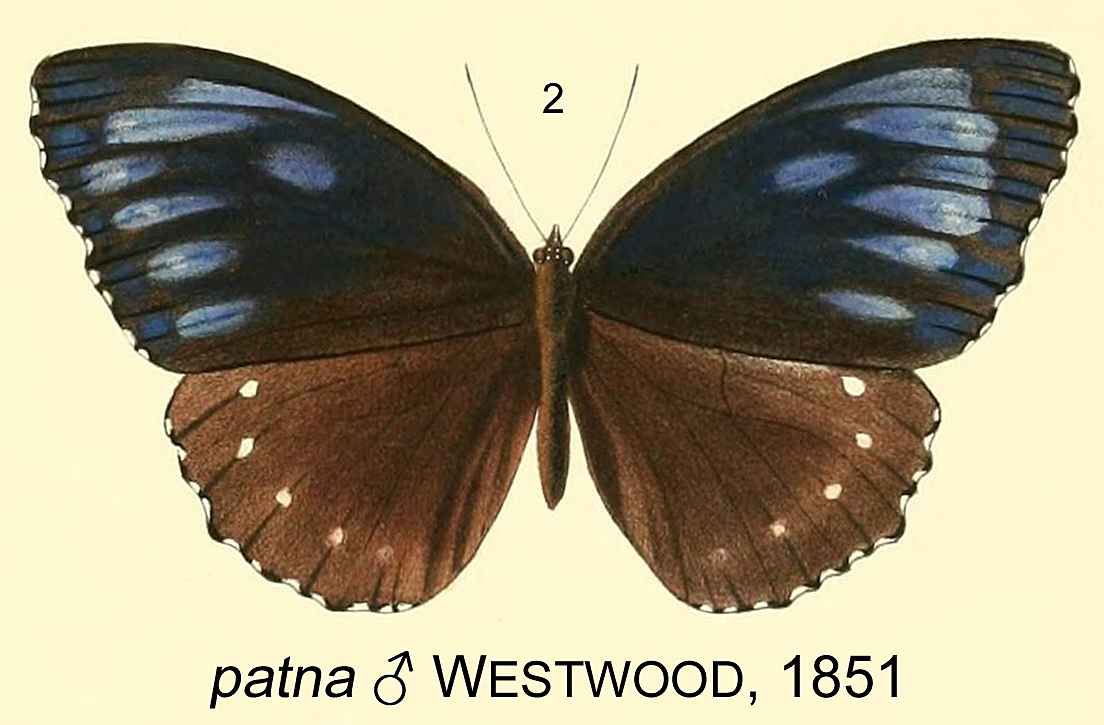

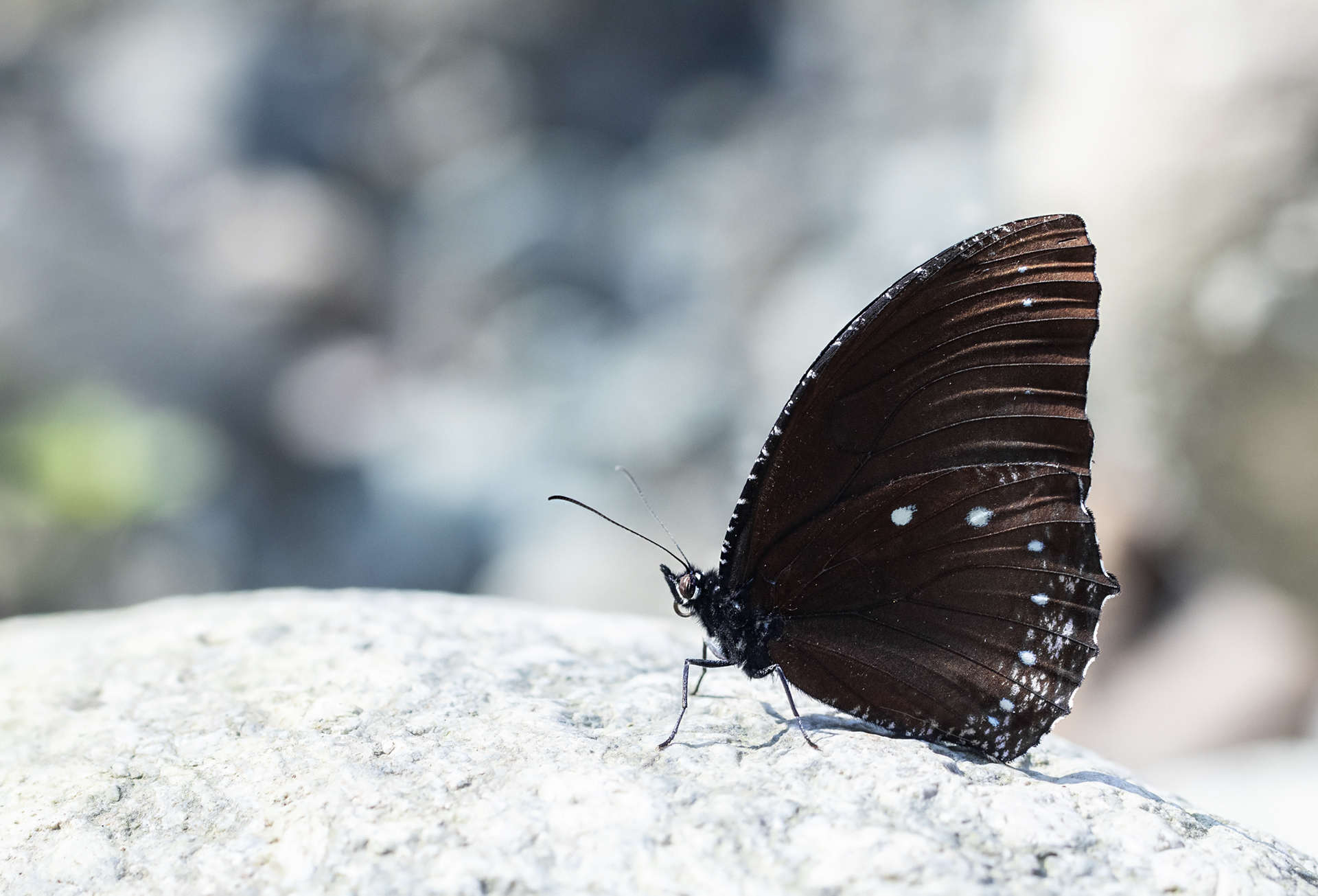

Scientific classification
- Kingdom: Animalia
- Phylum: Arthropoda
- Clade: Pancrustacea
- Class: Insecta
- Order: Lepidoptera
- Family: Nymphalidae
- Genus: Elymnias
- Species: E. patna

Binomial name
- Elymnias patna (Westwood, 1851)

Synonyms
- Melanitis patna Westwood, 1851; Elymnias patna bercovitzi Joicey & Talbot, 1921; Melynias patnoides Moore, 1893; Elymnias hanitschi Martin, 1909; Elymnias (Melynias) dohrnii de Nicéville, 1895

= Elymnias patna =

Species of butterfly

Elymnias patna, also known as the blue-striped palmfly, is a species of butterfly that belongs to the family Nymphalidae. It is found in the Indomalayan realm.

== Taxonomy ==
This species was described by John Obadiah Westwood in 1851. It, along with Elymnias pealii makes the E. patna species group.

=== Subspecies ===
As of May 2026, this species contains five subspecies. They are listed below along with their known range:

- Elymnias patna dohrni de Nicéville, 1895 (northern Sumatra)
- Elymnias patna hanitchi Martin, 1909 (Peninsular Malaysia)
- Elymnias patna patna (Westwood, 1851) (north-western India to Assam, Burma, possibly Thailand)
- Elymnias patna patnoides (Moore, 1893) (Burma)
- Elymnias patna stictica Fruhstorfer, 1902 (northern Indochina)
