= James Wood-Mason =

English zoologist

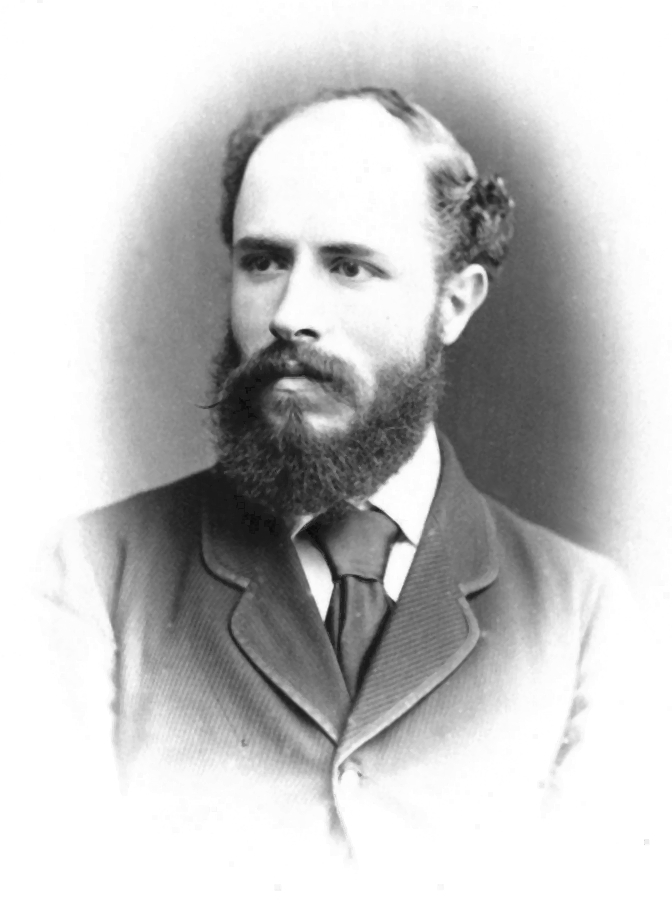
- Portrait of Professor Wood-Mason by Bourne & Shepherd (1876)
- Born: December 1846; Gloucestershire
- Died: 6 May 1893 (aged 47); At sea
- Education: Queen's College, Oxford
- Known for: Phasmids and Mantises
- Scientific career
- Fields: Entomology
- Workplaces: Indian Museum, Calcutta
- Doctoral advisor: J.O. Westwood

James Wood-Mason (December 1846 – 6 May 1893) was an English zoologist. He was the director of the Indian Museum at Calcutta, after John Anderson. He collected marine animals and lepidoptera, but is best known for his work on two other groups of insects, phasmids (stick insects) and mantises (praying mantises).

The genus Woodmasonia Brunner, 1907, and at least ten species of phasmids, are named after him.

== Life and career ==
Wood-Mason was born in Gloucestershire, England, where his father was a doctor. He was educated at Charterhouse School and Queen's College, Oxford. He went out to India in 1869 to work in the Indian Museum, Calcutta, which in 2008 still housed his collection of insects.

In 1872 he sailed to the Andaman Islands, mostly studying marine animals, but also collecting and later describing two new phasmids, Bacillus hispidulus and Bacillus westwoodii.

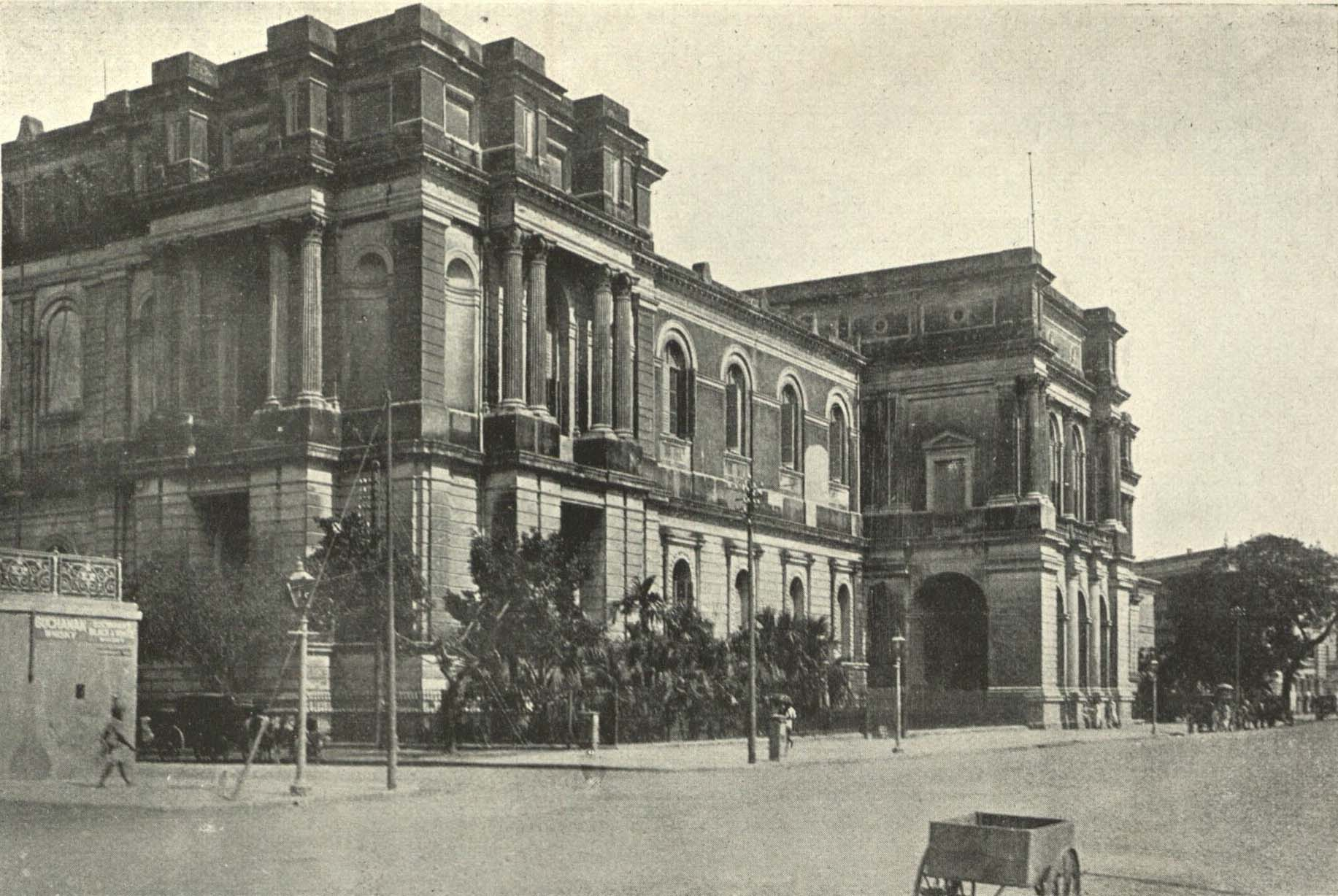
The Indian Museum, Calcutta, where Wood-Mason was superintendent from 1887

Wood-Mason described 24 new species of phasmids, mostly from South Asia but also some from Australia, New Britain, Madagascar, the Malay peninsula and Fiji. His naming of Cotylosoma dipneusticum (Wood-Mason, 1878) is particularly curious as he never formally described the species; it was wrongly imagined to be semi-aquatic; it was "described with what is probably the least precise measurement ever used for a phasmid", namely ""between three and four inches in length"; and he gave its locality as Borneo, when in fact it came from Fiji.

In 1887 he became Superintendent of the Indian Museum. Also in 1887, he became vice-president of the Asiatic Society of Bengal.

In 1888 he sailed on the Indian Marine Survey steamship HMS Investigator, working on and later describing new species of Crustacea, along with Alfred William Alcock, who recorded the voyage in his classic natural history book A Naturalist in Indian Seas (1902).

For several years he suffered from Bright's disease. On 5 April 1893, unable to work, he left India for England, but died at sea on 6 May 1893.

=== Flower mantis drawing ===
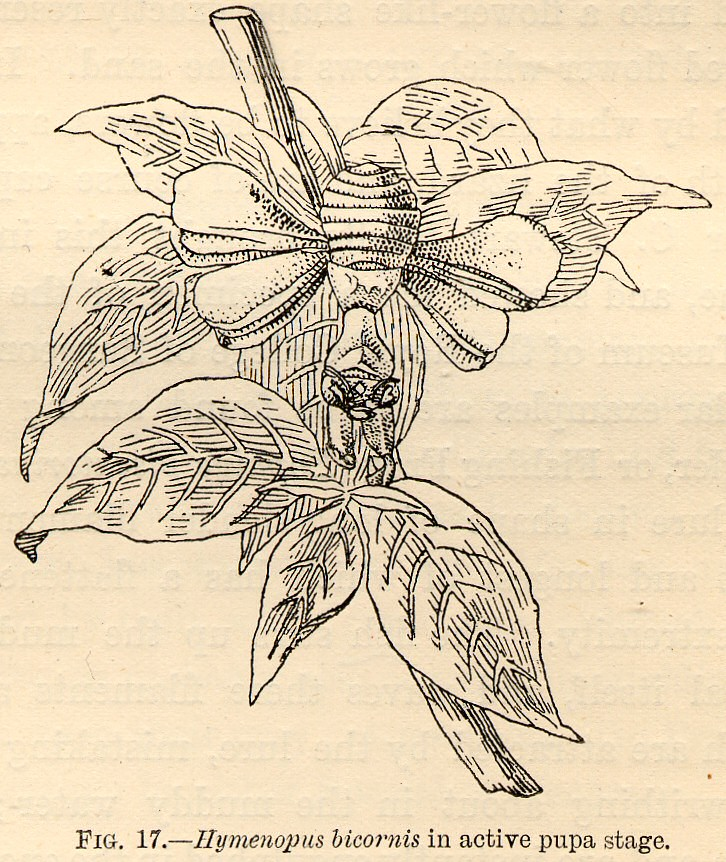
Drawing of nymph of the flower mantis Hymenopus bicornis by James Wood-Mason, 1889

Wood-Mason gave his flower mantis drawing to Alfred Russel Wallace, who wrote in his 1889 book Darwinism:

A beautiful drawing of this rare insect, Hymenopus bicornis (in the nymph or active pupa state), was kindly sent me by Mr. Wood-Mason, Curator of the Indian Museum at Calcutta. A species, very similar to it, inhabits Java, where it is said to resemble a pink orchid. Other Mantidae, of the genus Gongylus, have the anterior part of the thorax dilated and coloured either white, pink, or purple; and they so closely resemble flowers that, according to Mr. Wood-Mason, one of them, having a bright violet-blue prothoracic shield, was found in Pegu by a botanist, and was for a moment mistaken by him for a flower. See Proc. Ent. Soc. Lond., 1878, p. liii.

— Alfred Russel Wallace

Wallace passed the drawing to Edward Bagnall Poulton, who published it in his 1890 book The Colours of Animals.

== Honours ==
Wood-Mason was a Fellow of the Royal Entomological Society. In 1888 he became a Fellow of the University of Calcutta.

Over 10 marine animals have the specific name woodmasoni in his honour, including several described by Alcock of the Investigator : Heterocarpus woodmasoni, Coryphaenoides woodmasoni, Thalamita woodmasoni, and Rectopalicus woodmasoni.

Two species of snake are named in his honour: Oligodon woodmasoni and Uropeltis woodmasoni.

== Publications ==
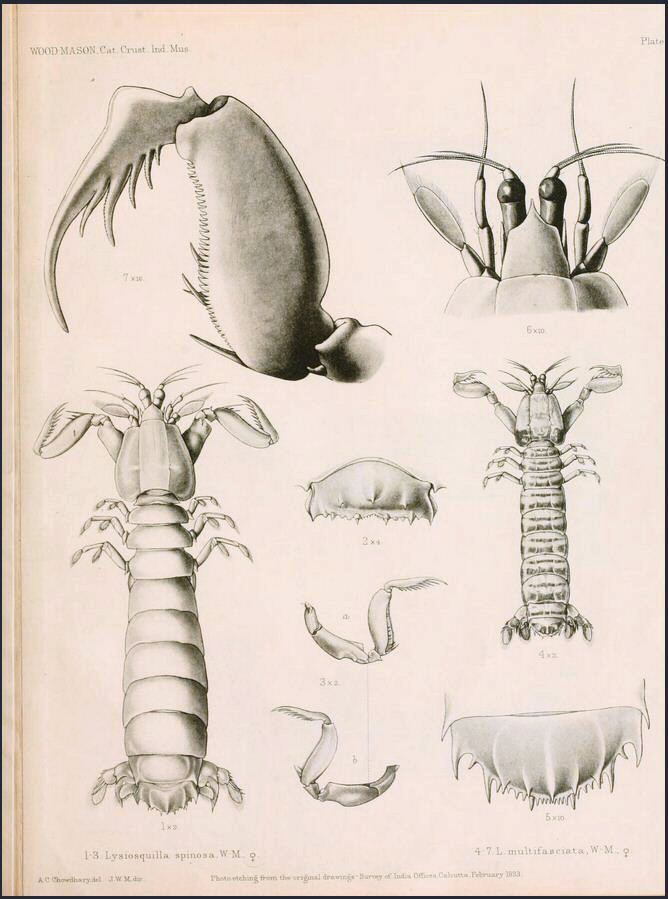
Illustration of Squillidae, including at left what is now Heterosquilla tricarinata by James Wood-Mason

- Entomological Notes. 1. On the difference in the form of the Antennae between the Males of Idolomorpha and those of other genera of Empusidae, a subfamily of Mantidae. Transactions of the Royal Entomological Society of London, Volume 26, Issue 4, pages 259–270, December 1878.
- List of the lepidopterous insects collected in Cachar by Mr. Wood-Mason, by J. Wood-Mason and Lionel de Nicéville. Baptist Mission Press, Calcutta, 1887. (53 p., 4 leaves of plates: ill. (one col.)) Reprinted from the Journal of the Asiatic Society of Bengal; 55 pt.2 no.4 (1886).
- A Catalogue of the Mantodea, with descriptions of new genera and species, and an enumeration of the specimens. Printed by order of the Trustees of the Indian Museum, 1889.
- On the uterine villiform papillae of Pteroplataea micrura, and their relation to the embryo, being natural history notes from H.M. Indian marine survey ... R.F. Hoskyn, R.N., commanding. Harrison and Sons, 1891.
- Further observations on the gestation of Indian rays: Being natural history notes from H.M. Indian marine survey steamer 'Investigator', Commander R.F. Hoskyn, R.N., commanding. Harrison and Sons, 1892.
- Figures and Descriptions of Nine Species of Squillidae from the collection in the Indian Museum. Calcutta. Published by order of the trustees of the Indian Museum, 1895.

== Sources ==
- Alcock, AW (1893). "Obituary of James Wood-Mason". Proceedings of the Asiatic Society of Bengal: 110–113.
- Anon (1893). "[Obituary of Professor Wood-Mason]". Proceedings of the Entomological Society of London: lvi.
- Bragg, PE (2008). "Biographies of Phasmatologists – 7. James Wood-Mason". Phasmid Studies. 17 (1): 1–7.
- Poulton, Edward Bagnall (1890). The Colours of Animals: Their Meaning and Use, Especially Considered in the Case of Insects. Kegan Paul, Trench, Trübner. pp. 74–75.
- Wallace, Alfred Russel (1889). Darwinism: An Exposition of the Theory of Natural Selection, with Some of Its Applications . Macmillan – via Wikisource.
