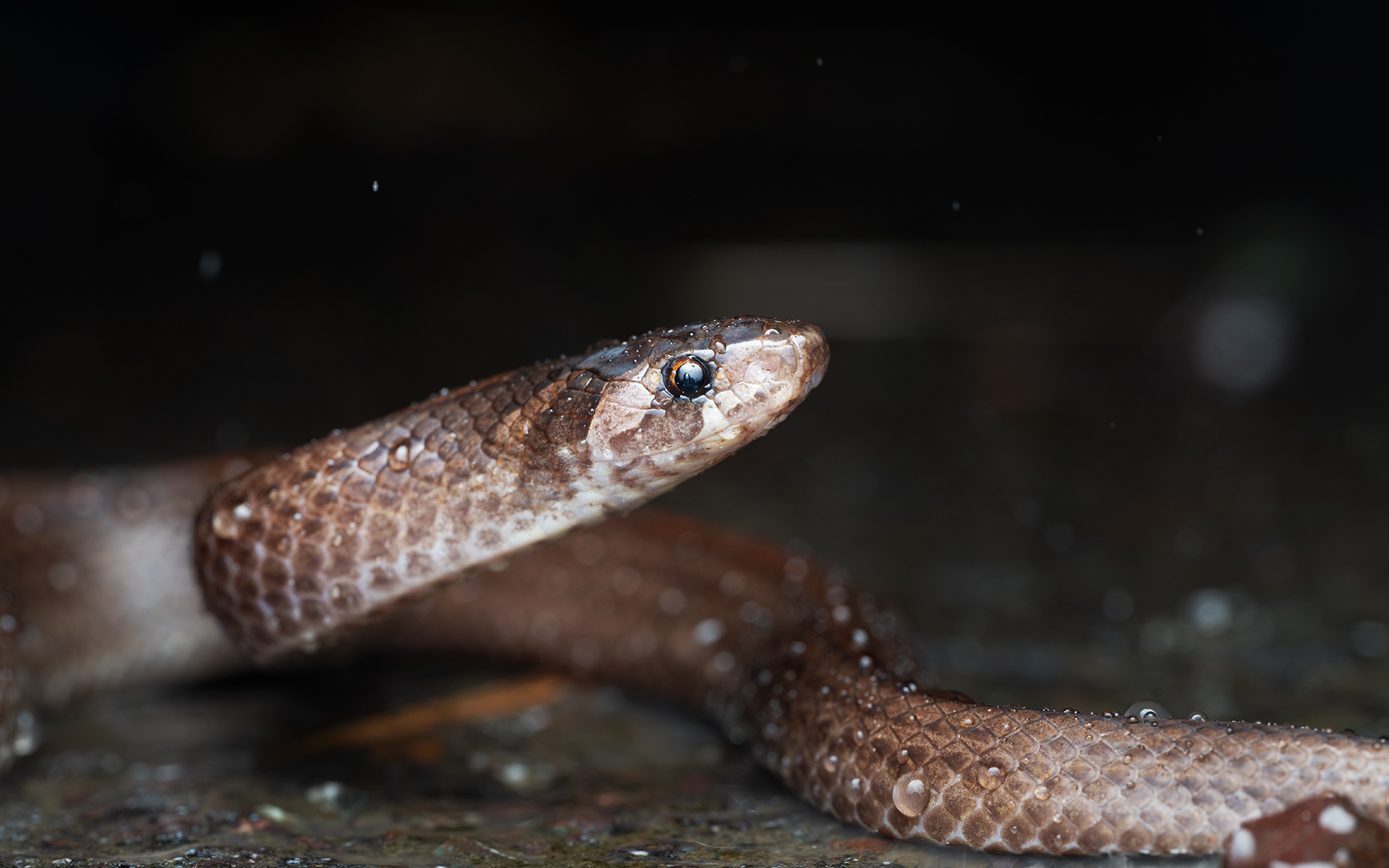

Conservation status
- Near Threatened (IUCN 3.1)

Scientific classification
- Kingdom: Animalia
- Phylum: Chordata
- Class: Reptilia
- Order: Squamata
- Suborder: Serpentes
- Family: Colubridae
- Genus: Oligodon
- Species: O. woodmasoni

Binomial name
- Oligodon woodmasoni (Sclater, 1891)

Synonyms
- Simotes wood-masoni Sclater, 1891; Oligodon woodmasoni — Wall, 1923; Oligodon woodmasoni — Wallach et al., 2014

= Oligodon woodmasoni =

Species of snake

Oligodon woodmasoni, the yellow-striped kukri snake, is a species of snake in the family Colubridae. The species is endemic to the Nicobar Islands of India.

== Etymology ==
The specific name, woodmasoni, is in honor of English zoologist James Wood-Mason.

== Description ==
M.A. Smith reported that the holotype of this species was missing from the ZSI Kolkata collections. The species was rediscovered in 2002 and a new specimen was deposited at the ZSI.

The details of the specimen, ZSI25503 are as follows:

Snout-to-vent length: 440 mm (17 in). Tail length: 80 mm (3.1 in).
Dorsal scale rows: at neck 18; at midbody 17.
Ventrals: 185. Subcaudals: 46.
Supralabials: 6 (4th in contact with the eye). Infralabials: 7.

== Reproduction ==
O. woodmasoni is oviparous.
