= Indian Museum =

Museum in Kolkata, West Bengal, India, Asia

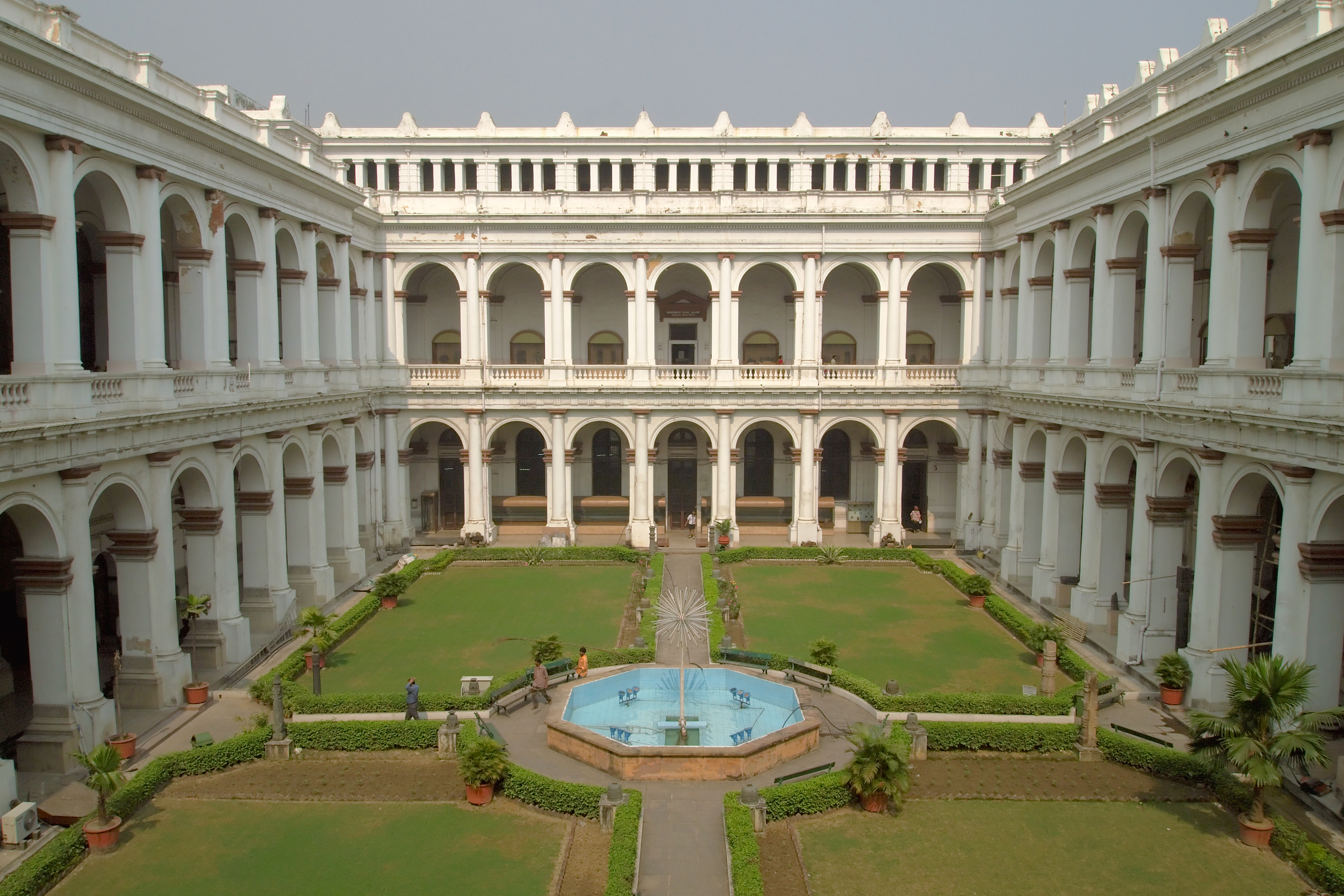
- The courtyard of the Indian Museum
- Established: 2 February 1814; 212 years ago
- Location: 27, Chowringhee Road, Park Street, Kolkata - 700016
- Coordinates: 22°33′29″N 88°21′03″E
- Type: Museum
- Collection size: 2.5 million
- Director: Dr. Sayan Bhattacharya
- Public transit access: Park Street
- Website: indianmuseumkolkata.org

The Indian Museum (formerly called Imperial Museum of Calcutta) is a grand museum in Central Kolkata, West Bengal, India. It is the ninth oldest museum in the world and the oldest, as well as the largest museum in Asia, by size of collection. It has rare collections of antiques, armour and ornaments, fossils, skeletons, mummies and Mughal paintings. It was founded by the Asiatic Society of Bengal in Kolkata (Calcutta), India, in 1814. The founder curator was Nathaniel Wallich, a Danish botanist.

It has six sections comprising thirty five galleries of cultural and scientific artifacts namely Indian art, archaeology, anthropology, geology, zoology and economic botany. Many rare and unique specimens, both Indian and trans-Indian, relating to humanities and natural sciences, are preserved and displayed in the galleries of these sections. In particular the art and archaeology sections hold collections of international importance.

It is an autonomous organization under the Ministry of Culture, Government of India. The present Director of the Indian Museum is Dr. Sayan Bhattacharya, the youngest-ever to head the centuries-old museum.

== History ==
The Indian Museum originated from the Asiatic Society of Bengal which was created by Sir William Jones in 1784. The concept of having a museum arose in 1796 from members of the Asiatic Society as a place where man-made and natural objects collected could be kept, cared for and displayed.

The objective began to look achievable in 1808 when the Society was offered suitable accommodation by the Government of India in the Chowringhee-Park Street area.

On 2 February 1814, Nathaniel Wallich, a Danish botanist, who had been captured in the siege of Serampore but later released, wrote to the council of the Asiatic Society for the formation of a museum out of his own collection and that of the Asiatic Society in Calcutta, volunteering his service as a Curator wherein he proposed five sections—an archaeological, ethnological, a technical section and a geological and zoological one. The council readily agreed and the Museum was created, with Wallich named the Honorary Curator and then Superintendent of the Oriental Museum of the Asiatic Society. Wallich also donated a number of botanical specimens to the museum from his personal collection. In 1815, Mr William Lloyd Gibbons, Asst Secretary and Librarian, was appointed Joint Secretary of the Museum.

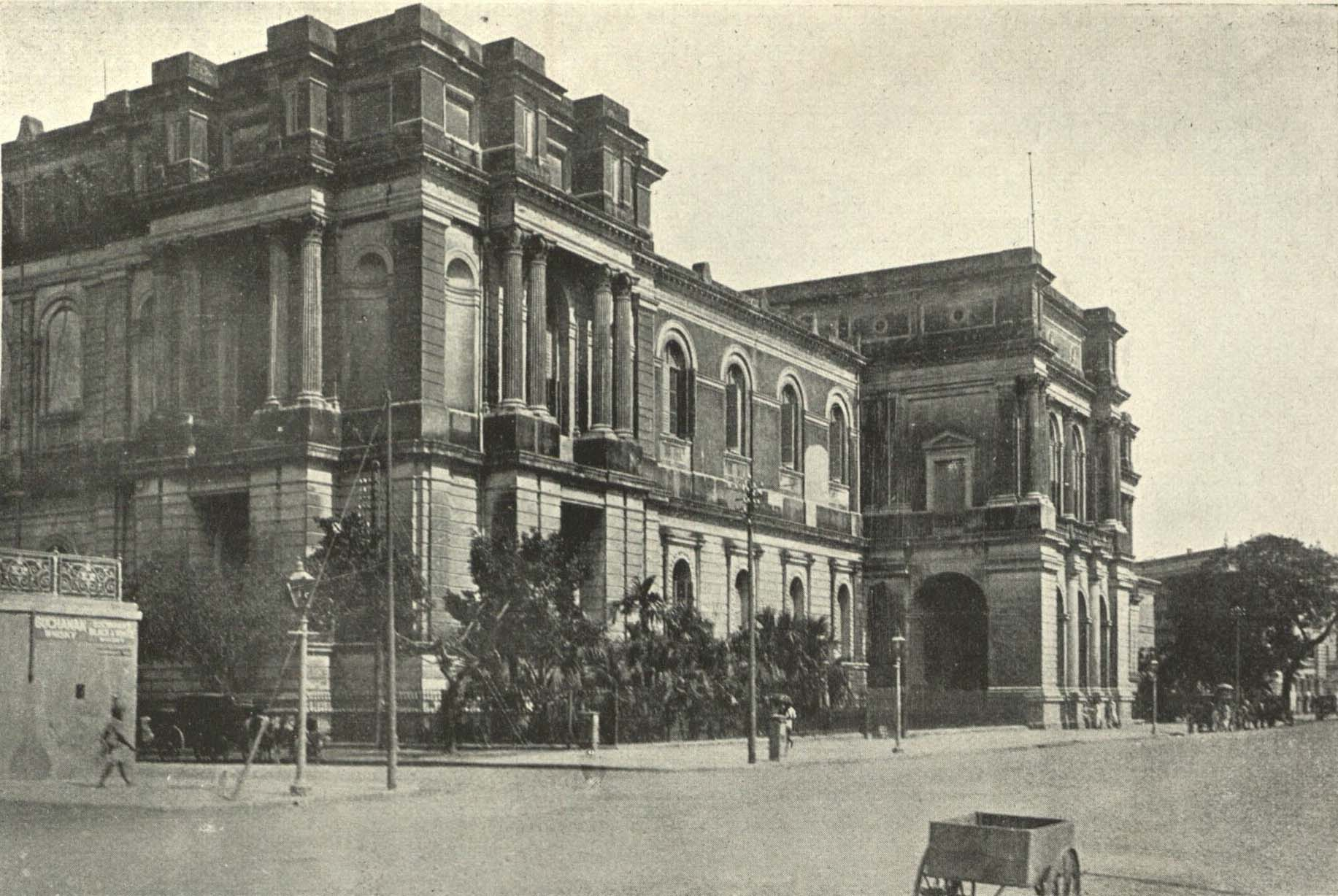
The Indian Museum, as completed in 1875, photo c. 1905

After the resignation of Wallich, curators were paid salaries by the Asiatic Society ranging from Rs 50 to Rs 200 a month. However, in 1836, when the bankers of the Asiatic Society (Palmer and Company) became insolvent, the Government began to pay the salary of the Curator from its public funds since a large part of the collection was that of the surveyors of Survey of India.

A temporary grant of Rs 200 per month was sanctioned for maintenance of the museum and library, and J. T. Pearson of the Bengal Medical Service was appointed curator, followed shortly by John McClelland and, after the former's resignation, by Edward Blyth.

In 1840, the Government took a keen interest in geology and mineral resources, and this led to an additional grant of Rs 250 per month for the geological section alone. In 1851 when the Geological Survey of India came into being with the advent of Sir Thomas Oldham, a rented building at 1, Hastings Road now K N Roy Road, the present site of the New Secretariat became its office. The geological collection of the Government of India 'Museum of Economic Geology' at the Asiatic Society, were then transferred to this site in 1856. The Asiatic Society geological collection were however held back with the condition that it would be handed over to the GSI once a Museum for all its collection came into being. It was way back in 1837 that Sir James Princeps, then-Secretary of the Asiatic Society, had written to the Government asking for a Museum paid for by the state. A movement for a full-fledged Museum was thereafter keenly pursued over a decade, and later, with Sir Thomas Oldham, then Superintendent of the Geological Survey of India, at the helm, it gained momentum.

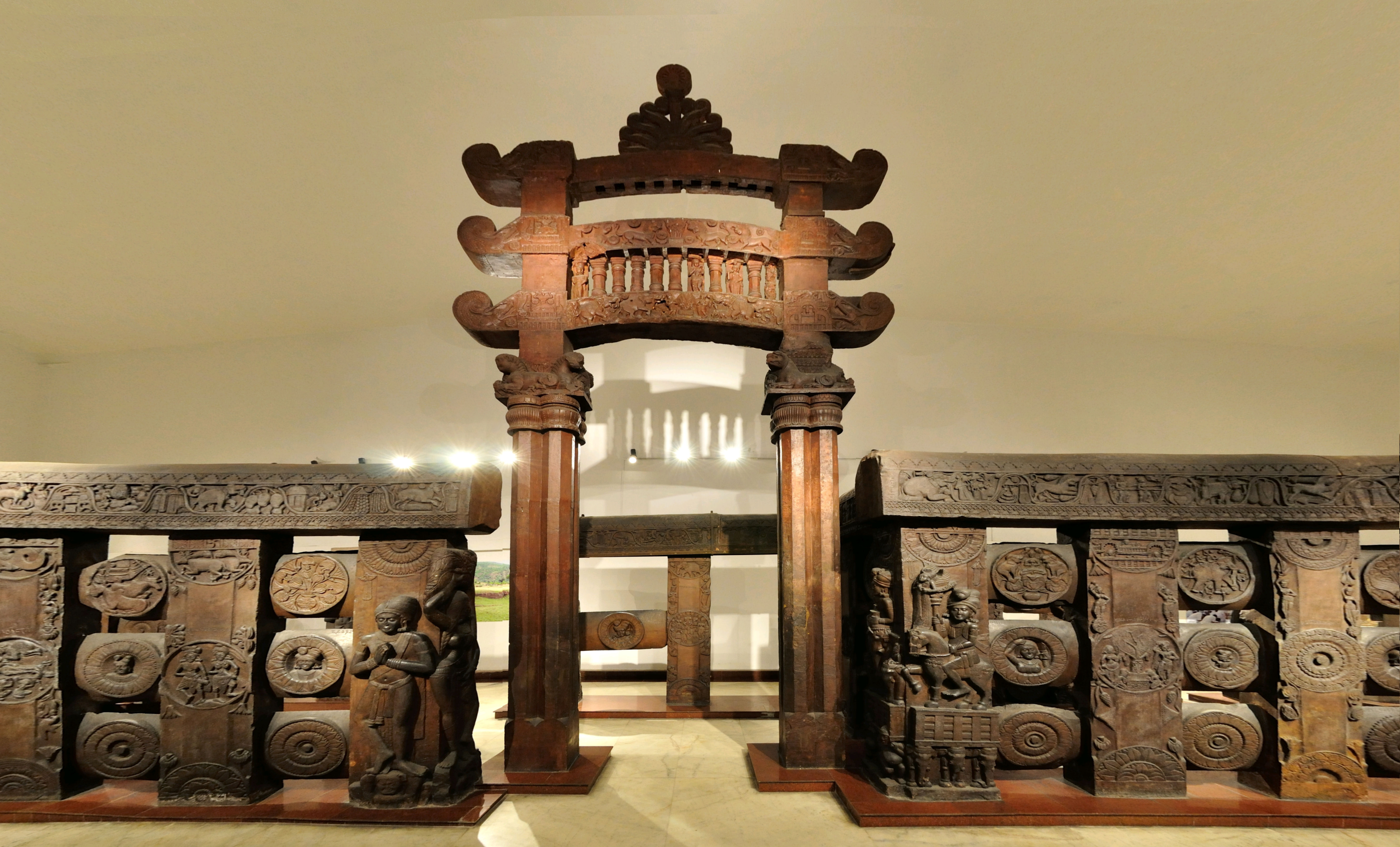
The torana and railings (part) from the Bharhut Stupa, before 75 BC

The thrust for a full-fledged Museum was held up due to the intervention of the revolt of the sepoys of the East India Company. The matter was pursued again, once things settled down after India came under the Crown.

Thereafter the First Indian Museum Act was passed in 1866 and the foundation of the Indian Museum at its present site laid in 1867. In 1875 the present building on Chowringee Road, presently Jawaharlal Nehru Road, designed by W L Granville in consultation with Sir Thomas Holland, on Chowringee was completed. In 1877 after the retirement of Sir Thomas Oldham in 1876 the Geological Survey of India including the Museum of Economic Geology shifted here from its rented accommodation on 1 Hastings Road.

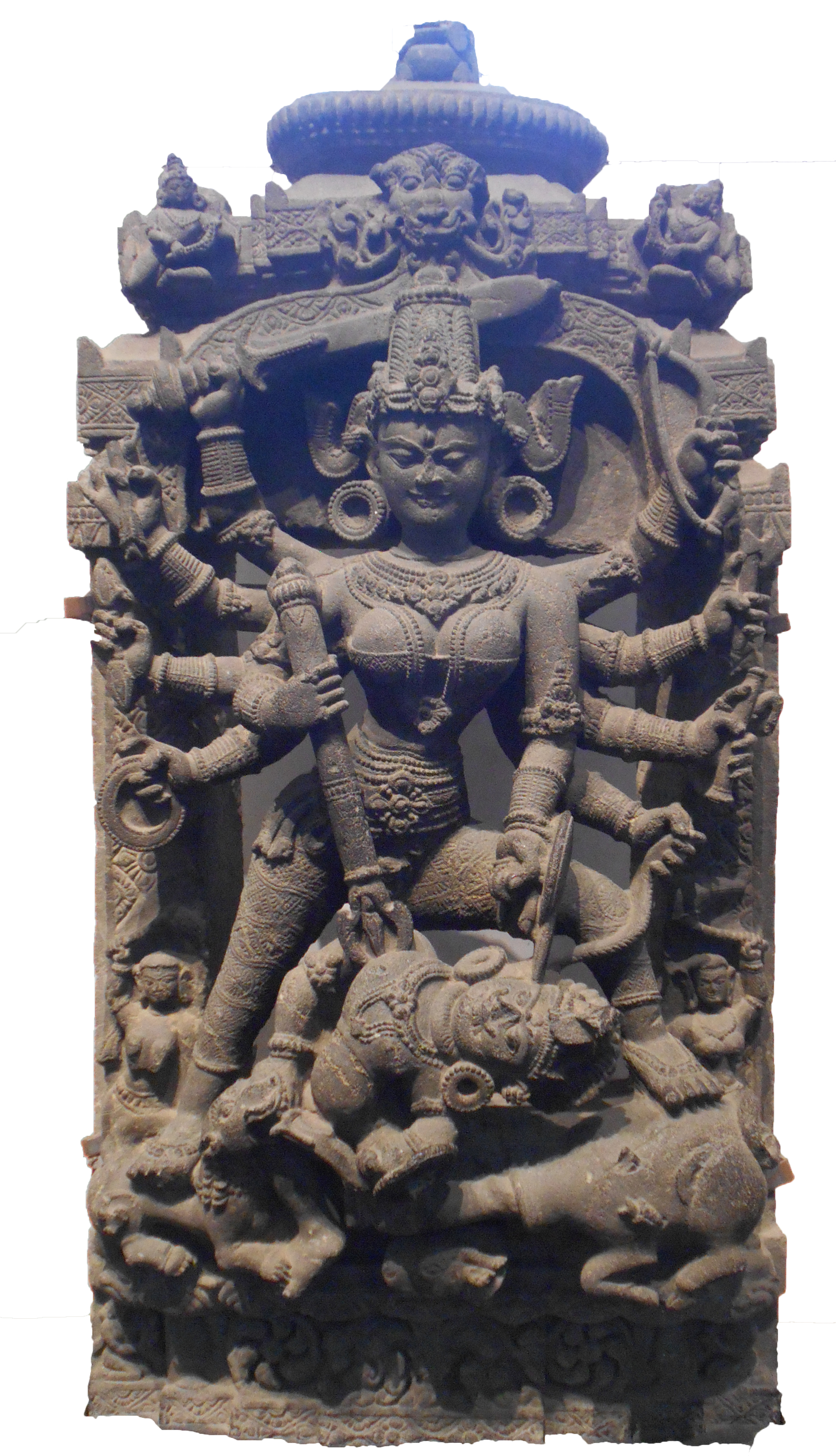
Stone sculpture of Devi Durga

This building had been designated as the site for not just the Asiatic Societies, Oriental Museum's collection and the Economic Geology collection of the Geological Survey of India but also to hold the offices of both.

The Asiatic Society however relinquished its rights preferring to maintain its autonomy from the government. The Geological Survey of India is till date headquartered at the buildings of the Indian Museum Complex and holds exclusive rights over the Geological galleries of the Indian Museum.

The building parallel to Sudder Street commenced in 1888 and occupied in 1891. The next building block at right angle to Sudder Street was erected in 1894. Half of this building was consigned to the Geological Survey of India but by 1912 it was wholly transferred to it.

The Zoological and Anthropological sections of the museum gave rise to the Zoological Survey of India in 1916, which in turn gave rise to the Anthropological Survey of India in 1945.

The Scottish anatomist and zoologist John Anderson took up the position of curator in 1865, and catalogued the mammal and archaeology collections. The English zoologist James Wood-Mason worked at the museum from 1869 and succeeded Anderson as curator in 1887.

The museum was closed to visitors for restoration and upgrades from September 2013 to February 2014.

== Collections ==
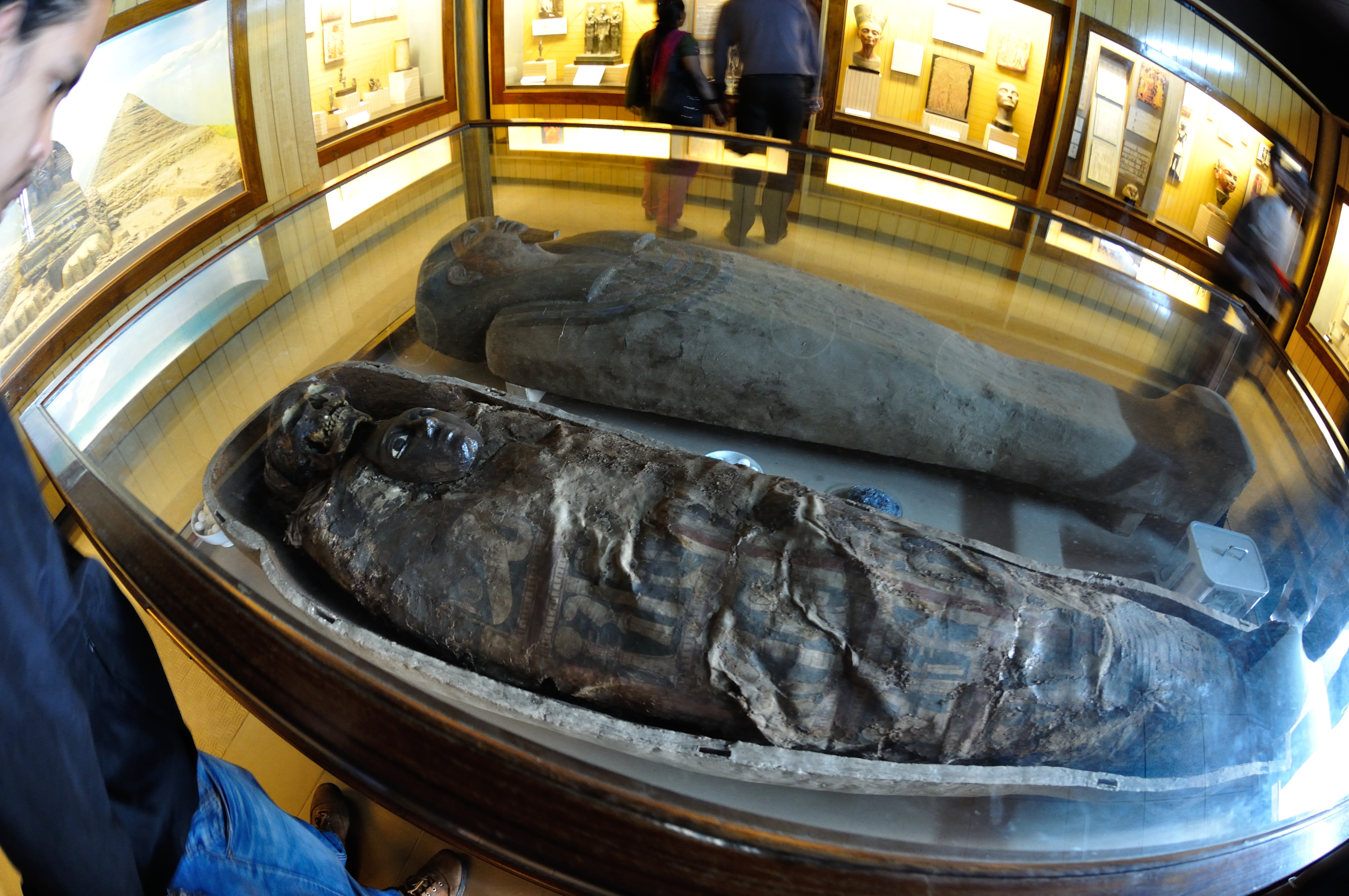
Egyptian human mummy, about 4,000 years old, at the museum.

=== Egyptian ===
It currently occupies a resplendent mansion, and exhibits among others: an Egyptian mummy. The mummy gallery is being currently restored.

=== Indian ===
The large collection of ancient and medieval Indian artifacts include the complete railings and gateways of the Buddhist stupa from Bharhut (the bare stupa is still at Bharhut, near Satna, Madhya Pradesh). The Bharhut panels are unique in that they are inscribed in the Brahmi script. The museum has a collection of the remains of the slightly later Amaravati Stupa. There is a large and representative collection of Buddhist and Hindu sculptures of the medieval period, especially those from Bengal, Bihar, and Odisha.

Also preserved are Buddha's relics, a copy of the Lion Capital of Ashoka from an Ashoka pillar (original in the Sarnath Museum) whose four-lion symbol became the official emblem of the Republic of India, fossil skeletons of prehistoric animals, an art collection (including sculptures featuring Gandhara art, Indian miniature paintings, pattachitra, lithographs), rare antiques (including Terracotta artefacts from 3rd century BCE to 12th century CE), and a collection of meteorites.

The Indian Museum is also regarded as "the beginning of a significant epoch initiating the socio-cultural and scientific achievements of the country. It is otherwise considered as the beginning of the modernity and the end of medieval era".

=== Natural history ===
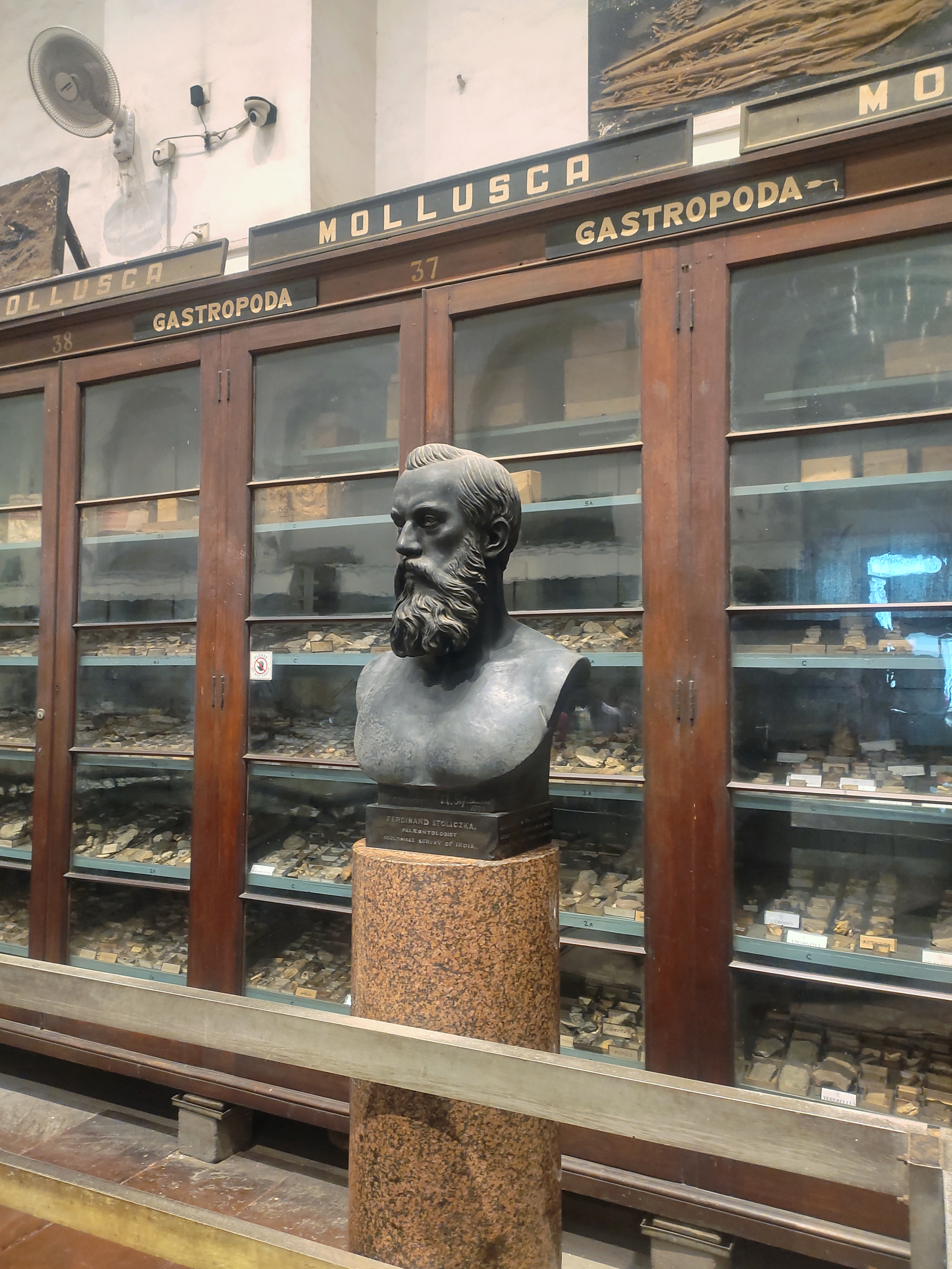
Bust of the Moravian – Indian paleontologist Ferdinand Stoliczka in the paleontology section

The museum has four galleries dedicated to natural history, namely the botanical, insect, mammal and bird galleries featuring a large number of taxidermied specimens as well as skeletons. There are also two fossil galleries, one featuring vertebrate fossils from the Shiwalik region, the other featuring mostly invertebrate fossils along with some marine reptile fossils and the egg of a sauropod dinosaur.

== Administration ==
Administrative control of the Cultural sections, viz. Art, Archaeology and Anthropology rests with the Board of Trustees under its Directorate, and that of the three other science sections is with the geological survey of India, the zoological survey of India and the Botanical survey of India. The museum Directorate has eight co-ordinating service units: Education, preservation, publication, presentation, photography, medical, modelling and library. This multipurpose institution with multidisciplinary activities is being included as an Institute of national importance in the seventh schedule of the Constitution of India.

== Museum gallery ==
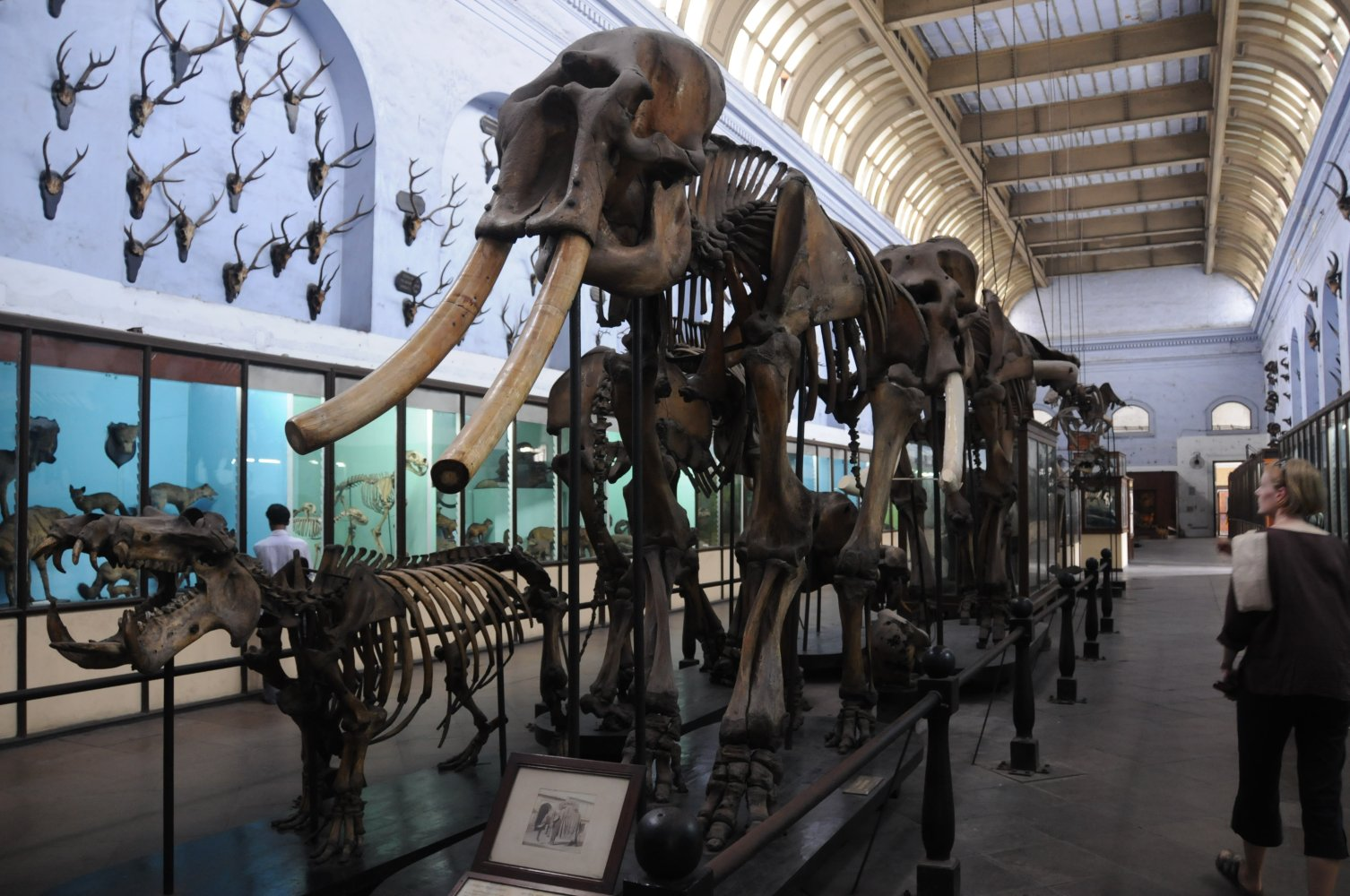
Elephant skeleton

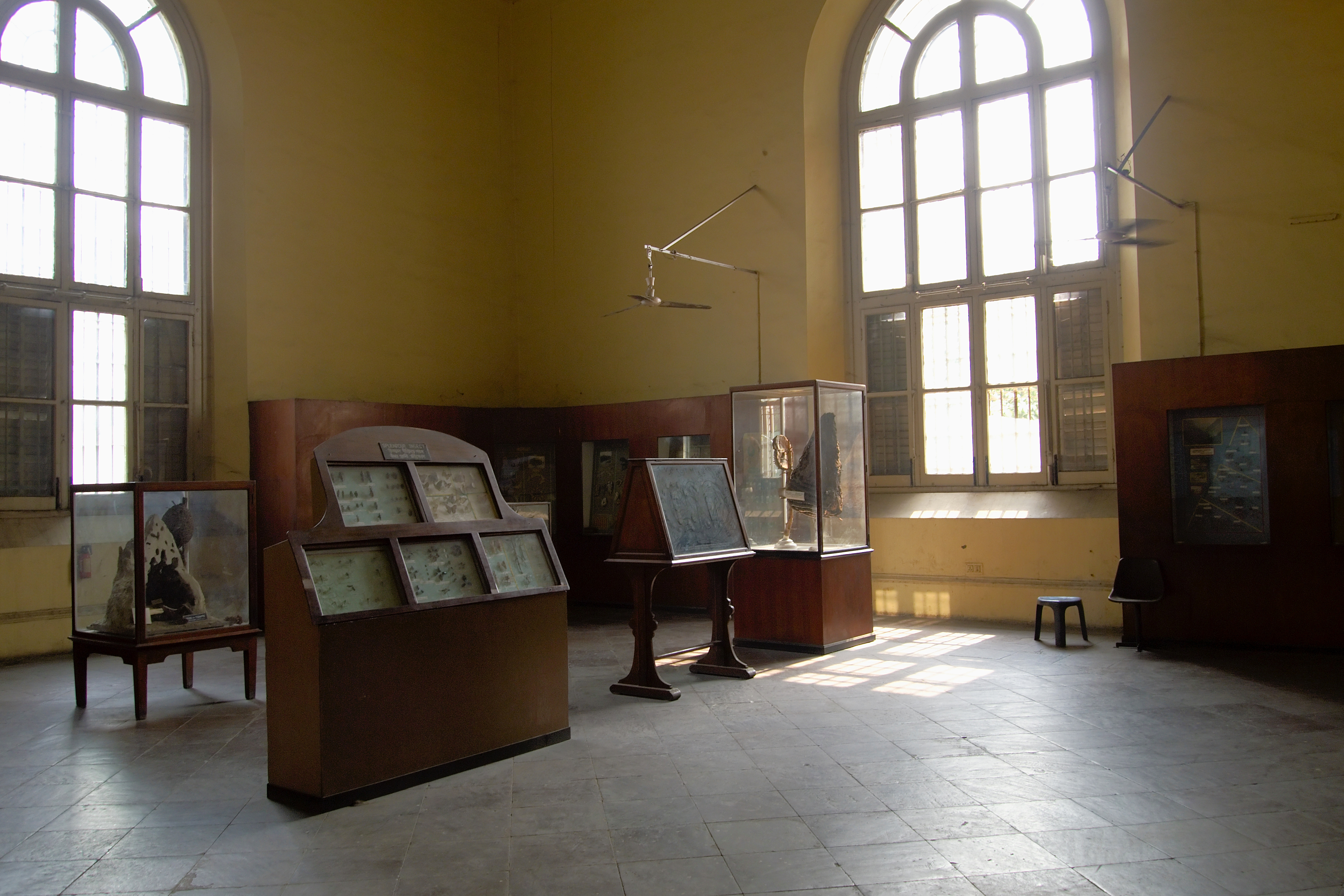
Gallery

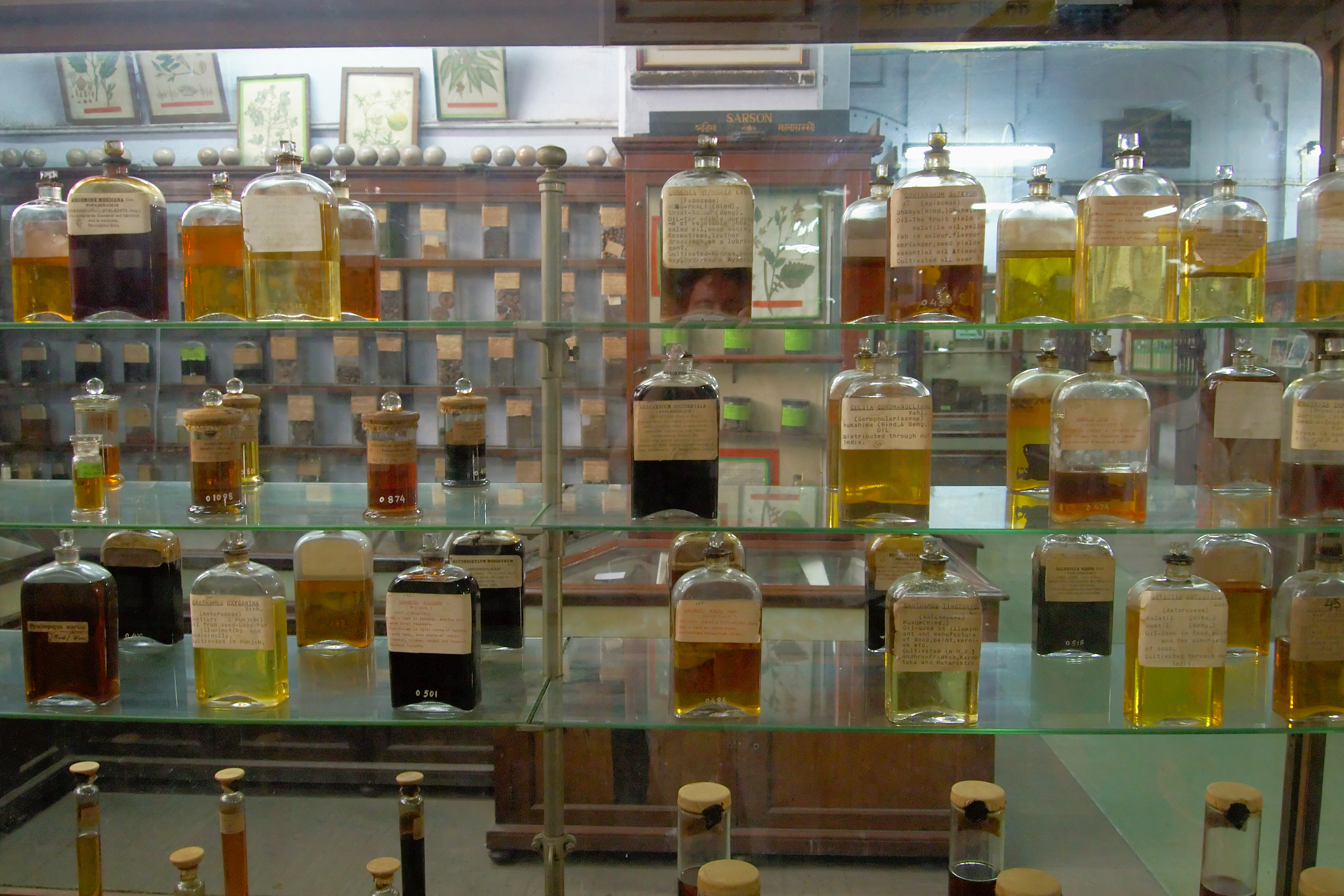
Jars

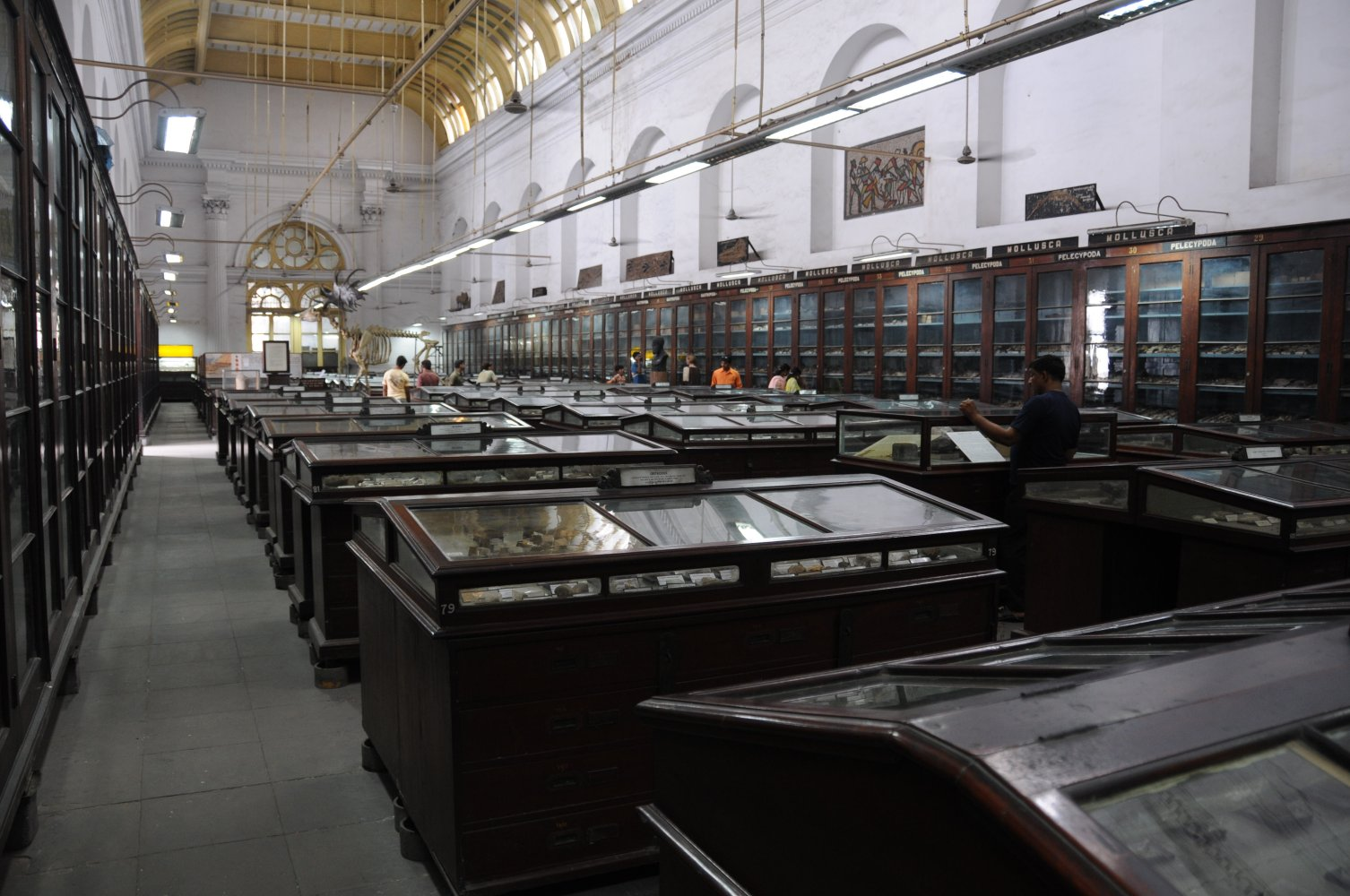
Showcases with different types of fossils

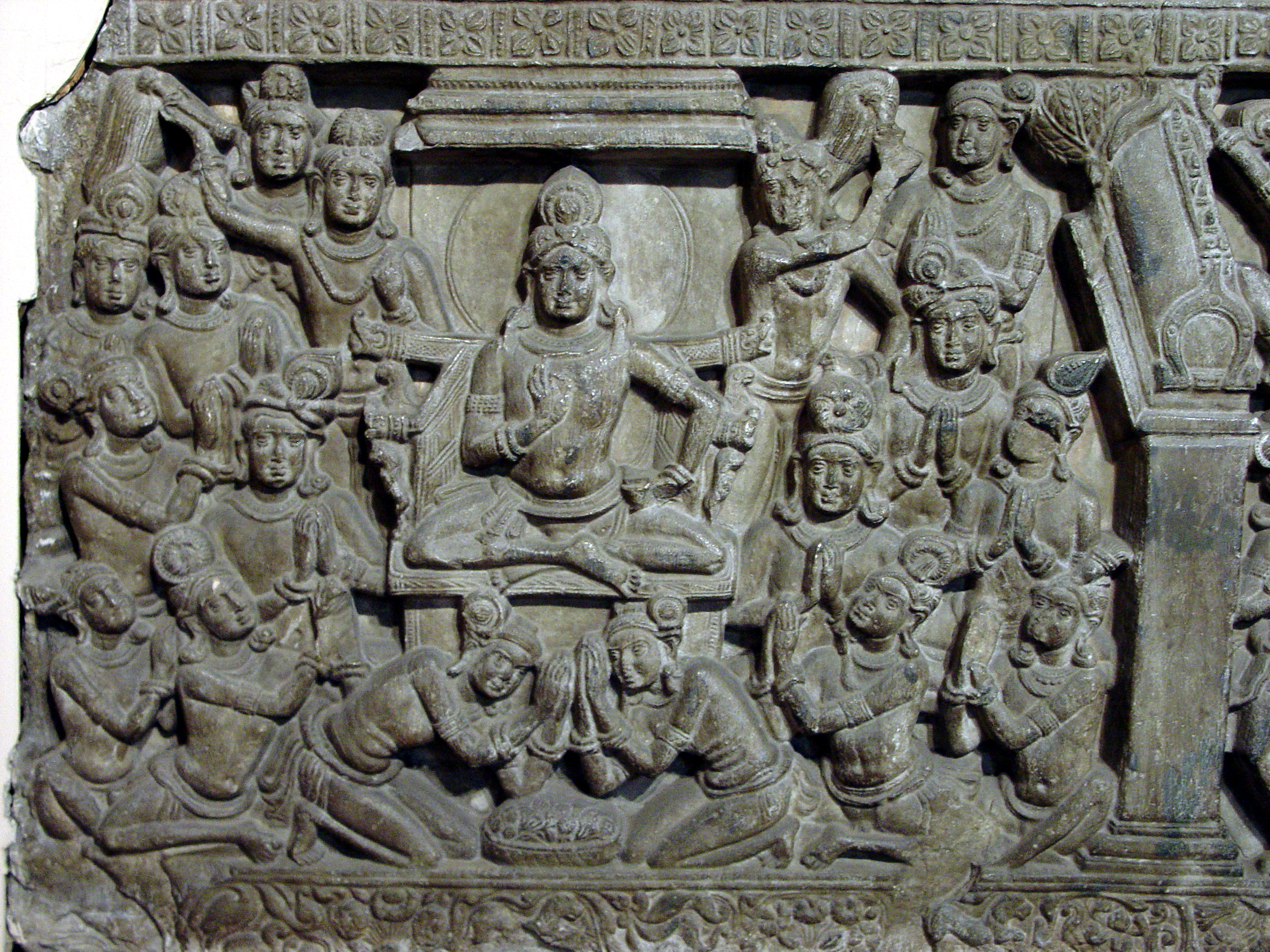
Buddha Preaching in Tushita Heaven, Amaravati Stupa, Satavahana period, 2d century AD

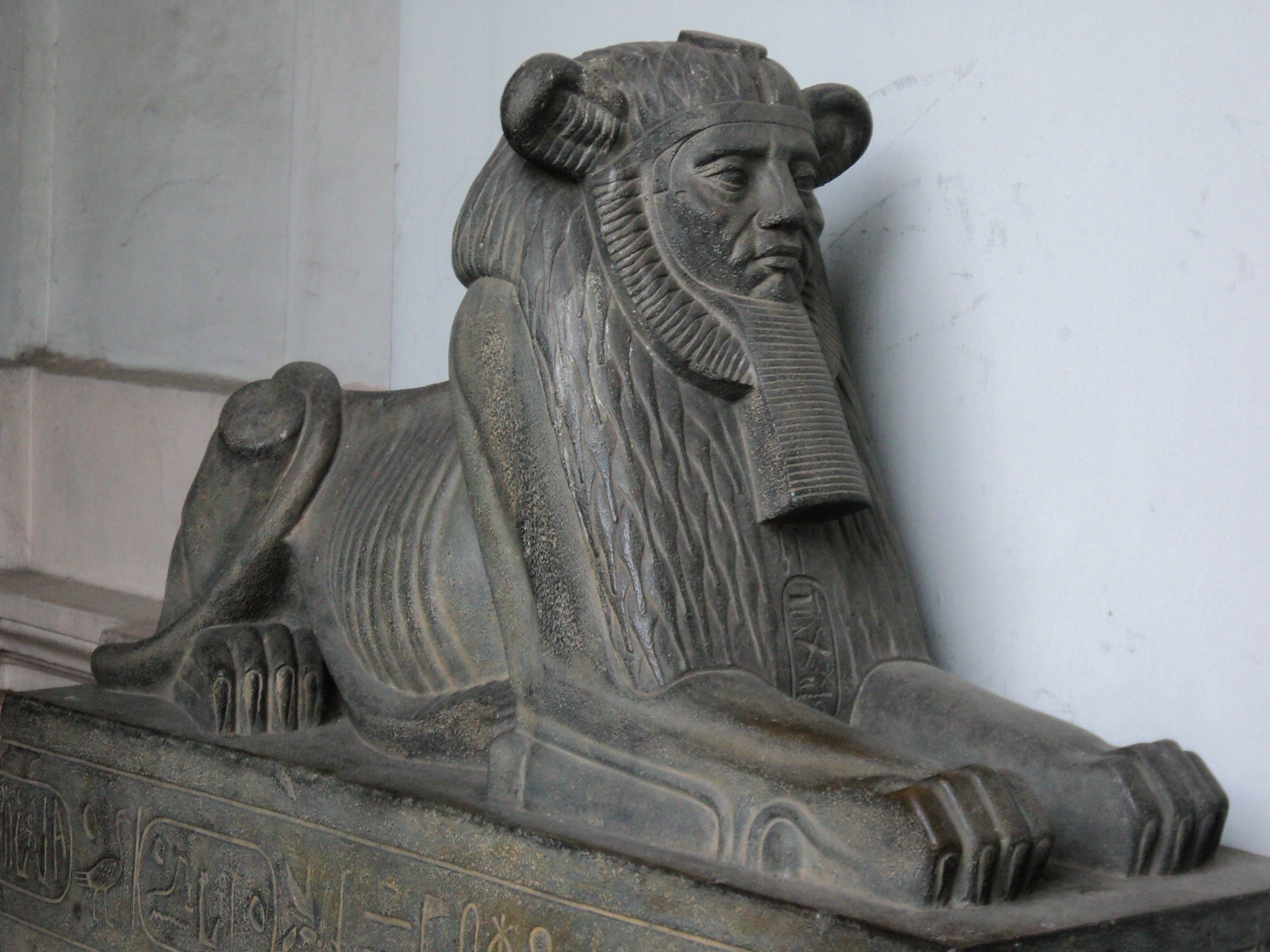
Egyptian Exhibit

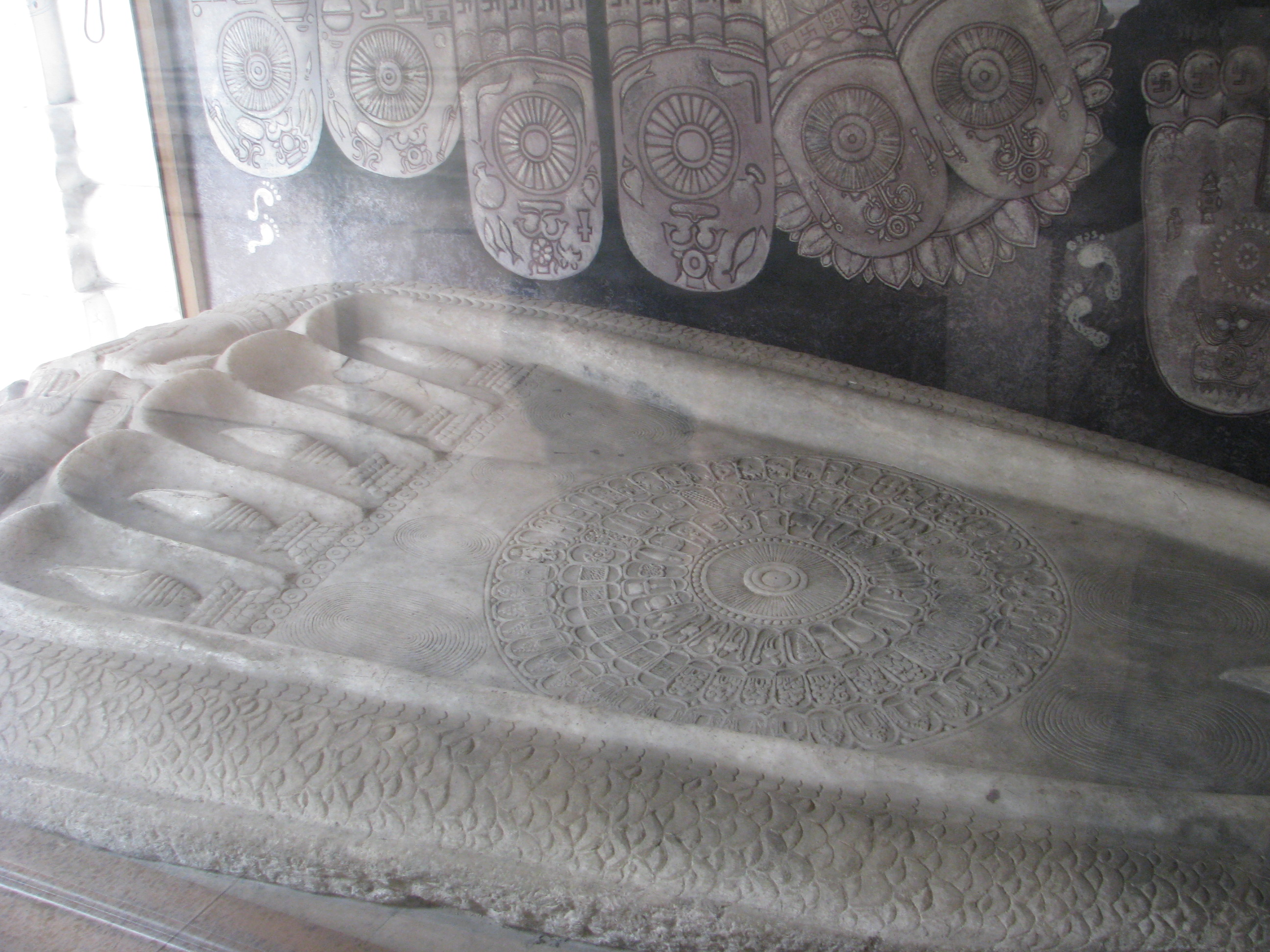
Stone imprint of Buddha's foot

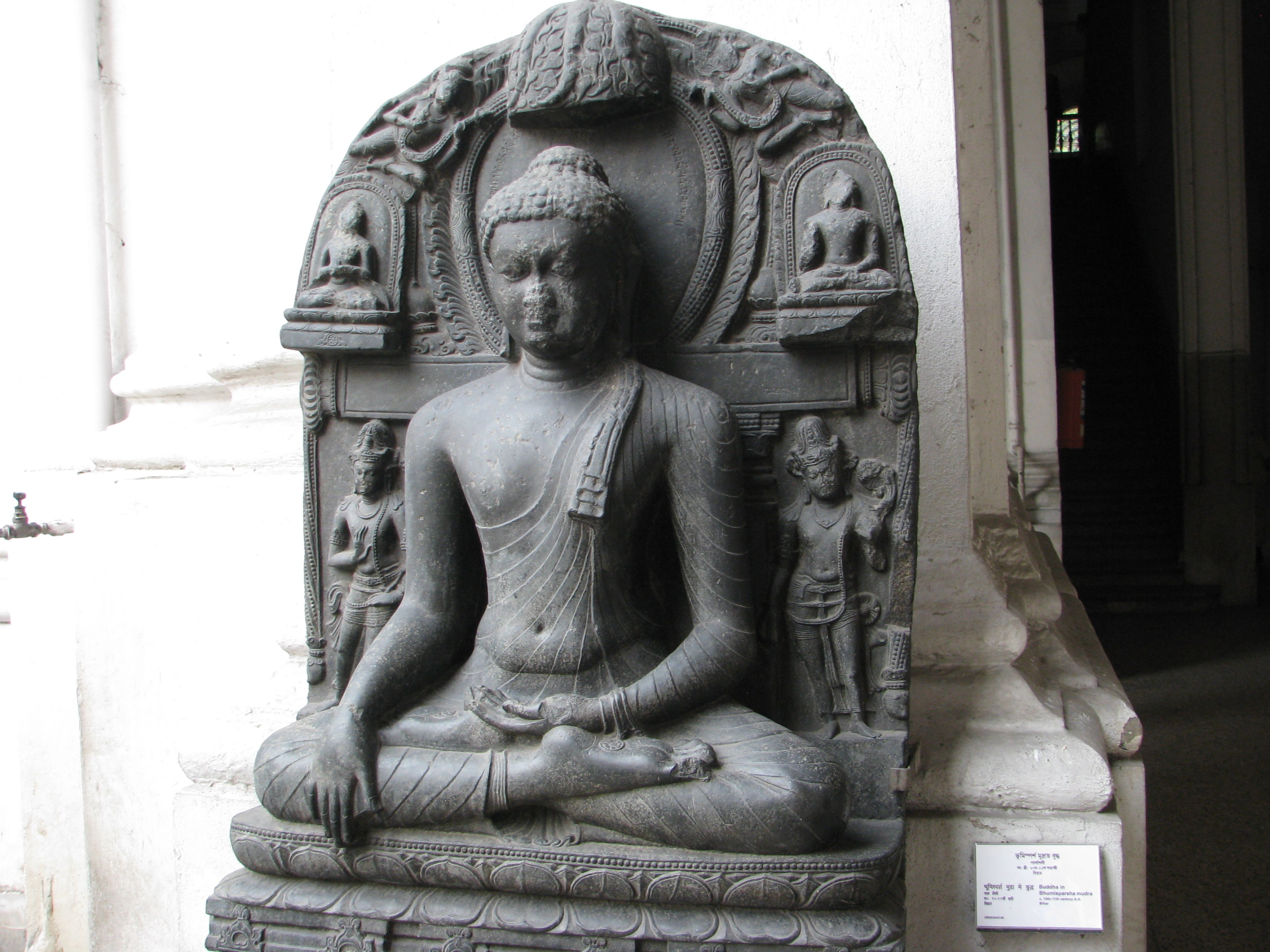
Buddha

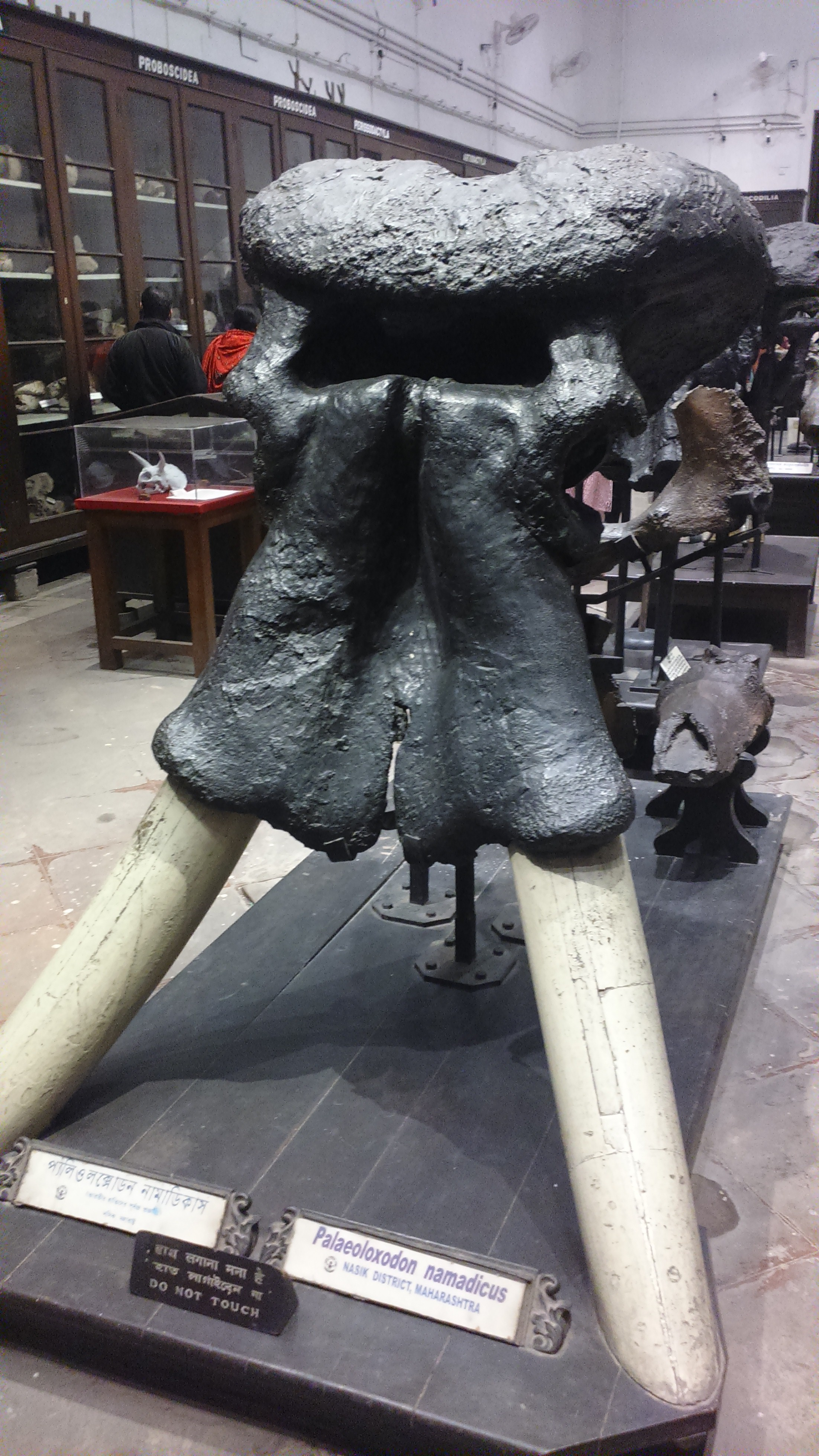
Palaeoloxodon namadicus, extinct elephant

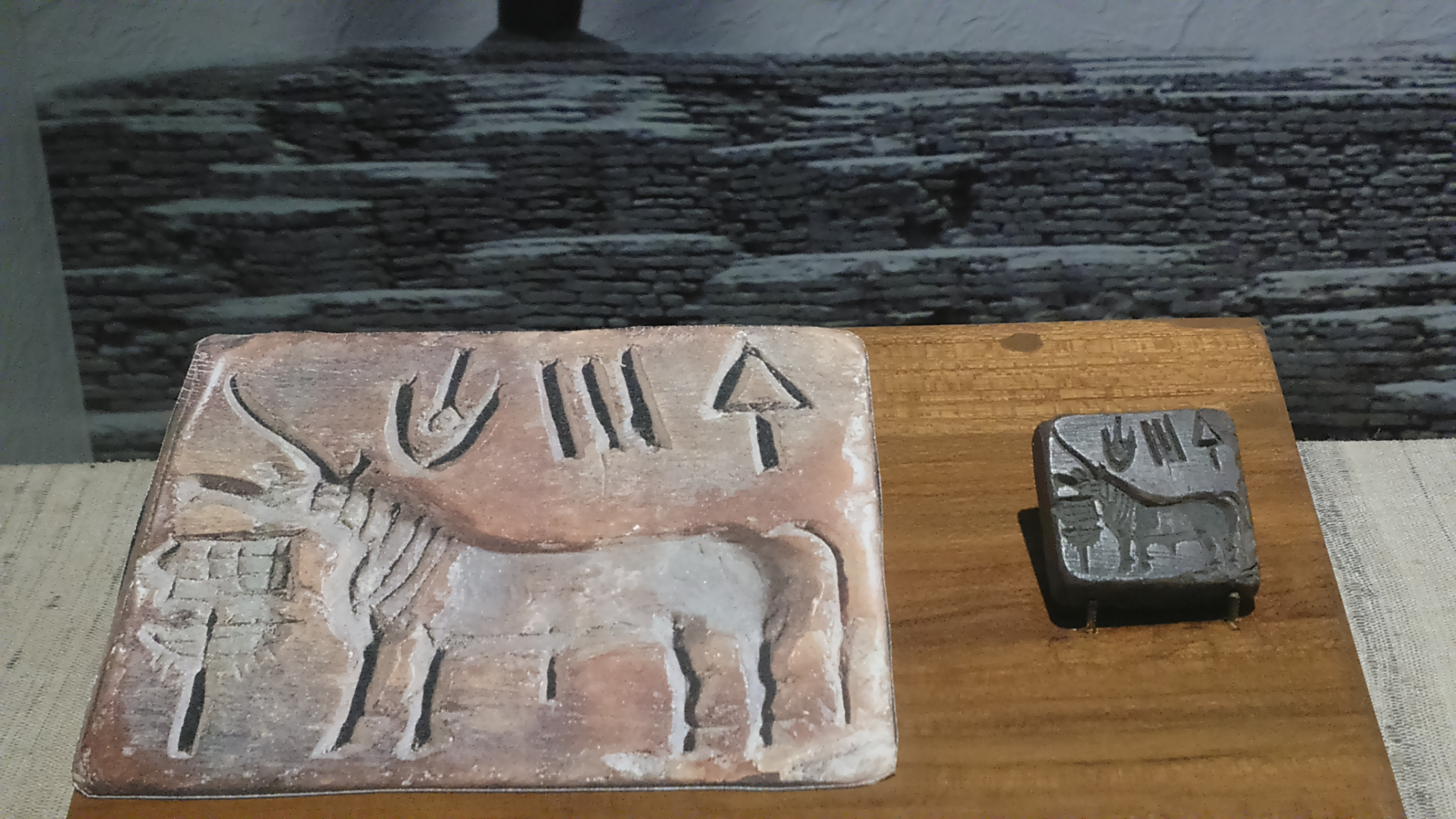
Unicorn seal of Indus Valley

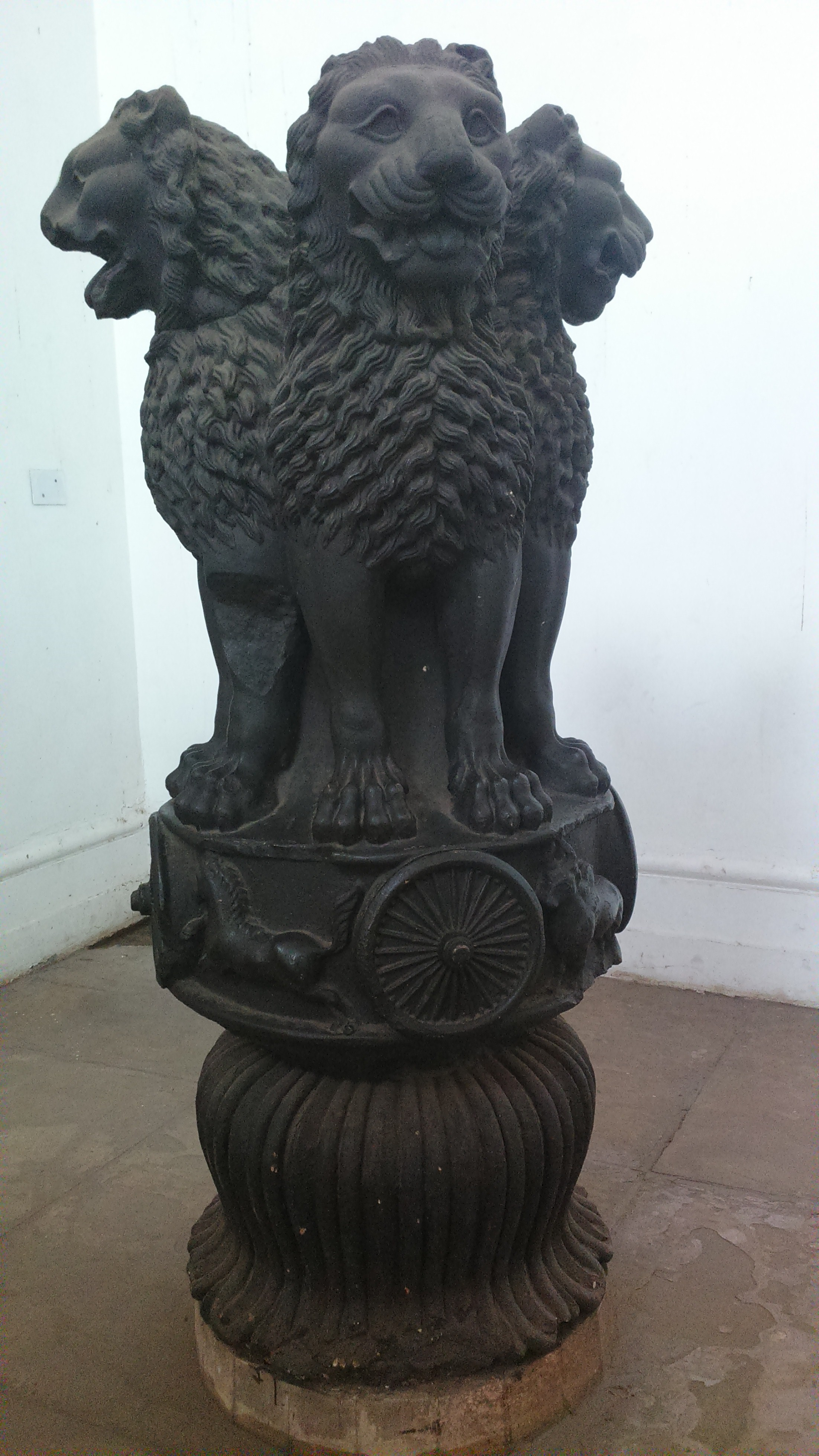
Copy of the Lion Capital of Ashoka

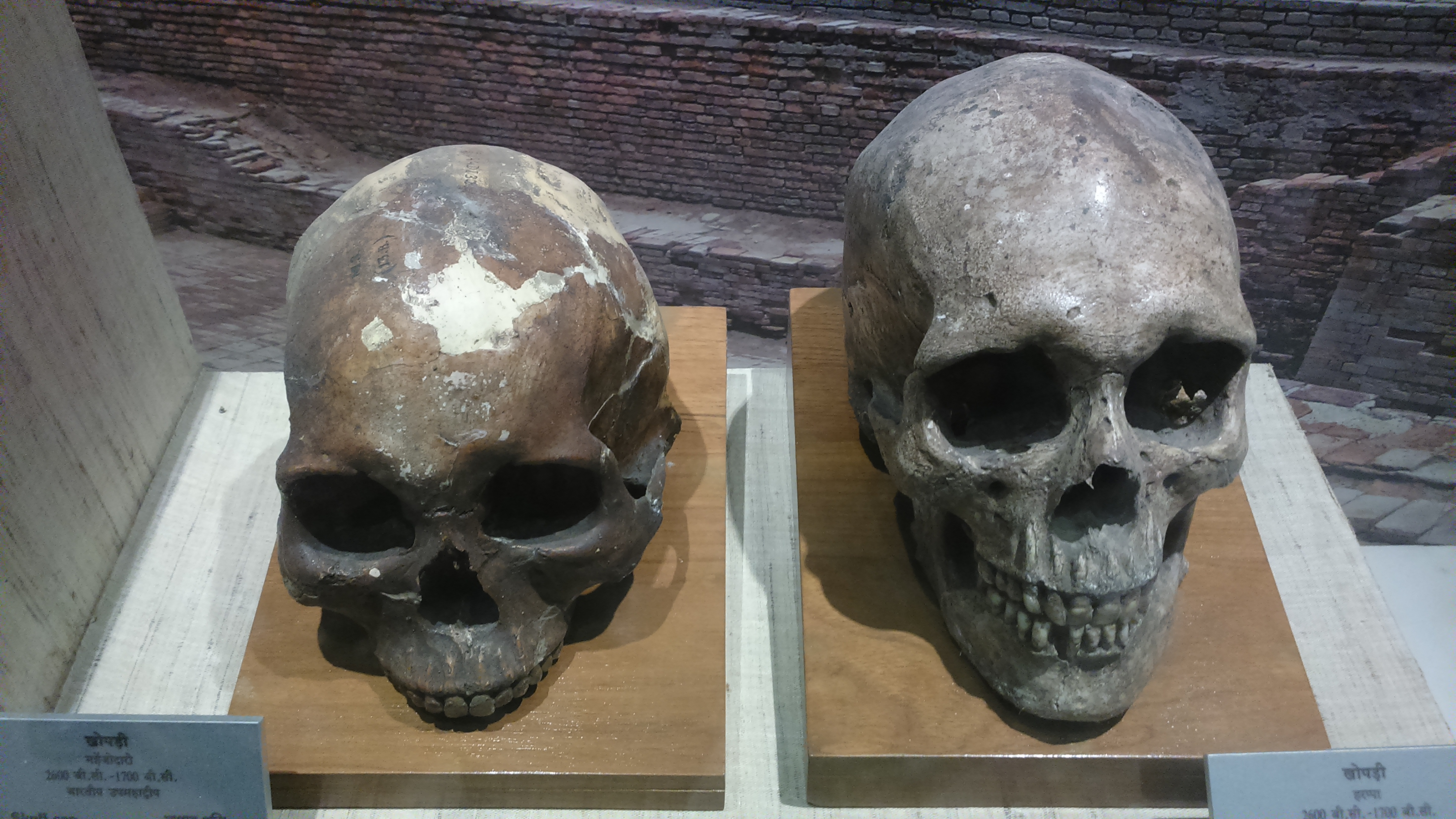
Skull of Indus Valley inhabitants

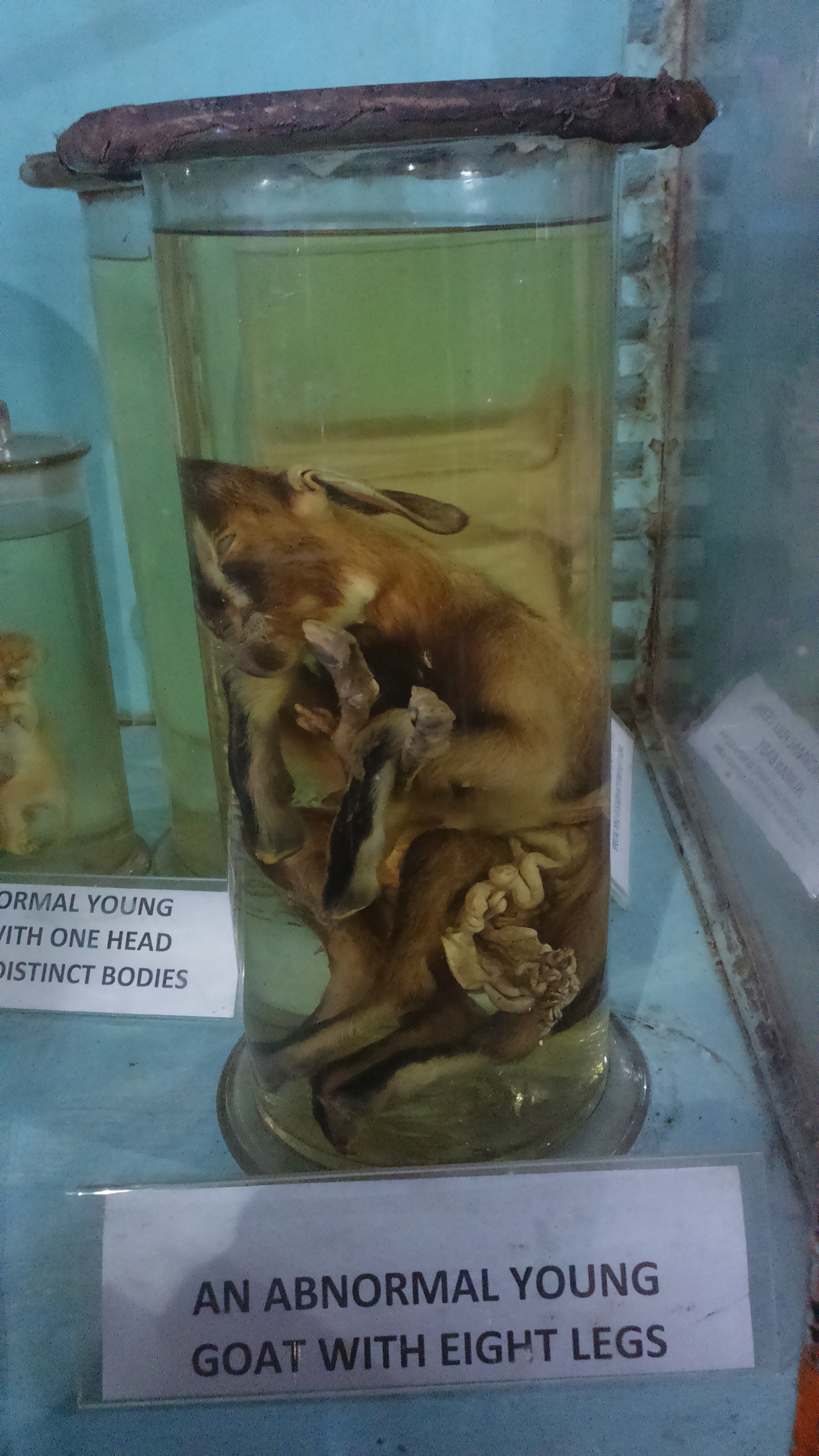
Young goat with eight legs

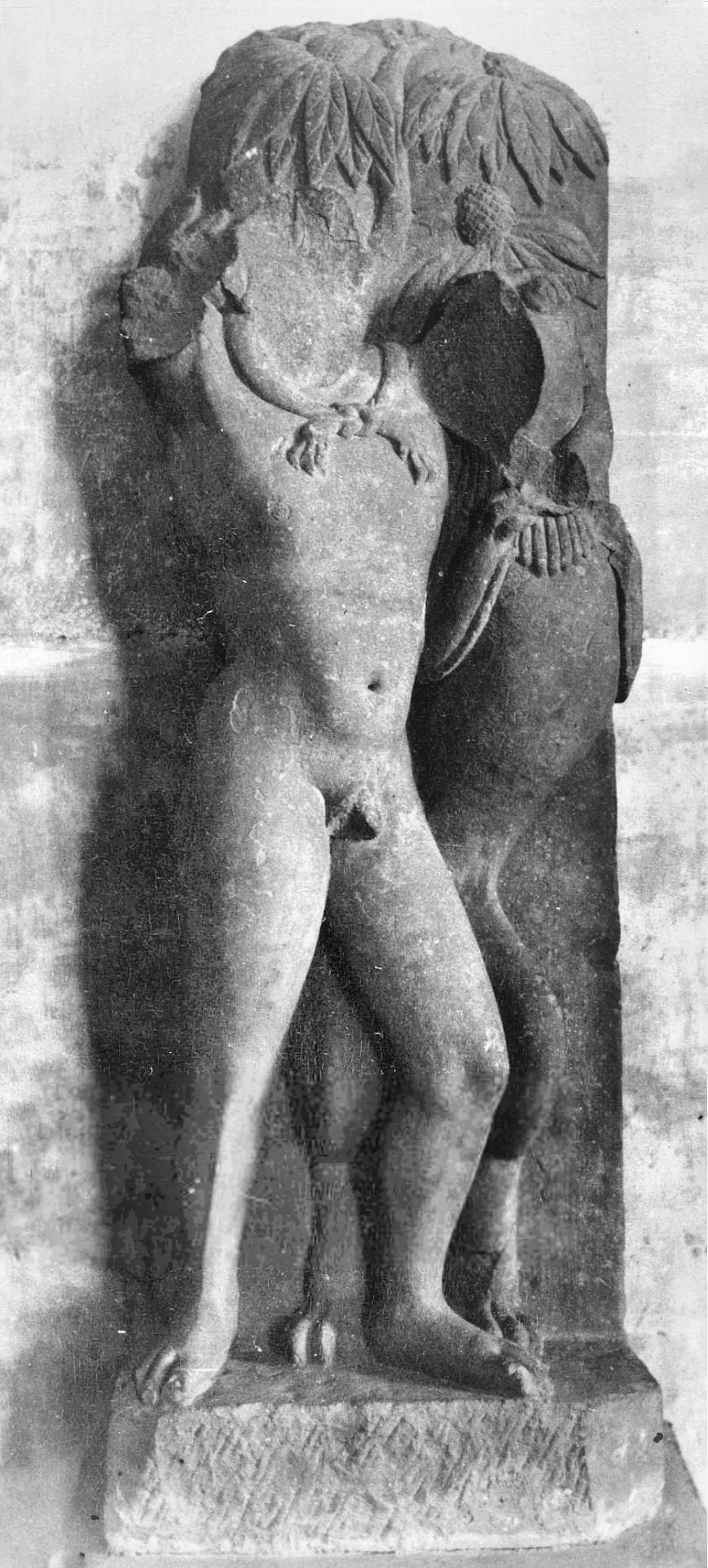
The Mathura Herakles.

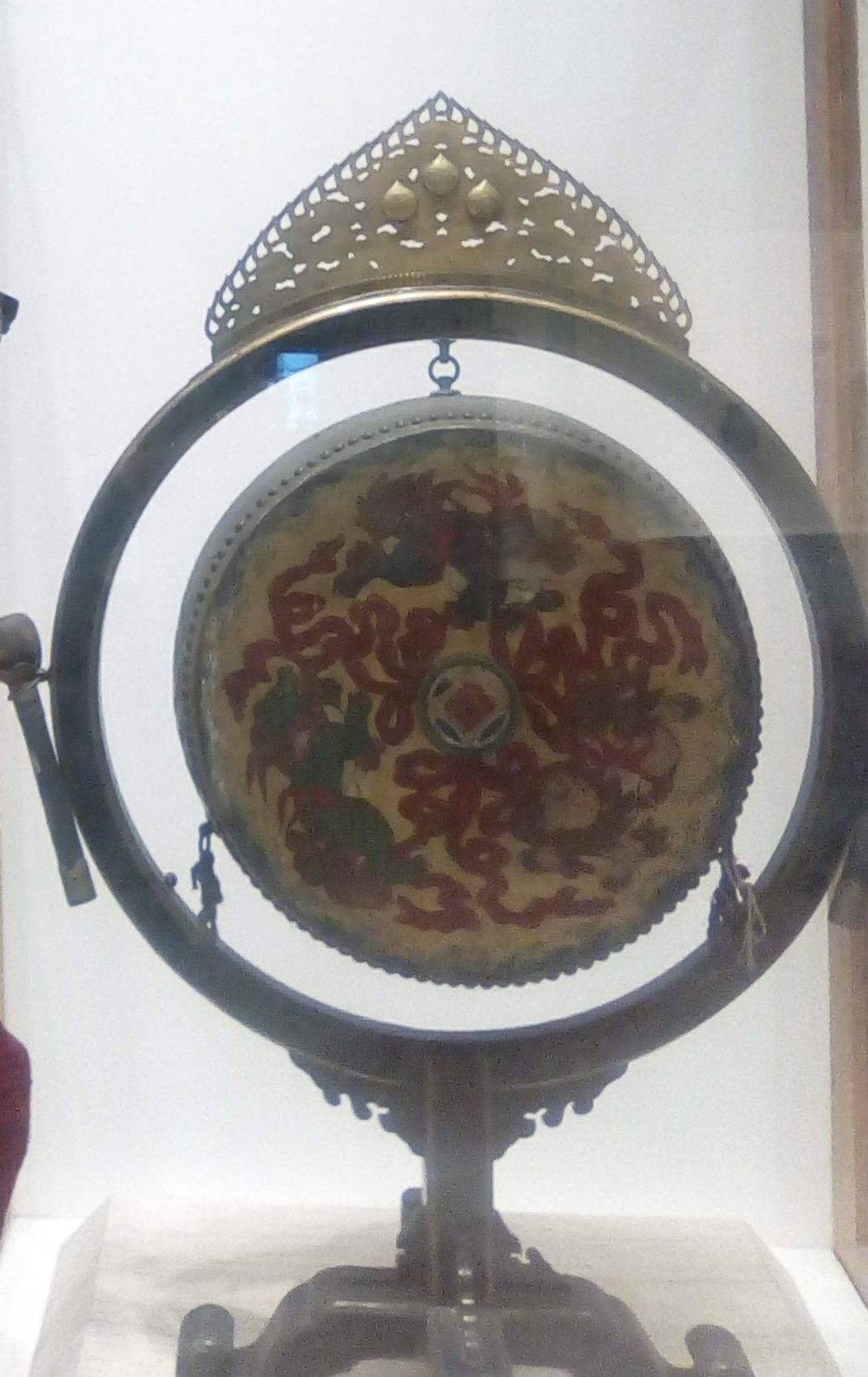
A Tsuri-daiko (gaku-daiko), the large Japanese hanging drum, on display.

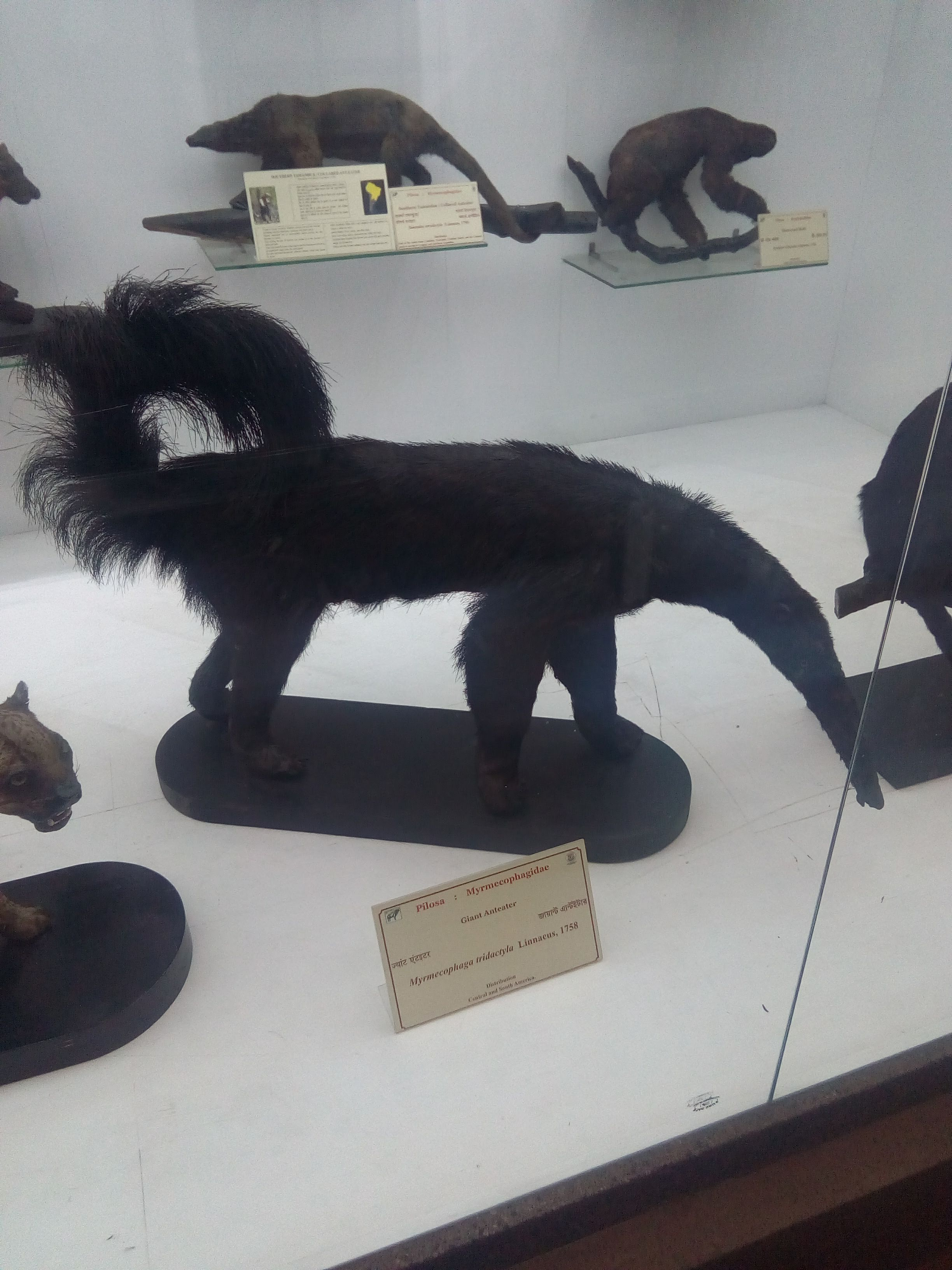
Revamped gallery of animals (specimens)

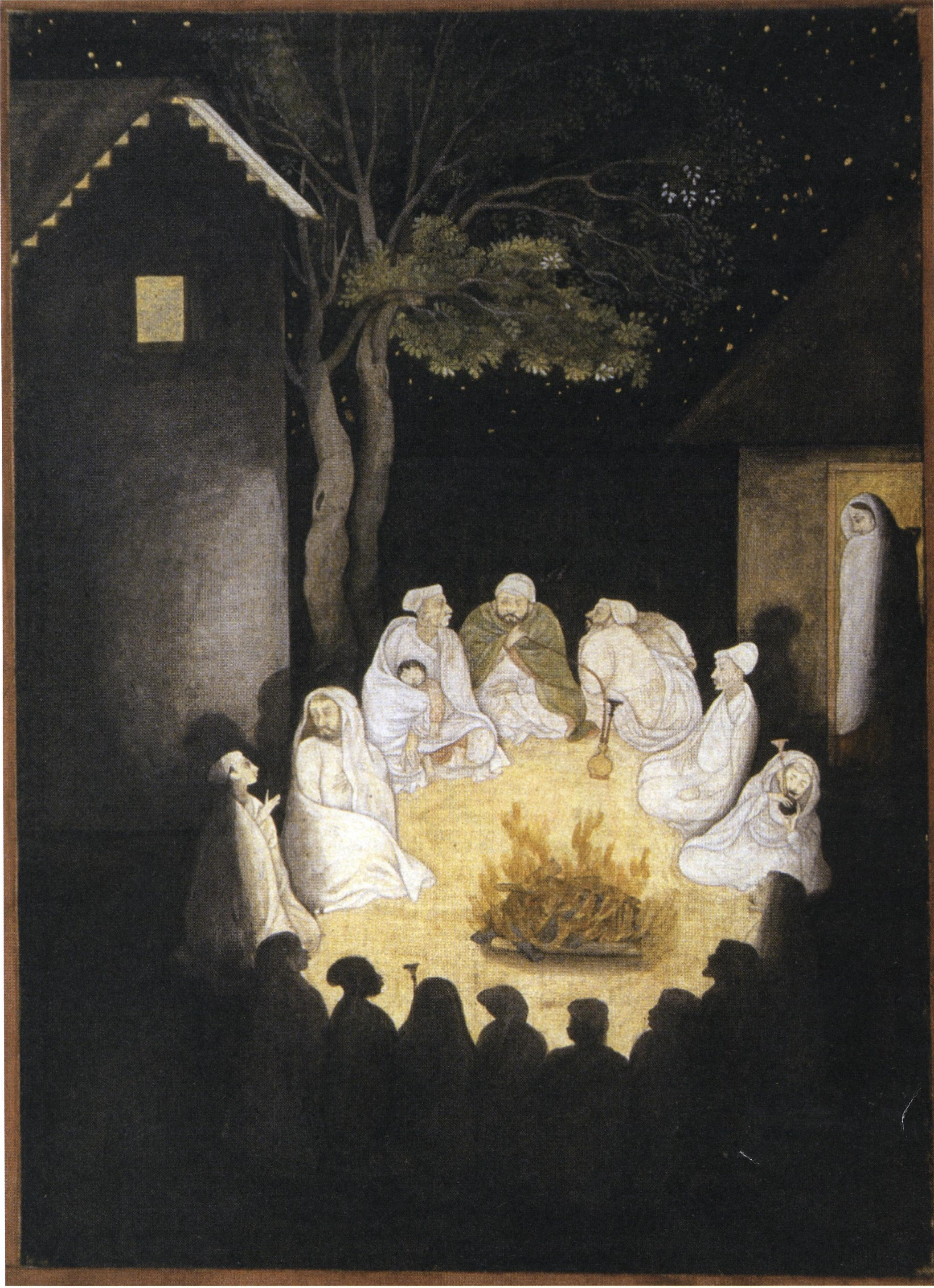
Villagers around a fire, painting by Nainsukh. Jasrota, c. 1765-1775
