= A Naturalist in Indian Seas =

1902 text by Alfred William Alcock

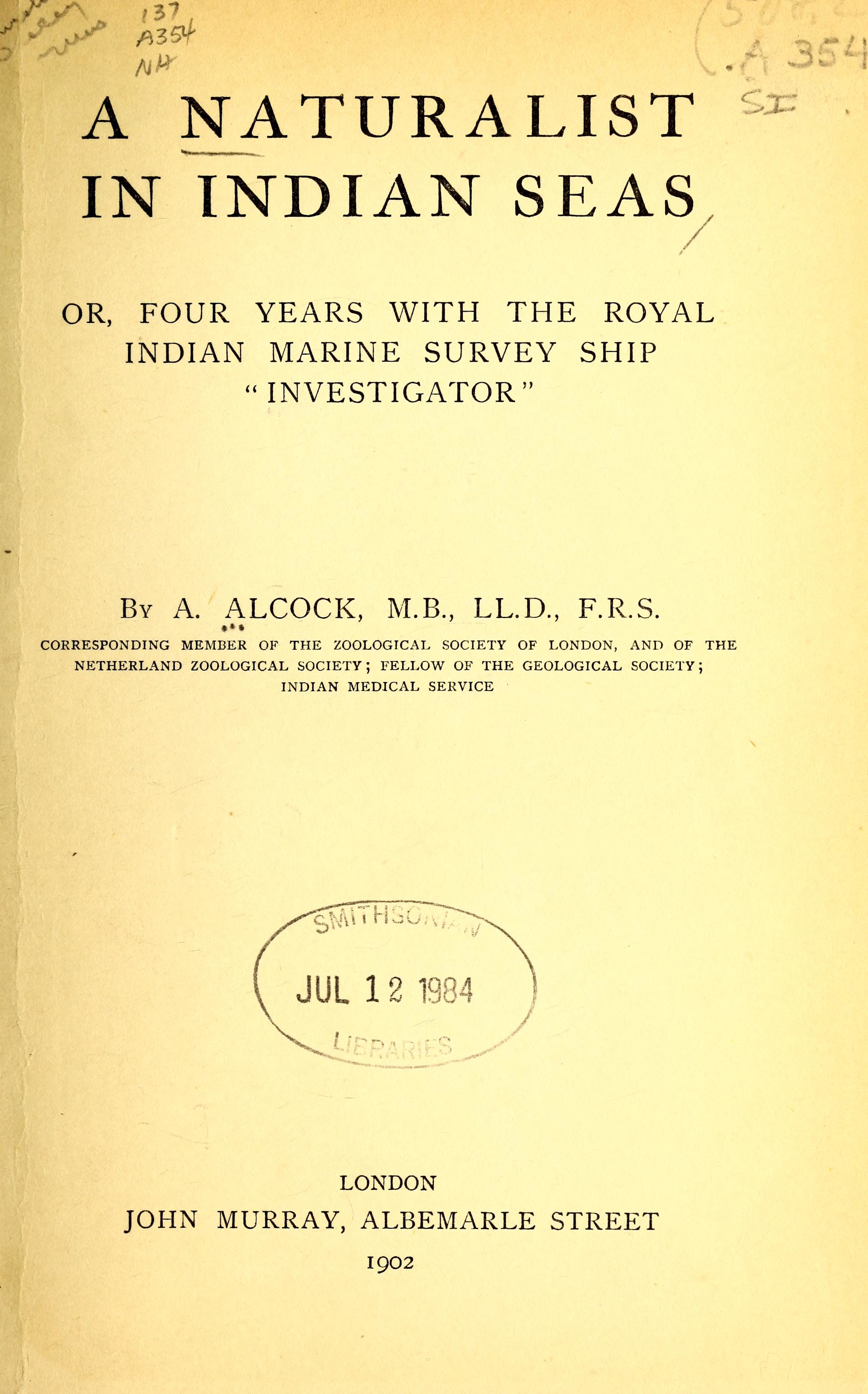
- Title page for A Naturalist in Indian Seas, or, Four Years with the Royal Indian Marine Survey Ship Investigator (1902)
- Author: Alfred William Alcock
- Genre: Travel
- Publication date: 1902

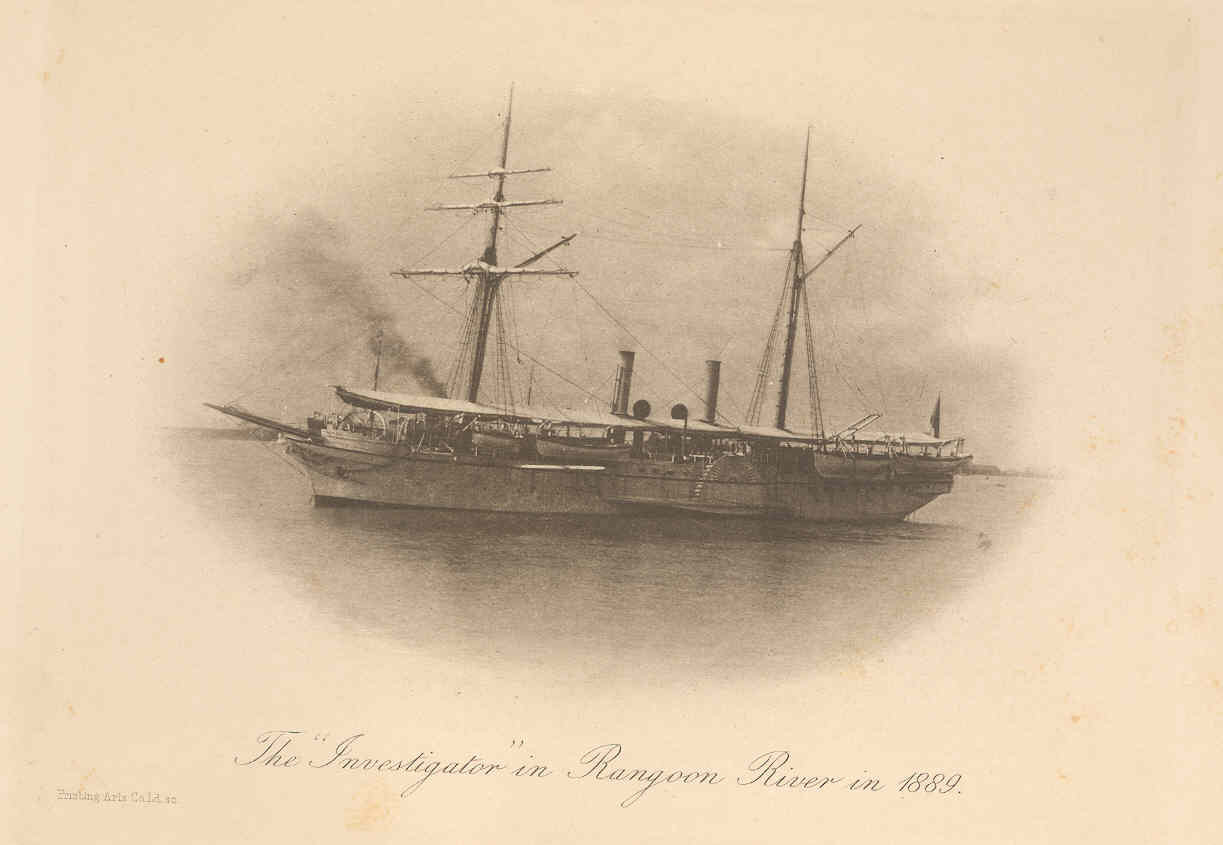
Investigator in Burma

A Naturalist in Indian Seas, or, Four Years with the Royal Indian Marine Survey Ship Investigator is a 1902 publication by Alfred William Alcock, a British naturalist and carcinologist. The book is mostly a narrative describing the Investigator's journey through areas of the Indian Ocean, such as the Laccadive Sea, the Bay of Bengal and the Andaman Sea. It also details the history of the Investigator, as well as the marine biology of the Indian Ocean.

The book is considered a classic in natural history travel, and in 1903, The Geographical Journal described it as "a most fascinating and complete popular account of the deep-sea fauna of the Indian seas. The book is one of intense interest throughout to a zoologist". In its original edition, A Naturalist in Indian Seas was 328 pages long and published in 8 volumes in London.
