= Aposematism =

Honest signalling of an animal or plant's defences

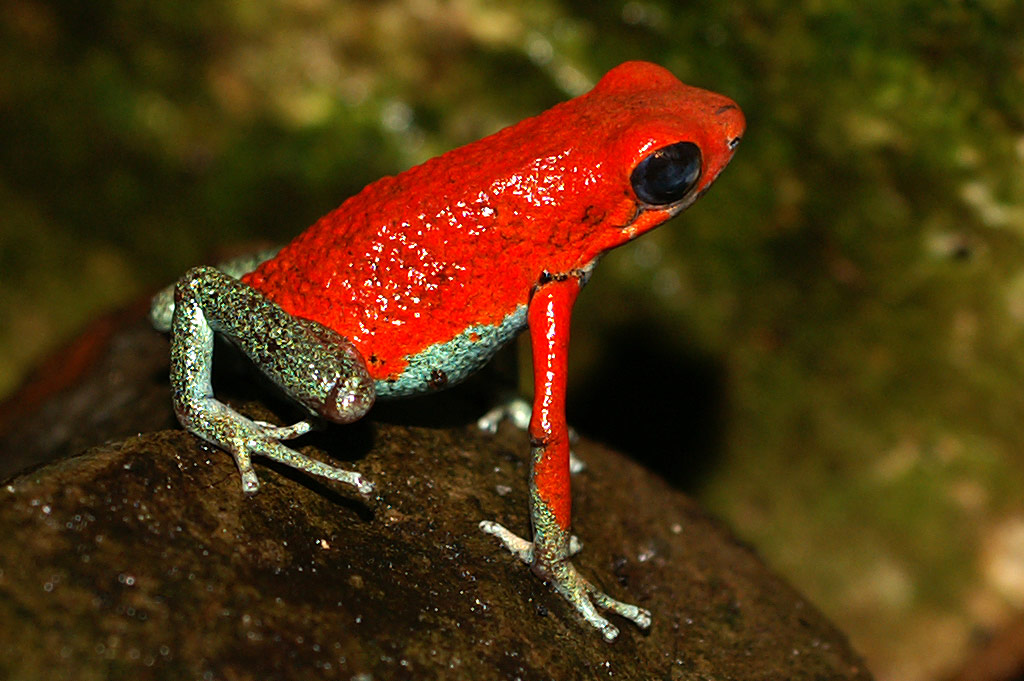
The bright colours of this granular poison frog signal a warning to predators of its toxicity.

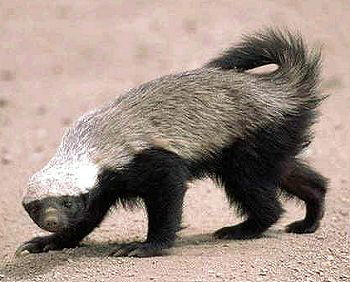
The honey badger's reverse countershading makes it conspicuous, honestly signalling its ability to defend itself through its aggressive temperament and its sharp teeth and claws.

Aposematism is the advertising by an animal or plant, whether terrestrial or aquatic, to potential predators that it is not worth attacking or eating. This unprofitability may consist of any defences that make the prey difficult to kill and eat, such as toxicity, venom, foul taste or smell, sharp spines, or aggressive nature. These advertising signals may take the form of conspicuous coloration, sounds, odours, or other perceivable characteristics. Aposematic signals are beneficial for both predator and prey, because both avoid potential harm.

The term was coined in 1877 by Edward Bagnall Poulton for Alfred Russel Wallace's concept of warning coloration. Aposematism is exploited in Müllerian mimicry, wherein species with strong defences evolve to resemble one another. By mimicking similarly coloured species the warning signal to predators is shared, causing the predators to learn more quickly at less cost.

A genuine aposematic signal that a species actually possesses chemical or physical defences is not the only way to deter predators. In Batesian mimicry, a mimicking species resembles an aposematic model closely enough to share the protection, while many species have bluffing deimatic displays that may startle a predator long enough to enable an otherwise undefended prey to escape.

== Etymology ==
The term aposematism was coined by the English zoologist Edward Bagnall Poulton in his 1890 book The Colours of Animals. He based the term on the Ancient Greek words ἀπό apo 'away' and σῆμα sēma 'sign', referring to signs that warn other animals away.

== Defence mechanism ==
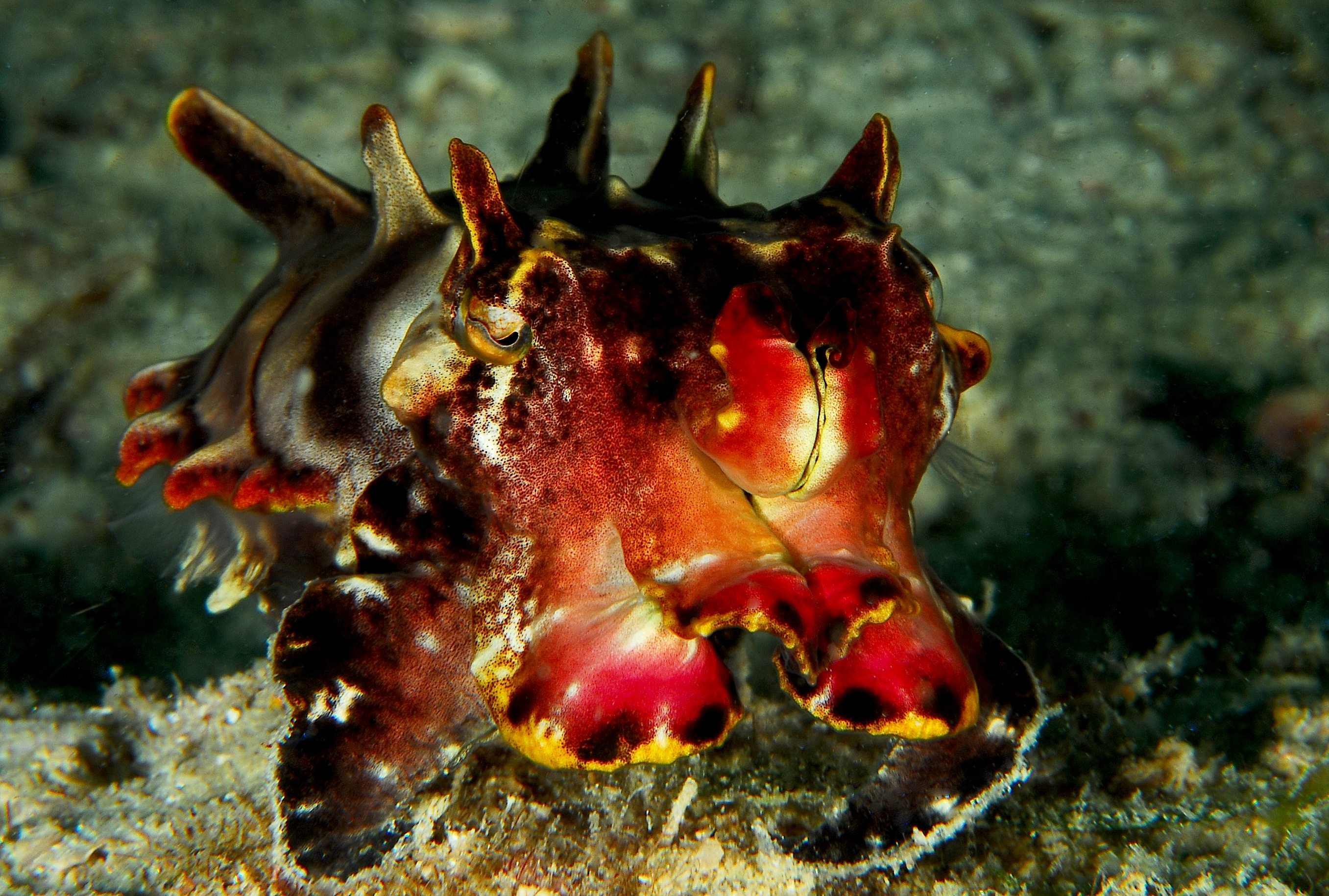
Flamboyant cuttlefish colours warn of toxicity

The function of aposematism is to prevent attack by warning potential predators that the prey animal has defences such as being unpalatable or poisonous. The easily detected warning is a primary defence mechanism, and the non-visible defences are secondary. Aposematic signals are primarily visual, using bright colours and high-contrast patterns such as stripes, but can make use of other perceptible characteristics such as odours. Warning signals are honest indications of noxious prey, because conspicuousness evolves in tandem with noxiousness. Thus, the brighter and more conspicuous the organism, the more toxic it usually is. This is in contrast to deimatic displays, which are attempts to startle predators with a threatening appearance but which are bluffing, i.e., unsupported by any strong defences.

The most common and effective colours are red, yellow, black, and white. These colours provide strong contrast with green foliage, resist changes in shadow and lighting, are highly chromatic, and provide distance dependent camouflage. Some forms of warning coloration provide this distance dependent camouflage by having an effective pattern and color combination that does not allow for easy detection by a predator from a distance but is warning-like up close, thus providing an advantageous balance between camouflage and aposematism. Warning coloration evolves in response to background, light conditions, and predator vision. Visible signals may be accompanied by odors, sounds, or behavior to provide a multi-modal signal that is more effectively detected by predators.

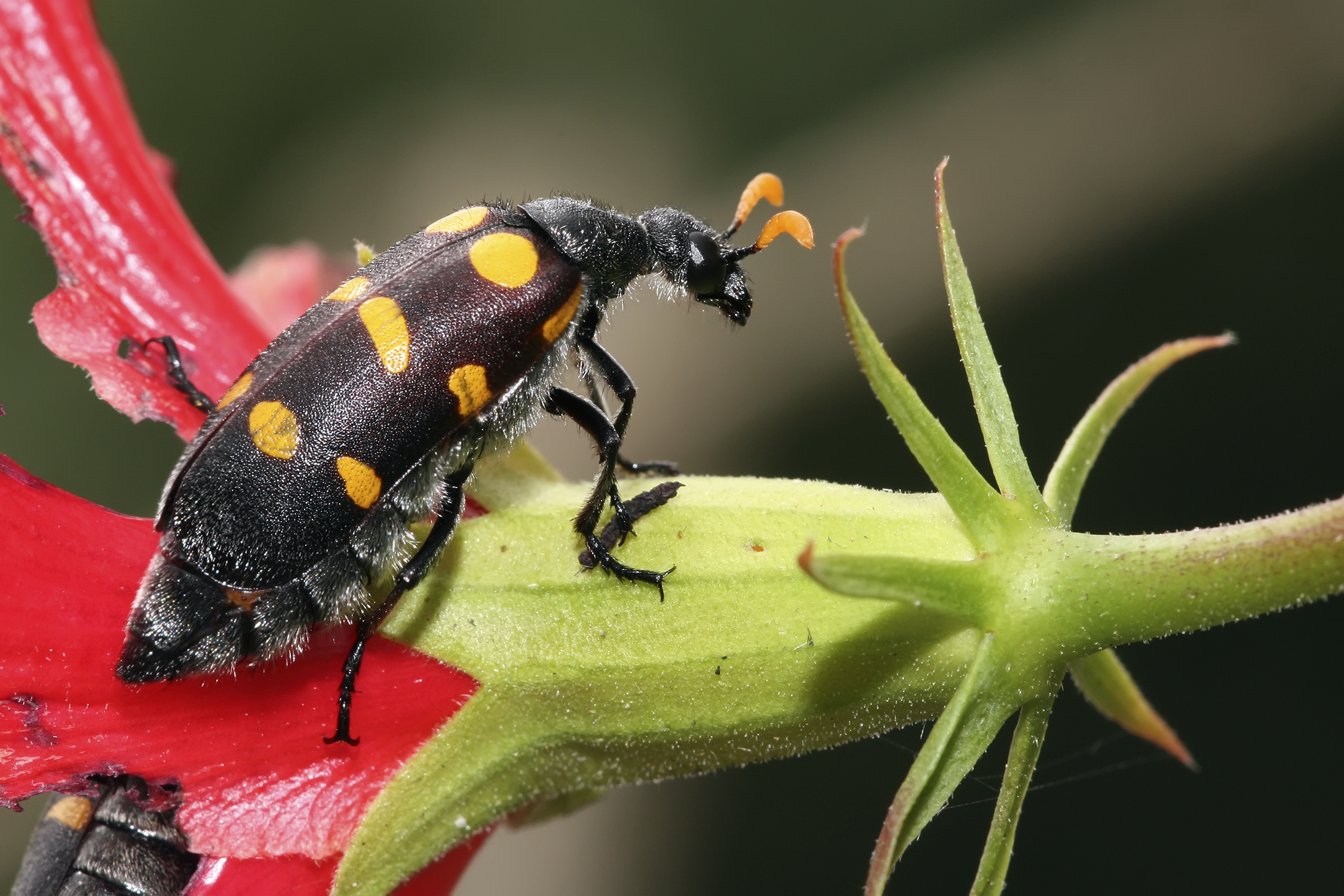
Hycleus lugens, an aposematically coloured beetle

Unpalatability, broadly understood, can be created in a variety of ways. Some insects such as the ladybird or tiger moth contain bitter-tasting chemicals, while the skunk produces a noxious odor, and the poison glands of the poison dart frog, the sting of a velvet ant or neurotoxin in a black widow spider make them dangerous or painful to attack. Tiger moths advertise their unpalatability by either producing ultrasonic noises which warn bats to avoid them, or by warning postures which expose brightly coloured body parts (see Unkenreflex), or exposing eyespots. Velvet ants (actually parasitic wasps) such as Dasymutilla occidentalis both have bright colours and produce audible noises when grabbed (via stridulation), which serve to reinforce the warning. Giant velvet mites (Dinothrombium spp.) have a foul taste and are also protected by a tough integument that is difficult to puncture. Among mammals, predators can be dissuaded when a smaller animal is aggressive and able to defend itself, as for example in honey badgers.

== Prevalence ==
=== In terrestrial ecosystems ===
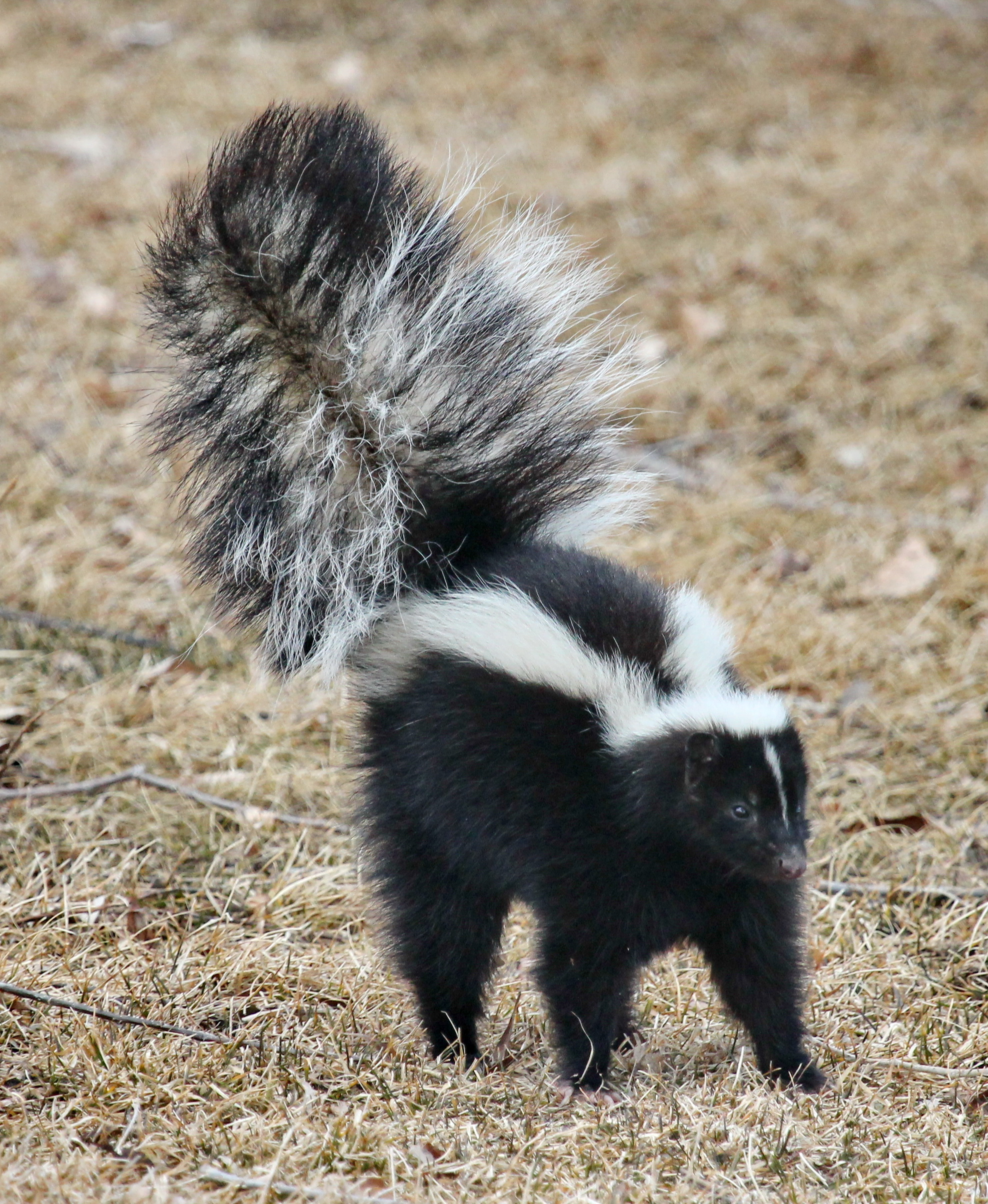
Skunk, Mephitis mephitis, advertising its powerful defences, scent glands near the tail, by raising its tail and displaying its warning coloration

Aposematism is widespread in insects but less so in vertebrates, in which it is confined primarily to a smaller number of reptile, amphibian, and fish species, as well as some foul-smelling or aggressive mammals. Pitohuis, red and black birds whose toxic feathers and skin apparently comes from the poisonous beetles they ingest, may also be included. It has been proposed that aposematism played a role in human evolution, with body odour carrying a warning to predators of large hominins able to defend themselves with weapons.

Perhaps the most numerous aposematic vertebrates are the poison dart frogs (family: Dendrobatidae). These neotropical anuran amphibians exhibit a wide spectrum of coloration and toxicity. Some species in this poison frog family (particularly Dendrobates, Epipedobates, and Phyllobates) are conspicuously coloured and sequester one of the most toxic alkaloids present in living species. In the same family there are also cryptic frogs (such as Colostethus and Mannophryne) that lack these toxic alkaloids. Although these frogs display an extensive array of coloration and toxicity, there is very little genetic difference between the species. Evolution of their conspicuous coloration is correlated to traits such as chemical defence, dietary specialisation, acoustic diversification, and increased body mass.

Some plants are thought to employ aposematism to warn herbivores of unpalatable chemicals or physical defences such as prickled leaves or thorns. Many insects, such as cinnabar moth caterpillars, acquire toxic chemicals from their host plants. Among mammals, skunks and zorillas advertise their foul-smelling chemical defences with sharply contrasting black-and-white patterns on their fur, while the similarly-patterned badger and honey badger advertise their sharp claws, powerful jaws, and aggressive natures. Some brightly coloured birds such as passerines with contrasting patterns may also be aposematic, at least in females; but because male birds are often brightly coloured through sexual selection, and their coloration is not correlated with edibility, it is unclear whether aposematism is significant.

The sound-producing rattle of rattlesnakes is an acoustic form of aposematism. Sound production by the caterpillar of the Polyphemus moth, Antheraea polyphemus, may similarly be acoustic aposematism, connected to and preceded by chemical defences. Similar acoustic defences exist in a range of Bombycoidea caterpillars.

=== In marine ecosystems ===
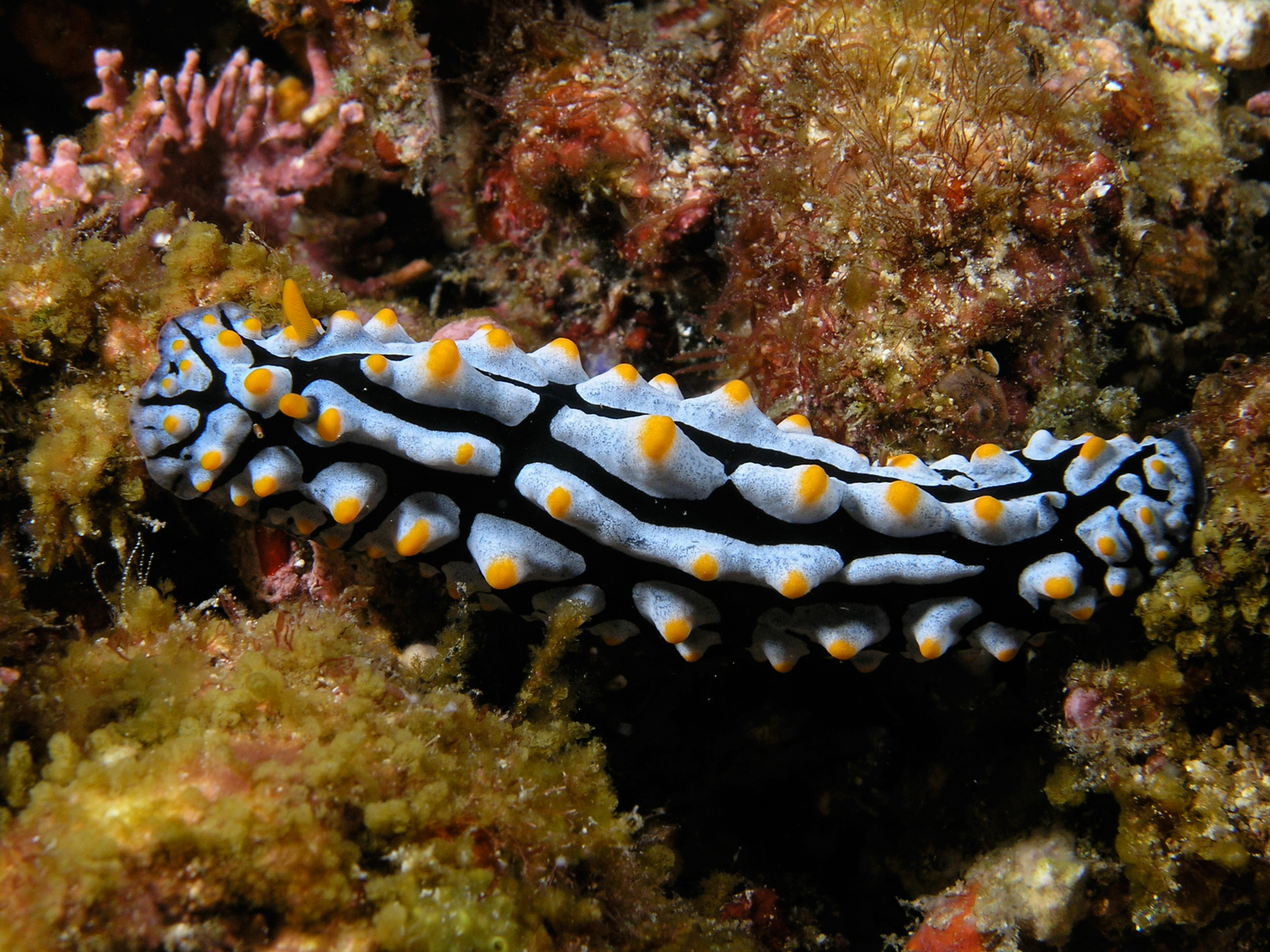
There is evidence that a range of marine animals, including nudibranchs like Phyllidia varicosa, are aposematic.

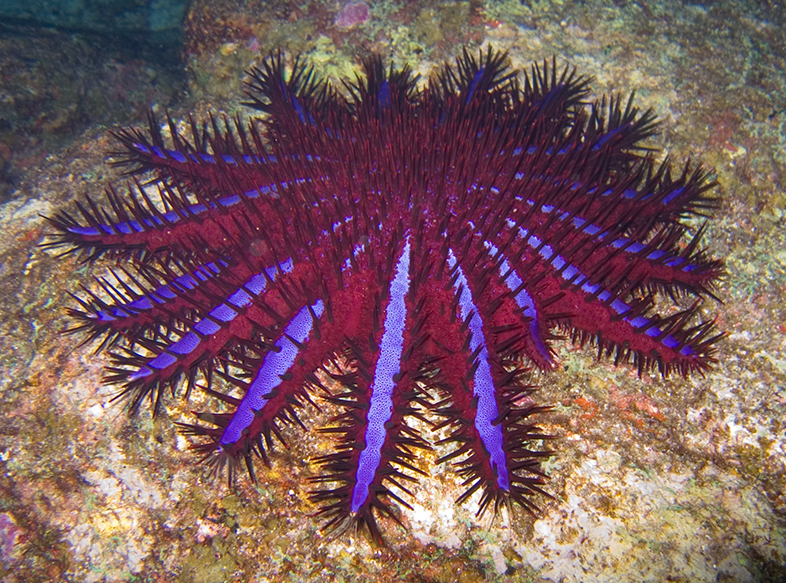
Conspicuous colours of crown-of-thorns starfish spines may warn of strong toxins within.

The existence of aposematism in marine ecosystems has been debated. Many marine organisms, particularly those on coral reefs, are brightly coloured or patterned, including sponges, corals, molluscs, and fish, with little or no connection to chemical or physical defences. Caribbean reef sponges are brightly coloured, and many species are full of toxic chemicals, but there is no statistical relationship between the two factors.

Nudibranch molluscs are the most commonly cited examples of aposematism in marine ecosystems, but the evidence for this has been contested, mostly because (1) there are few examples of mimicry among species, (2) many species are nocturnal or cryptic, and (3) bright colours at the red end of the colour spectrum are rapidly attenuated as a function of water depth. For example, the Spanish Dancer nudibranch (genus Hexabranchus), among the largest of tropical marine slugs, potently chemically defended, and brilliantly red and white, is nocturnal and has no known mimics.

Mimicry is to be expected, since Batesian mimics with weak defences can gain a measure of protection from their resemblance to aposematic species. Other studies have concluded that nudibranchs such as the slugs of the family Phyllidiidae from Indo-Pacific coral reefs are aposematically coloured. Müllerian mimicry has been implicated in the coloration of some Mediterranean nudibranchs, all of which derive defensive chemicals from their sponge diet.

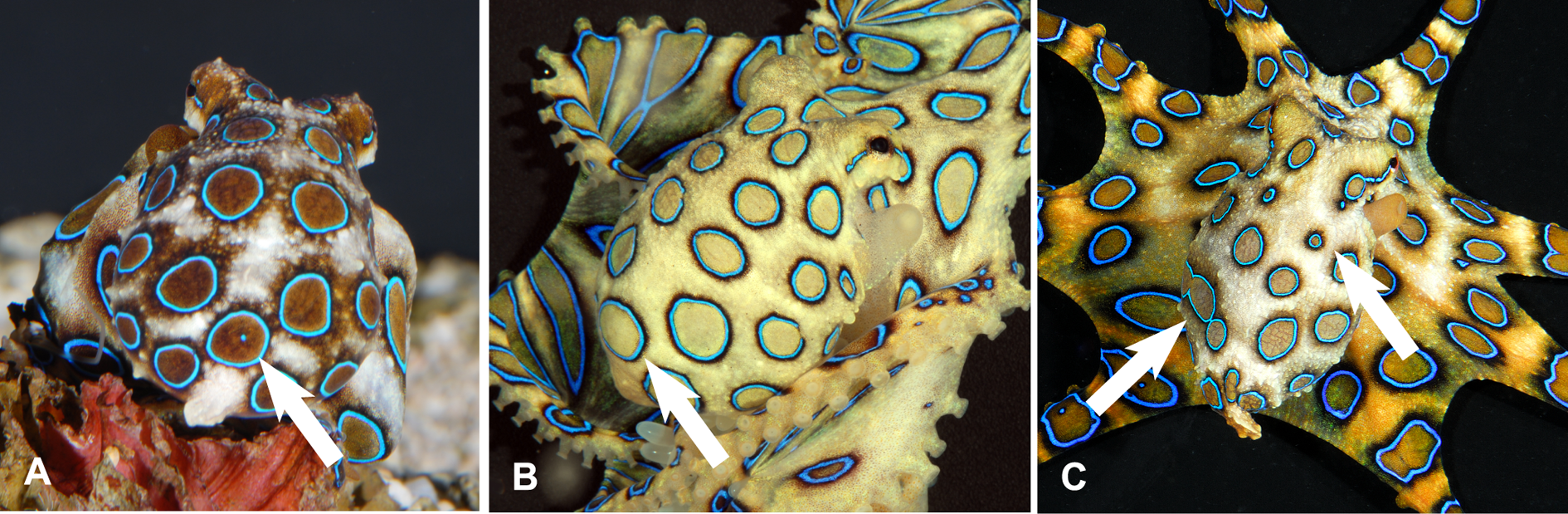
Iridescent blue rings on the mantles of the venomous octopus Hapalochlaena lunulata are considered by some to be aposematic.

The crown-of-thorns starfish, like other starfish such as Metrodira subulata, has conspicuous coloration and conspicuous long, sharp spines, as well as cytolytic saponins, chemicals which could function as an effective defence; this evidence is argued to be sufficient for such species to be considered aposematic.

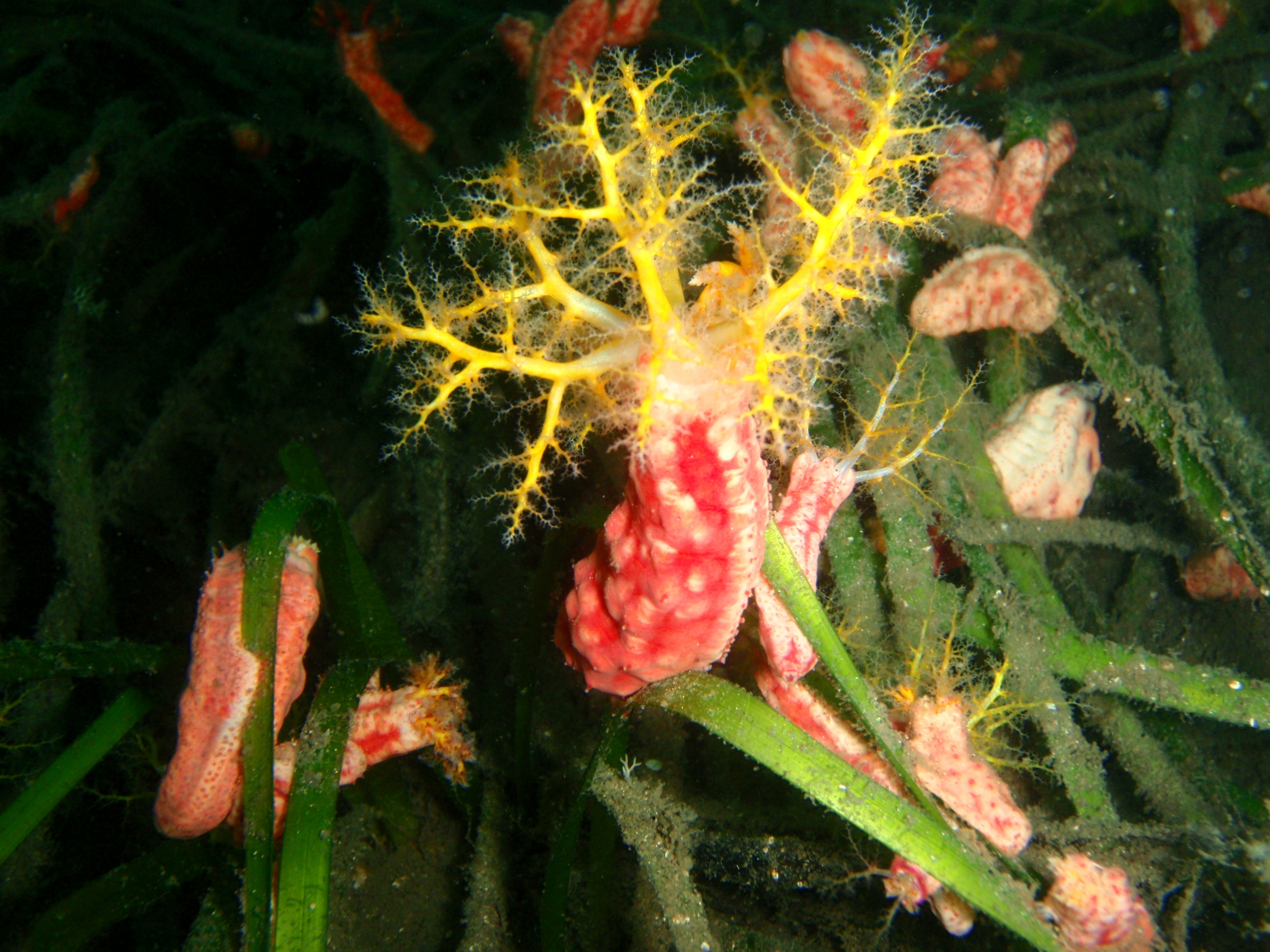
The pink warty sea cucumber, Cercodemas anceps, provides both chromatic and achromatic signals to predators, and both of these independently have an aposematic effect.

It has been proposed that aposematism and mimicry are less evident in marine invertebrates than terrestrial insects because predation is a more intense selective force for many insects, which disperse as adults rather than as larvae and have much shorter generation times. There is evidence that fish predators such as blueheads may adapt to visual cues more rapidly than do birds, making mimicry less effective. However, there is experimental evidence that pink warty sea cucumbers are aposematic, and that the honest signals, both chromatic and achromatic, that they provide to predators each independently reduce the rate of attack.

Blue-ringed octopuses are venomous. They spend much of their time hiding in crevices whilst displaying effective camouflage patterns with their dermal chromatophore cells. However, if they are provoked, they quickly change colour, becoming bright yellow with each of the 50-60 rings flashing bright iridescent blue within a third of a second. It is often stated this is an aposematic warning display, but the hypothesis has rarely if ever been tested.

=== In freshwater ecosystems ===
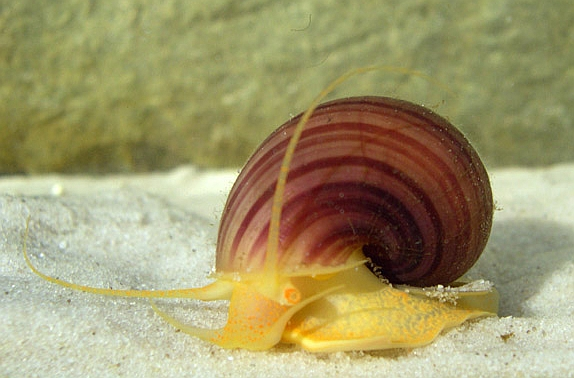
Freshwater Pomacea apple snails from South America have toxic, brightly-coloured eggs.

Aposematism in freshwater animals was demonstrated in 2026 in four species of Pomacea apple snails from South America, which have brightly-coloured eggs. One clade uses orange and yellow carotenes and xanthophylls; another uses red xanthophylls. The albumen gland in the eggs contains perivitellins, proteins that are antidigestive, antinutritive, and neurotoxic.

== Behaviour ==
The mechanism of defence relies on the memory of the would-be predator; a bird that has once experienced a foul-tasting grasshopper will endeavor to avoid a repetition of the experience. As a consequence, aposematic species are often gregarious. Before the memory of a bad experience attenuates, the predator may have the experience reinforced through repetition. Aposematic organisms are often slow-moving, as they have little need for speed and agility. Instead, their morphology is frequently tough and resistant to injury, thereby allowing them to escape once the predator is warned off.

Aposematic species do not need to hide or stay still as cryptic organisms do, so aposematic individuals benefit from more freedom in exposed areas and can spend more time foraging, allowing them to find more and better quality food. They may make use of conspicuous mating displays, including vocal signals, which may then develop through sexual selection.

== Origins of the theory ==
Gregarious nymphs of an aposematic milkweed bug, Lygaeus sp.

=== Wallace, 1867 ===
In a letter to Alfred Russel Wallace dated 23 February 1867, Charles Darwin wrote, "On Monday evening I called on Bates & put a difficulty before him, which he could not answer, & as on some former similar occasion, his first suggestion was, 'you had better ask Wallace'. My difficulty is, why are caterpillars sometimes so beautifully & artistically coloured?" Darwin was puzzled because his theory of sexual selection (where members of one sex choose their mates based on how attractive they are) could not apply to caterpillars since they are immature and hence not sexually active.

Wallace replied the next day with the suggestion that since some caterpillars "are protected by a disagreeable taste or odour, it would be a positive advantage to them never to be mistaken for any of the palatable catterpillars [sic], because a slight wound such as would be caused by a peck of a bird's bill almost always I believe kills a growing catterpillar. Any gaudy & conspicuous colour therefore, that would plainly distinguish them from the brown & green eatable catterpillars, would enable birds to recognise them easily as ~~at~~ a kind not fit for food, & thus they would escape seizure which is as bad as being eaten."

Since Darwin was enthusiastic about the idea, Wallace asked the Entomological Society of London to test the hypothesis. In response, the entomologist John Jenner Weir conducted experiments with caterpillars and birds in his aviary, and in 1869 he provided the first experimental evidence for warning coloration in animals. The evolution of aposematism surprised 19th-century naturalists because the probability of its establishment in a population had been presumed to be low, since a conspicuous signal suggested a higher chance of predation.

=== Poulton, 1890 ===
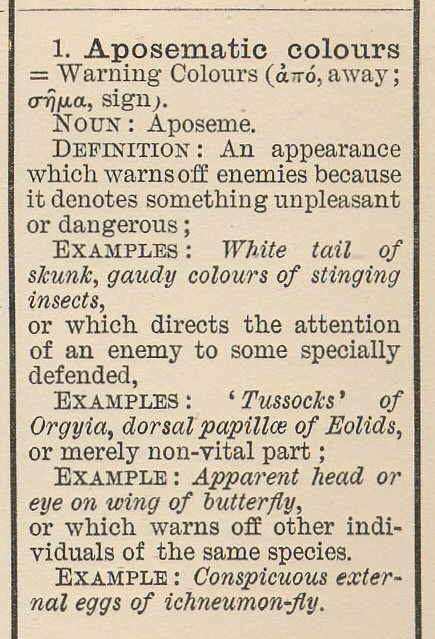
First edition of Edward Bagnall Poulton's The Colours of Animals, 1890, introduced a set of new terms for animal coloration including "aposematic".

Wallace coined the term "warning colours" in an article about animal coloration in 1877. In 1890 Edward Bagnall Poulton renamed the concept aposematism in his book The Colours of Animals. He described the derivation of the term as follows:

The second head (Sematic Colours) includes Warning Colours and Recognition Markings: the former warn an enemy off, and are therefore called Aposematic [Greek, apo, from, and sema, sign]

== Evolution ==
Aposematism is paradoxical in evolutionary terms, as it makes individuals conspicuous to predators, so they may be killed and the trait eliminated before predators learn to avoid it. If warning coloration puts the first few individuals at such a strong disadvantage, it would never last in the species long enough to become beneficial.

=== Supported explanations ===
There is evidence for explanations involving dietary conservatism, in which predators avoid new prey because it is an unknown quantity; this is a long-lasting effect. Dietary conservatism has been demonstrated experimentally in some species of birds and fish.

Further, birds recall and avoid objects that are both conspicuous and foul-tasting longer than objects that are equally foul-tasting but cryptically coloured. This suggests that Wallace's original view, that warning coloration helped to teach predators to avoid prey thus coloured, was correct. However, some birds (inexperienced starlings and domestic chicks) also innately avoid conspicuously coloured objects, as demonstrated using mealworms painted yellow and black to resemble wasps, with dull green controls. This implies that warning coloration works at least in part by stimulating the evolution of predators to encode the meaning of the warning signal, rather than by requiring each new generation to learn the signal's meaning. All of these results contradict the idea that novel, brightly coloured individuals would be more likely to be eaten or attacked by predators.

=== Alternative hypotheses ===
Other explanations are possible. Predators might innately fear unfamiliar forms (neophobia) long enough for them to become established, but this is likely to be only temporary.

Alternatively, prey animals might be sufficiently gregarious to form clusters tight enough to enhance the warning signal. If the species was already unpalatable, predators might learn to avoid the cluster, protecting gregarious individuals with the new aposematic trait. Gregariousness would assist predators to learn to avoid unpalatable, gregarious prey. Aposematism could also be favoured in dense populations even if these are not gregarious.

Another possibility is that a gene for aposematism might be recessive and located on the X chromosome. If so, predators would learn to associate the colour with unpalatability from males with the trait, while heterozygous females carry the trait until it becomes common and predators understand the signal. Well-fed predators might also ignore aposematic morphs, preferring other prey species.

A further explanation is that females might prefer males that are more brightly-coloured, so sexual selection could result in aposematic males having higher reproductive success than non-aposematic males if they can survive long enough to mate. Sexual selection is strong enough to allow seemingly maladaptive traits to persist despite other factors working against the trait.

Once aposematic individuals reach a certain threshold population, for whatever reason, the predator learning process would be spread out over a larger number of individuals and therefore is less likely to wipe out the trait for warning coloration completely. If the population of aposematic individuals all originated from the same few individuals, the predator learning process would result in a stronger warning signal for surviving kin, resulting in higher inclusive fitness for the dead or injured individuals through kin selection.

A theory for the evolution of aposematism posits that it arises by reciprocal selection between predators and prey, where distinctive features in prey, which could be visual or chemical, are selected by non-discriminating predators, and where, concurrently, avoidance of distinctive prey is selected by predators. Concurrent reciprocal selection (CRS) may entail learning by predators or it may give rise to unlearned avoidances by them. Aposematism arising by CRS operates without special conditions of the gregariousness or the relatedness of prey, and it is not contingent upon predator sampling of prey to learn that aposematic cues are associated with unpalatability or other unprofitable features.

== Mimicry ==
Aposematism has influenced the evolution of both aposematic and non-aposematic species. Non-aposematic species have often evolved to mimic the conspicuous markings of their aposematic counterparts. For example, the hornet moth is a deceptive mimic of the yellowjacket wasp; it resembles the wasp, but has no sting. A predator which avoids the wasp will to some degree also avoid the moth. This is known as Batesian mimicry, after Henry Walter Bates, a British naturalist who studied Amazonian butterflies in the second half of the 19th century. Batesian mimicry is frequency dependent: it is most effective when the ratio of mimic to model is low; otherwise, predators will encounter the mimic too often.

A second form of mimicry occurs when two aposematic organisms share the same anti-predator adaptation and non-deceptively mimic each other, to the benefit of both species, since fewer individuals of either species need to be attacked for predators to learn to avoid both of them. This form of mimicry is known as Müllerian mimicry, after Fritz Müller, a German naturalist who studied the phenomenon in the Amazon in the late 19th century.

Many species of bee and wasp that occur together are Müllerian mimics. Their similar coloration teaches predators that a striped pattern is associated with being stung. Therefore, a predator which has had a negative experience with any such species will likely avoid any that resemble it in the future. Müllerian mimicry is found in vertebrates such as the mimic poison frog (Ranitomeya imitator) which has several morphs throughout its natural geographical range, each of which looks very similar to a different species of poison frog which lives in that area.

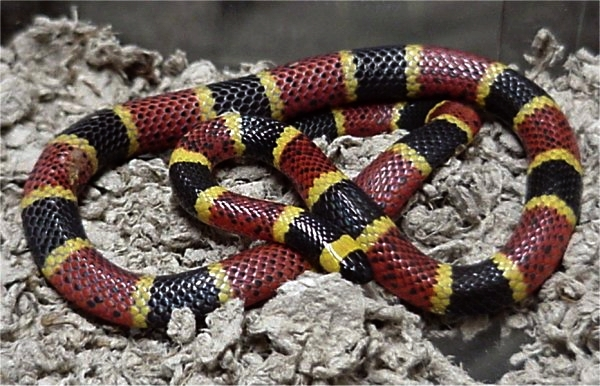
A model (to be mimicked), the venomous and genuinely aposematic coral snake

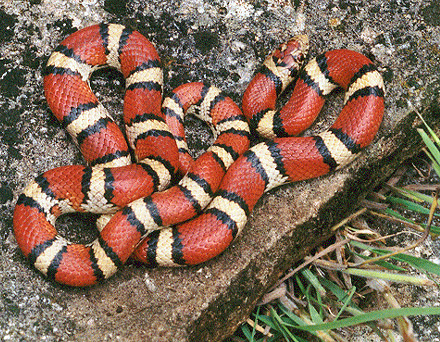
The harmless red milk snake, a Batesian mimic of the coral snake

== See also ==
- Handicap principle

== Sources ==
- Edmunds, Malcolm (1974). Defence in Animals. Longman. ISBN 978-0-582-44132-3.
- Poulton, Edward Bagnall (1890). The Colours of Animals, their meaning and use, especially considered in the case of insects. London: Kegan Paul, Trench & Trübner.
- Ruxton, Graeme D.; Sherratt, T. N.; Speed, M. P. (2004). Avoiding Attack: The Evolutionary Ecology of Crypsis, Warning Signals and Mimicry. Oxford University Press. ISBN 978-0-19-852859-3.
