= Countershading =

Camouflage to counteract self-shading

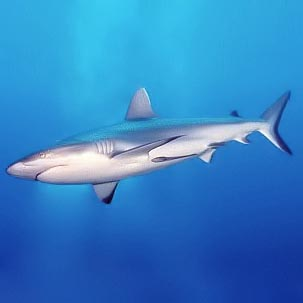
Many animals, such as this grey reef shark, are countershaded.

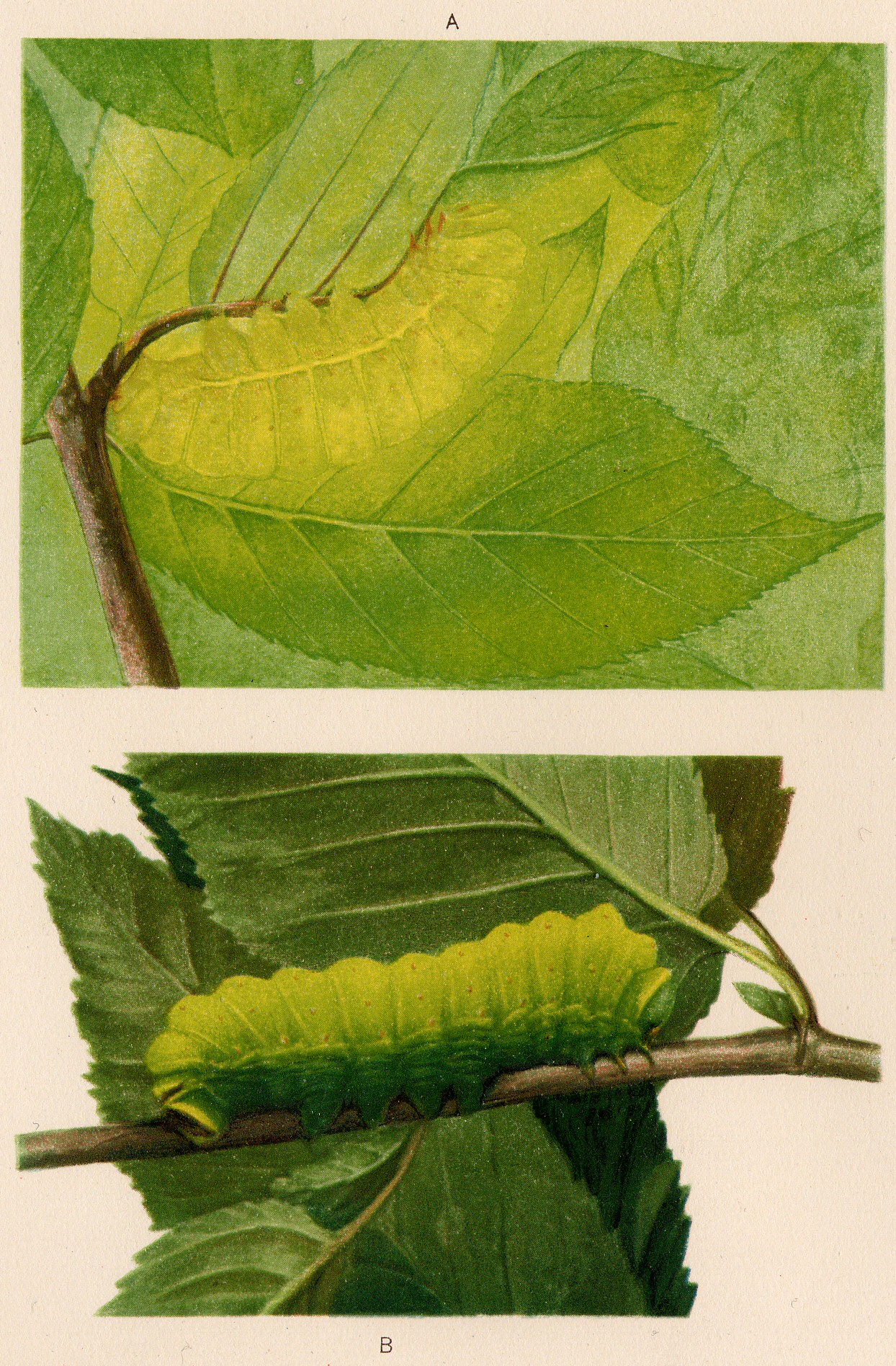
Illustration from the artist Abbot Thayer's 1909 book on camouflage of a Luna caterpillar Actias luna a) in position b) inverted.

Countershading, or Thayer's law, is a method of camouflage in which an animal's coloration is darker on the top or upper side and lighter on the underside of the body. This pattern is found in many species of mammals, reptiles, birds, fish, and insects, both in predators and in prey.

When light falls from above on a uniformly coloured three-dimensional object such as a sphere, it makes the upper side appear lighter and the underside darker, grading from one to the other. This pattern of light and shade makes the object appear solid, and therefore easier to detect. The classical form of countershading, discovered in 1909 by the artist Abbott Handerson Thayer, works by counterbalancing the effects of self-shadowing, again typically with grading from dark to light. In theory this could be useful for military camouflage, but in practice it has rarely been applied, despite the best efforts of Thayer and, later, in the Second World War, of the zoologist Hugh Cott.

The precise function of various patterns of animal coloration that have been called countershading has been debated by zoologists such as Hannah Rowland (2009), with the suggestion that there may be multiple functions including flattening and background matching when viewed from the side; background matching when viewed from above or below, implying separate colour schemes for the top and bottom surfaces; outline obliteration from above; and a variety of other largely untested non-camouflage theories. A related mechanism, counter-illumination, adds the creation of light by bioluminescence or lamps to match the actual brightness of a background. Counter-illumination camouflage is common in marine organisms such as squid. It has been studied up to the prototype stage for military use in ships and aircraft, but it too has rarely or never been used in warfare.

The reverse of countershading, with the belly pigmented darker than the back, enhances contrast and so makes animals more conspicuous. It is found in animals that can defend themselves, such as skunks. The pattern is used both in startle or deimatic displays and as a signal to warn off experienced predators. However, animals that habitually live upside-down but lack strong defences, such as the Nile catfish and the luna moth caterpillar, have upside-down countershading for camouflage.

== Early research ==
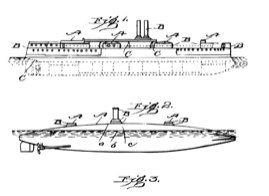
Thayer's 1902 patent application. He failed to convince the US Navy.

The English zoologist Edward Bagnall Poulton, author of The Colours of Animals (1890) discovered the countershading of various insects, including the pupa or chrysalis of the purple emperor butterfly, Apatura iris, the caterpillar larvae of the brimstone moth, Opisthograptis luteolata (Note: It was called Rumia crataegata at the time.) and of the peppered moth, Biston betularia. (Note: It was called Amphidasis betularia at the time.) However he did not use the term countershading, nor did he suggest that the effect occurred widely.

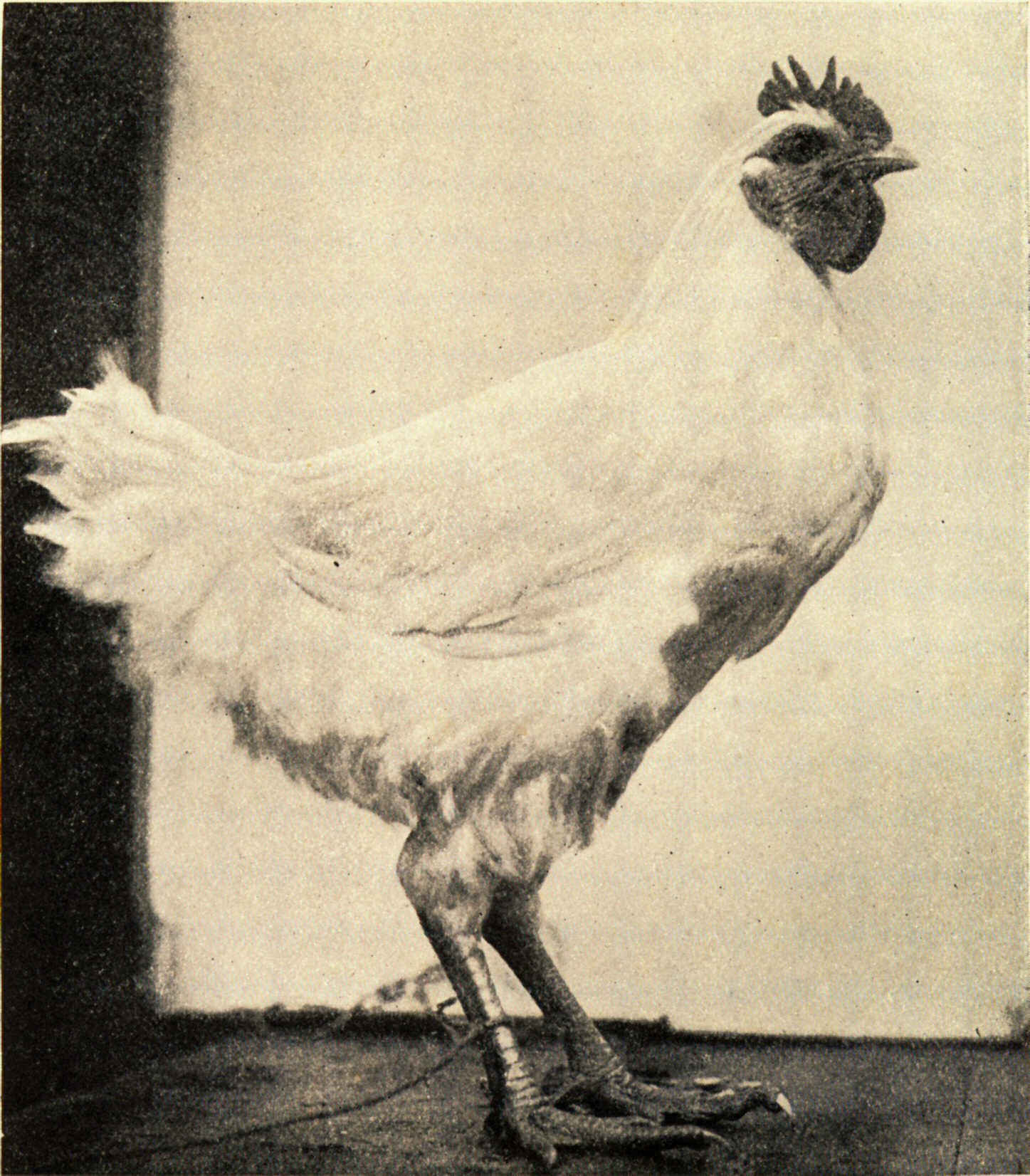
Thayer's "White fowl, lacking counter-shading, against a flat white cloth."

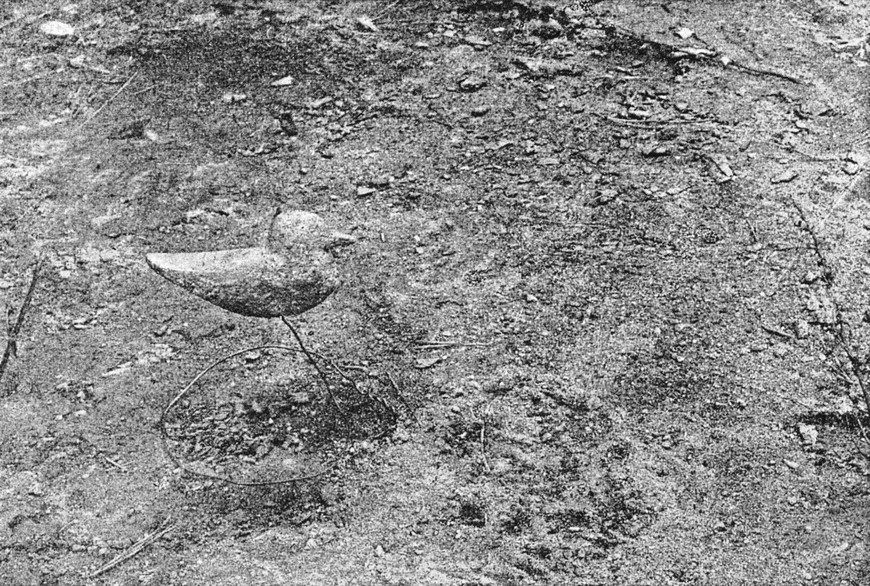
A 1917 photograph of a countershading study by Thayer, who became obsessed by the mistaken idea that all animals are countershaded.

The New Hampshire artist Abbott Handerson Thayer was one of the first to study and write about countershading. In his 1909 book Concealing-Coloration in the Animal Kingdom, he correctly described and illustrated countershading with photographs and paintings, but wrongly claimed that almost all animals are countershaded. For this reason countershading is sometimes called Thayer's law. Thayer wrote:

Animals are painted by Nature darkest on those parts which tend to be most lighted by the sky's light, and vice versa. ... the fact that a vast majority of creatures of the whole animal kingdom wear this gradation, developed to an exquisitely minute degree, and are famous for being hard to see in their homes, speaks for itself.

— Thayer

Thayer observed and painted a number of examples, including the Luna moth caterpillar Actias luna, both in its habitual upside-down feeding position, where its countershading makes it appear flat, and artificially inverted from that position, where sunlight and its inverted countershading combine to make it appear heavily shaded and therefore solid. Thayer obtained a patent in 1902 to paint warships, both submarines and surface ships, using countershading, but failed to convince the US Navy to adopt his ideas.

Hugh Bamford Cott in his 1940 book Adaptive Coloration in Animals described many instances of countershading, following Thayer in general approach but criticising Thayer's excessive claim ("He says 'All patterns and colors whatsoever of all animals that ever prey or are preyed upon are under certain normal circumstances obliterative.'") that effectively all animals are camouflaged with countershading. Cott called this "Thayer straining the theory to a fantastic extreme".

Both Thayer and Cott included in their books photographs of a non-countershaded white cockerel against a white background, to make the point that in Thayer's words "a monochrome object can not be 'obliterated', no matter what its background" or in Cott's words "Colour resemblance alone is not sufficient to afford concealment". Cott explained that

Contrary to what might have been expected by any one lacking in artistic perception, the bird appears highly conspicuous, the back looking lighter, and the breast darker, than the background, although in actual fact, back, background and breast are all pure white."

== Application ==
=== In animals ===
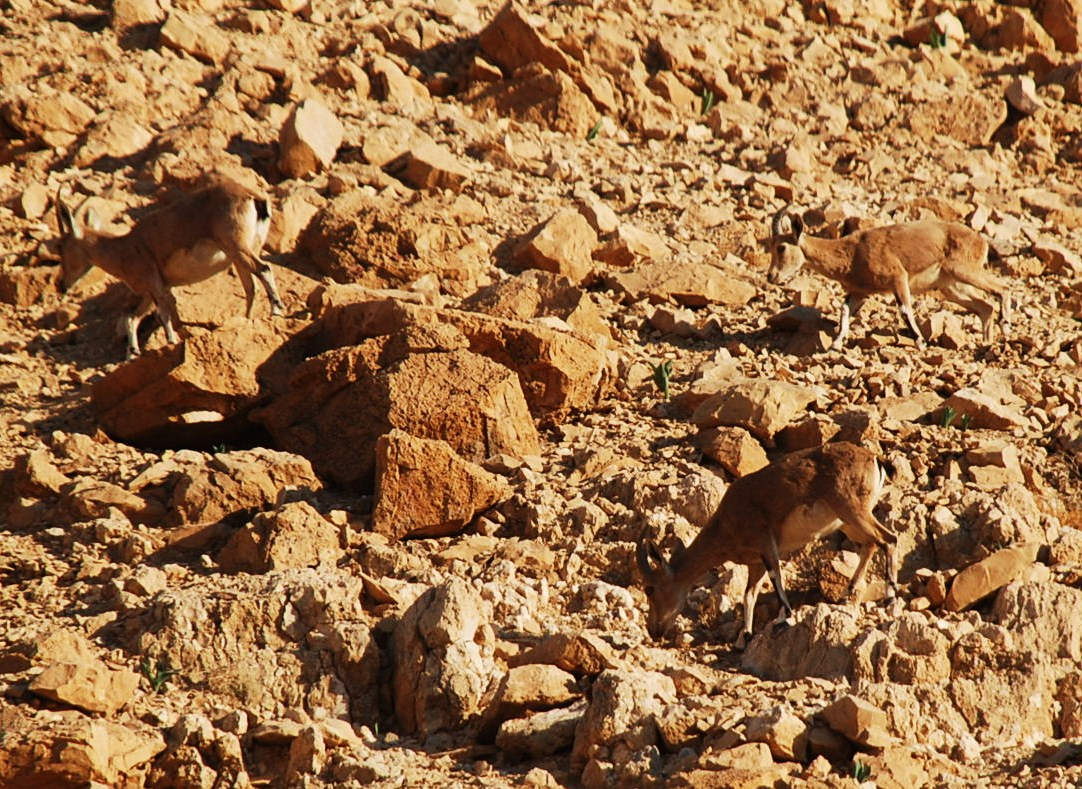
Ibexes are effectively flattened by countershading, making them nearly invisible against a desert background. There are three in the image.

Countershading is observed in a wide range of animal groups, both terrestrial, such as deer, and marine, such as sharks. It is the basis of camouflage in both predators and prey. It is used alongside other forms of camouflage including colour matching and disruptive coloration. Among predatory fish, the gray snapper, Lutianus griseus, is effectively flattened by its countershading, while it hunts an "almost invisible" prey, the hardhead silverside, Atherina laticeps which swims over greyish sands. Other countershaded marine animals include blue shark, herring, and dolphin; while fish such as the mackerel and sergeant fish are both countershaded and patterned with stripes or spots.

It tones the canvas on which are painted the Leopard's spots, the Tiger's stripes ... It is the dress almost universally worn by rodents... It is the essential uniform adopted by Conies, Asses, Antelopes, Deer ... It is repeated extensively among the marsupials ... It provides a basic livery for the great majority of snakes, lizards, and amphibians. Among insects it reaches a fine state of perfection in different caterpillars and grasshoppers. ... It is, however, in rivers, and in the surface waters of the sea, that countershading reaches its maximum development and significance.

— Hugh Cott

Mesozoic marine reptiles had countershading. Fossilised skin pigmented with dark-coloured eumelanin reveals that ichthyosaurs, leatherback turtles and mosasaurs had dark backs and light bellies. The ornithischian dinosaur Psittacosaurus similarly appears to have been countershaded, implying that its predators detected their prey by deducing shape from shading. Modelling suggests further that the dinosaur was optimally countershaded for a closed habitat such as a forest.

=== Counter-illumination ===
Another form of animal camouflage uses bioluminescence to increase the average brightness of an animal to match the brightness of the background. This is called counter-illumination. It is common in mid-water pelagic fish and invertebrates especially squid. It makes the counter-illuminated animal practically invisible to predators viewing it from below. As such, counter-illumination camouflage can be seen as an extension beyond what countershading can achieve. Where countershading only paints out shadows, counter-illumination can add in actual lights, permitting effective camouflage in changing conditions, including where the background is bright enough to make an animal that is not counter-illuminated appear as a shadow.

=== Military ===
Countershading, like counter-illumination, has rarely been applied in practice for military camouflage, though not because military authorities were unaware of it. Both Abbott Thayer in the First World War and Hugh Cott in the Second World War proposed countershading to their countries' armed forces. They each demonstrated the effectiveness of countershading, without succeeding in persuading their armed forces to adopt the technique, though they influenced military adoption of camouflage in general.

Cott was a protege of John Graham Kerr who had quarrelled with Norman Wilkinson in the First World War about dazzle camouflage for ships. Wilkinson remained influential in 1939 as an inspector of camouflage, so a political argument developed. Cott was invited to camouflage a 12-inch rail-mounted gun, alongside a similar gun camouflaged conventionally. Cott carefully combined disruptive contrast to break up the gun barrel's outlines with countershading to flatten out its appearance as a solid cylinder. The guns were then photographed from the air from various angles, and in Peter Forbes's view "the results were remarkable." Cott's gun is "invisible except to the most minute scrutiny by someone who knows exactly where to look and what to look for. The other gun is always highly visible." The authorities hesitated, appearing to be embarrassed by the evidence that Cott was right, and argued that countershading would be too difficult to use as an expert zoologist would be needed to supervise every installation. Cott was posted to the Middle East, and Kerr unsuccessfully intervened, pleading for guns to be painted Cott's way and Cott to be brought home.

The Australian zoologist William Dakin in his 1941 book The Art of Camouflage followed Thayer in describing countershading in some detail, and the book was reprinted as a military handbook in 1942. Dakin photographed model birds, much as Thayer and Cott had done, and argued that the shoulders and arms of battledress should be countershaded.

Countershading was described in the US War Department's 1943 Principles of Camouflage, where after four paragraphs of theory and one on its use in nature, the advice given is that:

Upper surfaces should be painted and textured so as to conform to the color and tone of the surrounding country (background) and the sides graded and toned from this to the white which the under surfaces and parts in shade should be painted.

Inventors have continued to advocate military usage of countershading, with for example a 2005 US patent for personal camouflage including countershading in the form of "statistical countercoloring" with varying sizes of rounded dark patches on a lighter ground.

Research by Ariel Tankus and Yehezkel Yeshurun investigating "camouflage breaking", the automated detection of objects such as tanks, showed that analysing images for convexity by looking for graded shadows can "break very strong camouflage, which might delude even human viewers." More precisely, images are searched for places where the gradient of brightness crosses zero, such as the line where a shadow stops becoming darker and starts to become lighter again. The technique defeated camouflage using disruption of edges, but the authors observed that animals with Thayer countershading are using "counter-measures to convexity based detectors", which implied "predators who use convexity based detectors."

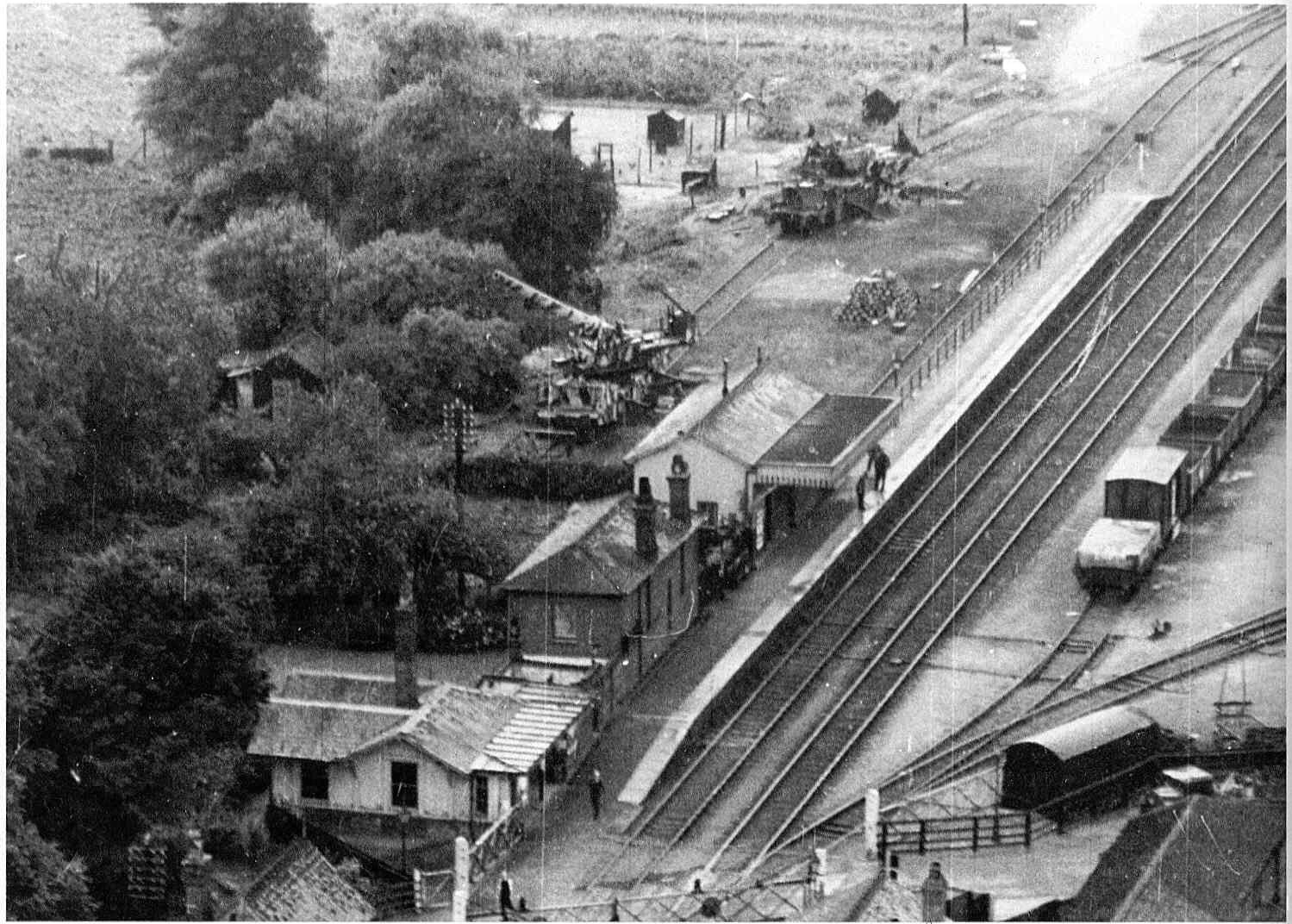
Rail-mounted guns countershaded by Hugh Cott (top) and conventionally camouflaged (middle), August 1940. The British authorities agreed Cott's countershading worked, but refused to adopt it.

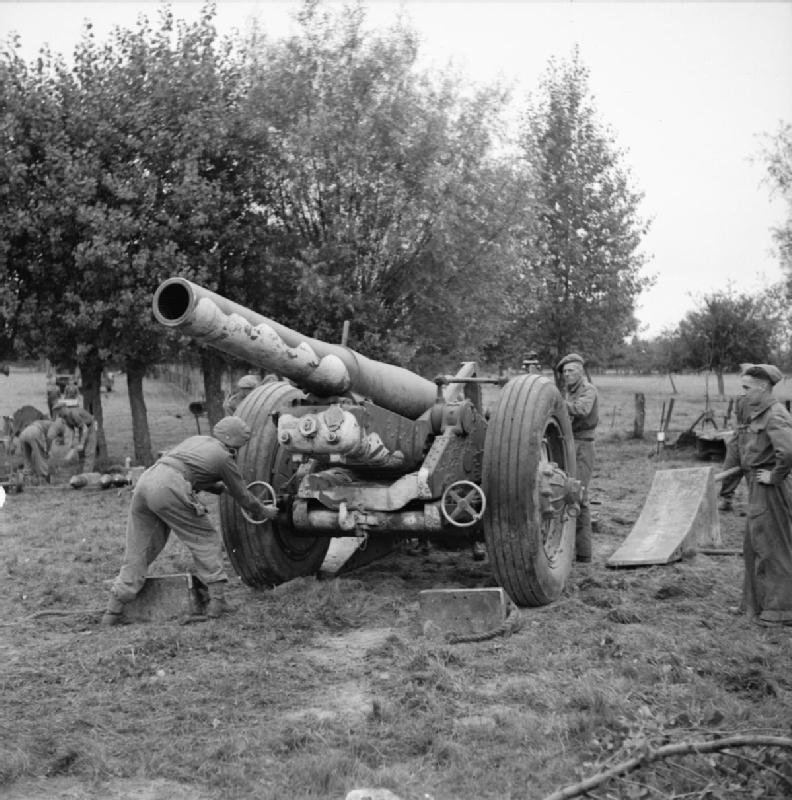
BL 7.2-inch howitzer with countershaded barrel, September 1944

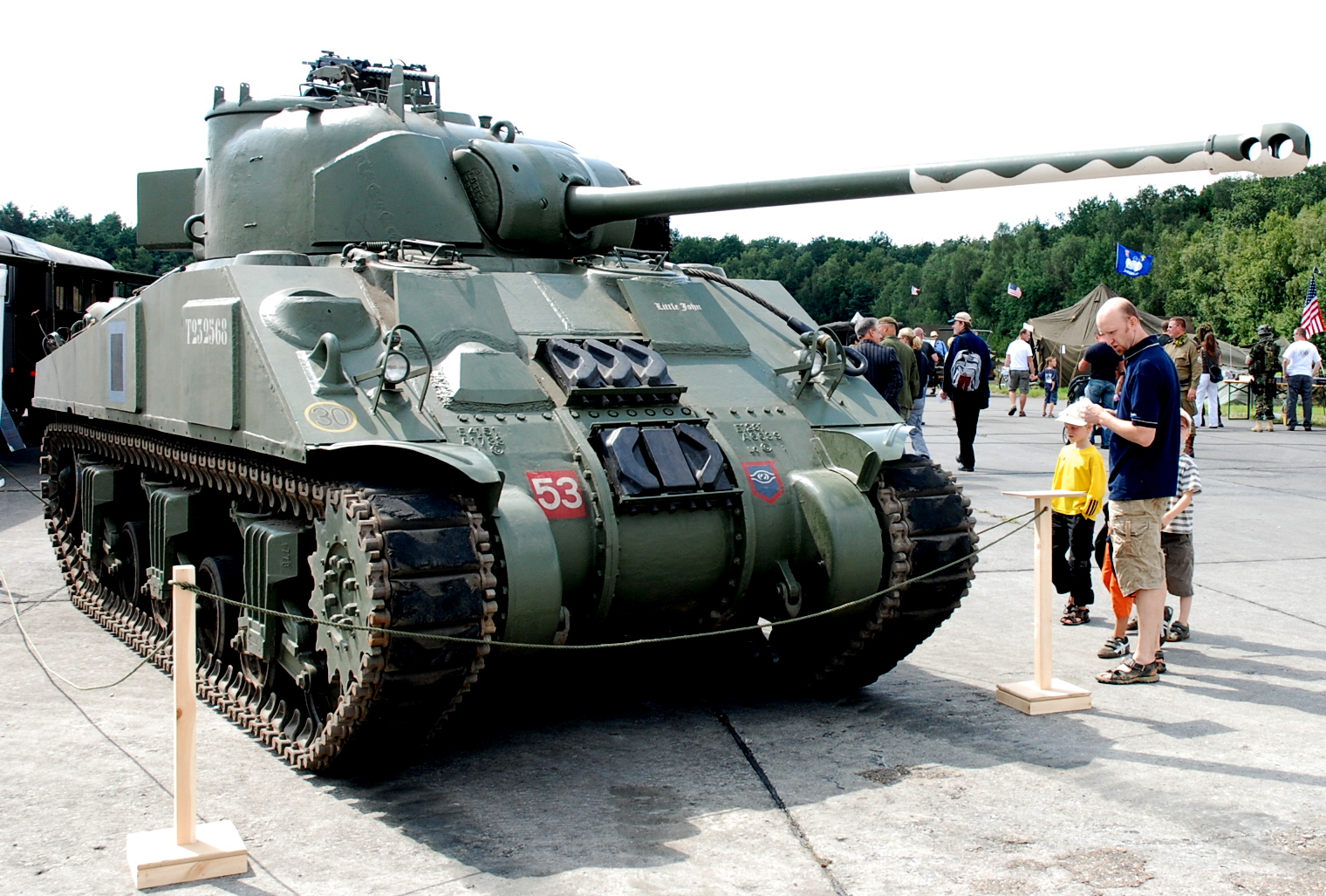
A preserved Sherman Firefly; its gun barrel is countershaded and disruptively patterned to disguise its length.

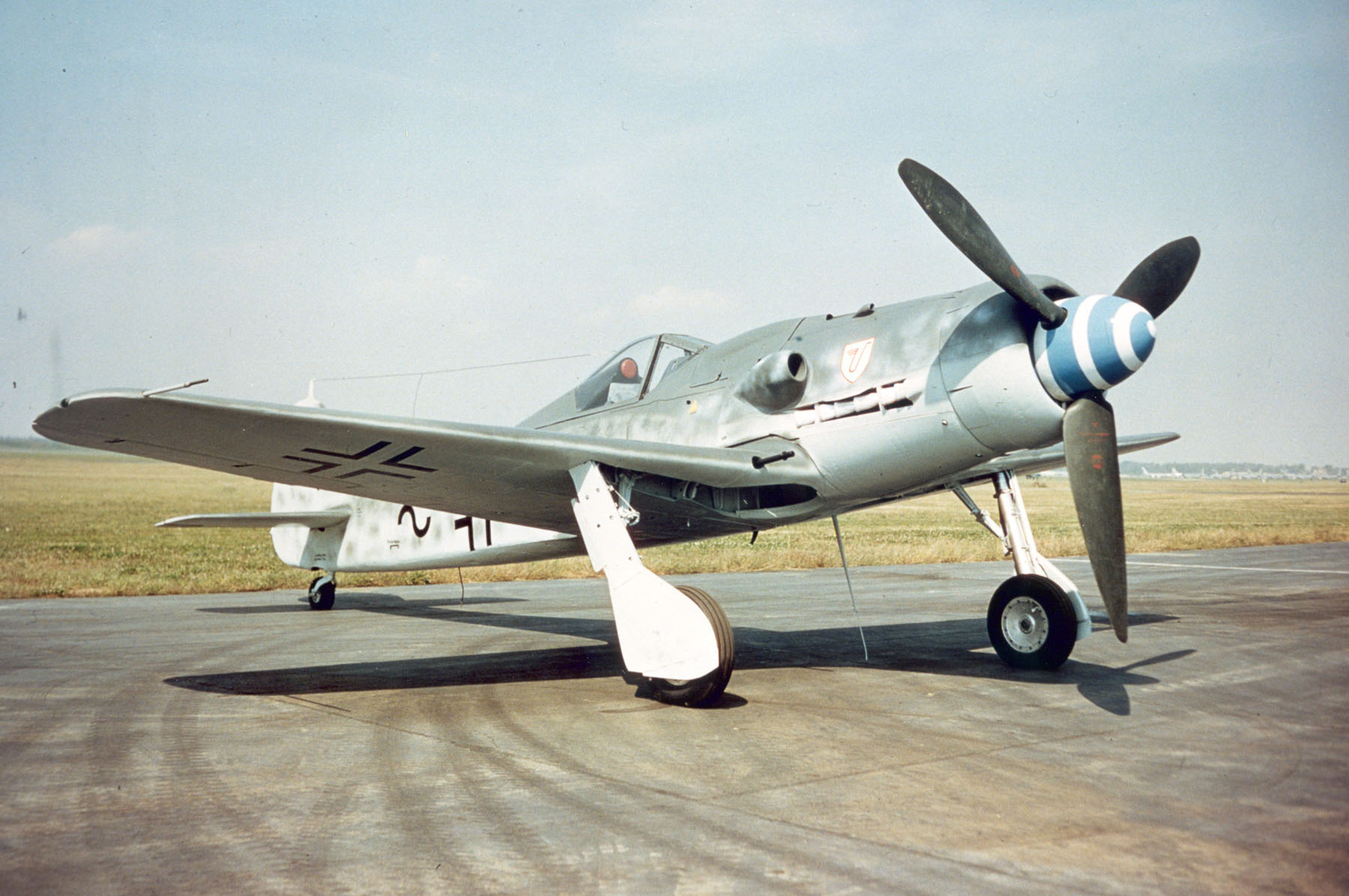
True (graduated from dark to light) countershaded Focke-Wulf Fw 190

== Function ==
Countershading acts as a form of camouflage by 'painting out' the self-shadowing of the body or object. The result is a 'flat' appearance, instead of the 'solid' appearance (with visual convexity) of the body before countershading.

Hannah Rowland, reviewing the subject 100 years after Abbott Thayer, observed that countershading, which she defines as "darker pigmentation on those surfaces exposed to the most lighting" is a common but poorly understood aspect of animal coloration. She noted there had been "much debate" about how countershading works. She considered the evidence for Thayer's theory that this acts as camouflage "by reducing ventral shadowing", and reviewed alternative explanations for countershading.

Camouflage theories of countershading, Rowland wrote, include "self-shadow concealment which results in improved background matching when viewed from the side"; "self-shadow concealment that flattens the form when viewed from the side"; "background matching when viewed from above or below"; and "body outline obliteration when viewed from above". These are examined in turn below.

=== Flattening and background matching when viewed from the side ===
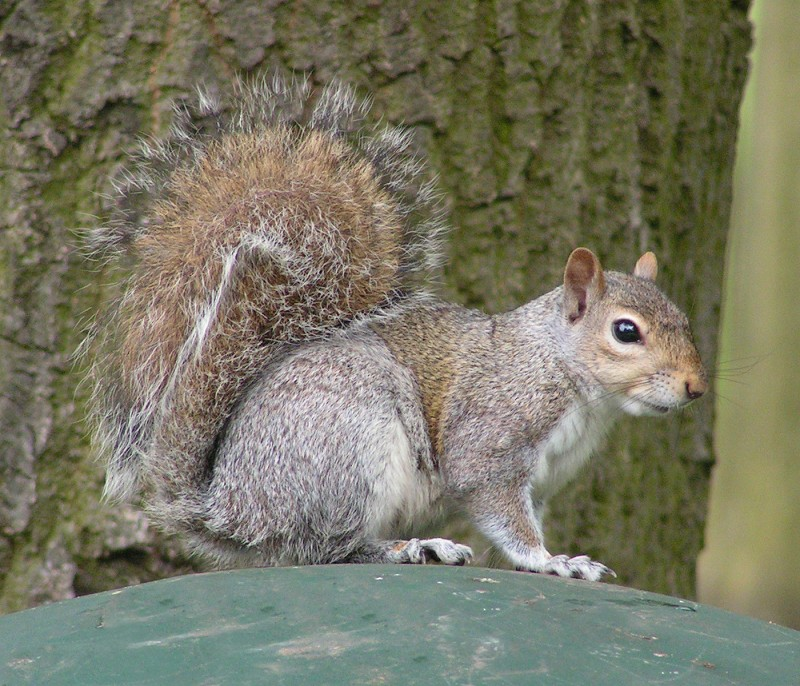
When oriented horizontally, the countershading of the eastern gray squirrel (Sciurus carolinensis) helps to "paint out" its ventral shadow.

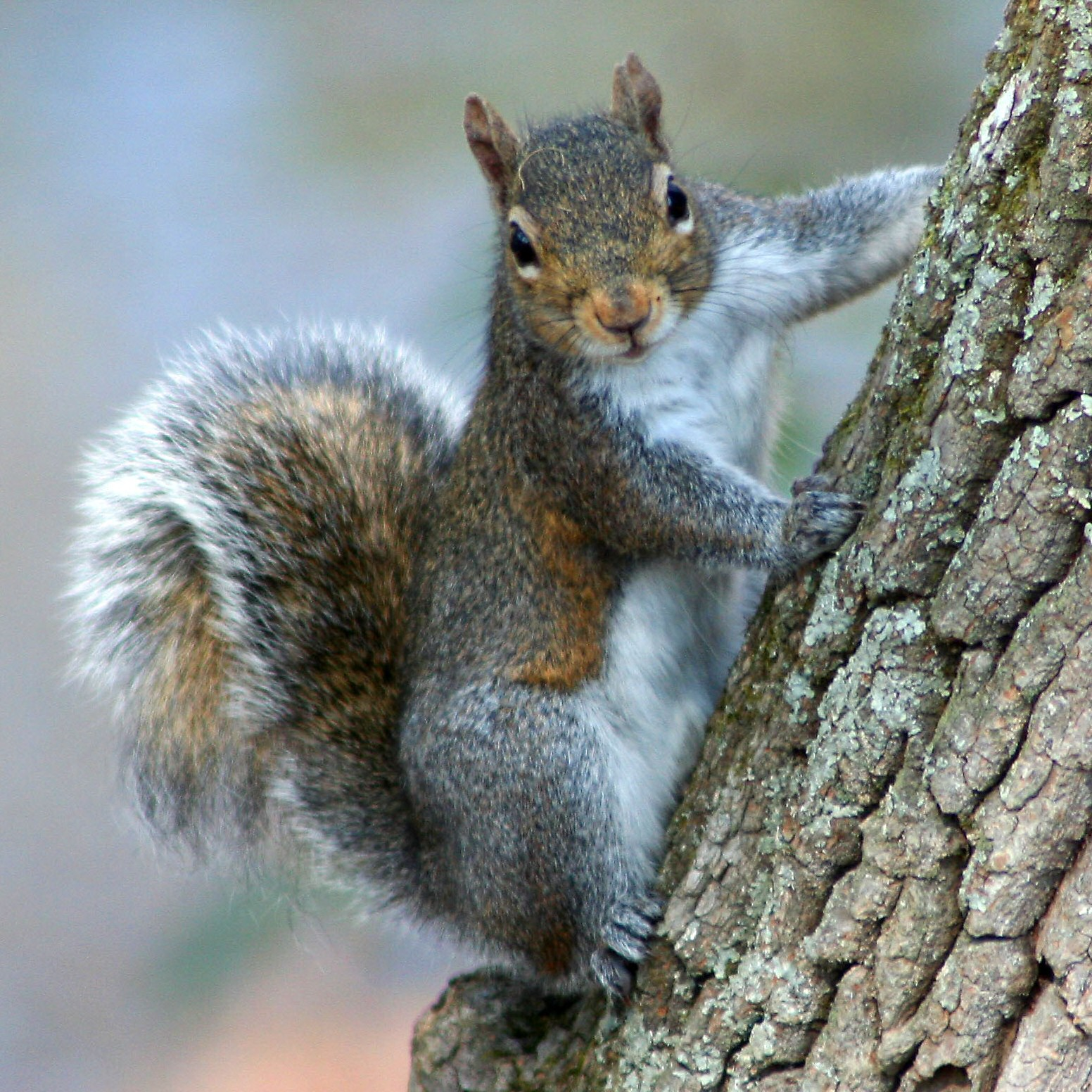
When oriented vertically, the squirrel's pale belly is conspicuous rather than camouflaged.

Cott, like Thayer, argued that countershading would make animals hard to see from the side, as they would "fade into a ghostly elusiveness". Rowland notes that Cott is here reviewing Thayer's theory and "reinforcing the view that a gradation in shading would act to eliminate the effects of ventral shadowing." Kiltie measured the effect of the countershading of the eastern gray squirrel, Sciurus carolinensis, showing that when the squirrel is horizontal the self-shadowing of the belly is partly concealed, but that when the squirrel is vertical (as when climbing a tree trunk) this effect did not occur.

Thayer's original argument, restated by Cott, was that nature did the exact opposite with countershading that an artist did with paint when creating the illusion of solid three-dimensionality, namely counteracting the effect of shade to flatten out form. Shading is a powerful cue used by animals in different phyla to identify the shapes of objects. Research with chicks showed that they preferred to peck at grains with shadows falling below them (as if illuminated from above), so both humans and birds may make use of shading as a depth cue.

=== Background matching from above or below ===
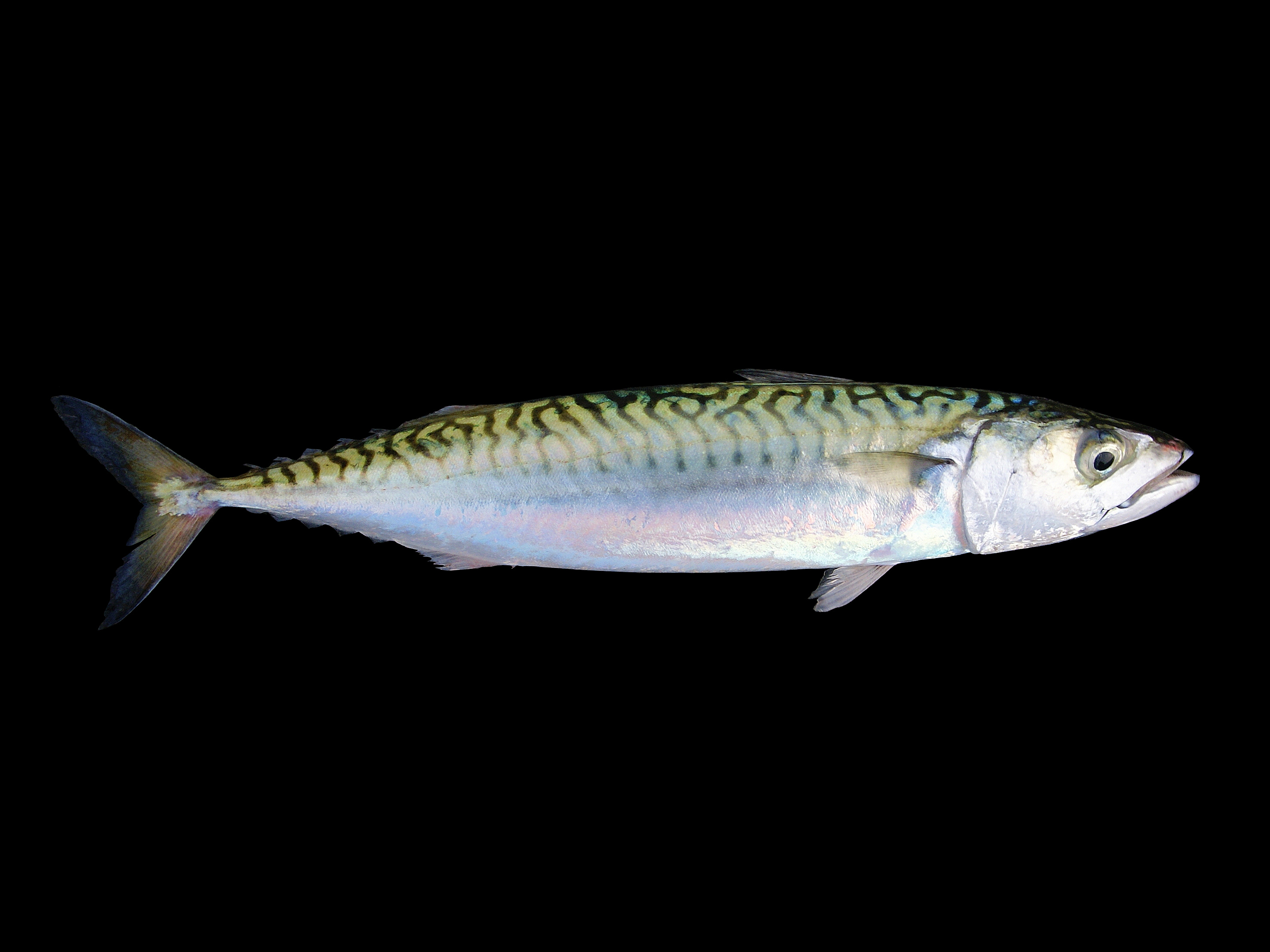
The mackerel, Scomber scombrus, like many pelagic fish, is dark above, pale below, camouflaging it against the ocean depths and the bright surface. (Note: The mackerel, like many other pelagic fish, is also camouflaged by silvering, and when seen from above it has a bold disruptive pattern.)

A completely different function of animal (and military vehicle) coloration is to camouflage the top and bottom surfaces differently, to match their backgrounds below and above respectively. This was noted, for example, by Frank Evers Beddard in 1892:

Among pelagic fish it is common to find the upper surface dark-coloured and the lower surface white, so that the animal is inconspicuous when seen either from above or below.

— Frank Evers Beddard

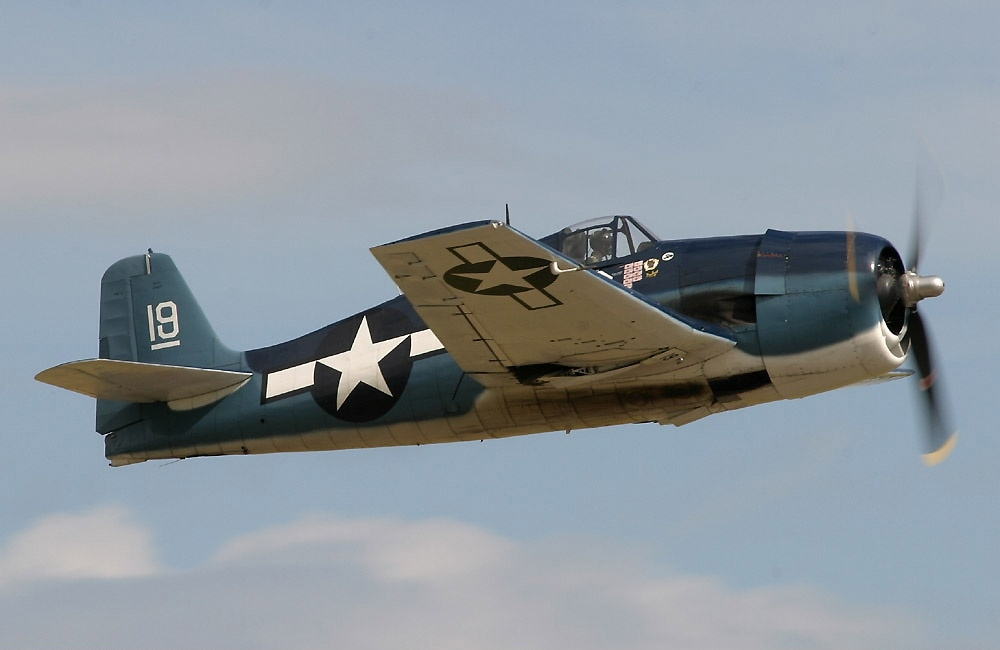
Top/bottom countershaded (Note: Colours used are Non-Specular Sea Blue, Intermediate Blue, White.) Grumman F6F Hellcat

Early researchers including Alfred Russel Wallace, Beddard, Cott and Craik argued that in marine animals including pelagic fish such as marlin and mackerel, as well as dolphins, sharks, and penguins the upper and lower surfaces are sharply distinct in tone, with a dark upper surface and often a nearly white lower surface. They suggested that when seen from the top, the darker dorsal surface of the animal would offer camouflage against the darkness of the deep water below. When seen from below, the lighter ventral area would similarly provide the least possible contrast with the sunlit ocean surface above. There is some evidence for this in birds, where birds that catch fish at a medium depth, rather than at the surface or on the seabed, are more often coloured in this way, and the prey of these birds would see only the underside of the bird. Rowland concluded that each possible role for coloration patterns lumped together as "countershading" needs to be evaluated separately, rather than just assuming it functions effectively.

=== Outline obliteration from above ===
Rowland (2009) identified an additional mechanism of countershading not previously analysed, namely that a round body such as a cylinder illuminated and seen from above appears to have dark sides. Using a graphics tool, she demonstrated that this effect can be flattened out by countershading. Since predators are known to use edges to identify prey, countershading may therefore, she argues, make prey harder to detect when seen from above.

=== Non-camouflage theories ===
Non-camouflage theories include protection from ultraviolet light; thermoregulation; and protection from abrasion. All three of these "plausible" theories remained largely untested in 2009, according to Rowland.

== Evidence ==
Despite demonstrations and examples adduced by Cott and others, little experimental evidence for the effectiveness of countershading was gathered in the century since Thayer's discovery. Experiments in 2009 using artificial prey showed that countershaded objects do have survival benefits and in 2012, a study by William Allen and colleagues showed that countershading in 114 species of ruminants closely matched predictions for "self-shadow concealment", the function predicted by Poulton, Thayer and Cott.

== Mechanism ==
Evolutionary developmental biology has assembled evidence from embryology and genetics to show how evolution has acted at all scales from the whole organism down to individual genes, proteins and genetic switches. In the case of countershaded mammals with dark (often brownish) upper parts and lighter (often buff or whitish) under parts, such as in the house mouse, it is the Agouti gene which creates the difference in shading. Agouti encodes for a protein, the Agouti signalling peptide (ASP), which specifically inhibits the action of the Melanocortin 1 receptor (MC1R). In the absence of the Agouti protein, alpha-melanocyte-stimulating hormone stimulates the cells bearing MC1R, melanocytes, to produce dark eumelanin, colouring the skin and fur dark brown or black. In the presence of the Agouti protein, the same system produces the lighter-coloured, yellow or red phaeomelanin. A genetic switch active in the cells of the embryo that will become the belly skin causes the Agouti gene to become active there, creating the countershading seen in adult mammals.

== Reverse countershading ==
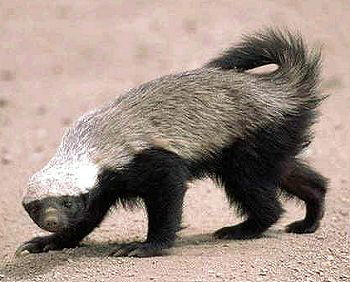
The honey badger is reverse countershaded, a form of aposematism (warning coloration).

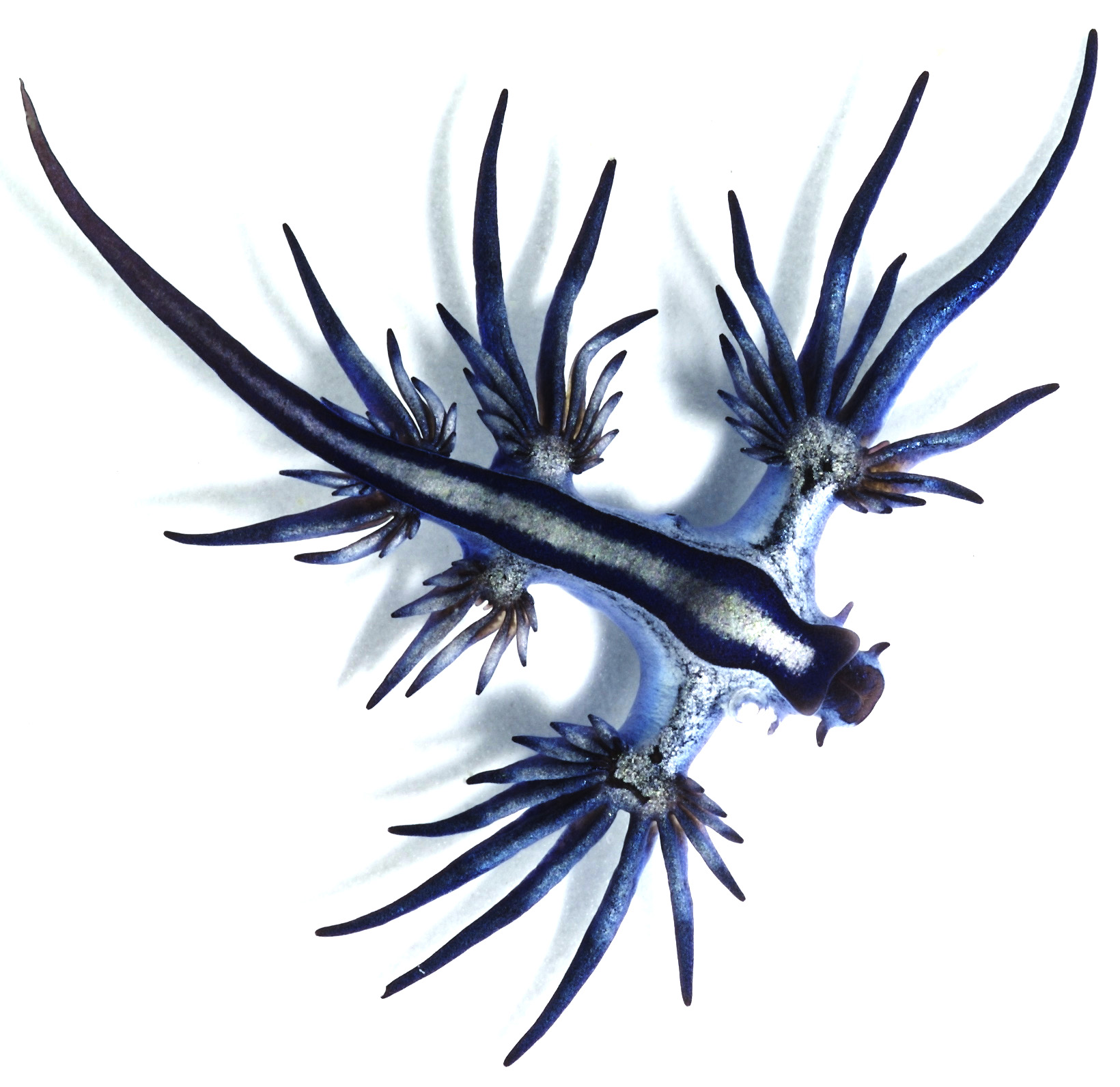
The sea slug Glaucus atlanticus swims and is countershaded upside-down.

If countershading paints out shadows, the reverse, darkening the belly and lightening the back, would maximise contrast by adding to the natural fall of light. This pattern of animal coloration is found in animals such as the skunk and honey badger with strong defences—the offensive stink of the skunk, and the sharp claws, aggressive nature and stink of the honey badger. These animals do not run when under attack, but move slowly, often turning to face the danger, and giving deimatic or threat displays either to startle inexperienced predators, or as an aposematic signal, to warn off experienced ones.

The caterpillar of the Luna moth, as discovered by Thayer, is in Cott's phrase "countershaded in relation to [its] attitude", i.e. shaded with a light back grading to a dark belly, as is the Nile catfish, Synodontis batensoda for the same reason: these animals (and other caterpillars including Automeris io and the eyed hawkmoth, Smerinthus ocellatus) habitually live 'upside down' with the belly uppermost. Similarly in the sea slug Glaucus atlanticus, the reverse countershading is associated with inverted habits. These animals are thus employing countershading in the usual way for camouflage.

== Examples in animals ==
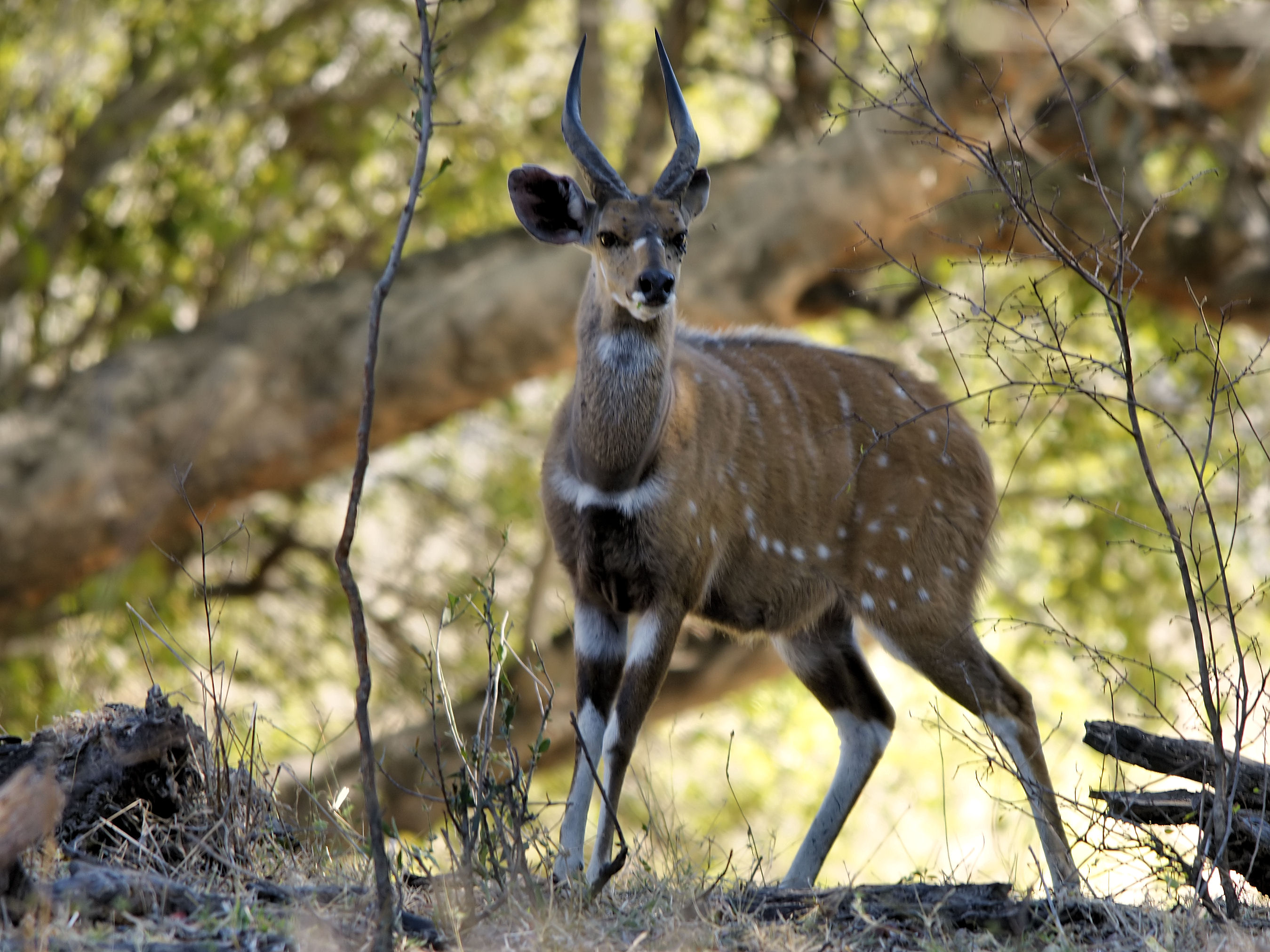
Bushbuck, Tragelaphus scriptus, appears almost perfectly even in tone, showing that its countershading has cancelled out its self-shading. The white spots and markings help to disrupt the 'solidity' of the animal further.

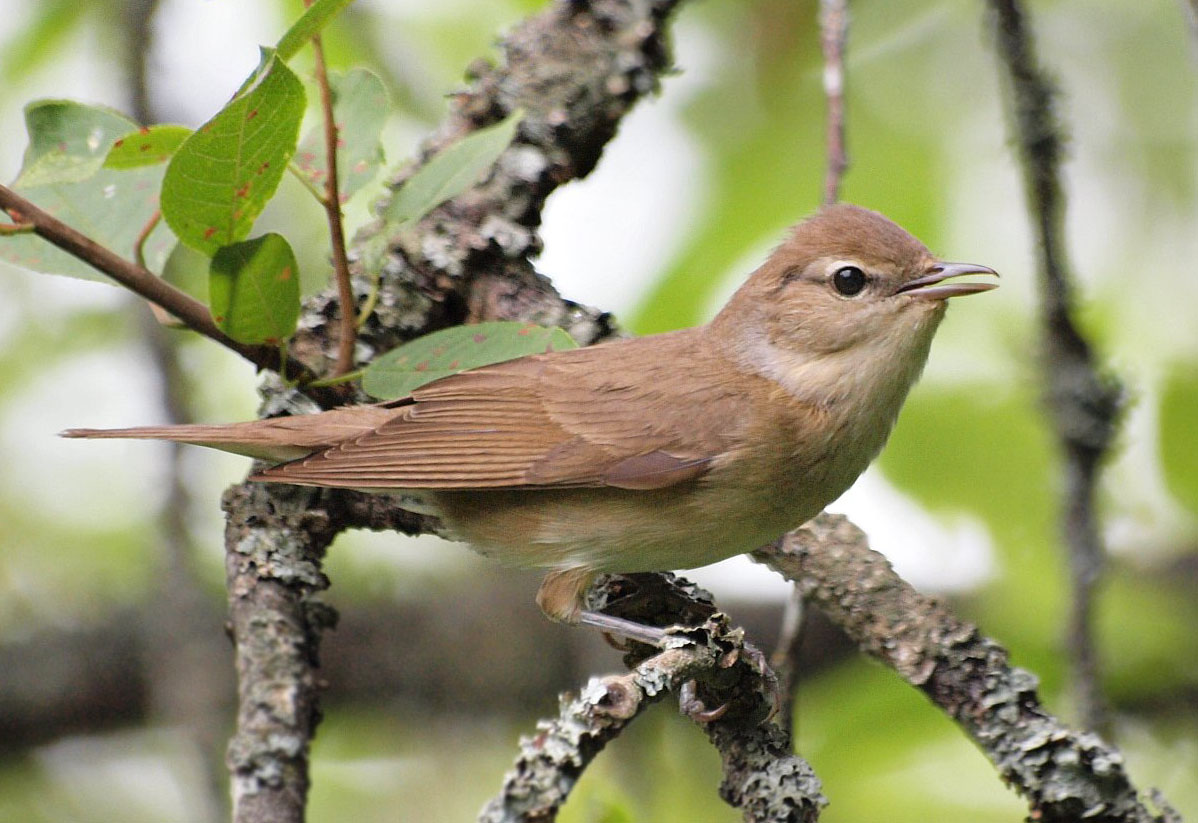
Many birds, such as this garden warbler, Sylvia borin, are countershaded. The lighter belly makes the bird appear almost evenly coloured when seen from the side.

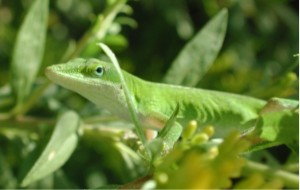
The Carolina anole lizard, Anolis carolinensis, is smoothly countershaded.

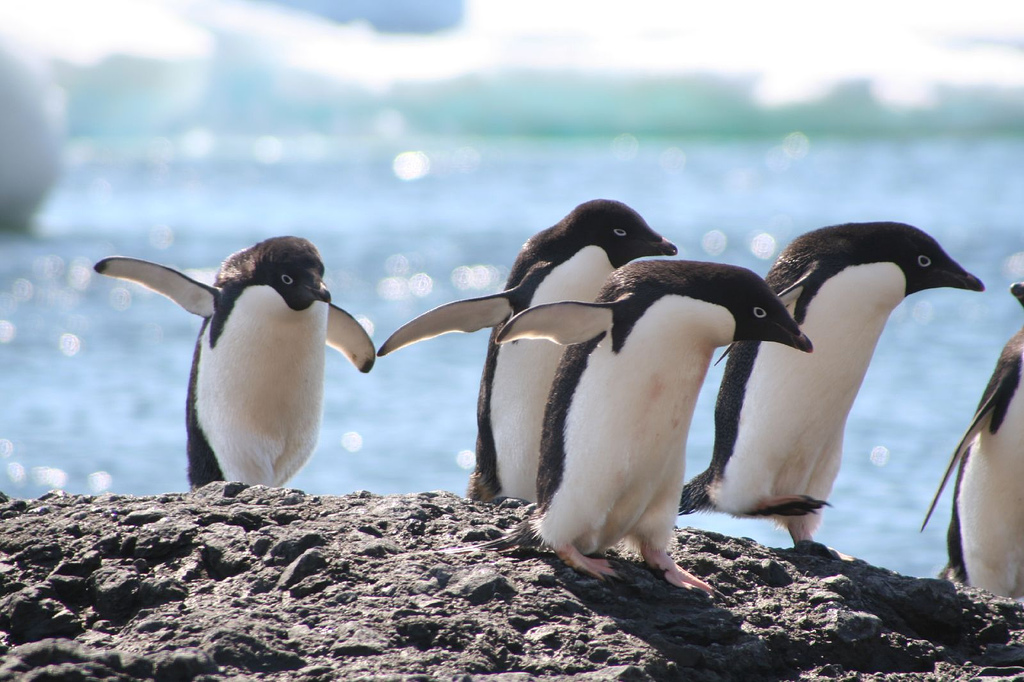
Adelie penguins, Pygoscelis adeliae, are white below and dark above, presumably to enable them to blend with the sea surface when seen from below, and with deep water when seen from above.

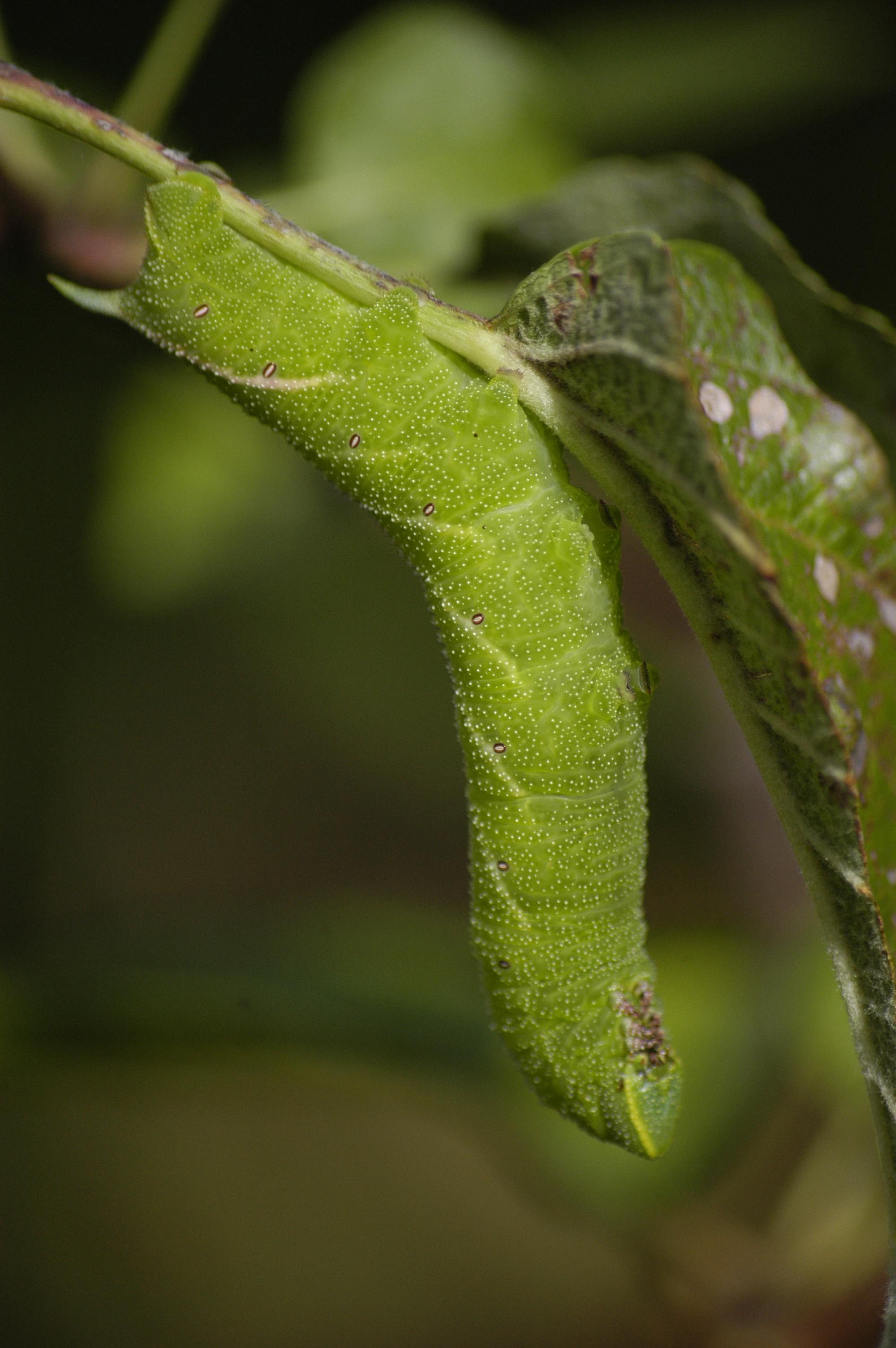
The caterpillar larva of the eyed hawkmoth, Smerinthus ocellatus, is reverse countershaded, making it appear flat when upside-down in feeding position.

When the eyed hawkmoth caterpillar is turned upright, as here, its countershading adds to the shading caused by sunlight, rather than "painting it out", so its body appears strongly rounded in this position.

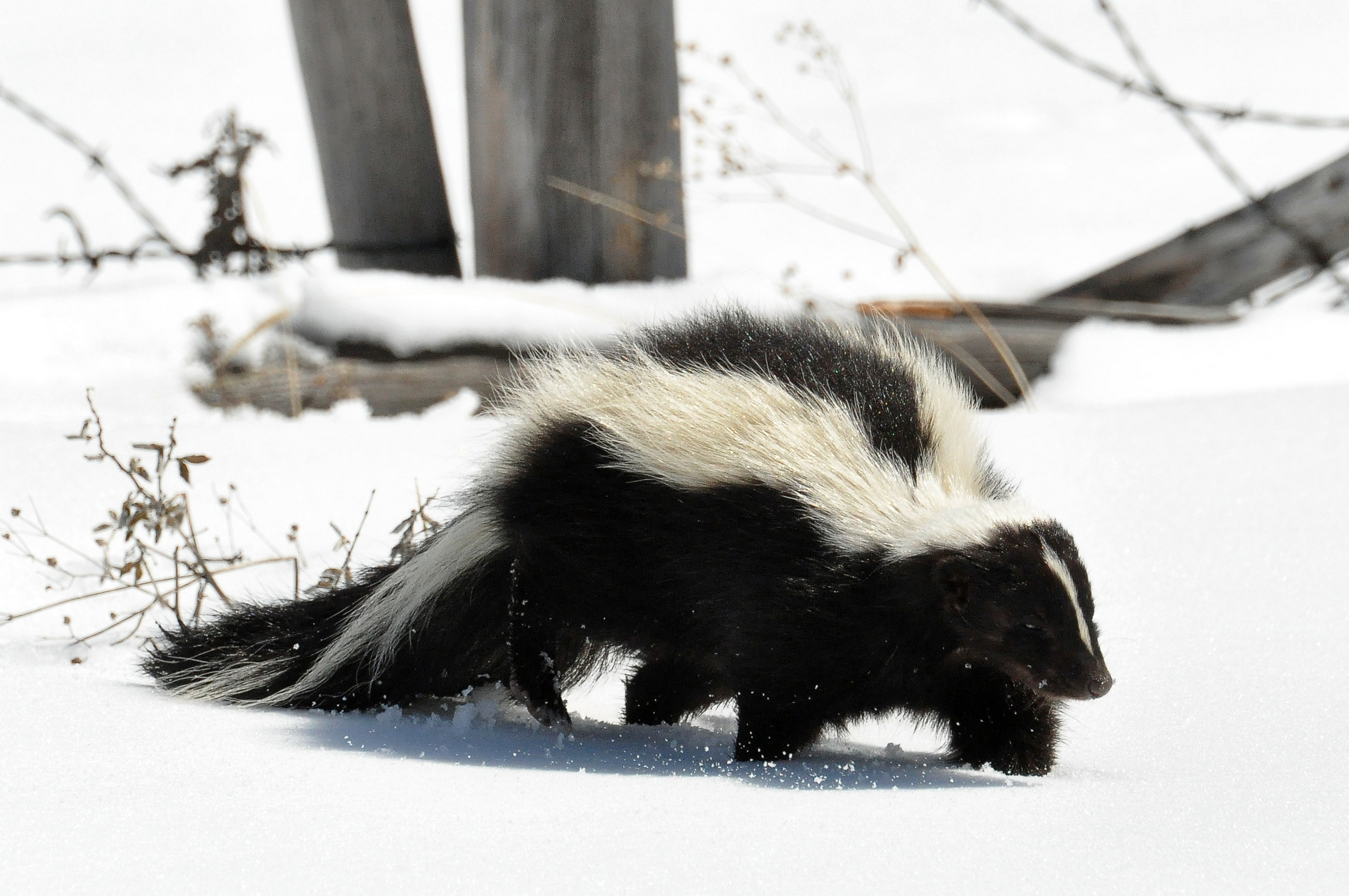
Striped skunk, Mephitis mephitis, has conspicuous warning coloration with reversed countershading, alerting predators to its powerfully defensive stink.

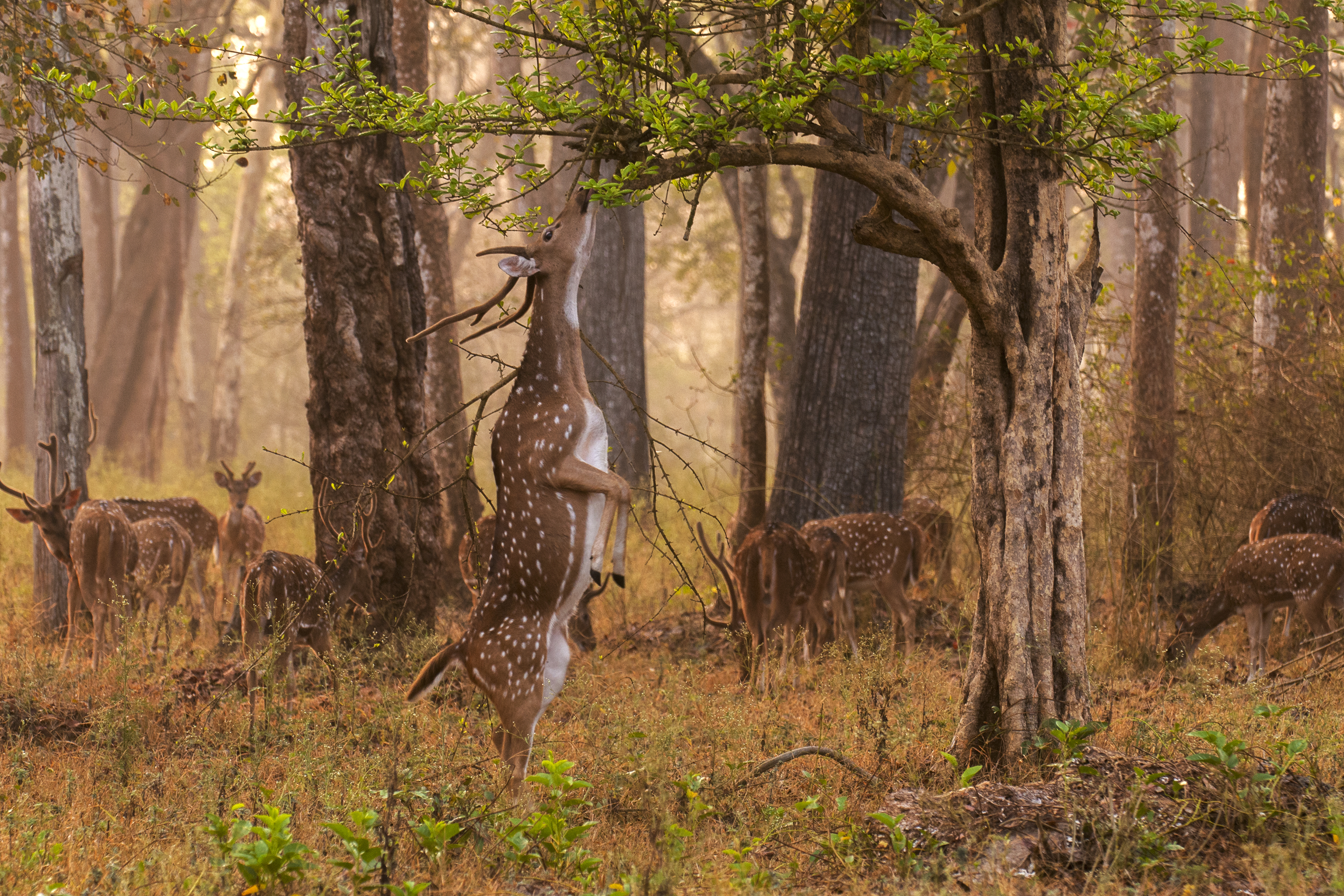
Chital deer, Axis axis. The animals in the background are effectively countershaded with their bodies horizontal, but the upright stag in the foreground is made conspicuous by its light belly. The spotting is disruptive.

== See also ==
- Synodontis nigriventris, an "upside-down" catfish (with reverse countershading)
- Counterchanging, a heraldic device of similar appearance

== Bibliography ==
=== Pioneering books ===
- Beddard, Frank Evers (1892). Animal coloration; an account of the principal facts and theories relating to the colours and markings of animals. Swan Sonnenschein.
- Cott, Hugh B. (1940). Adaptive Coloration in Animals. Oxford University Press.
- Thayer, Gerald H. (1909). Concealing-Coloration in the Animal Kingdom. An Exposition of the Laws of Disguise Through Color and Pattern: Being a Summary of Abbott H. Thayer's Discoveries. Macmillan.
- Wallace, Alfred Russel (1889). Darwinism. An exposition of the theory of natural selection with some of its applications. Macmillan.

=== General reading ===
- Behrens, Roy R. (2009). Goldstein, E Bruce (ed.). Encyclopedia of Perception, Volume 1. Sage. pp. 233–235.
- Edmunds, Malcolm (2008). "Deimatic Behavior". In Capinera, John L. (ed.). Encyclopedia of Entomology. Springer. ISBN 9781402062421.
- Forbes, Peter (2009). Dazzled and Deceived: Mimicry and Camouflage. Yale.
- Rowland, Hannah M. (2011). "The history, theory and evidence for a cryptic function of countershading". In Stevens, Martin; Merilaita, Sami (eds.). Animal Camouflage: Mechanisms and Function. Cambridge University Press.
- Ruxton, Graeme D.; Sherratt, Thomas N.; Speed, Michael P. (2004). "3. Countershading and counterillumination". Avoiding Attack: The Evolutionary Ecology of Crypsis, Warning Signals and Mimicry. Oxford University Press.

=== Journals ===
- Allen, William L.; Baddeley, Roland; Cuthill, Innes C.; Scott-Samuel, Nicholas E. (December 2012). "A Quantitative Test of the Predicted Relationship between Countershading and Lighting Environment" (PDF). The American Naturalist. 180 (6): 762–776. doi:10.1086/668011. JSTOR 10.1086/668011. PMID 23149401. S2CID 28206975.
- Anon (4 November 1943). "Principles of Camouflage". Tactical and Technical Trends. 37.
- Behrens, Roy (27 February 2009). "Revisiting Abbott Thayer: non-scientific reflections about camouflage in art, war and zoology". Philosophical Transactions of the Royal Society B. 364 (1516). Royal Society Publishing: 497–501. doi:10.1098/rstb.2008.0250. PMC 2674083. PMID 19000975.
- Craik, K.J. (1944). "White plumage of sea-birds". Nature. 153 (3879): 288. Bibcode:1944Natur.153..288C. doi:10.1038/153288a0. S2CID 4226797.
- Edmunds, M.; Dewhirst, R.A. (1994). "The survival value of countershading with wild birds as predators". Biological Journal of the Linnean Society. 51 (4): 447–452. doi:10.1111/j.1095-8312.1994.tb00973.x.
- Elias, Ann (2011). Camouflage Australia: Art, Nature, Science and War. Sydney University Press. pp. 47–53.
- Hershberger, W. (1970). "Attached-shadow orientation perceived as depth by chickens reared in an environment illuminated from below". J. Comp. Physiol. Psychol. 73 (3): 407–411. doi:10.1037/h0030223. PMID 5514675.
- Jones, B.W.; Nishiguchi, M.K. (2004). "Counterillumination in the Hawaiian bobtail squid, Euprymna scolopes Berry (Mollusca : Cephalopoda)" (PDF). Marine Biology. 144 (6): 1151–1155. Bibcode:2004MarBi.144.1151J. doi:10.1007/s00227-003-1285-3. S2CID 86576334.
- Kiltie, R.A. (1989). "Testing Thayer's countershading hypothesis - an image-processing approach". Animal Behaviour. 38 (3): 542–544. doi:10.1016/S0003-3472(89)80048-X. S2CID 53144080.
- Office of Naval Research (2013). "Ocean Life: Mammals – Adaptation". Office of Naval Research. Archived from the original on 24 October 2008.
- Poulton, Edward B. (October 1887). "Notes in 1886 upon Lepidopterous Larvae, etc". Transactions of the Entomological Society of London: 294.
- Poulton, Edward B. (October 1888). "Notes in 1887 upon Lepidopterous Larvae, etc". Transactions of the Entomological Society of London: 595–596.
- Rowland, Hannah M. (2009). "Abbott Thayer to the present day: what have we learned about the function of countershading?". Philosophical Transactions of the Royal Society B. 364 (1516): 519–527. doi:10.1098/rstb.2008.0261. JSTOR 40485817. PMC 2674085. PMID 19000972.
- Ruxton, Graeme D.; Speed, Michael P.; Kelly, David J. (2004). "What, if anything, is the adaptive function of countershading?" (PDF). Animal Behaviour. 68 (3): 445–451. doi:10.1016/j.anbehav.2003.12.009. S2CID 43106264.
- Speed, M.P.; Kelly, David J.; Davidson, A.M.; G.D. Ruxton (2005). "Countershading enhances crypsis with some bird species but not others". Behavioral Ecology. 16 (2): 327–334. doi:10.1093/beheco/arh166.
- Tankus, Ariel; Yeshurun, Yehezkel (2001). "Convexity-based Visual Camouflage Breaking". Computer Vision and Image Understanding. 82 (3): 208–237. doi:10.1006/cviu.2001.0912.
- Tooley, Kurt (15 December 2005). "Advanced camouflage system and method, Patent application 11/159,911, Publication US 2005/0276955 A1". US Patent Office. pp. 1–4.
- Young, R.E.; Roper, C.F.E. (1976). "Bioluminescent countershading in midwater animals: Evidence from living squid". Science. 191 (4231): 1046–1048. Bibcode:1976Sci...191.1046Y. doi:10.1126/science.1251214. PMID 1251214.
- Young, R.E.; Roper, C.F.E. (1977). "Intensity regulation of bioluminescence during countershading in living midwater animals". Fishery Bulletin. 75 (2): 239–252.
