= Thomas N. Sherratt =

Canadian ecologist

Thomas "Tom" N. Sherratt is a professor of evolutionary ecology at Carleton University, Canada. He is known for his research on camouflage, aposematism and mimicry.

== Life ==
Sherratt earned his bachelor's degree at the University of Edinburgh, and gained his Ph.D. at the University of Dundee. He states that the two main themes in his research laboratory are the evolution of surprising traits in behaviour and morphology, including co-operation with unrelated individuals (as opposed to kin selection) and the existence of conspicuous warning signals; and the way that individual behaviour shapes the spatio-temporal dynamics of populations, as when travelling waves are set up when individuals move over a landscape feature.

== Work ==
Sherratt has contributed to more than 100 papers in major journals. His co-written 2004 book Avoiding Attack on camouflage, aposematism and mimicry has been cited over 2,400 times, while his co-written papers "Development of cooperative relationships through increasing investment" and "Evidence of intra-specific competition for food in a pelagic seabird" have each been cited over 400 times.

== Books ==
- Ruxton, G.D., Allen W., Sherratt T.N. & Speed M.P. (2018). Avoiding Attack: the Evolutionary Ecology of Crypsis, Warning Signals and Mimicry. Second Edition Oxford University Press.
- Sherratt, T. N.; Wilkinson, D. M. (2009). Big Questions in Ecology and Evolution. Oxford University Press.
- Ruxton Graeme D., Sherratt, T. N.; Speed, M. P. (2004). Avoiding attack: the evolutionary ecology of crypsis, warning signals and mimicry. Oxford University Press.
