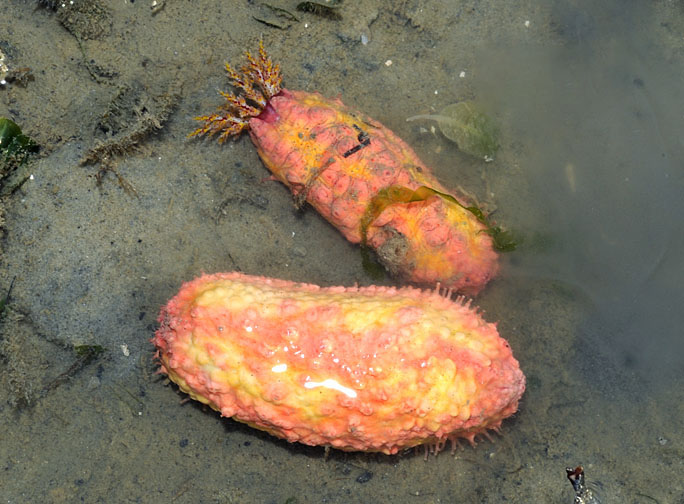

Scientific classification
- Kingdom: Animalia
- Phylum: Echinodermata
- Class: Holothuroidea
- Order: Dendrochirotida
- Family: Cucumariidae
- Genus: Cercodemas
- Species: C. anceps

Binomial name
- Cercodemas anceps Selenka, 1867

= Cercodemas anceps =

Species of sea cucumber

Cercodemas anceps, commonly known as the pink warty cucumber, is a species of sea cucumber found in the warm waters of the Indo-Pacific.

== Description ==
Cercodema anceps is a moderately sized sea cucumber, growing up to 11 cm (4.3 in) in length. They have a fairly short squarish body with distinct pink and yellow coloring. They have small rounded bumps on them, giving them their common name “Pink Warty Sea Cucumber.”

== Distribution and habitat ==
Cercodema anceps is native to the tropical Indo-Pacific region. They are found at depths of 5–65 m (16–213 ft). C. anceps is benthic. They are commonly found on wooden debris. In areas with good water flow, they may be very abundant.

== Ecology and behavior ==
Cercodema anceps are filter feeders, meaning they eat microorganisms from the water. Specifically, they use their tentacles to catch food and move it to their mouth.

Members of the Cucumariidae family reproduce in a variety of ways. Some are hermaphorditic and some brood their eggs. There is limited research on C. anceps specifically so their reproductive strategies are not well known. Interestingly, at least four species within the order Dendrochirotida are capable of asexual reproduction by breaking off sections of their body and regenerating those parts. It is possible that C. anceps are able to asexually reproduce in the same fashion.

== Conservation ==
Due to their colorful appearance, C. anceps is often targeted by Chinese recreational fisheries. It is unclear what effect this may have on their population numbers.

== Uses ==
Compounds naturally occurring in C. anceps have shown potential in killing certain types of cancers, though more research is needed.
