= Graeme Ruxton =

British zoologist

Graeme Douglas Ruxton FRSE is a zoologist known for his research into behavioural ecology and evolutionary ecology.

== Life and work ==
Ruxton received his PhD in Statistics and Modelling Science in 1992 from the University of Strathclyde. His studies focus on the evolutionary pressures on aggregation by animals, and predator-prey aspects of sensory ecology. He researched visual communication in animals at the University of Glasgow, where he was professor of theoretical ecology. In 2013 he became professor at the University of St Andrews, Scotland.

== Publications ==
Ruxton has published numerous papers on antipredator adaptations, along with contributions to textbooks. His book Living in Groups has been cited over 2300 times. His textbook Avoiding Attack. The Evolutionary Ecology of Crypsis, Warning Signals and Mimicry has been cited over 1150 times. His paper "Collective memory and spatial sorting in animal groups" has been cited over 1300 times, while his paper on the use of statistics in behavioural ecology, "The unequal variance t-test is an underused alternative to Student's t-test and the Mann–Whitney U test", has been cited over 850 times.

== Honours and awards ==
In 2012 Ruxton was elected a Fellow of the Royal Society of Edinburgh.
