= Distractive markings =

Type of camouflage markings

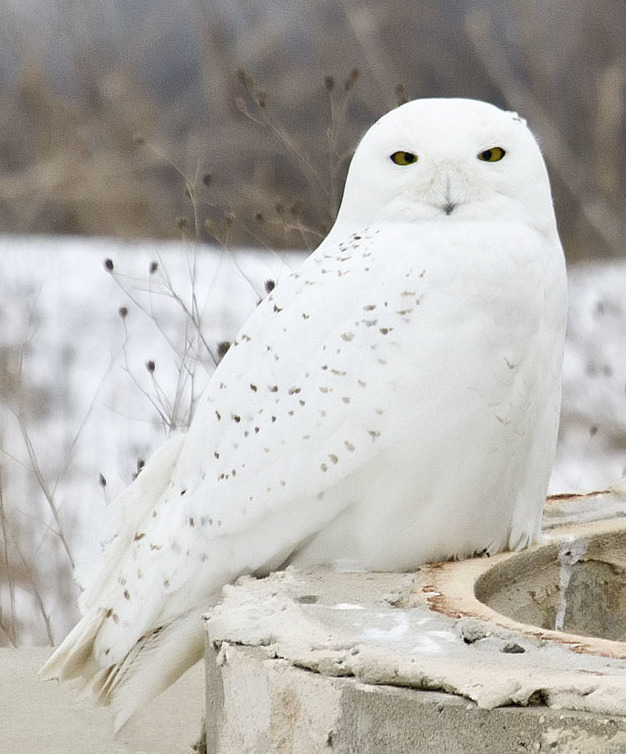
In 1909, Abbott Handerson Thayer described the snowy owl's black markings on its white snow camouflage as distractive.

Distractive markings serve to camouflage animals or military vehicles by drawing the observer's attention away from the object as a whole, such as noticing its outline. This delays recognition. The markings necessarily have high contrast and are thus in themselves conspicuous. The mechanism therefore relies, as does camouflage as a whole, on deceiving the cognition of the observer, not in blending with the background.

Distractive markings were first noticed by the American artist Abbott Handerson Thayer in 1909, but the mechanism was for a century confused with disruptive coloration, another mechanism for delaying recognition that also relies on conspicuous markings. Distractive markings however need to be small and to avoid outlines, to avoid drawing attention to them, whereas disruptive markings work best when they touch the outline, breaking it up.

Distractive camouflage marks are sometimes called dazzle markings, but the mechanism differs from motion dazzle.

== History ==
The American artist Abbott Handerson Thayer described distractive markings in his 1909 book on camouflage, Concealing-Coloration in the Animal Kingdom. Thayer wrote that

several snow-land animals ... [such as] Arctic hares and foxes, the boreal weasels and ... the ptarmigans, the snow buntings, the snowy owl ... have a few sharp black markings in their mainly immaculate white costumes. These evidently serve as what may be called 'distractive' or 'fixed dazzling' marks. They are, in most cases, too small to show except in a very near view—when, by their sharp but isolated and noncommittal conspicuousness, they tend to draw and hold the eye's attention, in a sense, to dazzle it, so that it less readily discerns the faintly shown snow-white body of their wearer.

== Mechanism ==
Disruptive and distractive camouflage both rely on conspicuous markings, but differ in their mechanisms, and therefore in the most effective size and position of the markings.

For camouflage to succeed, an individual has to pass undetected, unrecognized or untargeted, and hence it is the processing of visual information that needs to be deceived. Camouflage is therefore an adaptation to the perception and cognitive mechanisms of another animal.

— S. Merilaita, N. E. Scott-Samuel, I. C. Cuthill

Many prey animals have conspicuous high-contrast markings which paradoxically attract the predator's gaze, like other camouflage mechanisms, especially masquerade, working by exploiting weaknesses in the predator's cognitive mechanisms to delay detection or recognition of the prey. These distractive markings serve as camouflage by distracting the predator's attention from recognising the prey as a whole, for example by keeping the predator from identifying the prey's outline. Experimentally, search times for blue tits increased when artificial prey had distractive markings. The researchers, M. Dimitrova and colleagues, note that Thayer's suggestion that such marks take up the predator's attention is plausible, since visual attention is limited, and stimuli effectively compete for attention. They note, too, that bright features are preferentially given attention in human vision, so it is possible the same happens in other species. Another possible explanation according to Dimitrova is lateral masking, suppression of peripheral perception; this is known to be strong, again in human perception, when a (single) high-contrast stimulus is provided, but it is doubtful whether a pattern containing small distractive markings could form such a stimulus.

There is an apparent conflict between background matching and disruptive markings. Background matching relies on choosing coloration and brightness similar to the background, but disruptive markings must stand out from the background. Dimitrova and colleagues note that Thayer suggested that such markings must be small; this, they argue, would enable the markings to fit in with background matching at any great distance, and would prevent predators from learning a search image and then detecting prey with that type of marking.

Hugh Cott, author of the 1940 Adaptive Coloration in Animals, followed by many other researchers, conflated distractive markings with disruptive coloration. Both mechanisms require conspicuous marks. However, the two mechanisms are different, and according to Dimitrova require different kinds of marking. For distraction, the markings should be small and should avoid the prey's outline so as to take attention away from it, whereas disruptive markings should contact the outline so as to break it up.

Distractive camouflage marks are sometimes called dazzle markings, but the mechanism differs from motion dazzle, which relies on conspicuous markings to interfere with an observer's ability to estimate the target's speed and direction.
