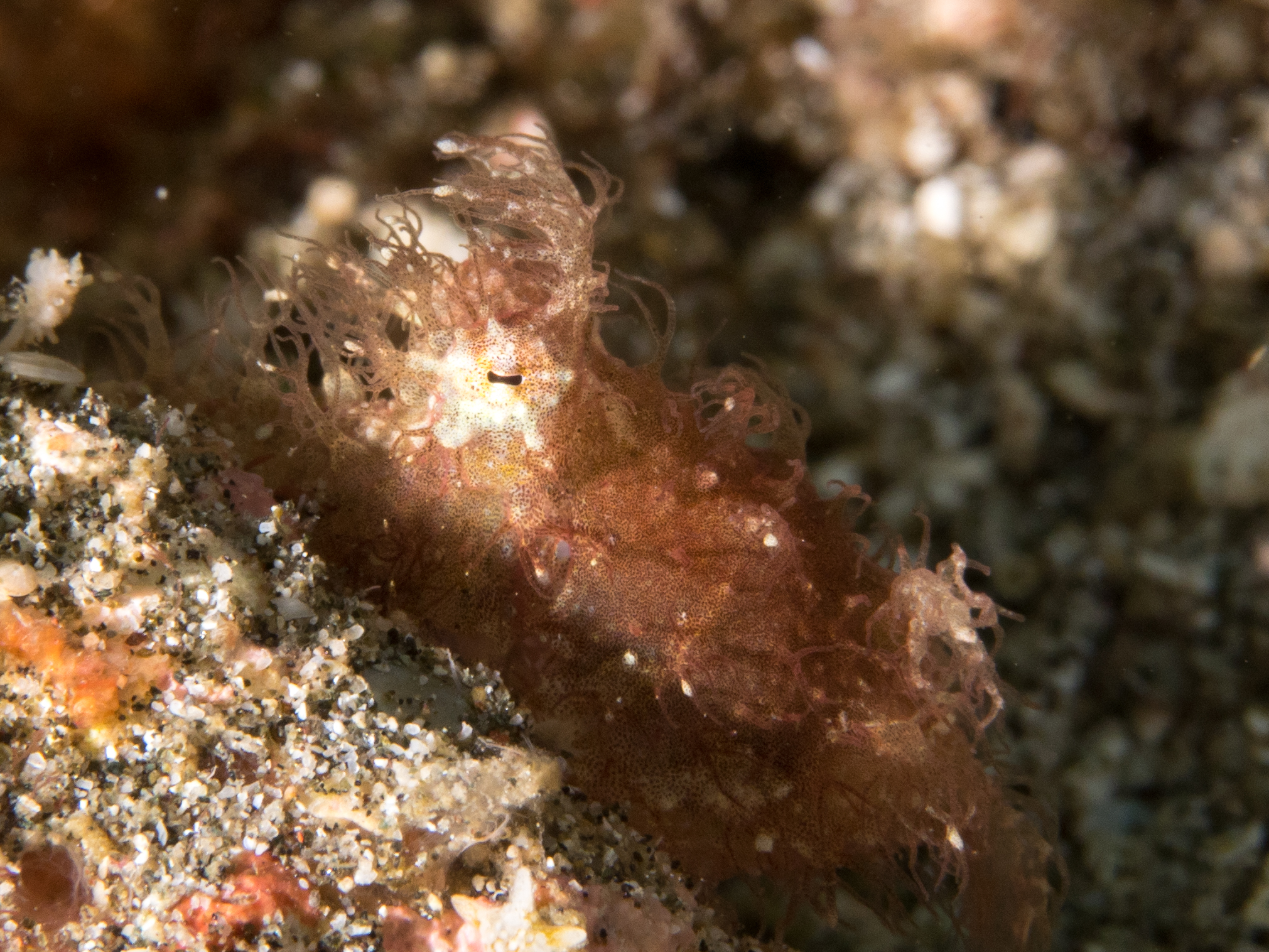

Scientific classification
- Kingdom: Animalia
- Phylum: Mollusca
- Class: Cephalopoda
- Order: Octopoda
- Family: Octopodidae
- Subfamily: Octopodinae
- Genus: Octopus
- Species: O. sp. 16

Binomial name
- Octopus sp. 16 Norman, 2000

= Hairy octopus =

Undescribed species of octopus

The hairy octopus (Octopus sp. 16) is an undescribed octopus species found in parts of the Indo-Pacific Ocean, such as north Sulawesi Island, the Lembeh Strait, Bali, Indonesia and Japan. They are identified by the heavily textured skin giving it a "hairy" appearance. Little is known about this species and a binomial name has not been provided.

== Description ==
The hairy octopus has a total length of 2 inches (5 cm) and a weight of 5 grams.

With the use of chromatophores, colour changing skin cells, the octopus can range from white, cream, brown and red, with or without patterns such as spots.

This octopus is usually heavily textured with the use of papillae, skin structures that expand and contract into various sizes to form texture. The hairy octopus has very fine hair-like papillae compared to other octopus such as the algae octopus (Abdopus aculeatus), a species with large, spiky papillae. According to marine biologist Mark Norman, the papillae allow them to mimic the appearance of seaweed in their environment.

== Distribution and habitat ==
The hairy octopus is found in shallow coral reefs and seagrass beds with sediments such as shell fragments and pebbles at a depth of 2 to 20 m (6 ft 7 in to 65 ft 7 in) in parts of the Indo-Pacific. It is active during the day.

== Ecology and behaviour ==
It is seen to frequently change the colour of their skin around their eyes which is often almost white. While the reason is unknown, it could be to stun prey, intimidate predators or act as a disruptive eye mask.

While the octopus can use its siphon to propel itself quickly through the water, it waits for the current to flow in its desired direction before riding it to the next location. This maintains its camouflage and conserves energy.
