= Martin Stevens (biologist) =

British biologist and marine photographer

- Born: 1982 (age 42–43)
- Education: Bristol University (BSc, PhD)
- Known for: Horse vision and obstacle visibility in horseracing
- Awards: Zoological Society of London's Scientific Medal (2019)
- Scientific career
- Fields: Sensory ecology; Evolutionary ecology; Marine biology; Animal camouflage; Mimicry; Signalling
- Institutions: University of Exeter; University of Cambridge

Martin Stevens is a British sensory and evolutionary ecologist, an underwater photographer and a natural history and popular science writer. He is known for his work on disruptive coloration in animal camouflage.

== Career and research ==
Stevens took his Ph.D. at the University of Bristol, in 2006. He then worked as a research fellow at the University of Cambridge, before moving to the University of Exeter, where his is a full Professor in its Centre for Ecology and Conservation.

His research lies within the scope of sensory ecology, covering sensory systems, especially vision, and the evolutionary adaptations dealing with colour changing abilities. Much of his work has been oriented to understand how colouration is used in nature, both defensively and opportunistically, in camouflage, mimicry and signalling.

In 2017, Stevens and Dr Sarah Paul led a study commissioned by British Horseracing Authority in collaboration with the Royal Society for the Prevention of Cruelty to Animals. It resulted in the decision to change the colour in all Great Britain's jump course obstacles from orange to white. By the use of cutting edge camera equipment, the researchers successfully showed how the orange is perceived by horses as shades of green. This could be confusing, since the orange, used in the racecourse obstacles, could be blending with grass. The study hence concluded that the original orange should be substituted by either white, fluorescent yellow or light blue in order to improve animal welfare and safety.

Stevens has published hundreds of journal papers, including Animal camouflage: current issues and new perspectives,, Using digital photography to study animal coloration, Disruptive coloration and background pattern matching. In total, his articles have thousands of citations.

== Marine photography ==
Stevens is an underwater photographer. With part of his academic research being on coloration in animals, image analysis and camera technology had always been part of his work. But, since they were used for data collection purposes, they were more like "ID-style shots", as he puts it. As his studies on colours increasingly moved towards marine animals, Stevens, who had a longstanding hobby of wildlife photography, started to work with and develop the underwater techniques. Thus, he began to give more attention to the underwater lighting and scenery where he frames his objects, to create better image compositions, "I’ve really worked on making my photographs aesthetically pleasing", he has mentioned. He showcases his photo portfolios on the Sensory Ecology Instagram account and Wildlife Vision website.

In 2022, Stevens' Rock pool star, an over-under style shot of a spiny starfish in shallow waters, was the winner of the Underwater Photography of the Year competition, in the UK waters compact camera category. His work has also been featured in a range of publications, including BBC Wildlife, BBC's Countryfile, Blue Marine Foundation, Marine Conservation Society and Cornwall Wildlife Trust.

He has commented that while he enjoys scuba diving, he takes most of his images while freediving or exploring tide pools and shallow inshore waters. He has also noted that his frequent photographing spots are the beaches like Gyllyngvase, around Falmouth, Cornwall, where he is based, with the further West locations of Helford estuary and Kynance Cove being among his preferred ones. A remarkable occasion that he recalls was snorkeling with blue sharks fifteen miles off the coast of Penzance.

As usual in the area, he started with the more accessible GoPro. While progressing to more sophisticated compact cameras, he still used the action camera for wide-angle photo and he has written a tutorial for underwater photography with a GoPro. He eventually migrated to the more professional Olympus OM-D E-M5 Mark III.

== Popular science writing ==
Besides the academic textbooks, Stevens has also written for a broader audience and has three books on popular science.

In Cheats and Deceits: How Animals and Plants Exploit and Mislead (2011), Stevens discusses how animals and plants use mimicry, deception, and trickery for protection, reproduction, and survival. With an experimental approach on the subject, he vindicates the works of the late-19th- and early-20th-century naturalists Abbott Thayer, Edward Poulton and Hugh Cott.

The 2021 release Life in Colour: How Animals See the World was published to accompany Sir David Attenborough's TV series Life in Colour and describes how vision is very particular for each kind of animal. The red-eyed tree frog from Costa Rica, for instance, has a peculiar ability. As Stevens describes, the frog has transparent eyelids, which allows it to look out for predators even when sleeping.

In the same year, Stevens also released Secret Worlds: The Extraordinary Senses of Animals, an easy-reading version of his 2013 textbook, Sensory Ecology, Behaviour, and Evolution. Stevens investigates the high energy costs of having well-developed senses. An interesting fact described concerns the nocturnal ogre-faced spider, from Australia, which has such large and sensitive eyes that it must break down its photoreceptors and membranes during the day and then regenerate them to hunt at night.

== Academic awards and honors ==
- 2019 – Zoological Society of London's Scientific Medal
- 2009 – Biotechnology and Biological Sciences Research Council David Philips fellowship
- 2009 – Churchill College, Cambridge Title A (Official) fellowship
- 2006 – Girton College, Cambridge research fellowship

== List of works ==
- Life in Colour: How Animals See the World (2021)
- Secret Worlds: The extraordinary senses of animals (2021)
- Cheats and Deceits: How Animals and Plants Exploit and Mislead (2016)
- Sensory Ecology, Behaviour, and Evolution (2013)
- Animal Camouflage: Mechanisms and Function (2011)
