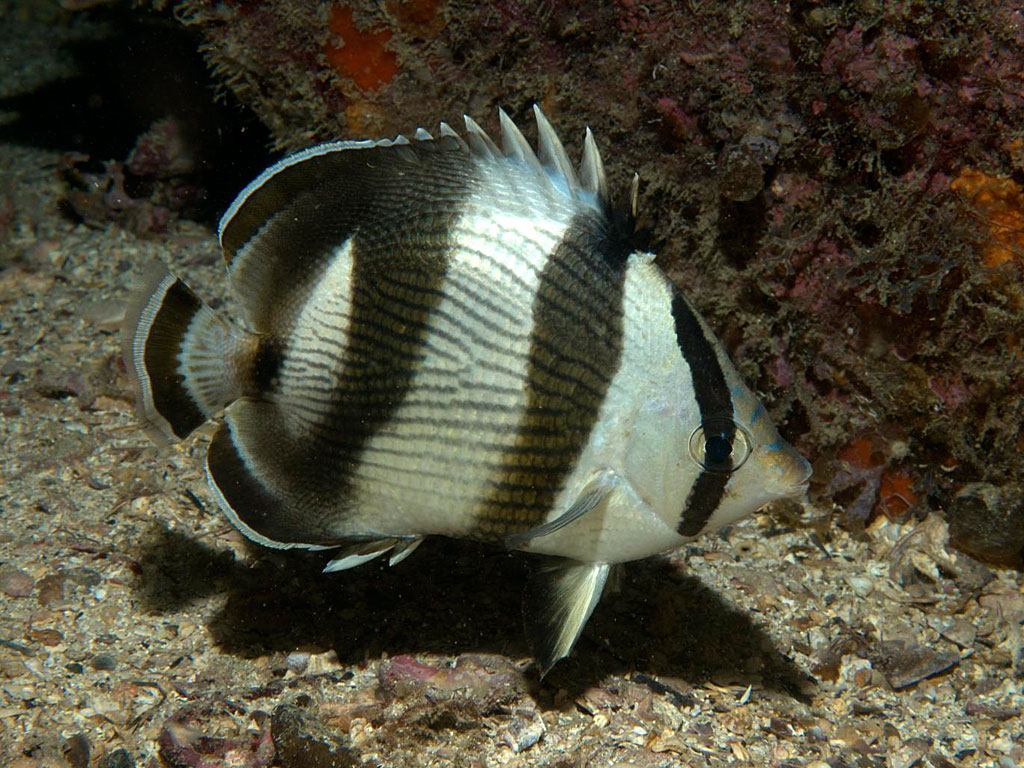

Conservation status
- Least Concern (IUCN 3.1)

Scientific classification
- Kingdom: Animalia
- Phylum: Chordata
- Class: Actinopterygii
- Division: Teleostei
- Order: Acanthuriformes
- Family: Chaetodontidae
- Genus: Chaetodon
- Subgenus: Chaetodon (Chaetodon)
- Species: C. striatus

Binomial name
- Chaetodon striatus Linnaeus, 1758

Synonyms
- Anisochaetodon trivirgatusWeber & de Beaufort, 1936; Chaetodon consuelae Mowbray, 1928; Chaetodon striatus albipinnis Ahl, 1923; Chaetodon striatus dorsimacula Ahl, 1923

= Banded butterflyfish =

Species of fish

The banded butterflyfish (Chaetodon striatus) is a species of marine ray-finned fish, a butterflyfish found in the tropical western Atlantic Ocean from Brazil to Bermuda. Common names include the banded butterflyfish, the butterbun, the butterflyfish, the Portuguese butterfly, the school mistress and the banded mariposa.

The name is derived from the dark vertical bands on the fish's body. This, combined with a vertical, black bar through the eye, is an antipredator adaptation, the bands disrupting the body's outlines.

== Description ==
The banded butterflyfish grows to a maximum length of about 16 cm (6.3 in). The dorsal fin has 12 spines and 19 to 21 soft rays. The anal fin has 3 spines and 16 to 17 soft rays. The colour of this fish is silvery with a slender black bar passing through its eye, two wide black bars in mid-body and a third wide bar that starts on the rear of the dorsal fin and continues to the caudal peduncle. The pelvic fins and the caudal fin are black.

== Distribution and habitat ==
This fish is native to the tropical and subtropical western Atlantic Ocean at depths down to about 55 metres (180 ft) but mostly in less than 20 metres (66 ft). Its range extends from Massachusetts in the United States to Santa Catarina in Brazil, and includes the Caribbean Sea, the Gulf of Mexico, Bermuda and Saint Peter and Saint Paul Archipelago. It is a benthic fish and is found on coral reefs.

== Behaviour ==
The banded butterflyfish is usually seen singly or in pairs, but can occur in small shoals of about twenty individuals. The diet is mainly small invertebrates, crustaceans, coral polyps, polychaete worms, tube worms, sea anemones and various eggs. It also feeds on plankton in the water column, in schools of up to 20 individuals. Sometimes it will act as a cleaning fish and remove the external parasites from surgeon fishes, grunts and parrot fishes.

== Status ==
C. striatus is a common species with a wide range. Although it is sometimes harvested for the reef aquarium trade, this is not thought to significantly impact the population which is believed to be stable. For these reasons, the International Union for Conservation of Nature has rated the fish's conservation status as being of "least concern".
