= Coincident disruptive coloration =

Camouflage joining up separate parts of body

Hugh Cott's drawings of 'coincident disruptive coloration' in the frog then called Megalixalus fornasinii formed "persuasive arguments" for natural selection. Left: active; right: at rest, marks coinciding.

Coincident disruptive coloration or coincident disruptive patterns are patterns of disruptive coloration in animals that go beyond the usual camouflage function of breaking up the continuity of an animal's shape, to join up parts of the body that are separate. This is seen in extreme form in frogs such as Afrixalus fornasini where the camouflage pattern extends across the body, head, and all four limbs, making the animal look quite unlike a frog when at rest with the limbs tucked in.

A special case is the disruptive eye mask that camouflages the most conspicuous feature of many animals, the eye.

== Camouflage mechanism ==
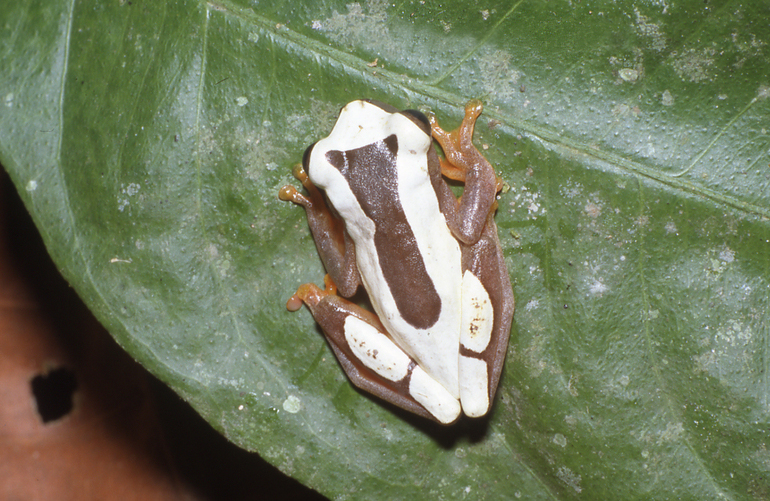
Cott noted the mechanism when he saw Dendropsophus leucophyllatus, the clown treefrog, and saw its similarity with the distantly related Megalixalus.

=== Historical description ===
The English zoologist and camouflage expert Hugh B. Cott explained, while discussing "a little frog known as Megalixalus fornasinii" in the chapter on coincident disruptive coloration in his 1940 book Adaptive Coloration in Animals, that

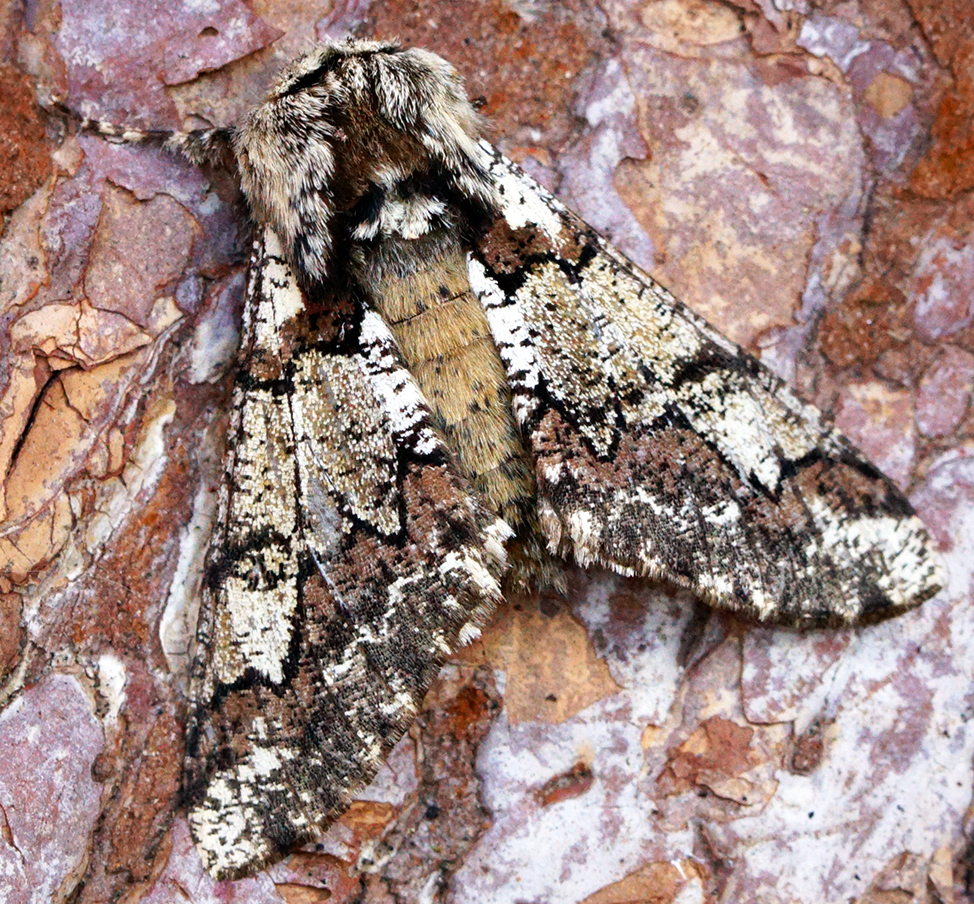
Forewing pattern of many moths such as Biston strataria, the oak beauty moth, coincides with pattern on the narrow margin of hindwing visible at rest.

It is only when the pattern is considered in relation to the frog's normal attitude of rest that its remarkable nature becomes apparent... The attitude and very striking colour-scheme thus combine to produce an extraordinary effect, whose deceptive appearance depends upon the breaking up of the entire form into two strongly contrasted areas of brown and white. Considered separately, neither part resembles part of a frog. Together in nature the white configuration alone is conspicuous. This stands out and distracts the observer's attention from the true form and contour of the body and appendages on which it is superimposed.

Cott concluded that the effect was concealment "so long as the false configuration is recognized in preference to the real one".

=== Taxonomic range ===
Coincident disruptive coloration is seen in other amphibians including the common frog, Rana temporaria, in which the dark and light bands that cross the body and hind legs coincide in the resting position, joining separate anatomical structures visually and breaking up and taking attention away from the body's actual outlines.

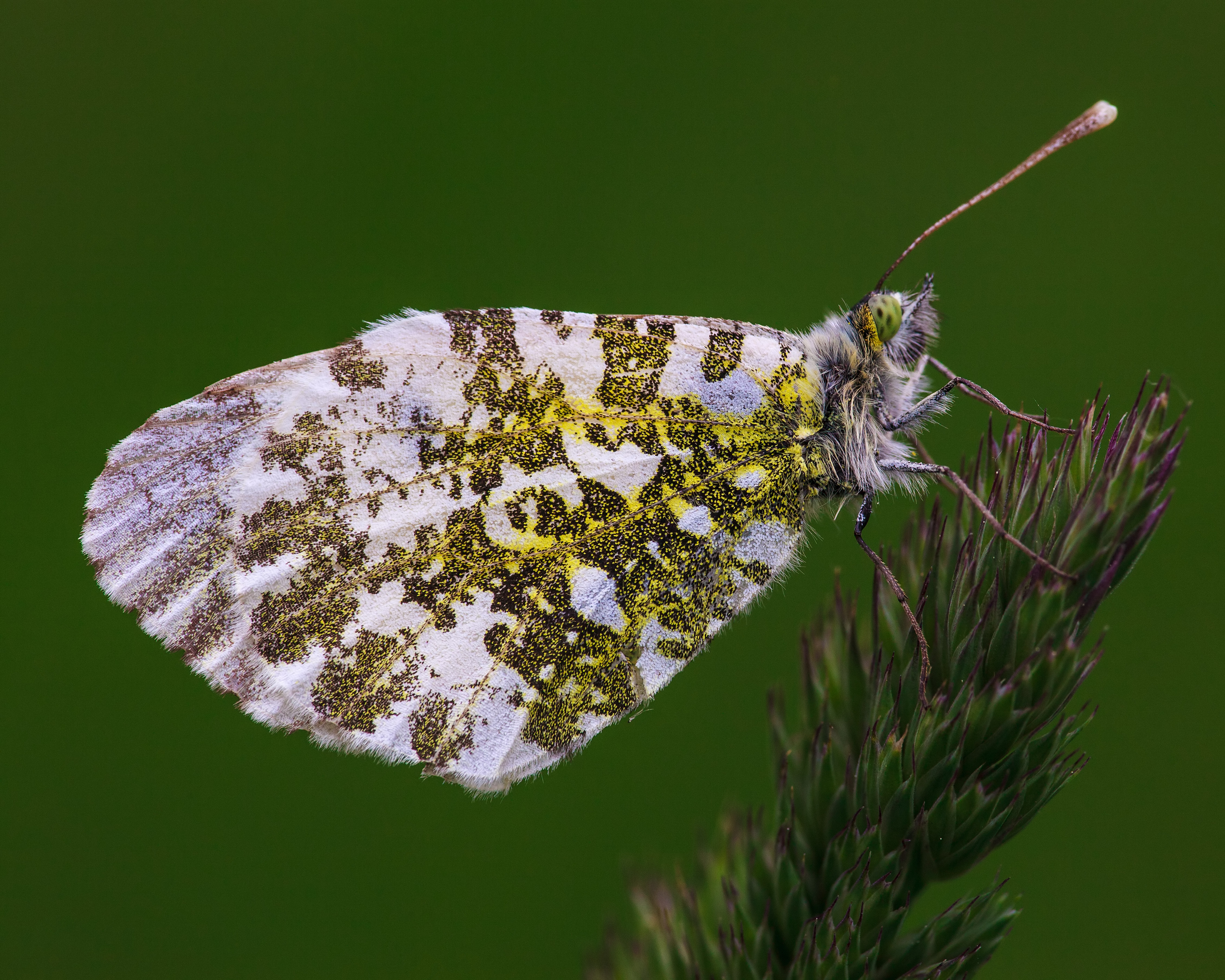
Disruptive patterns on underside of orange-tip butterfly Anthocharis cardamines coincide across fore- and hind-wings.

Several moths and butterflies make use of the mechanism; these include the oak beauty moth Biston strataria and the scalloped oak moth Crocallis elinguaria, in which the pattern on the forewing coincides with the pattern on the narrow strip of the hindwing which is visible in the moth's habitual resting position. Many moths and butterflies which often rest with the wings closed, such as the orange-tip Anthocharis cardamines, do the same but on the cryptically coloured underside of the wings.

=== Disruptive eye mask ===
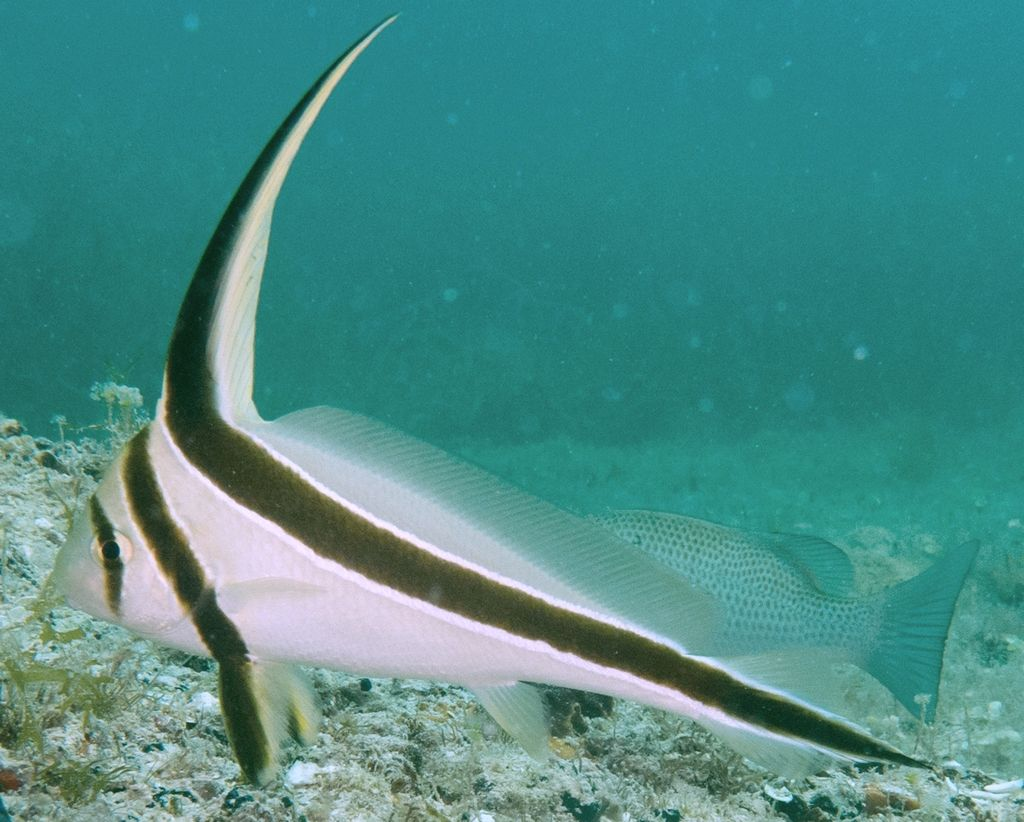
The jack-knifefish, Equetus lanceolatus, has a strongly disruptive pattern on body and through the eye, forming a disruptive eye mask.

One form of coincident disruptive coloration has special importance. Disruptive eye masks camouflage the eyes of a variety of animals, both invertebrates such as grasshoppers and vertebrates such as fishes, frogs, birds and snakes; some mammals have similar patterns. The eye has a distinctive shape and dark coloration dictated by its function, and it is housed in the vulnerable head, making it a natural target for predators. It can be camouflaged by a suitable disruptive pattern arranged to run up to or through the eye, in other words to coincide with it, such as the camouflage eyestripe of the Mexican vine snake and certain fishes.

== Experimental test ==
The effect was tested in two experiments in 2009 by Innes Cuthill and Aron Székely. The first experiment presented wild insect-eating birds with edible pastry targets resembling moths, with or without coincident disruptive patterns. The second experiment showed similar targets to humans on computer screens. They found in both experiments that coincident disruption was "an effective mechanism for concealing an otherwise revealing body form".

== Evidence for natural selection ==
In the words of the camouflage researchers Innes Cuthill and A. Székely, Cott's book provided "persuasive arguments for the survival value of coloration, and for adaptation in general, at a time when natural selection was far from universally accepted within evolutionary biology." In particular, they argued, Cott's category of "Coincident Disruptive Coloration" "made Cott's drawings the most compelling evidence for natural selection enhancing survival through disruptive camouflage."

Such patterns, Cott stressed, embody considerable precision. The markings must line up accurately between the folded limbs and body for the disguise to work. Cott's description and in particular his drawings convinced biologists that the markings must have survival value, rather than occurring by chance. Further, as Cuthill and Székely indicate, the bodies of animals that have such patterns must therefore have been shaped by natural selection.
