= Disruptive coloration =

Camouflage to break up an object's outlines

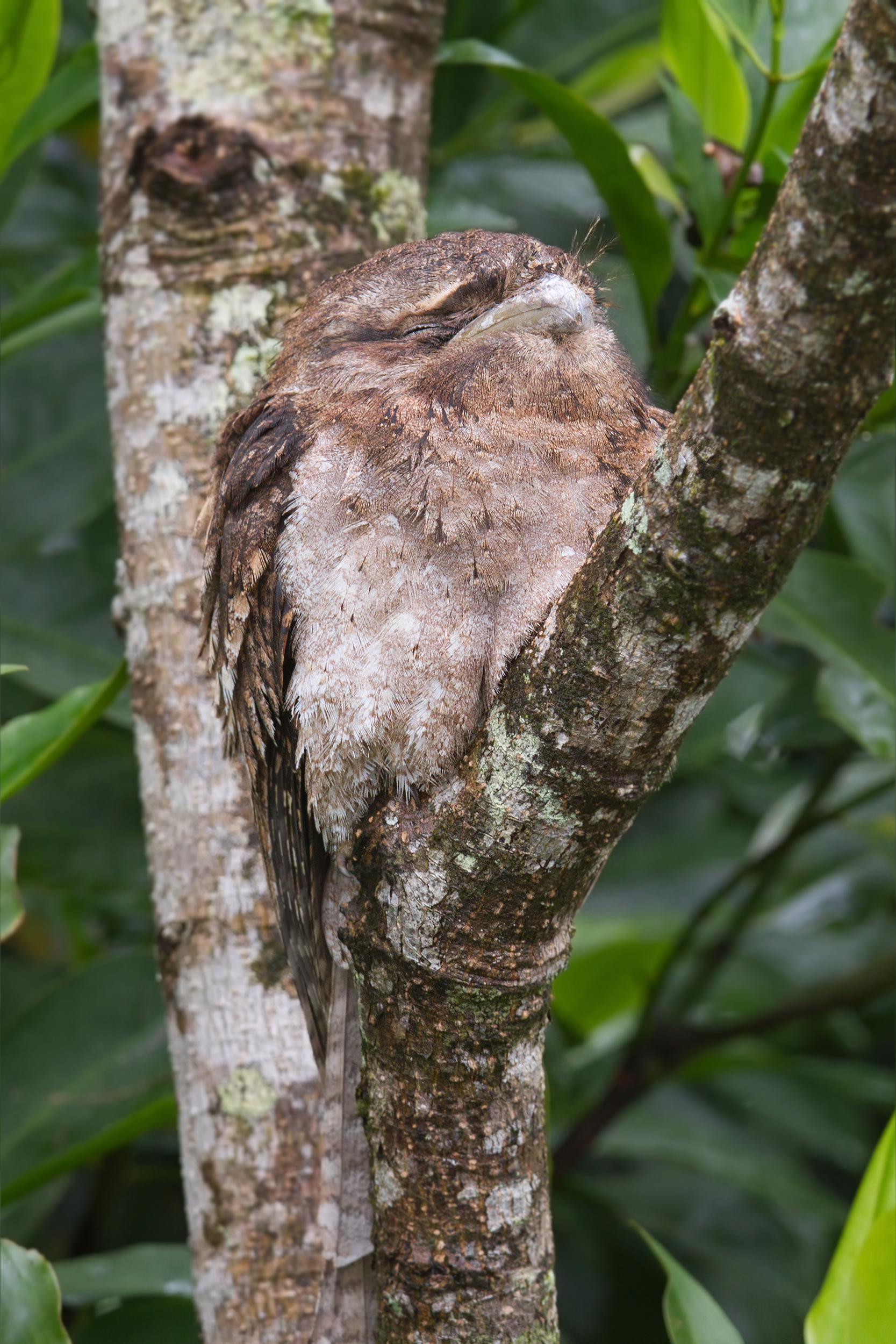
The coloration of the Papuan frogmouth Podargus papuensis, its outline disrupted by its plumage, its eye concealed in a stripe, is an effective anti-predator adaptation.

Disruptive coloration (also known as disruptive camouflage or disruptive patterning) is a form of camouflage that works by breaking up the outlines of an animal, soldier or military hardware with a strongly contrasting pattern. It is often combined with other methods of crypsis, including background colour matching and countershading; special cases are coincident disruptive coloration and the disruptive eye mask seen in some fishes, amphibians, and reptiles. It appears paradoxical as a way of not being seen, since disruption of outlines depends on high contrast, so the patches of colour are themselves conspicuous.

The importance of high-contrast patterns for successful disruption was predicted in general terms by the artist Abbott Thayer in 1909 and explicitly by the zoologist Hugh B. Cott in 1940. Later experimental research has started to confirm these predictions. Disruptive patterns work best when all their components match the background.

While background matching works best for a single background, disruptive coloration is a more effective strategy when an animal or a military vehicle may have a variety of backgrounds.

Conversely, poisonous or distasteful animals that advertise their presence with warning coloration (aposematism) use patterns that emphasize rather than disrupt their outlines. For example, skunks, salamanders and monarch butterflies all have high-contrast patterns that display their outlines.

== Early research ==
The principle of "maximum disruptive contrast" in Hugh Cott's 1940 Adaptive Coloration in Animals, "showing the distractive effect upon the eye of patterns which contrast as violently as possible with the tone of their background". The examples are of a fish, an antelope, and a bird.

The artist Abbott Handerson Thayer in his 1909 book Concealing-Coloration in the Animal Kingdom argued that animals were concealed by a combination of countershading and "ruptive" marks, which together "obliterated" their self-shadowing and their shape. Thayer explained that:

Markings... of whatever sort, tend to obliterate,—to cancel, by their separate and conflicting pattern, the visibility of the details and boundaries of form.... If the bird's or butterfly's costume consists of sharply contrasted bold patterns of light and dark, in about equal proportions, its contour will be "broken up" against both light and dark—light failing to show against light, dark against dark. Such is apparently the basal and predominant use of almost all the bolder patterns in animals' costumes.

— Thayer

Hugh Cott's 1940 book Adaptive Coloration in Animals introduced ideas such as "maximum disruptive contrast". This uses streaks of boldly contrasting colour, which paradoxically make animals or military vehicles less visible by breaking up their outlines. He explains that in ideal conditions, background colour matching together with countershading would "suffice to render an animal absolutely invisible against a plain background", but at once adds that conditions are hardly ever ideal, as they are constantly changing, as is the light. Therefore, Cott argues, camouflage has to break up the perceived continuous surfaces of an object and its outlines. In his own words, "for effective concealment, it is essential that the tell-tale appearance of form should be destroyed." He draws an analogy with a pickpocket who carefully distracts your attention, arguing that:

The function of a disruptive pattern is to prevent, or to delay as long as possible, the first recognition of an object by sight... irregular patches of contrasted colours and tones ... tend to catch the eye of the observer and to draw his attention away from the shape which bears them.

— Cott

Further, Cott criticises unscientific attempts at camouflage, early in the Second World War, for not understanding the principles involved:

Various recent attempts to camouflage tanks, armoured cars and the roofs of buildings with paint reveal an almost complete failure by those responsible to grasp the essential factor in the disguise of surface continuity and of contour. Such work must be carried out with courage and confidence, for at close range objects properly treated will appear glaringly conspicuous. But they are not painted for deception at close range, but at ranges at which ... bombing raids are likely... And at these distances differences of tint ... blend and thus nullify the effect and render the work practically useless.

— Cott

The pioneering work of Thayer and Cott is endorsed in the 2006 review of disruptive coloration by Martin Stevens and colleagues, which notes that they proposed a "different form of camouflage" from the traditional "strategy of background matching" proposed by authors such as Alfred Russel Wallace (Darwinism, 1889), Edward Bagnall Poulton (The Colours of Animals, 1890) and Frank Evers Beddard (Animal Coloration, 1895); Stevens observes that background matching on its own would always fail because of "discontinuities between the boundary of the animal and the background".

== In animals ==
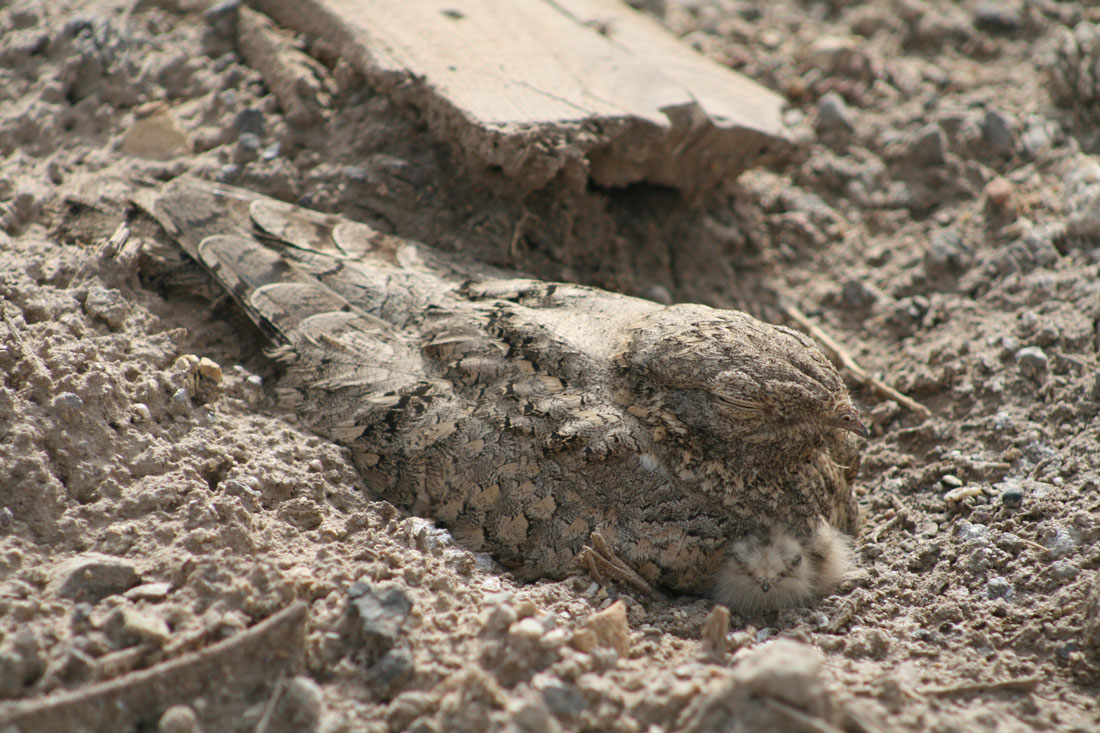
Egyptian nightjar, Caprimulgus aegyptius, rests on the sand, protected by its coloration, immobility, and concealment of shadow as it faces the sun.

Disruptive patterns use strongly contrasting markings such as spots or stripes to break up the outlines of an animal or military vehicle. Some predators, like the leopard, and some potential prey like the Egyptian nightjar, use disruptive patterns. Disruptive patterns are defined by A. Barbosa and colleagues as "characterized by high-contrast light and dark patches, in a nonrepetitive configuration, that also provide camouflage by disrupting the recognizable shape or orientation of the animal", as in the cuttlefish.

The strategy appears paradoxical and counter-intuitive as a method of camouflage, since disrupting outlines depends on using patches of colour which contrast strongly with each other, so the patches are themselves conspicuous. While background matching works best for a single background, disruptive coloration is a more effective strategy when an animal or a military vehicle may have a variety of backgrounds.

Martin Stevens and colleagues in 2006 made what they believed was the first experimental test that "disruptive coloration is effective even when some colour patches do not match the background and have a high contrast with both the background and adjacent pattern elements (disruptive contrast)". They used "moth-like targets", some matching the lightness of the background oak tree bark, other mismatching it, each with a dead mealworm. If the mealworm was removed it was assumed a bird predator had taken it: this could be distinguished from visits by other predators. They found that disruptive coloration provided the best protection from bird predators when the pattern was matched to background luminance, but even when elements in a pattern did not match, disruptive patterns were still better at reducing predation than either non-disruptive patterns or plain (unpatterned) control targets.

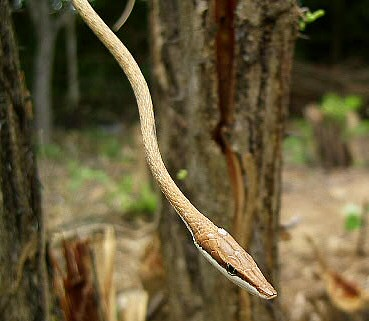
Mexican vine snake, Oxybelis aeneus, conceals its eye with a coincident dark stripe, contrasting with its pale underside.

Disruptive patterns can also conceal specific features. Animals such as fish, birds, frogs and snakes can readily be detected by their eyes, which are necessarily round and dark. Many species conceal the eye with a disruptive eye mask, sometimes contrasting with a stripe above the eye, making it seem just part of a dark area of background. Cott called this a special case of a "coincident disruptive pattern".

Disruptive and distractive camouflage both rely on conspicuous markings but differ in their mechanisms and so in the size and position of the markings for greatest effectiveness.

Another camouflage mechanism, distractive markings, also involves conspicuous marks, and has for a century since Thayer's initial description was conflated with it, but the two require different kinds of marking. For distraction, the markings should be small and should avoid the prey's outline so as to take attention away from it, whereas disruptive markings should contact the outline so as to break it up.

=== The opposite case: aposematism ===
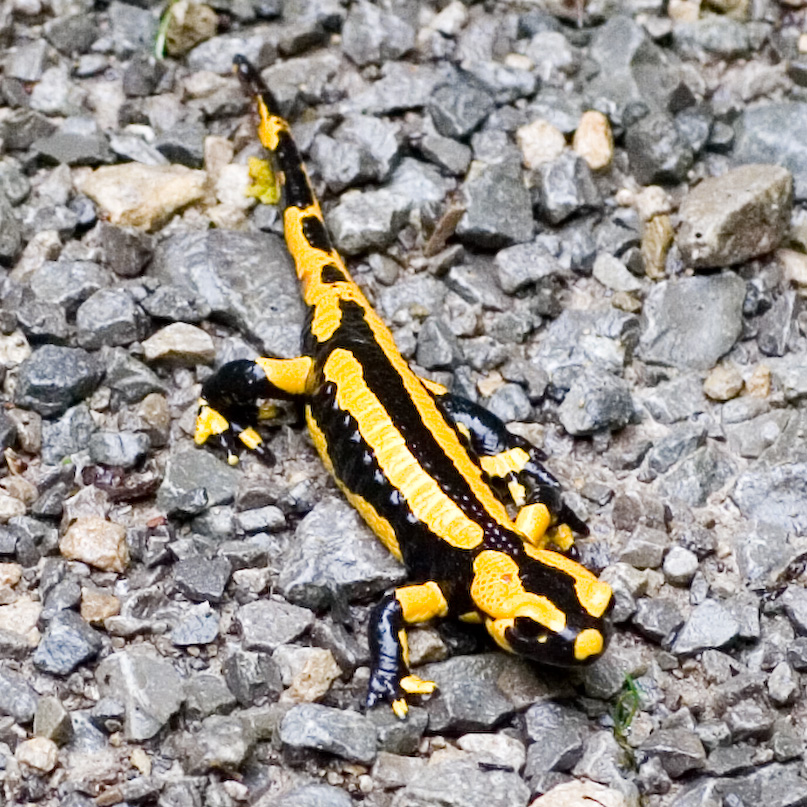
Opposite of disruption: The fire salamander, Salamandra salamandra, advertises its inedibility with bright warning colours, in patches that emphasize its body shape.

Many poisonous or distasteful animals that advertise their presence with warning coloration (aposematism) use patterns that emphasize rather than disrupt their outlines. For example, skunks, salamanders and monarch butterflies all have high contrast patterns that display their outlines. These advertising patterns exploit the opposite principle to disruptive coloration, for what is in effect the exactly opposite effect: to make the animal as conspicuous as possible. Some Lepidoptera, including the wood tiger moth, are aposematic and disruptively coloured; against a green, vegetative background their bright aposematic coloration stands out, but on the ground their wings camouflage them among dead leaves and dirt.

=== A disputed case: the giraffe ===
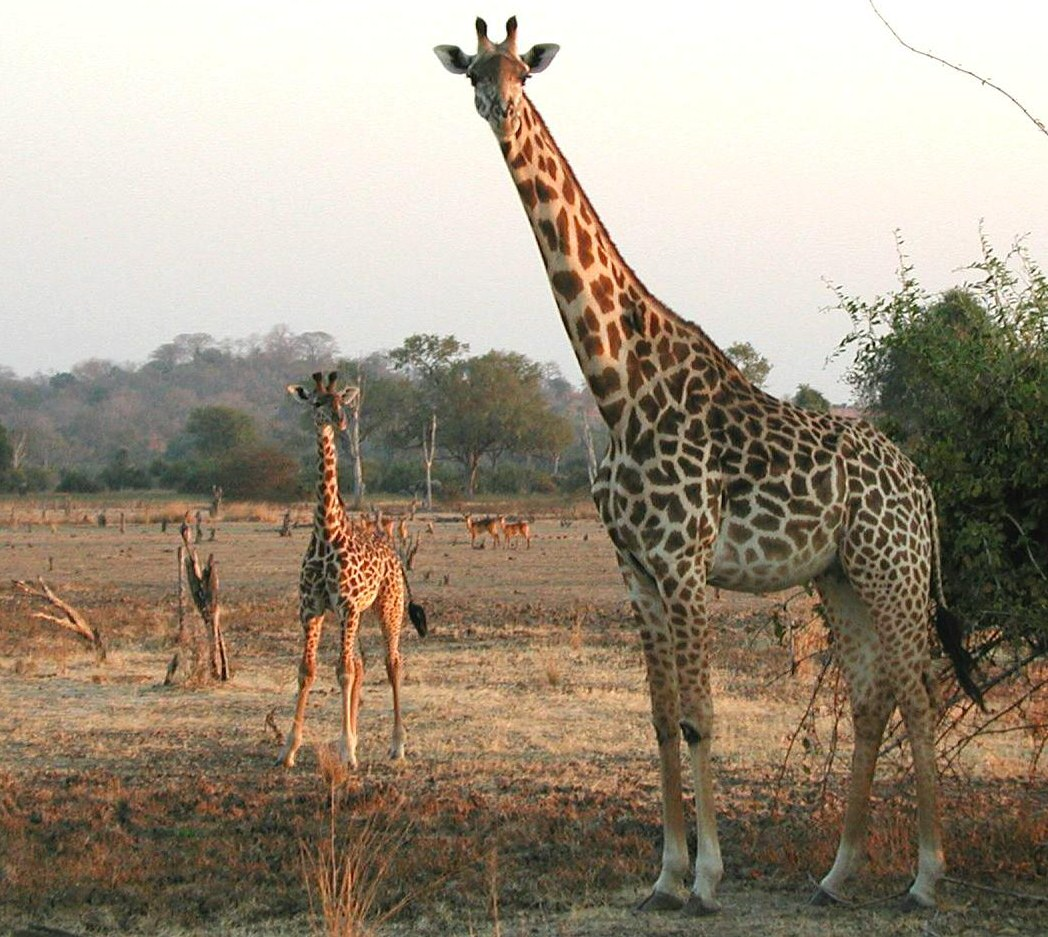
A conspicuous giraffe mother can defend herself, but her calf relies on its camouflage.

The presence of bold markings does not in itself prove that an animal relies on camouflage. According to Mitchell, adult giraffes are "inescapably conspicuous", making the conclusion that their patterns are for camouflage appear counterintuitive: but when standing among trees and bushes, their camouflage is effective at even a few metres' distance.

Further, young giraffes are much more vulnerable to predation than adults: between 60% and 75% of calves die within a year. Mothers hide their calves, which spend much of the time lying down in cover. Since the presence of a mother does not affect survival, Mitchell suggests that young giraffes must be extremely well camouflaged. This is supported by the fact that coat markings are strongly inherited. Conversely, far from hiding, adult giraffes move about to gain the best view of an approaching predator, relying on their size and ability to defend themselves even from lions.

=== Other ways of hiding outlines ===
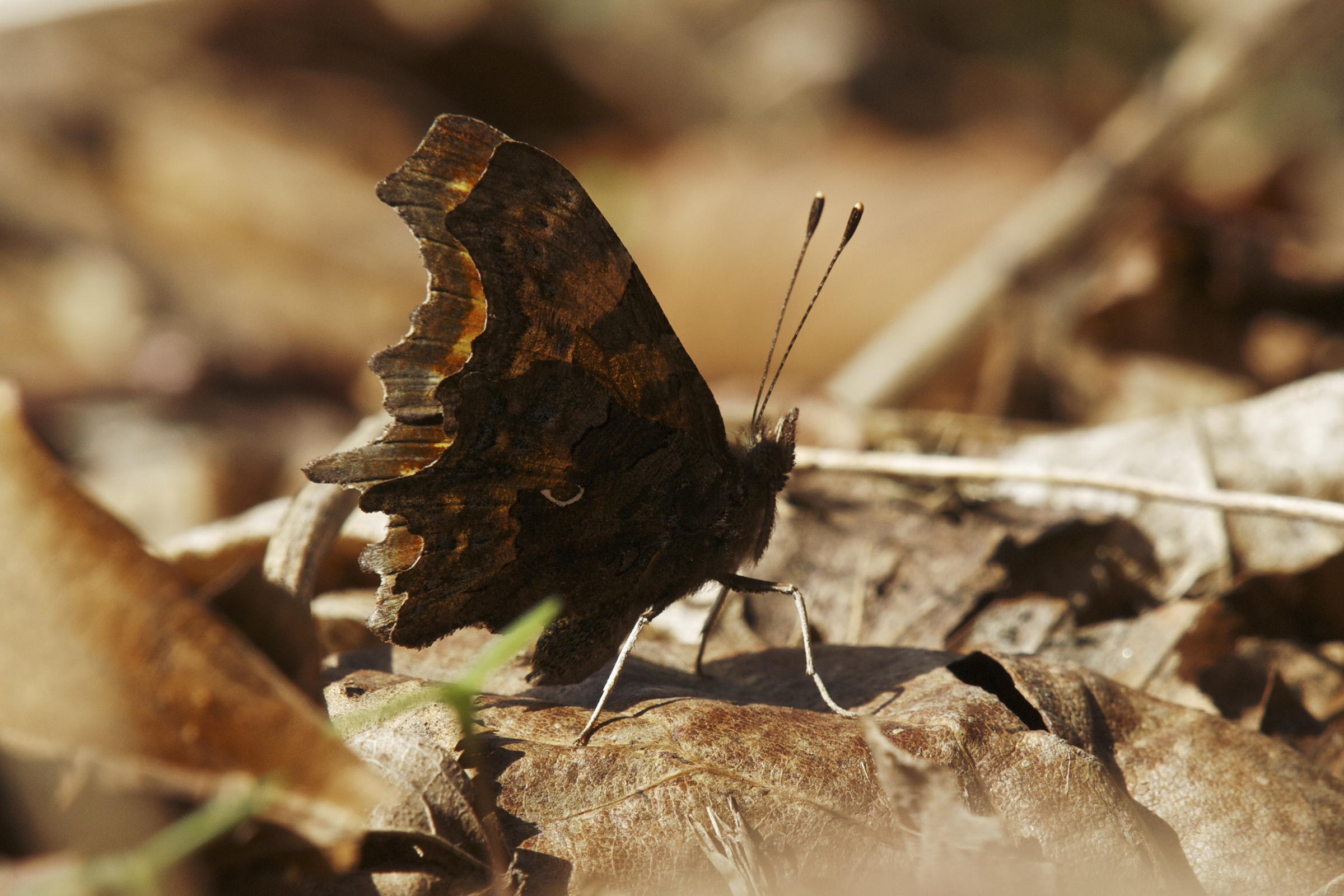
The irregular outline of comma butterfly Polygonia c-album avoids a typical butterfly shape.

The outlines of an animal's body can be made hard to see by other methods, such as by using a highly irregular outline. For example, the comma butterfly, Polygonia c-album, is highly cryptic when its wings are closed, with cryptic colours, disruptive pattern, and irregular outer margins to the wings.

== In plants ==
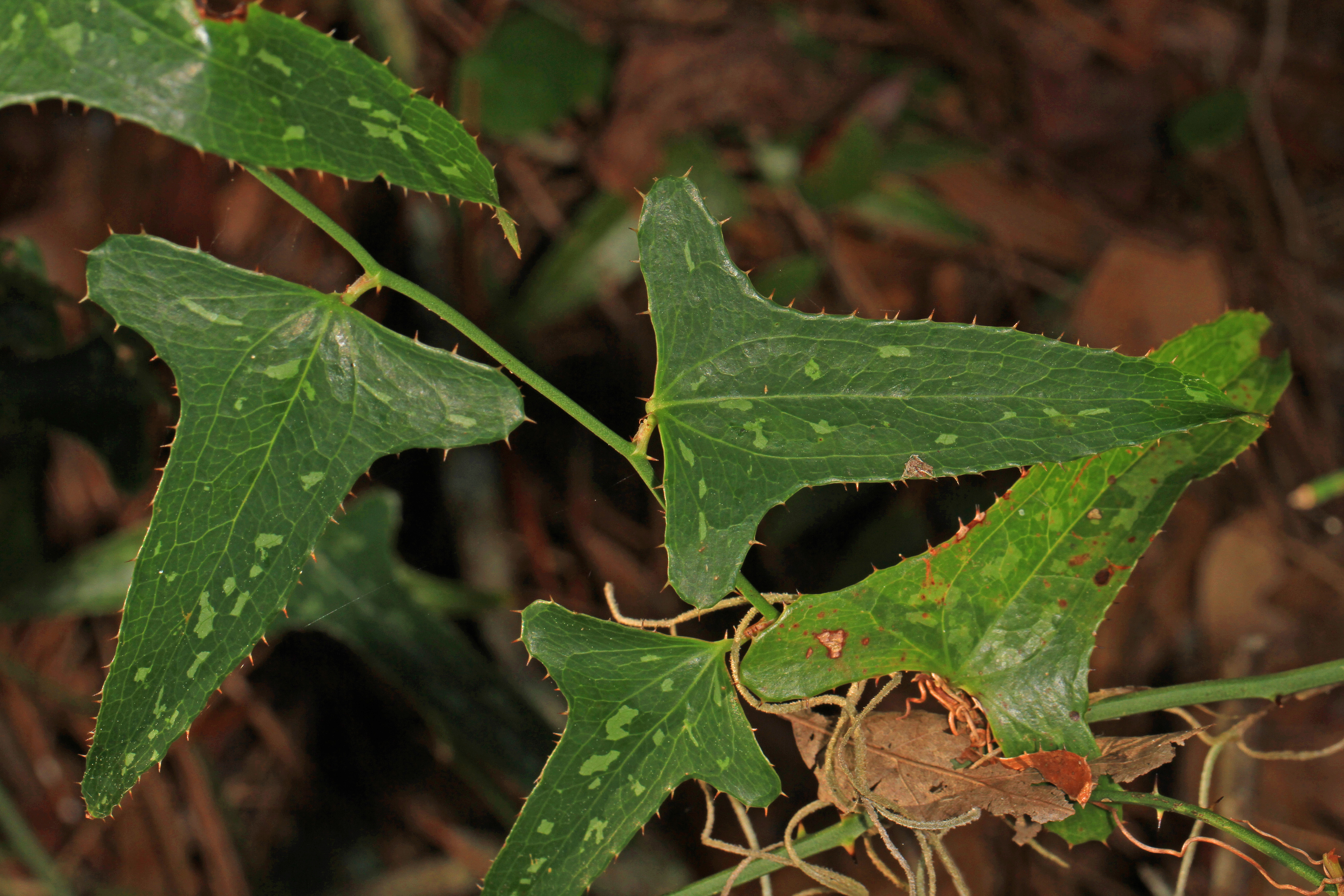
Many understory plants, such as the saw greenbriar, Smilax bona-nox, are variegated with pale markings which may serve as camouflage.

The possibility of protective coloration in plants has been little studied. T. J. Givnish and Simcha Lev-Yadun have proposed that leaf variegation with white spots may serve as camouflage in forest understory plants, where there is a dappled background. Lev-Yadun has also suggested, however, that similar markings serve as conspicuous warning coloration in well-defended thorny plants of open habitats, where the background is uniformly bright. Givnish found a correlation of leaf mottling with closed habitats. Disruptive camouflage would have a clear evolutionary advantage in plants: they would tend to escape from being eaten by herbivores; and the hypothesis is testable.

== Military usage ==
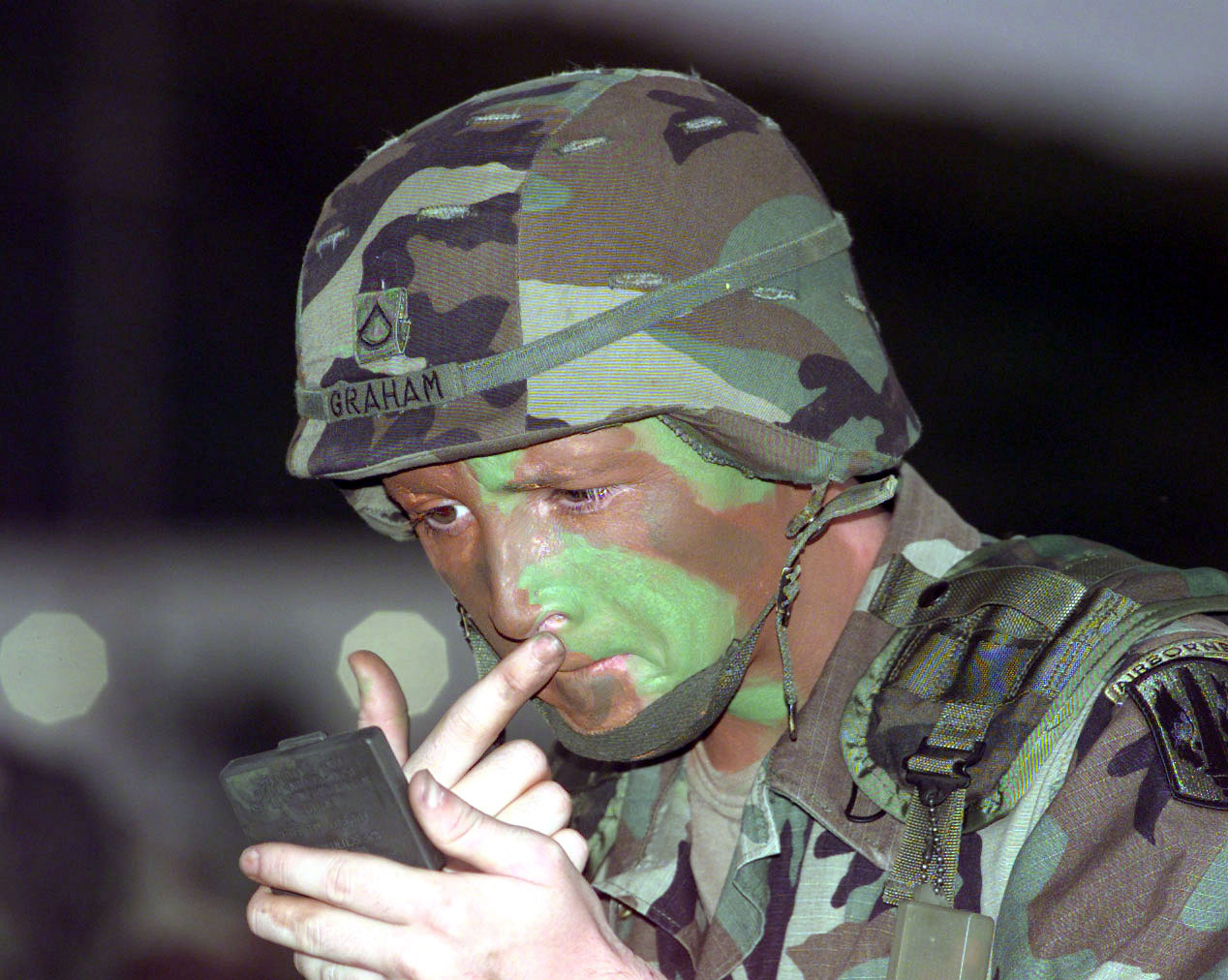
A soldier applying a disruptive pattern to his face. His helmet and jacket are both disruptively patterned.

Disruptive coloration is common in military usage, for military vehicles, for firing positions and other installations, and for individual soldiers, where uniforms, equipment such as helmets, and face paint may be used to break up outlines and features. Disruptive coloration, however, does not always achieve crypsis on its own, as an animal or a military target may be given away by other factors including shape, shine, and shadow.

US Woodland camouflage pattern

Many military camouflage patterns since the 1940s have been disruptively coloured, and with the issue of US Woodland pattern to United States armed forces from 1981, disruptive pattern became a dominant feature of military uniforms. From 1969, Disruptive Pattern Material (DPM) began to replace plain material for uniforms in the British Armed Forces and was later used by many other armies.

=== Challenges ===
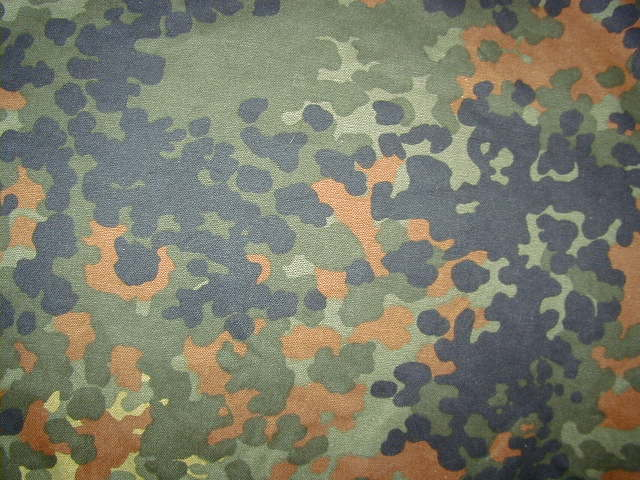
Modern German Flecktarn 1990 is a non-digital pattern designed to disrupt outlines at various distances.

Three major challenges face the design of disruptively patterned uniforms. Firstly, units frequently move from one terrain to another, where the background colours and contrasts may differ greatly. A uniform designed for woodland will be too strongly contrasting for desert use, and too green for urban use. Therefore, no single camouflage pattern is effective in all terrains. The American UCP of 2004 attempted to suit all environments but was withdrawn after a few years of service. Terrain specific patterns like "Berlin camouflage", which was applied to British vehicles operating in Berlin during the Cold War, have sometimes been developed but are ineffective in other terrains. Secondly, the effectiveness of any pattern in disrupting a soldier's outlines varies with lighting, depending on the weather and the height of the sun in the sky. And thirdly, any given patch of printed colour varies in apparent size with distance from the enemy observing the pattern. A pattern printed with small patches of colour blends into a single perceived mass at a certain range, defeating the disruptive effect. Conversely, a pattern printed with large patches of colour appears conspicuous at shorter ranges. This problem has been solved with pixellated shapes, often designed digitally, that provide a fractal-like range of patch sizes, enabling them to be effectively disruptive both at close range and at a distance. The first genuinely digital camouflage pattern was the Canadian CADPAT, soon followed by the American MARPAT. A pixellated appearance is not essential for this effect, though it is simpler to design and to print.

== Examples ==
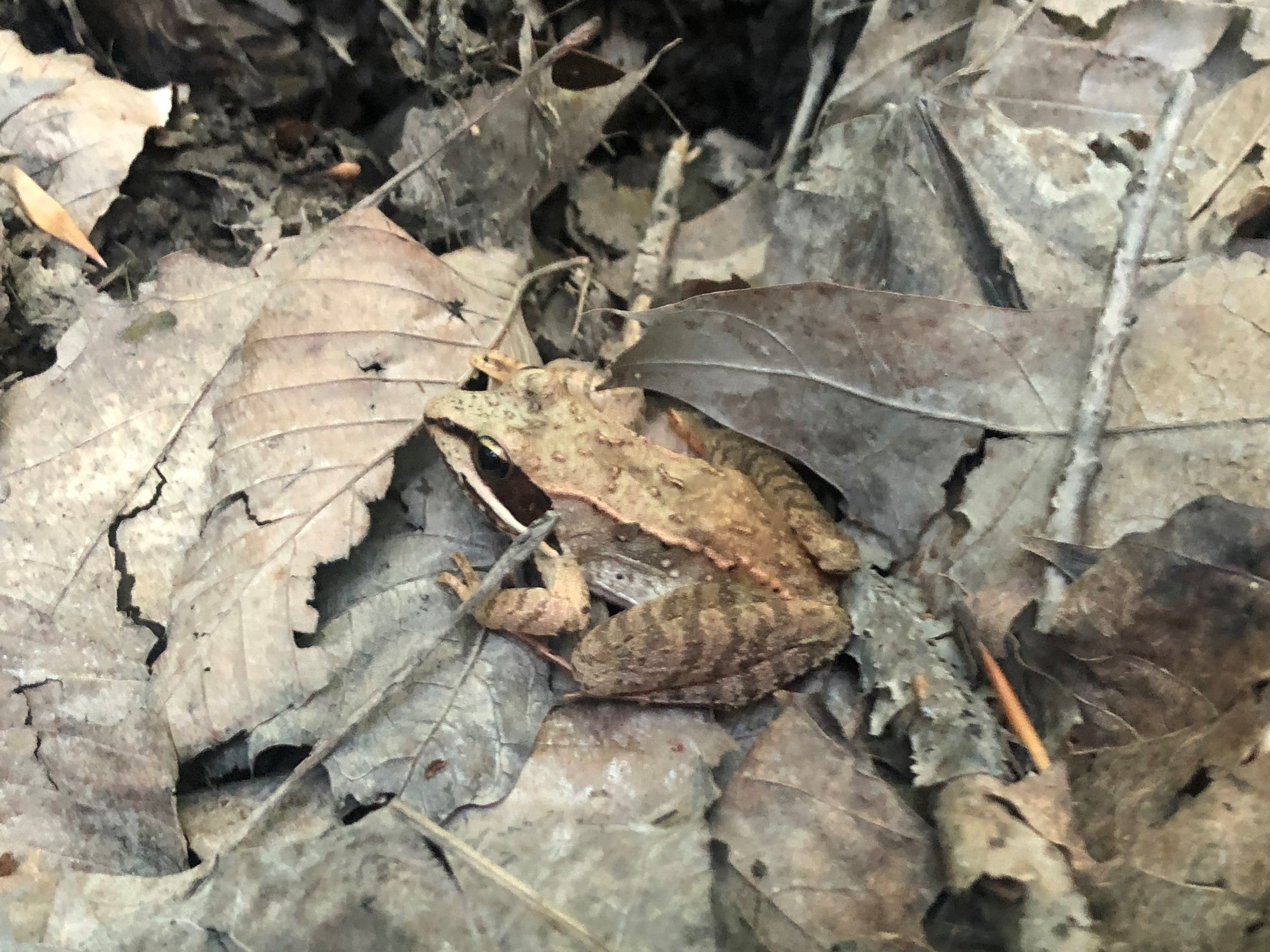
Wood frog among fallen leaves

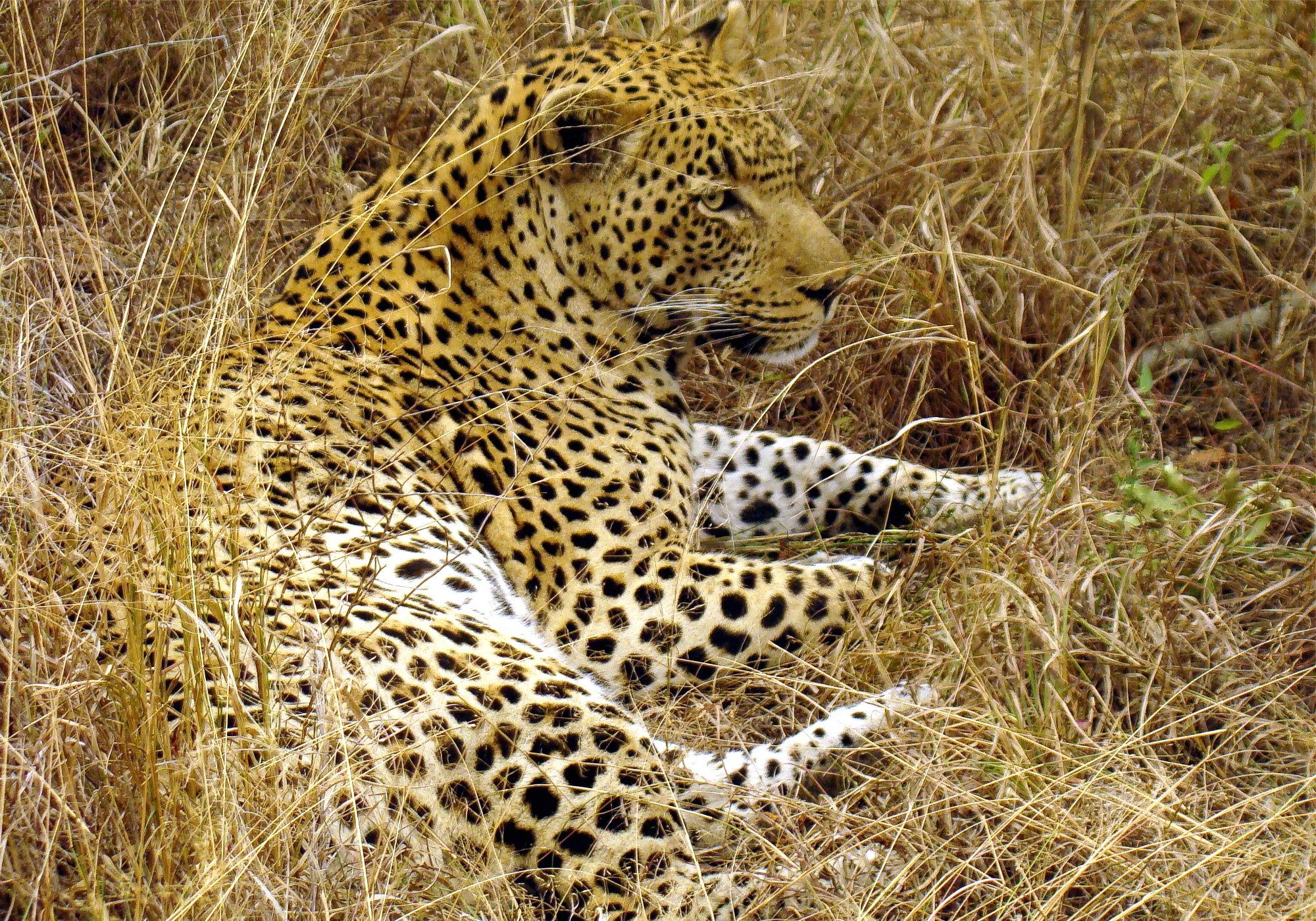
Leopard: a disruptively camouflaged (and countershaded) predator

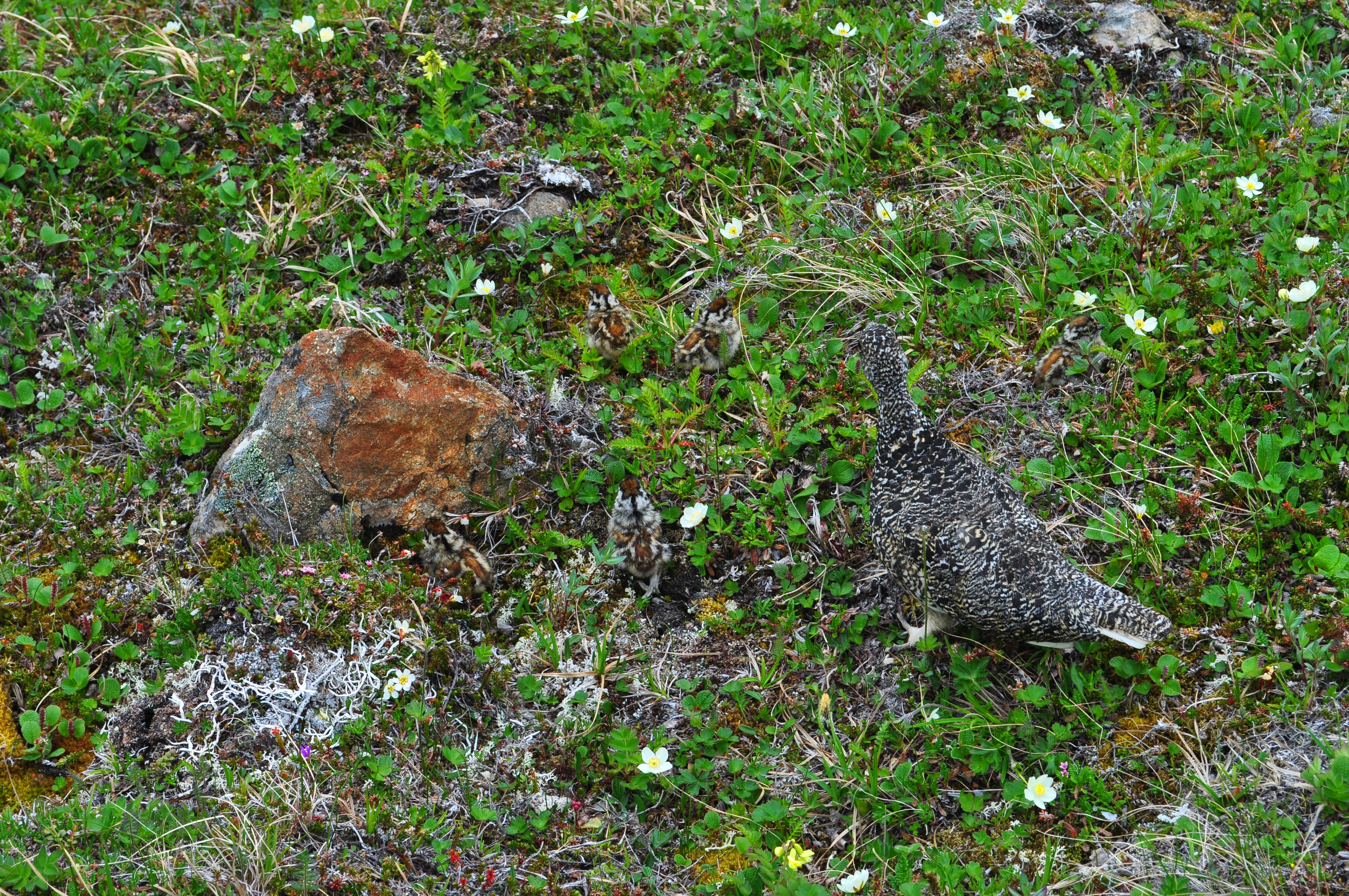
A ptarmigan and five chicks with exceptional disruptive camouflage

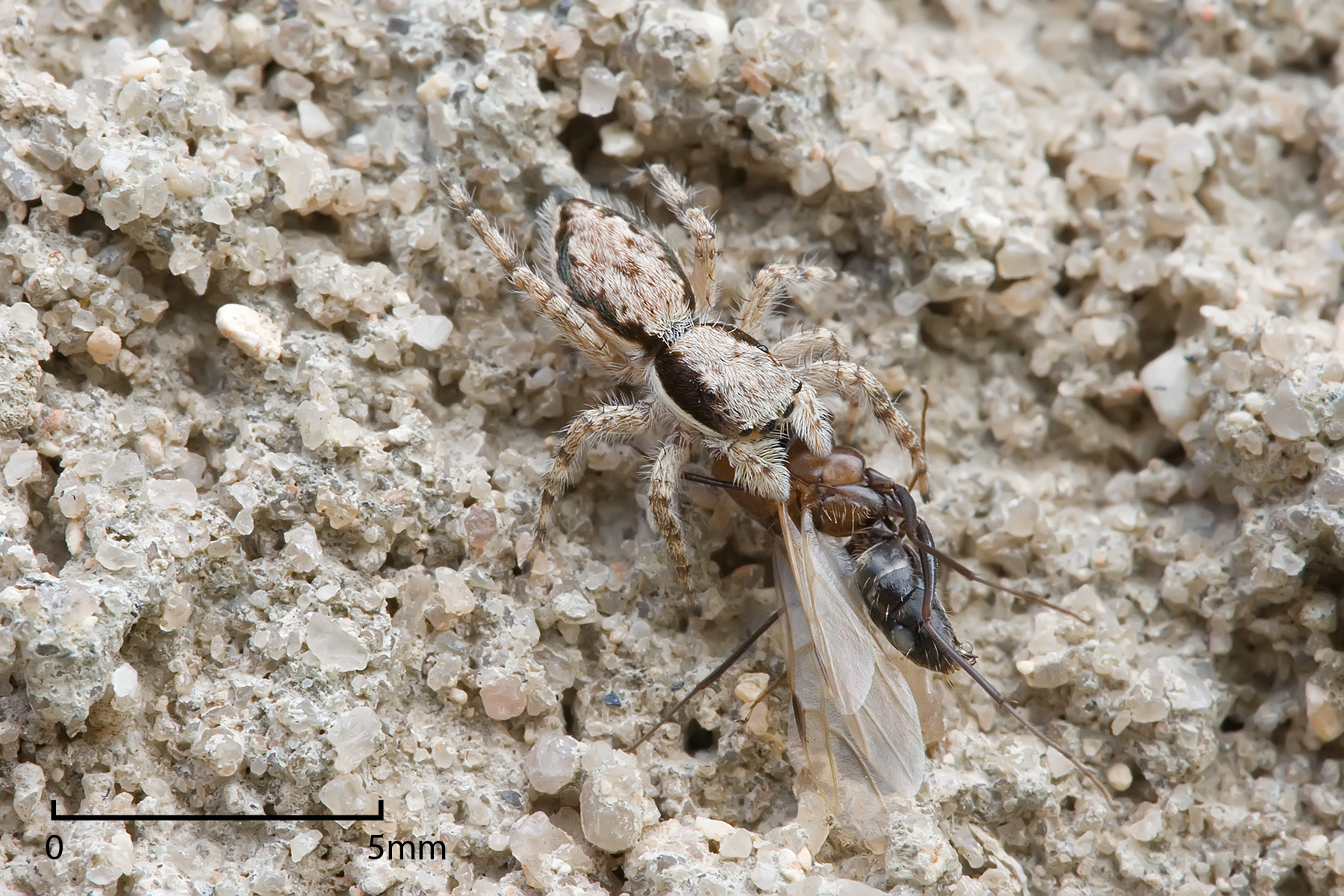
Jumping spider: a disruptively camouflaged invertebrate predator

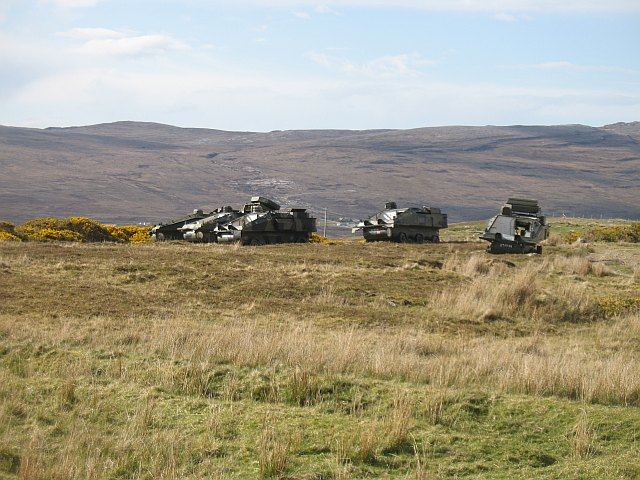
"Shape, shine, shadow" make these "camouflaged" military vehicles easily visible, their outlines not disrupted.

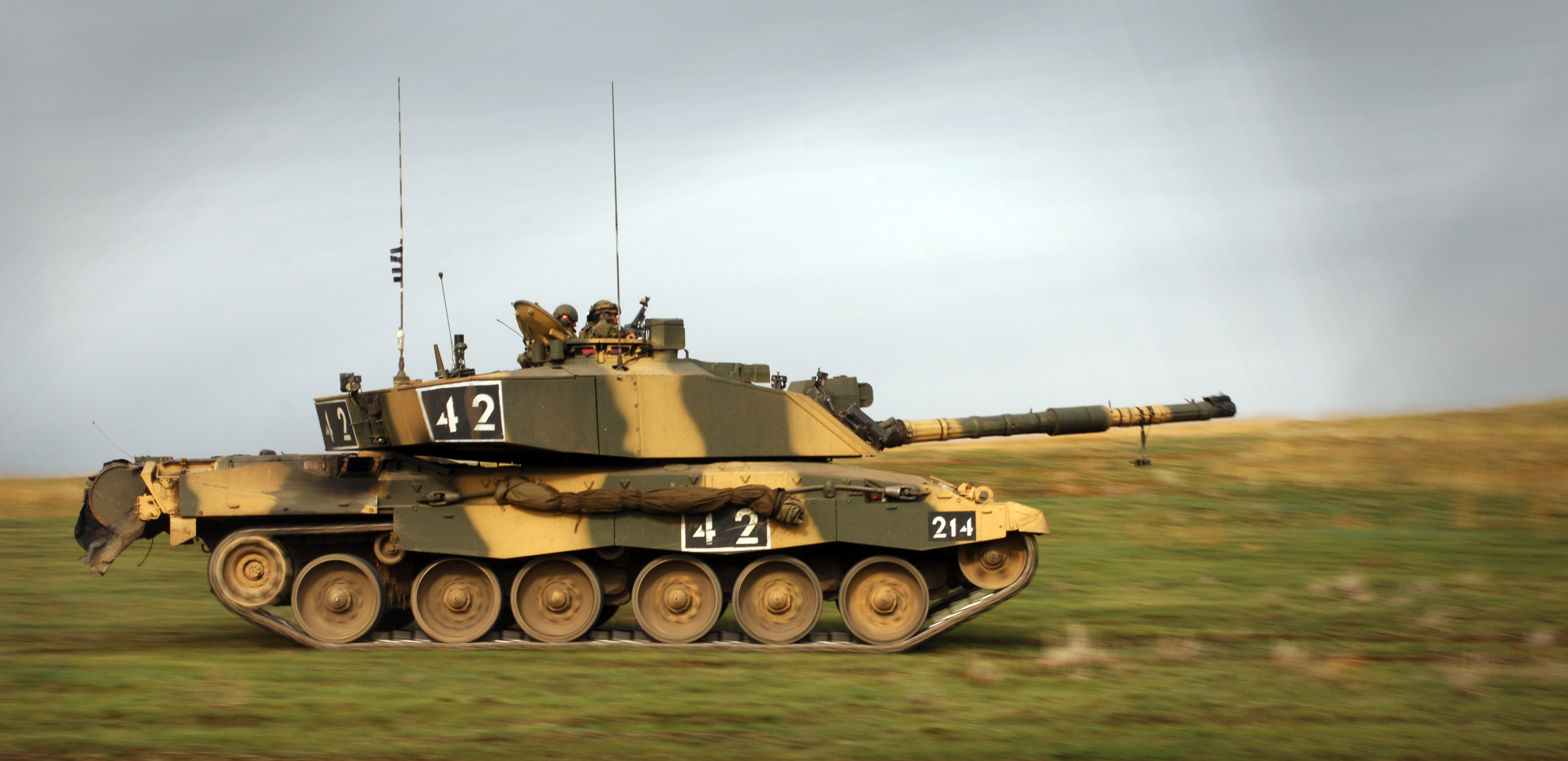
A British Challenger 2 tank painted in bold disruptive pattern of sand and green

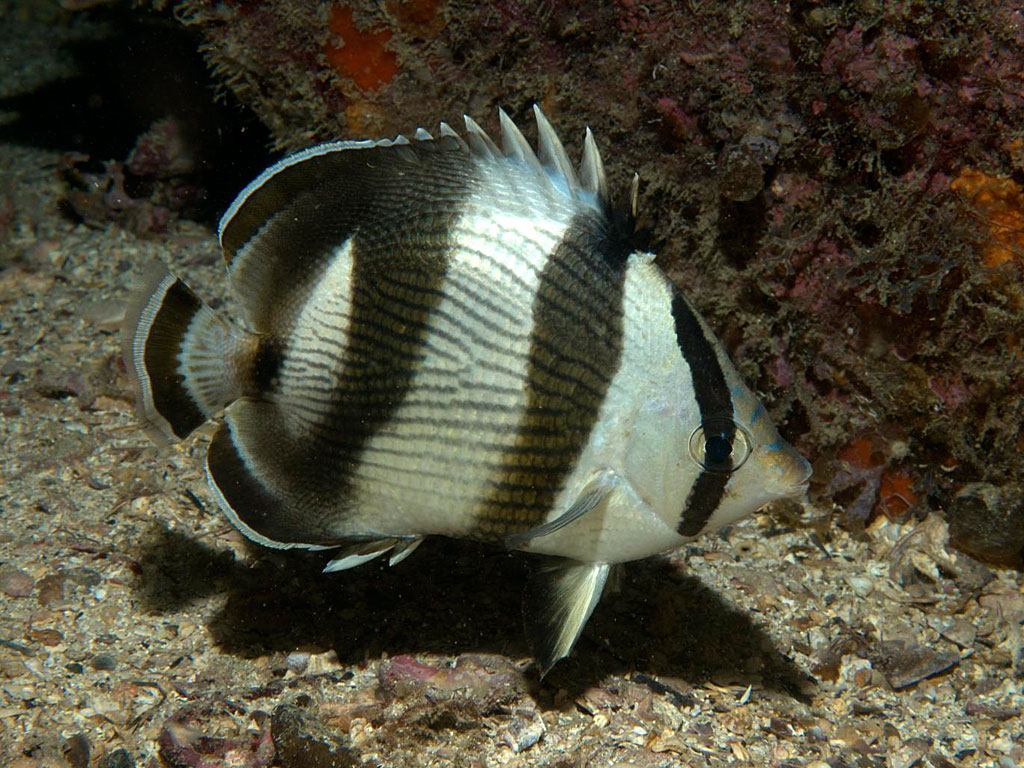
The banded butterflyfish, Chaetodon striatus, has strong disruptive bands through the body and concealing the eye.

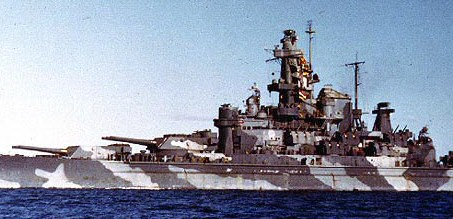
USS Alabama wearing Measure 12 ship camouflage during World War II

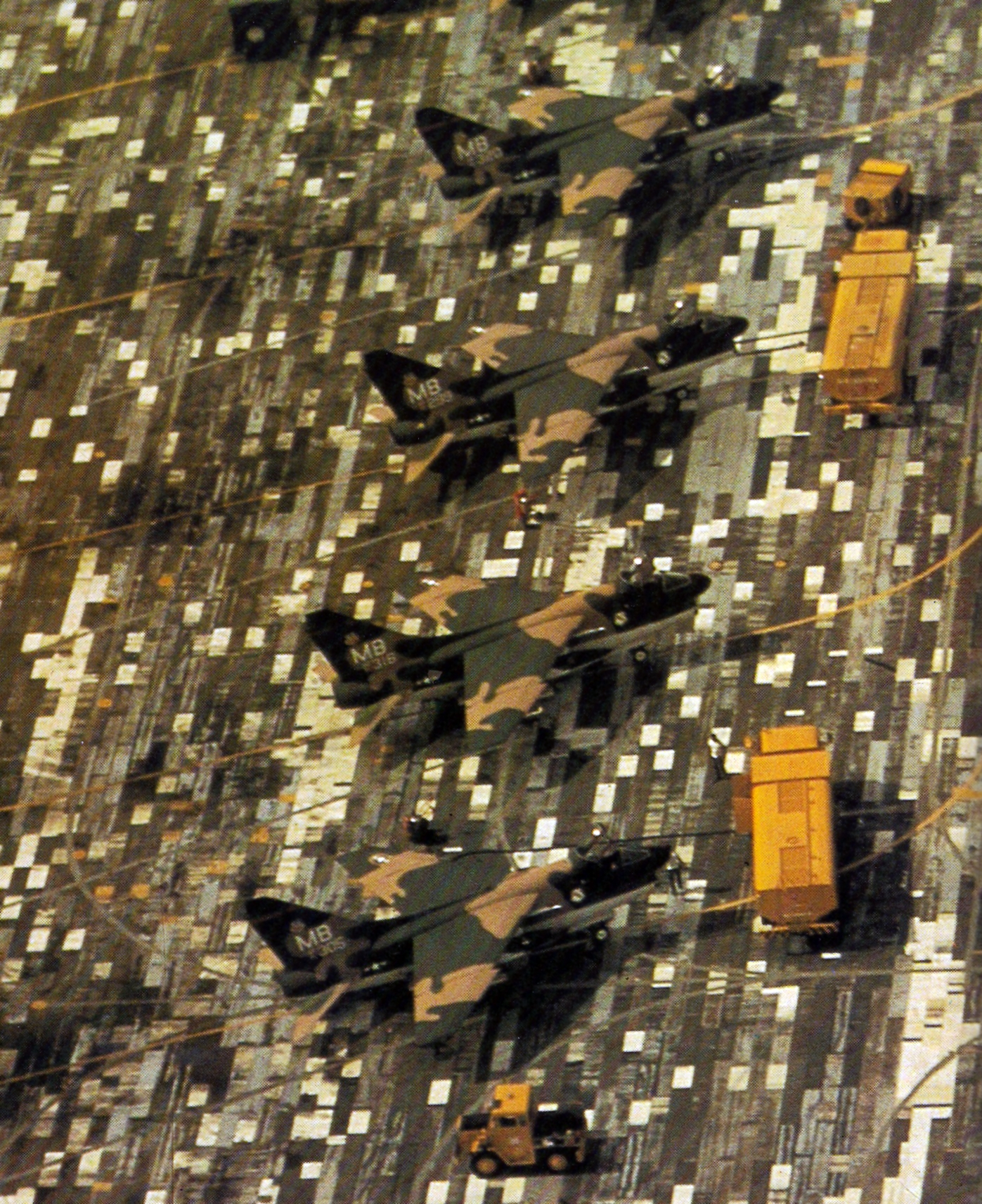
Disruptively camouflaged A-7D Corsairs on a disruptively painted concrete surface, Thailand, 1972

== Sources ==
- Cott, Hugh B. (1940). Adaptive Coloration in Animals. New York: Oxford University Press.
- Thayer, Abbott H.; Thayer, Gerald H. (1909). Concealing-Coloration in the Animal Kingdom. New York: Macmillan. doi:10.5962/bhl.title.57368.
