= Disruptive eye mask =

Camouflage to conceal the eye

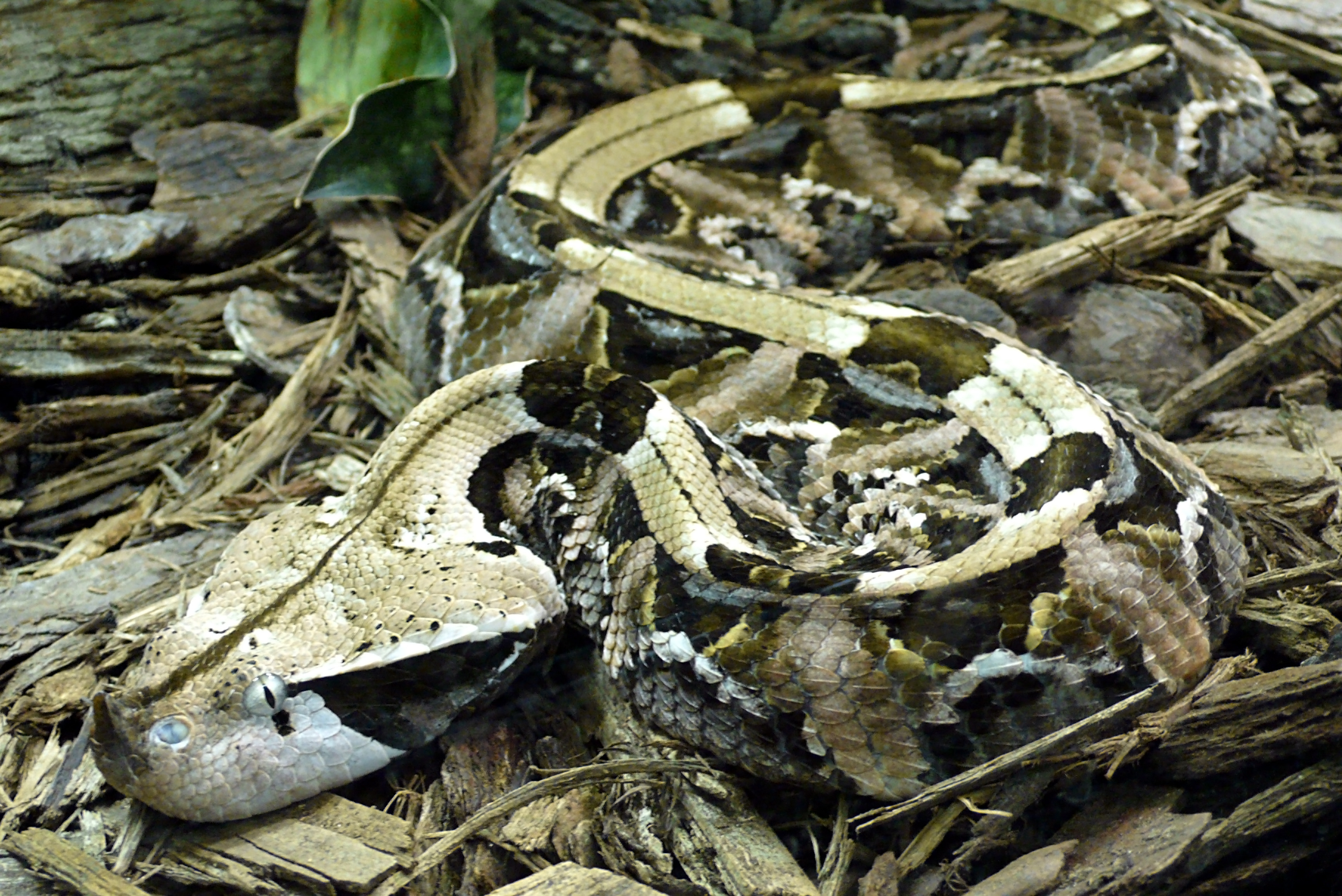
Gaboon viper, its eye concealed by a disruptive mask

Disruptive eye masks are camouflage markings that conceal the eyes of an animal from its predators or prey. They are used by prey, to avoid being seen by predators, and by predators to help them approach their prey.

The eye has a distinctive shape and dark coloration dictated by its function, and it is housed in the vulnerable head, making it a natural target for predators. It can be camouflaged by a suitable disruptive pattern arranged to run up to or through the eye, sometimes forming a camouflage eyestripe. The illusion is completed in some animals by a false eye or false head somewhere else on the body, in a form of automimicry.

Disruptive eye masks are seen on a variety of animals, both invertebrates such as grasshoppers and vertebrates, including fish, frogs, birds and snakes. Eye masks were first noticed by the American artist Abbott Handerson Thayer in 1909, and analysed extensively by the zoologist Hugh Cott in 1940. However, in 2005 the evolutionary zoologist Tim Caro could still observe that the assumption that eye masks served as camouflage had not been tested systematically.

== History ==
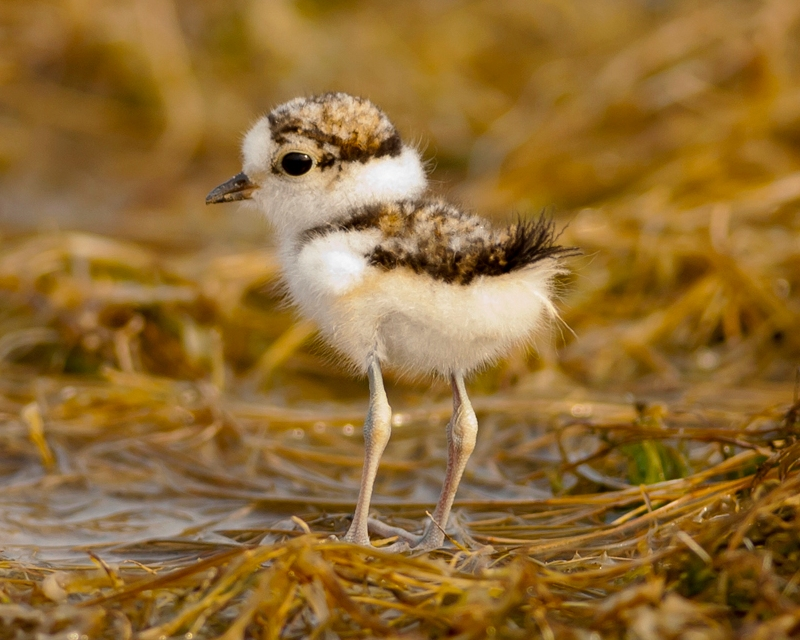
Early investigators Abbott Handerson Thayer and Hugh Cott noted that active juvenile birds like this little ringed plover chick have boldly disruptive patterns that camouflage the eye.

Cott used this diagram to illustrate "the inherent conspicuousness of an eye-spot", and hence to justify the need for a disruptive eye mask.

The American artist Abbott Handerson Thayer mentioned the "masking" of the eyes of birds and mammals in his 1909 book Concealing-Coloration in the Animal Kingdom, stating that this was found mainly in birds, such as plovers, and predatory mammals. He noted that "it is very effective .. as it completely breaks the eye's otherwise conspicuous circular or oval outline.

The zoologist Hugh Cott identified the value of concealing the eye in his 1940 book Adaptive Coloration in Animals. He notes the "inherent conspicuousness of an eye-spot", which "stands out from everything else, and rivets the attention", making the point with a diagram containing one small eyespot and many larger features: the eyespot immediately attracts the viewer's attention. The image has been used elsewhere, for example in Tim Newark's 2007 book on camouflage, where Newark noted that Cott's image proved the point, as "the eye of a vertebrate, with its dense black pupil, stands out from the most jumbled backgrounds, as Cott's illustration demonstrates." Cott argued that "no scheme of camouflage will be completely effective which does not mask or modify the appearance of the eye". He mentioned, as "beautiful examples" of face patterns that achieve this, the swamp viper and the Gaboon viper. In his words:

The disruptive value of a pattern lies in its tendency to hide the real form of an animal by suggesting a false form to the eye. So long as the false configuration is recognized in preference to the real one, concealment will be effected.

Cott described disruptive eye masks as a special case of a coincident disruptive pattern, one that provides camouflage by joining together parts of the body to create a new appearance which contradicts the actual structures present. On camouflage eyestripes, he noted that "more or less well-defined ocular bands or stripes" are found in many species of bird, including the nuthatch, snipe, whimbrel, ringed plover, and turnstone, and thought it significant that these patterns were associated with active young that leave the nest early, as in the ringed plover. He recorded that "what appear to be markings of similar significance" are found in mammals such as gemsbok, sable antelope, Grant's gazelle and vizcacha.

In 1989, J. L. Cloudsley-Thompson noted that camouflage eyestripes are also found in many reptiles including slender arboreal vine snakes, numerous tropical fish such as the angelfish Pterophyllum scalare and the gar Lepisosteus platostomus, and a wide variety of amphibians including the common frog.

The evolutionary zoologist Tim Caro observed in 2005 that "the whole topic of disruptive coloration needs systematic analysis". Caro noted that in mammals, "no systematic tests of this idea are available", but that dark patches around the eyes, which would tend to draw attention to the eye instead of camouflaging it, are associated with grassland and terrestrial carnivores as well as riparian animals, suggesting the function of reducing glare, or perhaps of aposematism.

== Pattern ==
G. W. Barlow, noting Cott's examples, analysed fish "eye-lines" in 1972, finding a relationship between angle of line and both body shape and angle of forehead. He found that fast-swimming species had longitudinal lines and long bodies; deep-bodied fish had vertical bars and the ability to turn abruptly. Many barred patterns were in his opinion "obviously an adaptation for crypsis" (camouflage). He concluded that stripes and bars were both social signals and antipredator adaptations.

In 1981, Leah and Benjamin Gavish tested patterns that conceal birds' eyes using patterns and human observers. They found that patterns which allow the eye to protrude from the dark area concealed the eye best, calling this the "borderline eye effect".

Some animals such as butterflyfish combine the camouflaging of the eye with an eyespot somewhere else on the body, possibly giving the impression that the animal's head is located there. In 2013, Karin Kjernsmo and Sami Merilaita showed using artificial prey and predatory fish (three-spined sticklebacks) that such eyespots diverted predators' attacks from the vulnerable head.

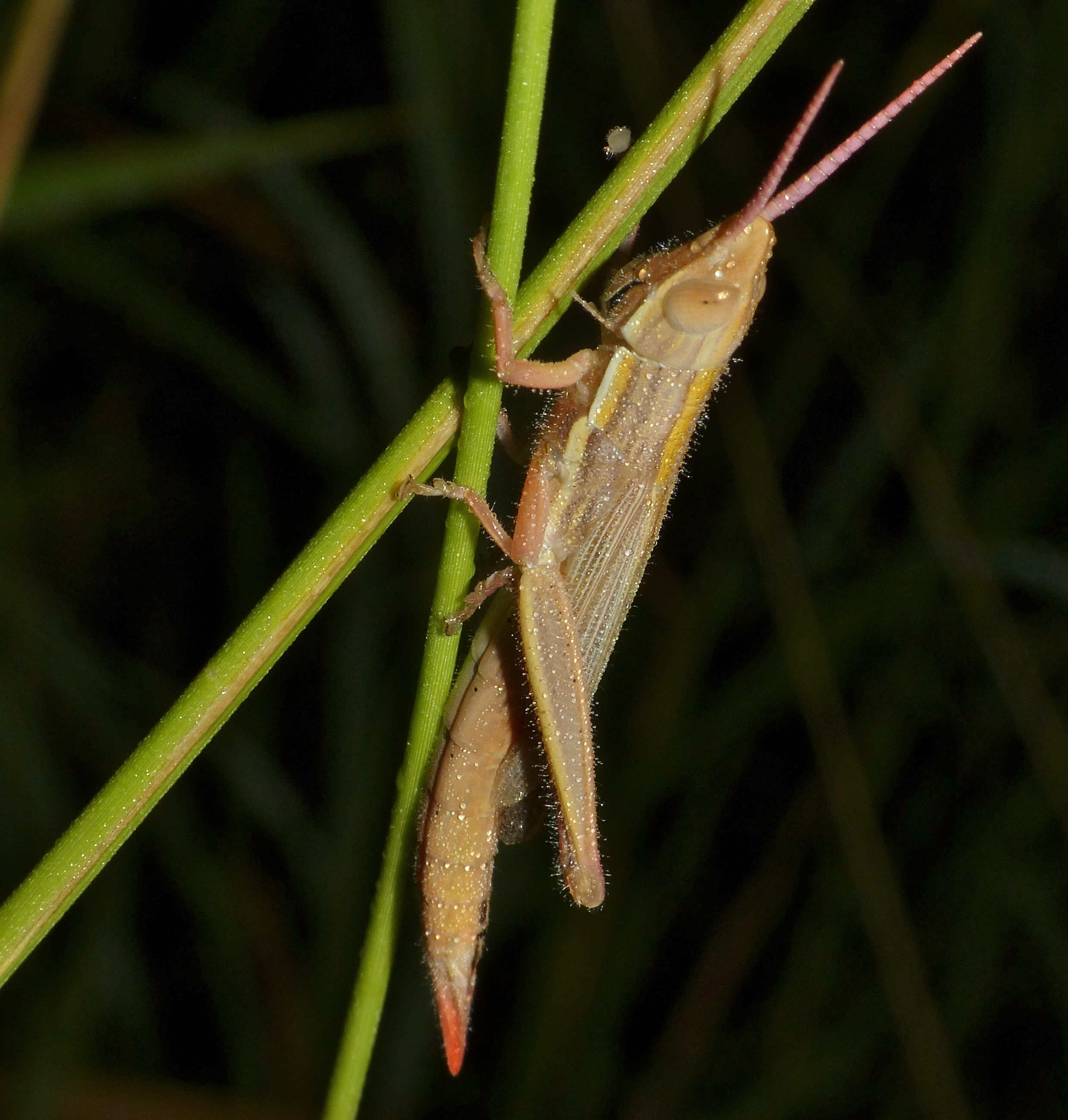
The elegant grass-mimicking grasshopper has stripes that join head and eye to the body.

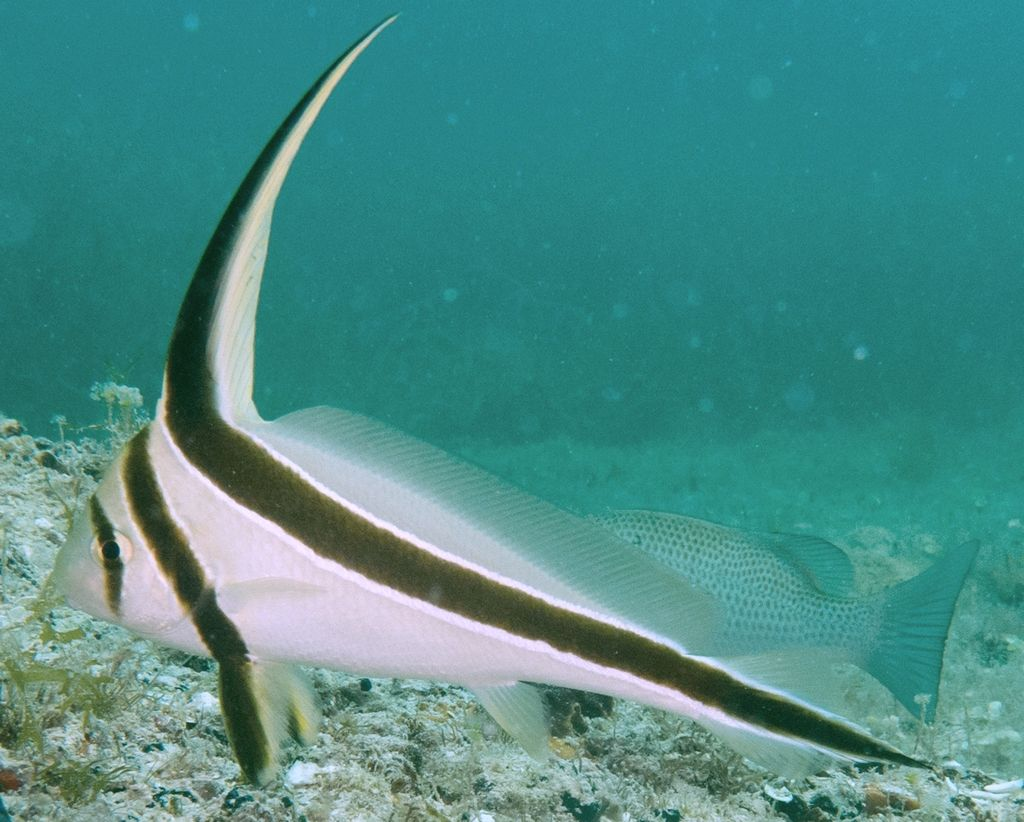
The jack-knifefish has a strongly disruptive pattern on body and through the eye.

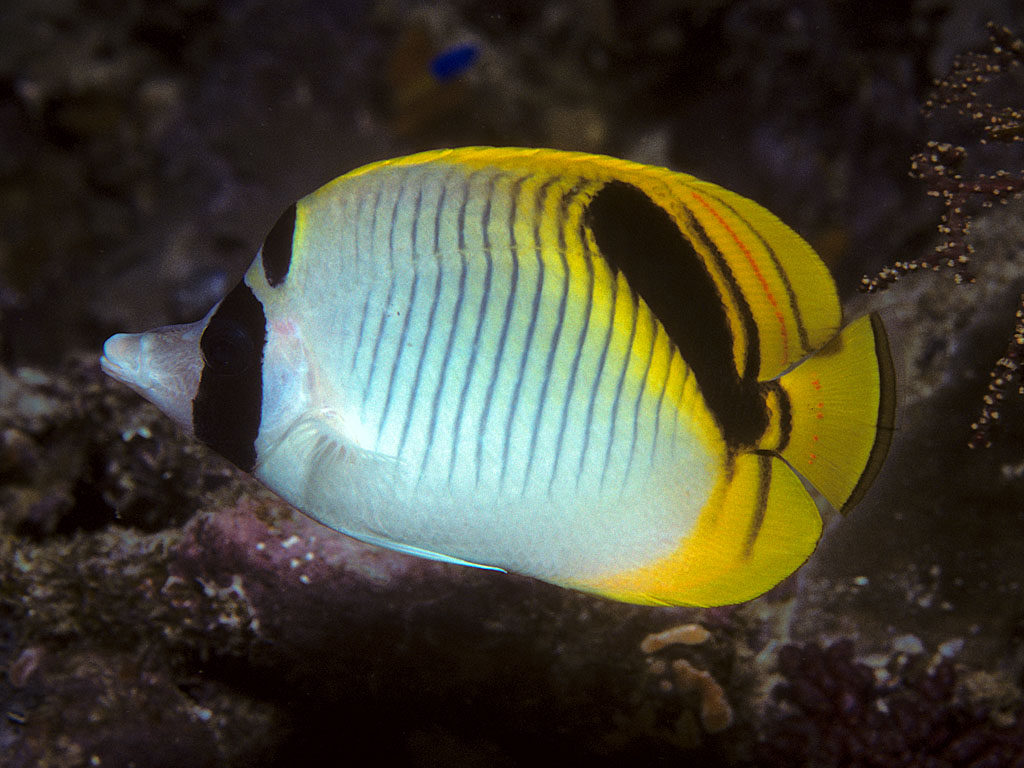
The eye of the spot-nape butterflyfish is concealed by a bold eyestripe.

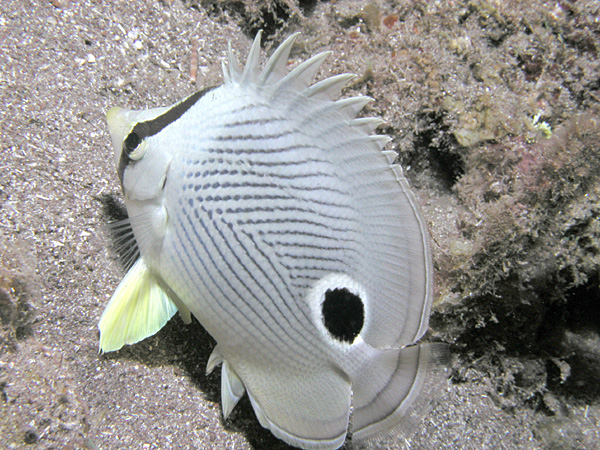
In the four-eye butterflyfish, eyestripe camouflage is combined with a conspicuous eyespot near the tail.

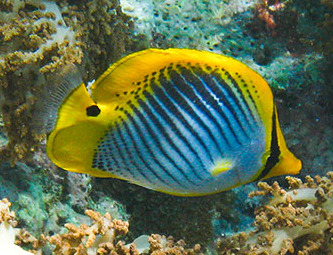
The tail-spot butterflyfish is conspicuously coloured, but its eye is camouflaged and the tail has a false eye, adding to the illusion by distracting predators' attention from the head.

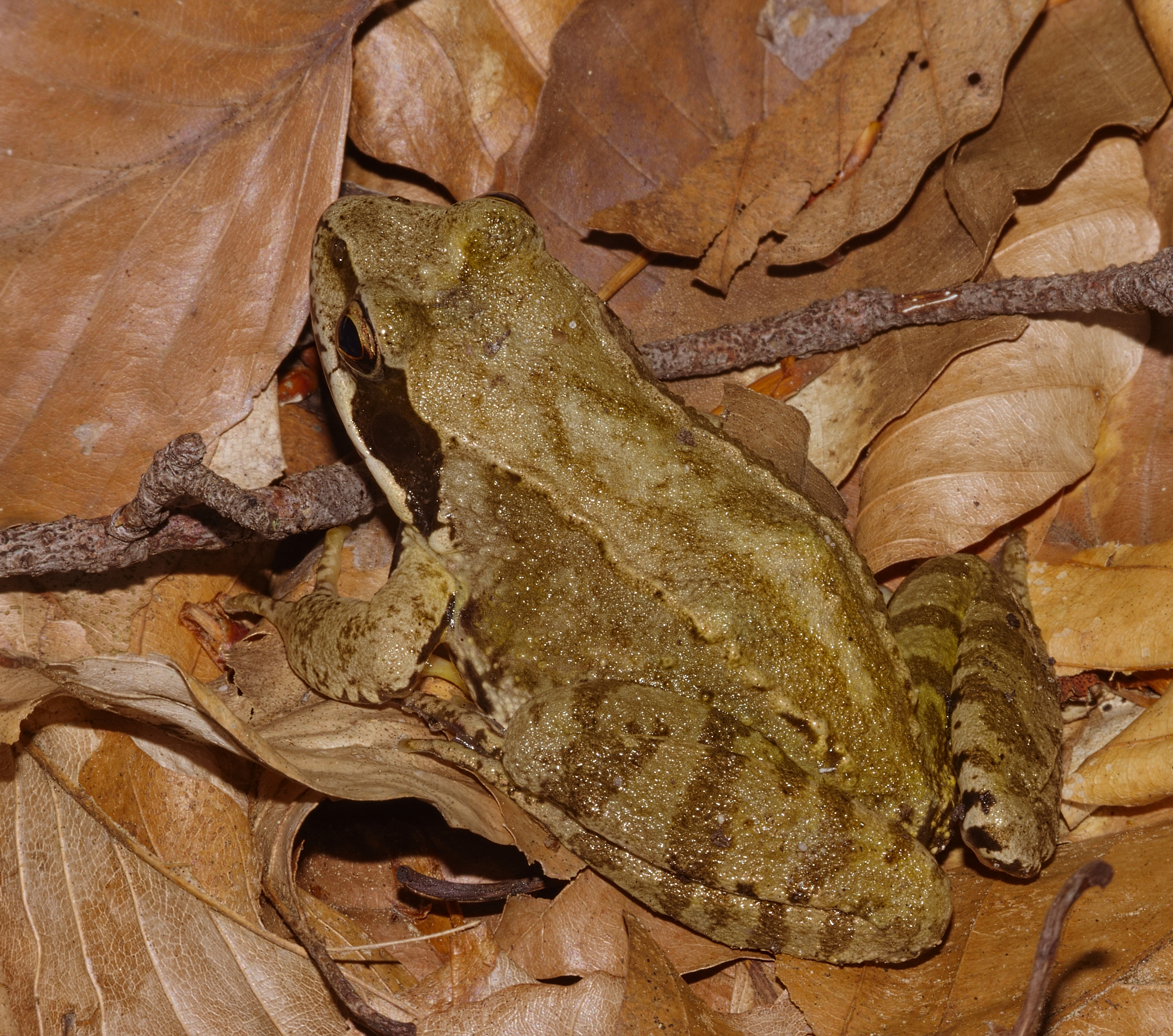
The common frog has a disruptively patterned body and an eyestripe concealing the eye.

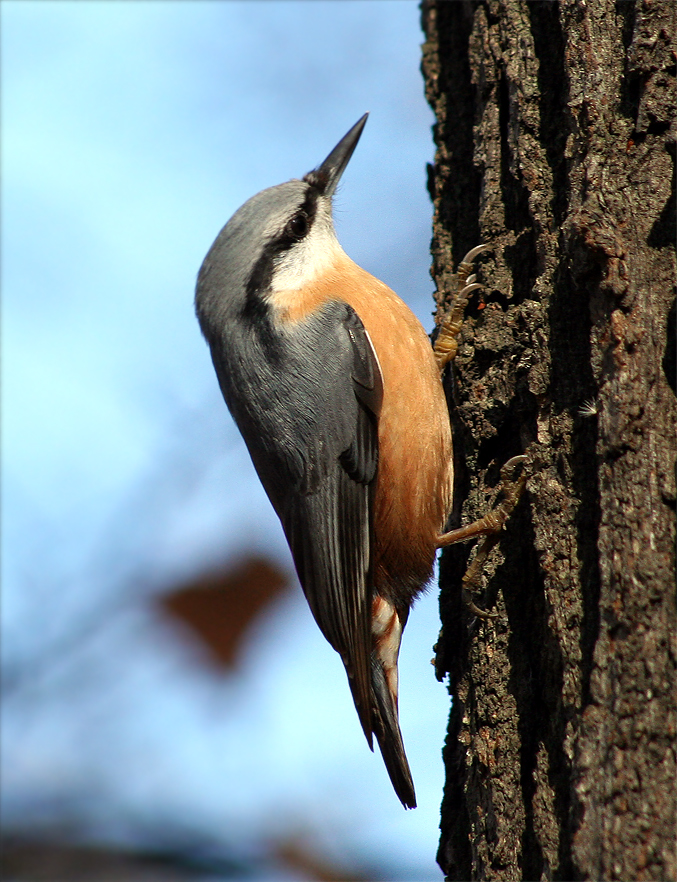
The Eurasian nuthatch has a stripe joining the beak, eye, and body

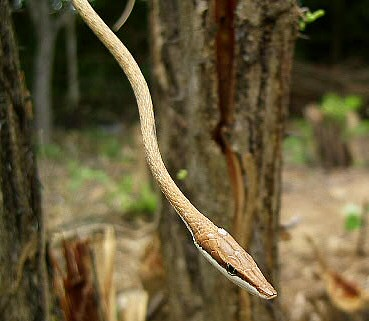
The Mexican vine snake has a dark, strongly contrasting eyestripe to conceal the eye.

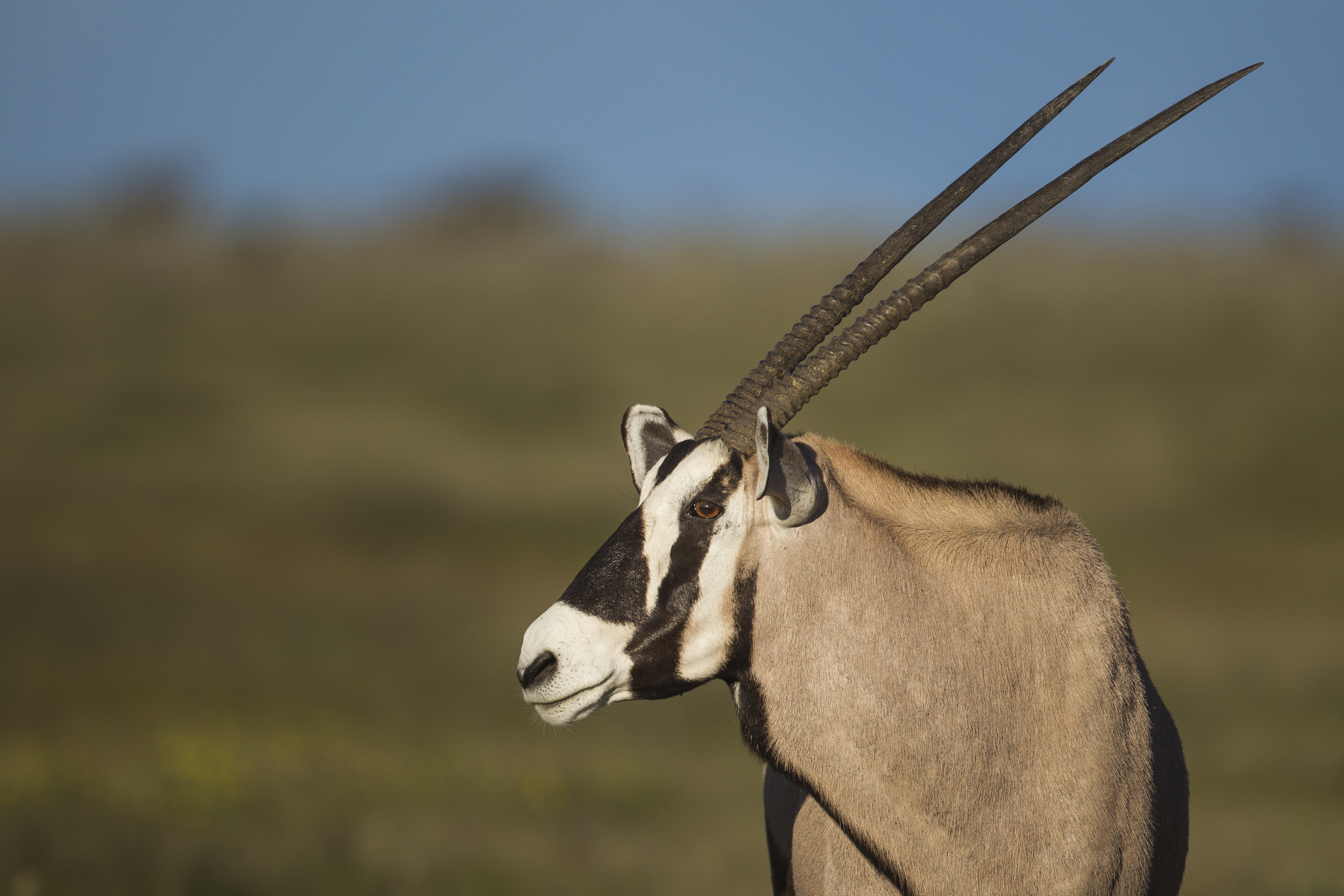
Gemsbok has a disruptive facial mask that obscures the eye.

== Bibliography ==
- Caro, Tim (2005). Antipredator Defenses in Birds and Mammals. University of Chicago Press.
- Cott, Hugh B. (1940). Adaptive Coloration in Animals. Oxford University Press.
- Thayer, Abbott Handerson (1909). Concealing-Coloration in the Animal Kingdom. Macmillan.
