= Hugh B. Cott =

English zoologist and camouflage expert (1900–1987)

- Formal portrait, probably in 1945 when he became a fellow of Selwyn College. Courtesy of Selwyn College, Cambridge
- Born: Hugh Bamford Cott; 6 July 1900; Ashby Magna, Leicestershire, England
- Died: 18 April 1987 (aged 86); Stoke Abbott, Dorset, England
- Education: Selwyn College, Cambridge; University of Glasgow
- Known for: Camouflage, Countershading
- Spouse: Joyce Radford
- Children: 1
- Scientific career
- Fields: Zoology
- Workplaces: Selwyn College, Cambridge
- Thesis: The Problem of Adaptive Coloration with Special Reference to the Anura (1938)
- Doctoral advisor: John Graham Kerr

Hugh Bamford Cott (6 July 1900 – 18 April 1987) was a British zoologist, an authority on both natural and military camouflage, and a scientific illustrator and photographer. Many of his field studies took place in Africa, where he was especially interested in the Nile crocodile, the evolution of pattern and colour in animals. During the Second World War, Cott worked as a camouflage expert for the British Army and helped to influence War Office policy on camouflage. His book Adaptive Coloration in Animals (1940), popular among serving soldiers, was the major textbook on camouflage in zoology of the twentieth century. After the war, he became a Fellow of Selwyn College, Cambridge. As a Fellow of the Zoological Society of London, he undertook expeditions to Africa and the Amazon to collect specimens, mainly reptiles and amphibians.

== Life and career ==
Cott was born in Ashby Magna, Leicestershire, England, on 6 July 1900; his father was the rector there. He was schooled at Rugby. In 1919, he graduated from the Royal Military College, Sandhurst, and was commissioned into the Leicestershire Regiment. Between 1922 and 1925, he studied at Selwyn College, Cambridge.

He had intended to become a priest, and went to Cambridge to read theology, but after his first year he went on the university expedition to South America, where he studied natural forms in eastern Brazil in 1923, led by the entomologist Frank Balfour Browne, where he became fascinated by natural history, and changed his studies to zoology on his return. He then went on an expedition to the lower Amazon (1925–1926), and on research trips to the Zambesi river area in Africa (1927), including Mozambique, Zambia and East Africa, and Lanzarote (1930). He married Joyce Radford in 1928. He was a lecturer in zoology at Bristol University from 1928 until 1932, when he moved to Glasgow University. He studied under another advocate of military camouflage, John Graham Kerr. His thesis, which he completed in 1935 under a Carnegie Fellowship, was on 'adaptive coloration' – both camouflage and warning coloration – in the Anura (frogs). In 1938 he was made a Doctor of Science at Glasgow, and he became a Zoology lecturer at Cambridge University and Strickland Curator of Birds at the university's Museum of Zoology.

Cott served in the Leicestershire Regiment of the British Army as a camouflage expert from 1919 to 1922, and, during the Second World War, with the Royal Engineers as a camouflage instructor from 1939 to 1945. Cott was chief instructor at the Camouflage Development and Training Centre at Helwan, Egypt, under filmmaker Geoffrey Barkas from its inception in November 1941.

After the war, Cott returned to Cambridge, becoming a Fellow of Selwyn College in 1945; he worked there until he retired in 1967. He gave the Fison Memorial Lecture of 1958 on 'Protective Coloration in Animals'. He continued to work from time to time after his retirement, for instance conducting a survey of crocodile nests on the Victoria Nile for the Uganda National Parks in 1972. He died at the age of 86 on 18 April 1987.

== Camouflage ==
Disruptive coloration by Hugh Cott, from Adaptive Coloration in Animals (1940)

While trying to photograph a hen partridge on her nest, Cott waited for hours for the bird to return, finally taking some pictures of the empty nest before giving up. On developing the photographs, he realized the bird had been there all along, perfectly camouflaged.

As a camouflage expert during the Second World War, Cott likened the functions of military camouflage to those of protective coloration in nature. The three main categories of coloration in his book Adaptive Coloration in Animals are concealment, disguise, and advertisement. He studied, described and presented examples of such diverse camouflage effects as obliterative shading, disruption, differential blending, high contrast, coincident disruption, concealment of the eye, contour obliteration, shadow elimination, and mimicry. In his wartime lectures at Farnham Castle, he described nine categories of visual deception:

1. merging, e.g. hare, polar bear
2. disruption, e.g. ringed plover
3. disguise, e.g. stick insect
4. mis-direction, e.g. butterfly and fish eyespots
5. dazzle, e.g. some grasshoppers
6. decoy, e.g. angler fish
7. smokescreen, e.g. cuttlefish
8. the dummy, e.g. flies, ants
9. false display of strength, e.g. toads, lizards

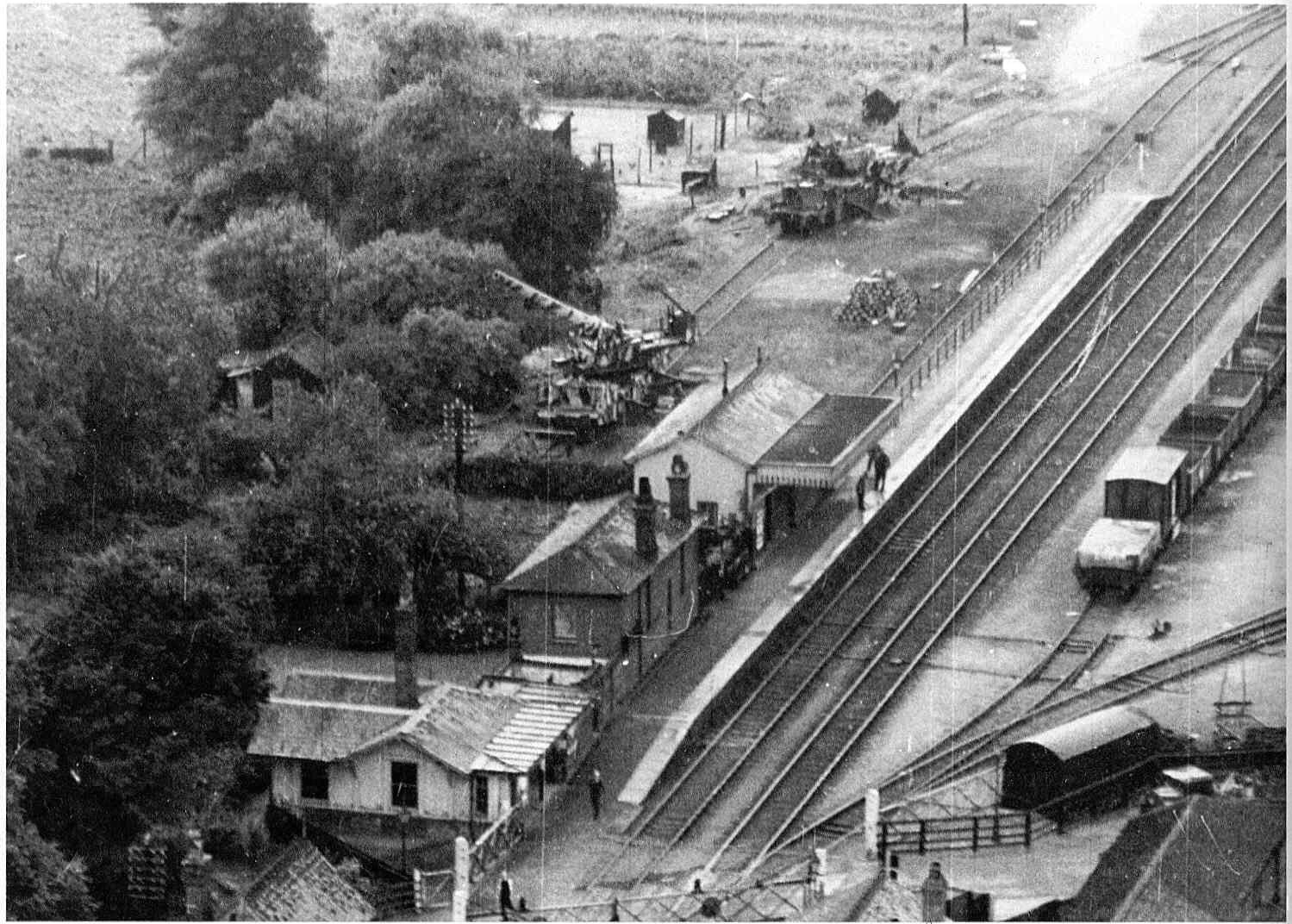
Two rail-mounted guns are shown in the photograph. A countershaded one camouflaged by Hugh Cott (above) and one in conventional style (below), August 1940

Cott's account of all this (illustrated by his own pen and ink drawings) is the 550-page book Adaptive Coloration in Animals (1940). It was proof-read by Kerr, who commented on its publication 'It is by far the finest thing of the kind in existence'. His co-workers' first-hand accounts of his work in military camouflage can be found in the memoirs of two of his fellow camoufleurs: Julian Trevelyan and Roland Penrose.

Peter Forbes wrote of Cott's book:

Cott's Adaptive Coloration in Animals must be the only compendious zoology tract ever to be packed in a soldier's kitbag. The book also marks the apotheosis of the descriptive natural history phase of mimicry studies. Although Cott does report experiments on predation to test the efficacy of mimicry and camouflage, the book is essentially a narrative of examples plus theory.

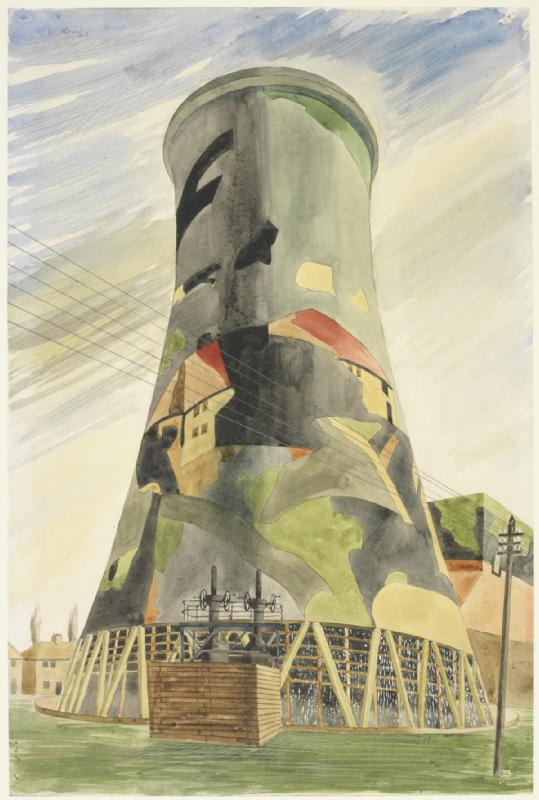
Cott was critical of attempts at camouflage not based on "vigorous disruptive contrasts". 1943 painting by Colin Moss of a cooling tower camouflaged with a landscape scene

The book was written as war loomed, and published in wartime. Cott makes use of his knowledge of natural history to draw parallels between survival in nature and in war, and to advise on military camouflage, for example commenting:

Various recent attempts to camouflage tanks, armoured cars, and the roofs of buildings with paint reveal an almost complete failure by those responsible to grasp the essential factor in the disguise of surface continuity and contour … in nature vigorous disruptive contrasts are frequently seen at work, and their wonderful effectiveness in hindering recognition needs to be experienced in the field to be fully appreciated.

Forbes notes that Adaptive Coloration in Animals is a narrative, short on the experimentation that followed after the war, but Forbes continues:

But Cott's book is still valuable today for its enormous range, for its passionate exposition of the theories of mimicry and camouflage.

Cott attempted to persuade the British army to use more effective camouflage techniques, including countershading. For example, in August 1940, with the Battle of Britain imminent, he painted two rail-mounted coastal guns, one in conventional style, one countershaded. In aerial photographs, the countershaded gun is essentially invisible. Cott was triumphant, announcing:

These photographs furnish most convincing proof of the effectiveness of countershading, and are especially valuable in that we have in them a direct comparison between the two methods.

However (like Kerr before him in the First World War), Cott did not succeed in influencing policy on camouflage, and he resigned from the Camouflage Advisory Panel in 1940.

== Artwork ==
Art with a purpose: Cott's invisible potoo, disruptively patterned

Cott was a founding member of the Society of Wildlife Artists, and a fellow of the Royal Photographic Society. From material gathered in field expeditions, he made contributions to the Cambridge University zoological museum.

Cott possessed considerable artistic skill. Like Abbott Thayer, he used his artistry in his scientific work, including in Adaptive Coloration in Animals, to help argue the case he was making. For example, his black-and-white potoo shows this rainforest bird sitting motionless on a mottled tree trunk, its behaviour and disruptive pattern combining to provide effective camouflage. The philosopher and jazz musician David Rothenberg wrote of Cott's art:

Back to Hugh Cott's marvelous engraving of a potoo hidden in a black and white Costa Rican forest, frozen vertically like the tree trunk on which it hides. In nature the visible and invisible dance back and forth with each other, depending on how much we have learned to see. The science and art of this magic merge into one at the moment we grasp it.

== Writings ==
In addition to Adaptive Coloration in Animals, Cott wrote two essays on camouflage: “Camouflage in nature and in war” and ”Animal form in relation to appearance”. As a scientific illustrator and photographer, he also wrote three other books: Zoological photography in practice (1956); Uganda in black and white (1959); and Looking at animals: a zoologist in Africa (1975). He became interested in the relationship of bird colours with their role as warning colours, an idea that arose when he observed hornets attracted to some birds being skinned while ignoring others. This led him to study the palatability of birds and their eggs. Among his papers were several studies on the relative palatibility of the eggs based initially on the preferences of ferrets, rats and hedgehogs and later on the use of a panel of expert egg tasters. In one study he found that of 123 species of bird, the kittiwake eggs scored highly with 8.2 out of 10.

== Legacy ==
Forbes praised Cott's balance of science and artistry:

..in the conflict between artists and biologists, he was both. Cott was a competent illustrator as well as a biologist. Without having Nabokov's precisianism and anti-Darwinism, he brought an artistic sensibility to bear on these phenomena. His text is radiant with the wonder of these adaptations.

Over 60 years after its publication, Adaptive Coloration in Animals remains a core reference on the subject; the evolutionary biologists Graeme Ruxton, Thomas N. Sherratt and Michael Speed conclude their book on animal coloration by writing

The study of animal coloration and associated anti-predator adaptations has a long history... this field of research has been blessed from the earliest years with the insights of particularly gifted scientists. The writings of Wallace, Bates, Müller, Poulton and Cott truly stand up to the test of time: these individuals deserve even better renown not just as great natural historians but as exceptional scientists too.

The biologist Steven Vogel commented that:

The zoologist Hugh Cott had the final word in Adaptive Coloration in Animals (1940), a definitive synthesis of everything known about camouflage and mimicry in nature. Cott ruffled fewer feathers [than Trofim Lysenko or Vladimir Nabokov], and his well-organized and unfanatic ideas proved militarily effective, even under the scrutiny of improved techniques for target detection. Thayer’s principles reemerged in more temperate and rational terms, and camouflage schemes based on them survived both photometric analyses and enemy encounters. Biomimetic camouflage took its place as yet another technique in a sophisticated armamentarium of visual deceptions.

An exhibition of his art, writing, and photographs, 'Life, Lines & Illusion', was held at the Nature in Art gallery in Gloucester in September and October 2018.

== Bibliography ==
=== By Cott ===
Books

- Cott, Hugh B. (1940). Adaptive Coloration in Animals. Methuen.
- ————— (1975). Looking at Animals: a Zoologist in Africa. Scribner.
- ————— (1959). Uganda in Black and White. Macmillan.
- ————— (1956). Zoological Photography in Practice. Fountain Press.

Journals

- Cott, Hugh B. (1936). "The effectiveness of protective adaptations in the Hive-Bee, illustrated by experiments on the feeding reactions, habit formation, and memory of the common toad (Bufo bufo bufo)". Proceedings of the Zoological Society of London. 106 (1): 111–133. doi:10.1111/j.1096-3642.1936.tb02283.x.
- ————— (1951). "The Palatability of the Eggs of Birds: Illustrated by Experiments on the Food Preferences of the Hedgehog (Erinaceus europaeus)". Proceedings of the Zoological Society of London. 121 (1): 1–41. doi:10.1111/j.1096-3642.1951.tb00726.x.
- ————— (1952). "The palatability of the eggs of birds: illustrated by three seasons' experiments (1947, 1948 and 1950) on the food preferences of the Rat (Rattus norvegicus); and with special reference to the protective adaptations of eggs considered in relation to vulnerability". Proceedings of the Zoological Society of London. 122 (1): 1–54. doi:10.1111/j.1469-7998.1952.tb06312.x.
- ————— (1953). "The palatability of the eggs of birds: illustrated by experiments on the food preferences of the Ferret (Putorius furo) and Cat (Felis catus); with notes on other egg-eating Carnivora". Proceedings of the Zoological Society of London. 123 (1): 123–141. doi:10.1111/j.1096-3642.1953.tb00160.x.
- ————— (1938). Wonder Island of the Amazon Delta; on Marajo Cowboys Ride Oxen, Tree-Dwelling Animals Throng Dense Forests. National Geographic Magazine.

=== About Cott ===
- Forbes, Peter (2009). Dazzled and Deceived: Mimicry and Camouflage. Yale. ISBN 978-0-300-12539-9.
- Forsyth, Isla McLean (2012). From dazzle to the desert: a cultural-historical geography of camouflage (PhD). University of Glasgow (PhD thesis).
- Forsyth, Isla (2014). "The practice and poetics of fieldwork: Hugh Cott and the study of camouflage" (PDF). Journal of Historical Geography. 43: 128–137. doi:10.1016/j.jhg.2013.10.002. Archived from the original (PDF) on 9 January 2020.
- Penrose, Roland (1981). Scrapbook 1900–1981. Thames and Hudson.
- Ruxton, G. D.; Sherratt, T. N.; Speed, M. P (2004). Avoiding Attack. The Evolutionary Ecology of Crypsis, Warning Signals and Mimicry. Oxford University Press. ISBN 0-19-852860-4.
- Trevelyan, Julian (1957). Indigo days. MacGibbon and Kee.
