= Stevenson Memorial =

1903 painting by Abbott Handerson Thayer

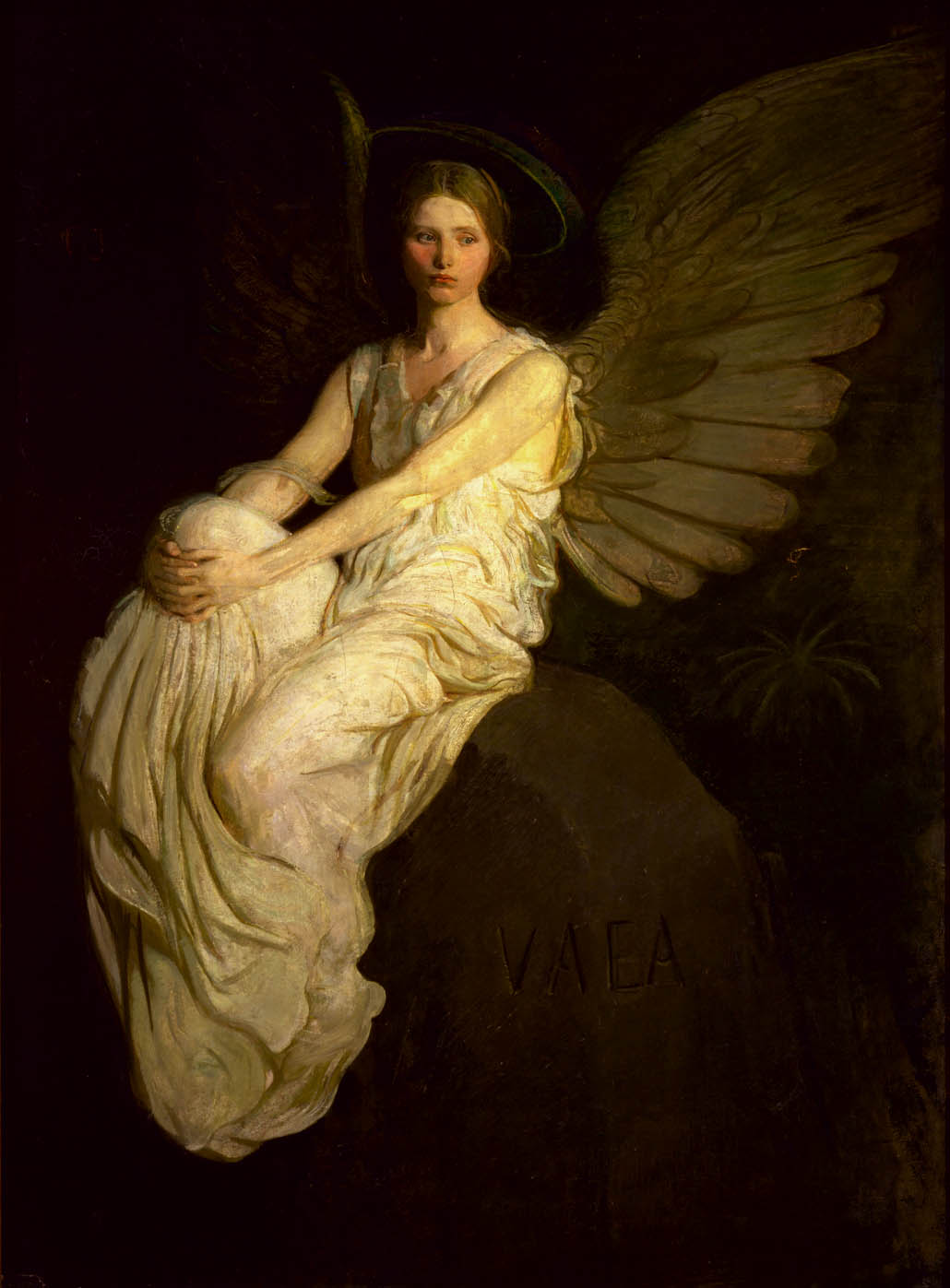
- Artist: Abbott Handerson Thayer
- Year: 1903
- Medium: Oil on canvas
- Dimensions: 207.2 cm × 152.6 cm (81.6 in × 60.1 in)
- Location: Smithsonian American Art Museum; Washington, D.C.

Stevenson Memorial is a 1903 oil painting by the American artist Abbott Handerson Thayer, intended to commemorate the writer Robert Louis Stevenson. Though Thayer initiated several paintings with the intent of honoring Stevenson, Stevenson Memorial is the only version to survive the artist's revisions.

== Description ==
Abbott Thayer was moved by the writing of Robert Louis Stevenson, whose dramatic characterizations of human conflict resonated with the artist. Thayer painted Stevenson Memorial in his studio in Dublin, New Hampshire. The painting features a young woman clothed in a classical white gown, embellished with wings and a halo. The rock that she sits upon bears the word VAEA, and in the darkness behind her is a small palm tree. VAEA refers to a mountain in the Samoan Islands, atop which Stevenson was buried after his death in 1894. Although he later painted over them, originally Thayer inscribed Stevenson's name and coat of arms across the top of the canvas. After its completion the painting was exhibited in museums across the country, to popular and critical acclaim.

== Related works and working methods ==
It was Thayer's intent that an earlier painting, My Children (Mary, Gerald and Gladys Thayer), completed in 1897, would serve as memorial to the author. In that work his daughter Mary had initially been painted holding a plaque with Stevenson's monogram, but Thayer transformed the plaque into a laurel wreath and dedicated the work to his children after being told that the painting's connection to Stevenson was not clear. The winged figure of Stevenson Memorial was painted over an earlier work, also a portrait of his three children; it, too, was envisioned as a tribute to Stevenson.

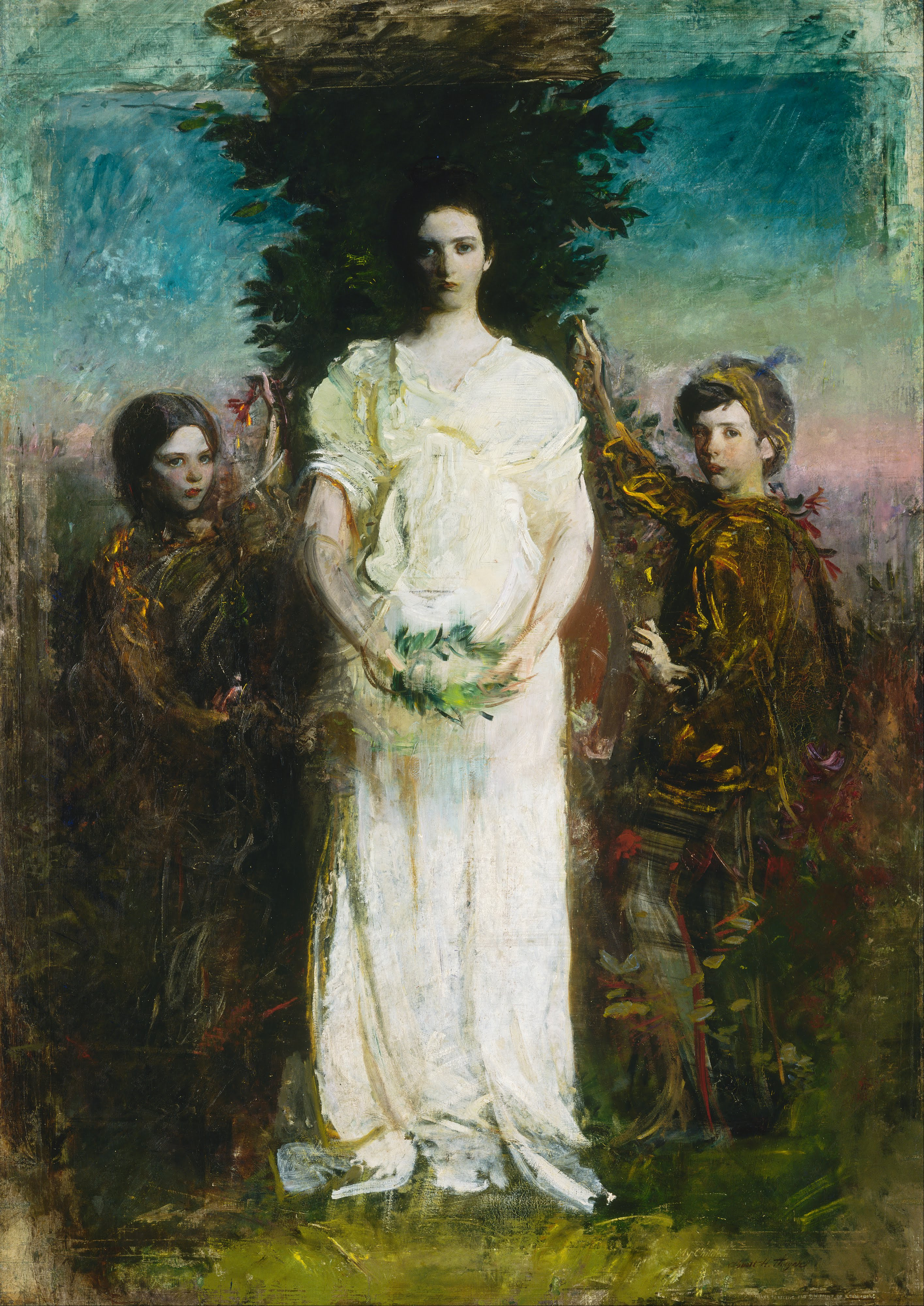
Abbott Thayer. My Children (Mary, Gerald and Gladys Thayer), 1897. Smithsonian American Art Museum. This painting of his children was originally intended as Thayer's tribute to Stevenson.

Thayer's working methods were unconventional. According to Rockwell Kent, who at that time worked as an apprentice and copyist in Thayer's studio, Thayer was displeased with the appearance of the rock upon which the figure was seated, and asked for the younger artist's opinion:

With not too much conviction I offered my criticism. "Good!" said Thayer. "Now I'll go out. You take my brushes and paint the rock the way you think it ought to be. And call me when you've finished."....So I went to work. And when I had done the best I could, I called Thayer back. Thayer was generous. "Yes," he cried, "I think you've helped it." Suddenly he cried, "Look! We're both wrong—building it up little by little like that! God said, 'let there be a rock'—and there it was." And picking up a broom he swept it right and left across the painting. It did the trick.

A later painting, Winged Figure Seated upon a Rock (Freer Gallery of Art), was another canvas begun as an alternative conception of the Stevenson Memorial, but was not completed until years later. In 1914 Thayer transformed it into a memorial for his late wife, with his daughter Gladys posing for the figure and a Latin inscription translated as "Mother of my daughter! To you this monument" painted below.

The model for Stevenson Memorial was Bessie Price, a guest of the Thayer household that caught the attention of Mr.Thayer. She had just traveled from Ireland to visit her siblings who worked in the household and decided to stay in America to be Thayer's servant. She had previously posed for other paintings by the artist, including Portrait of Bessie Price, Young Woman (Metropolitan Museum of Art), and Seated Angel (Wadsworth Atheneum).

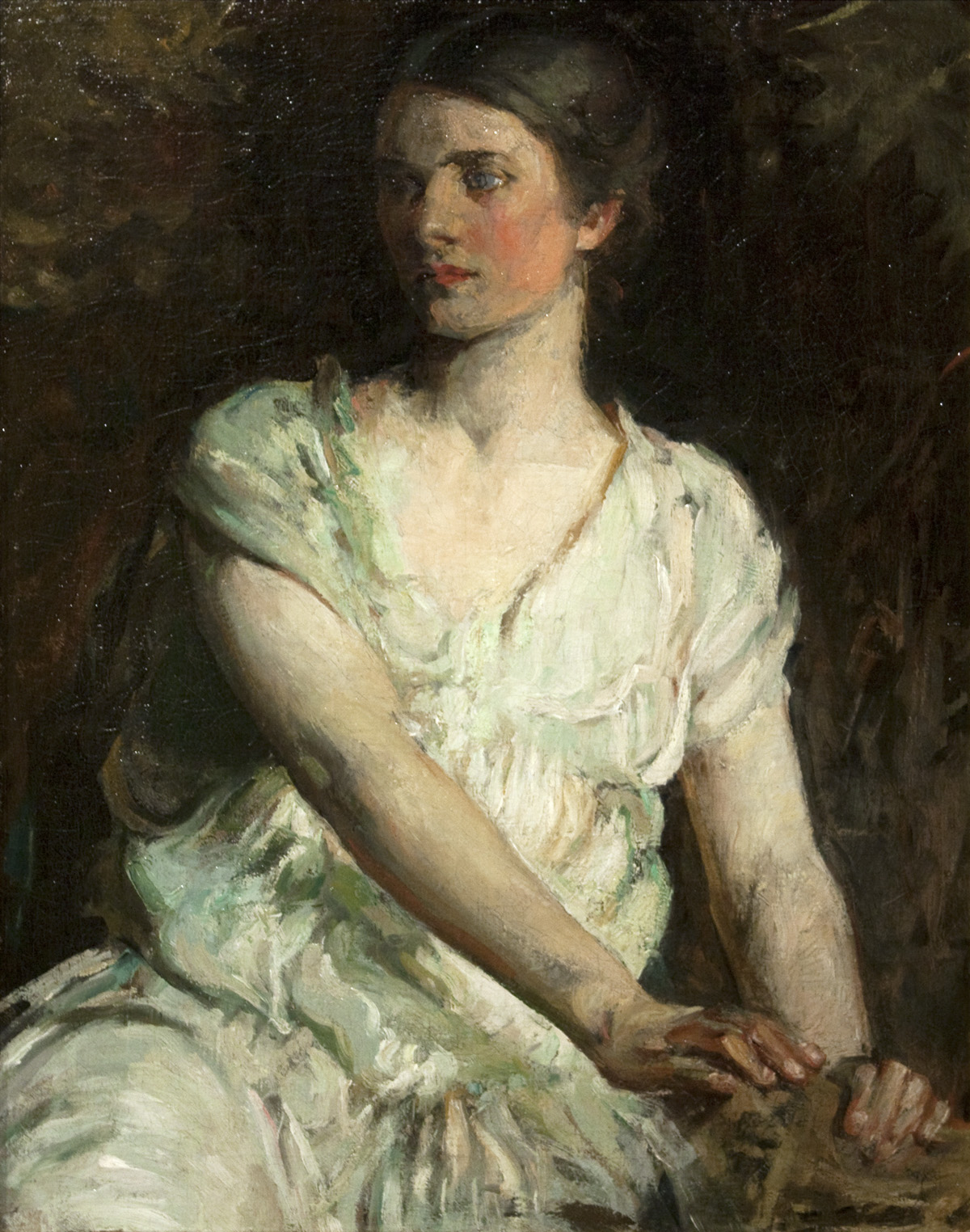
Abbott Thayer. Young Woman (Bessie Price), circa 1897–1898. Oil on canvas, 25 1/2 × 19 5/8 inches. Hunter Museum of American Art. Another figure for which Bessie Price posed, closely related to Young Woman in the Metropolitan Museum of Art.

== Interpretation ==
Although Thayer never discussed the meaning of his angelic figures like the one in Stevenson Memorial, in 1912 he offered a general explanation: "Doubtless my lifelong passion for birds has helped to incline me to work wings into my pictures; but primarily I have put on wings probably more to symbolize an exalted atmosphere (above the realm of genre painting) where one need not explain the action of the figures".

From the 1890s on many of the winged figures painted by Thayer are thought to have expressed the artist's contemplations on grief, and to represent his beliefs on the relationship between body and spirit, but it is also said that the artist painted his models the way that he saw their soul and had a deep connection with each model.

According to museum curator Richard Murray, Stevenson Memorial allowed Thayer to meld his own concepts of "the polar extremes of darkness and light symbolizing the coexistence of madness and sanity and good and evil" with similar themes from Stevenson's writing.
