= Concealing-Coloration in the Animal Kingdom =

Book by Abbott Handerson Thayer

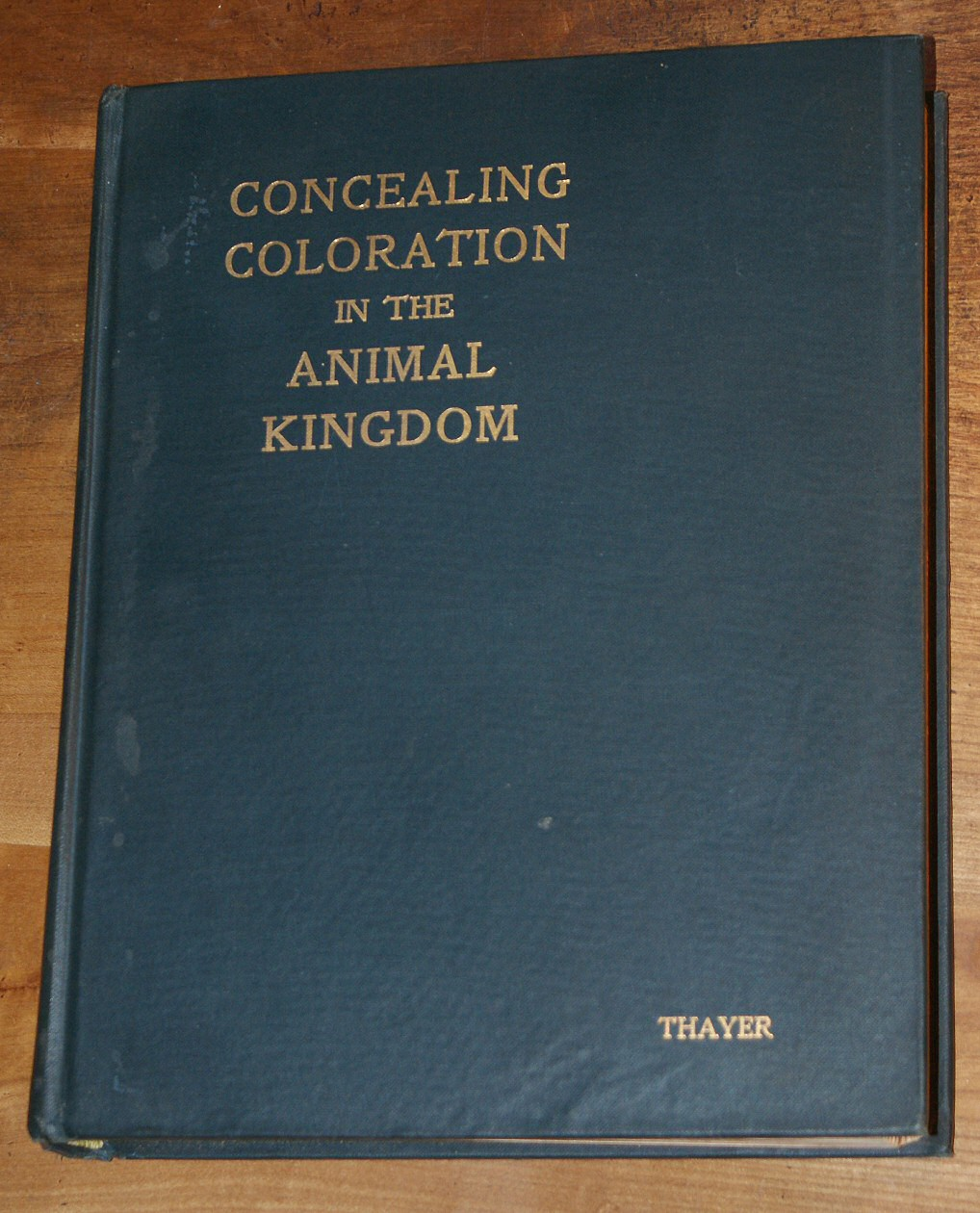
- Cover of first edition
- Author: Gerald H. Thayer
- Illustrator: Abbott Handerson Thayer; Richard S. Meryman
- Subject: Camouflage
- Genre: Natural history
- Publisher: Macmillan
- Publication date: 1909
- Publication place: US

Concealing-Coloration in the Animal Kingdom: An Exposition of the Laws of Disguise Through Color and Pattern; Being a Summary of Abbott H. Thayer's Discoveries is a book published ostensibly by Gerald H. Thayer in 1909, and revised in 1918, but in fact a collaboration with and completion of his father Abbott Handerson Thayer's major work.

The book, illustrated artistically by Abbott Thayer, sets out the controversial thesis that all animal coloration has the evolutionary purpose of camouflage. Thayer rejected Charles Darwin's theory of sexual selection, arguing in words and paintings that even such conspicuous animal features as the peacock's tail or the brilliant pink of flamingoes or roseate spoonbills were effective as camouflage in the right light.

The book introduced the concepts of disruptive coloration to break up an object's outlines, of masquerade, as when a butterfly mimics a leaf, and especially of countershading, where an animal's tones make it appear flat by concealing its self-shadowing.

The book was criticised by big game hunter and politician Theodore Roosevelt for its central assertion that every aspect of animal coloration is effective as camouflage. Roosevelt's detailed reply attacked the biased choice of examples to suit Abbott Thayer's thesis and the book's reliance on unsubstantiated claims in place of evidence. The book was more evenly criticised by zoologist and camouflage researcher Hugh Cott, who valued Thayer's work on countershading but regretted his overenthusiastic attempts to explain all animal coloration as camouflage. Thayer was mocked to a greater or lesser extent by other scientific reviewers.

== Overview ==
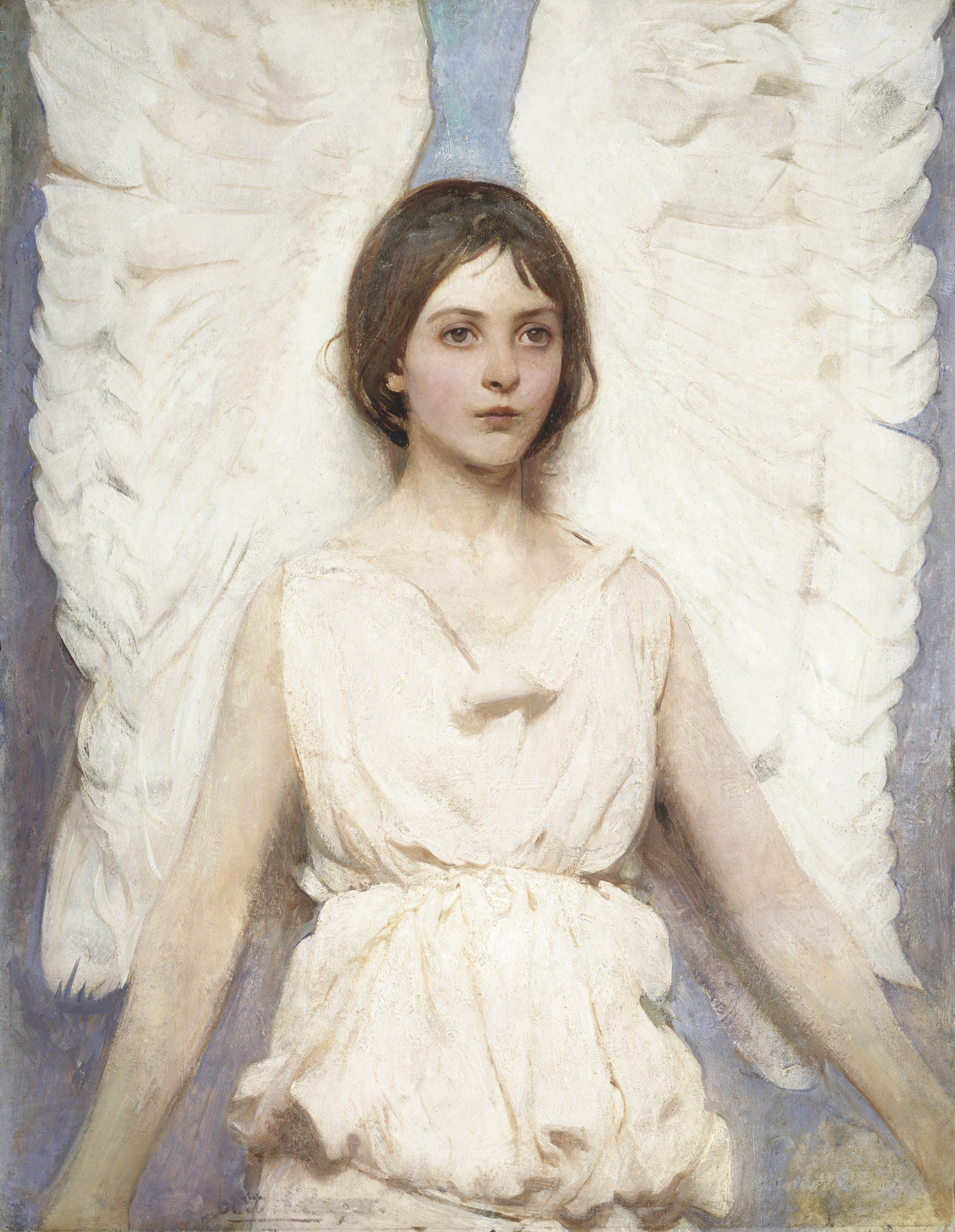
Angel, oil painting by Abbott Thayer, 1887

Abbott Thayer (1849–1921) was an American artist, known for his figure paintings, often of "virginal, spiritual beauty", which were sometimes, as in his most famous painting, Angel, modeled on his children. He had studied at an art school in Paris, but unlike James McNeill Whistler he returned to the United States. Along with seeking timeless beauty, Thayer also became obsessed with nature, which he felt contained the pure beauty that he was seeking to capture in his paintings.

Thayer's close observation led him to notice what scientists such as Edward Bagnall Poulton were just beginning to describe. This was that many animals were "painted" the opposite way to how painters create the appearance of solidity in figures. A canvas is flat, and areas of uniform color painted on a canvas also appear flat. To make a body appear to have depth and solidity, the artist paints in shadows on the body itself. The top of an animal's back, facing the sky, remains bright, while it must become darker towards its underside. Thayer was excited to realize that by reversing such shading, nature could and did make animals appear flat. He was so passionate about this "concealing coloration" theory that he called it his "second child". Poulton had noticed countershading in certain caterpillars, but he had not realized that the phenomenon was widespread, and he championed Thayer's theory in a 1902 article in Nature.

However, Thayer was not a scientist, and he lacked a scientist's inclination to attempt to test and disprove every aspect of a new theory. Instead, Thayer came to believe that the theory belonged to artists, with their trained perception: "The whole basis of picture making consists in contrasting against its background every object in the picture", he argued.

The obsession led him to deny that animals could be colored for other reasons: for protection by mimicry, as the naturalist Henry Walter Bates had proposed, supported by many examples of butterflies from South America; through sexual selection, as Charles Darwin had argued, again supported by many observations. The unbalanced treatment of animal coloration in Concealing-Coloration in the Animal Kingdom encapsulates Thayer's partial understanding and his rejection of other theories.

The same obsession led him, later, to attempt to persuade the military to adopt camouflage based on his ideas, traveling to London in 1915, and writing "passionate letters" to the Assistant Secretary to the US Navy, Franklin Delano Roosevelt, in 1917.

== Approach ==
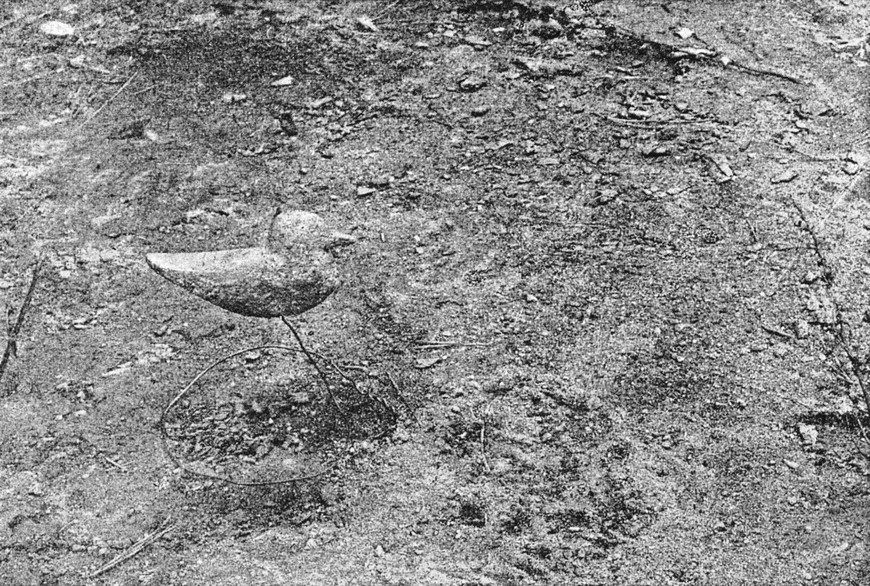
Abbott Thayer introduced the concept of Countershading in the book

=== Text ===
Gerald Thayer describes the book as having two main purposes: to present Abbott Thayer's research to naturalists; and to make the subject available to a wider readership. (Note: Thayer, 1909. p viii.)

The book's list of contents reveals Thayer's heavy reliance on bird examples, filling 16 of the 27 chapters. Other vertebrates occupy 5 chapters. Insects receive 3 chapters, of which two are dedicated to lepidoptera - one to caterpillars, one to adult butterflies and moths; the remaining one devotes 14 pages to all other insects, starting with orthoptera including the leaf-mimic grasshoppers.

=== Illustrations ===
The book has 16 colored plates of paintings by Abbott Thayer and Richard S. Meryman, including the well known frontispiece "Peacock amid foliage", and the heavily criticised images of wood ducks, blue jays against snow, roseate spoonbills and flamingoes "at dawn or sunset, and the skies they picture". The last 4 colored plates are of caterpillars. Gerald Thayer claims that "The illustrations are of particular importance, inasmuch as they include what we believe to be the first scientific paintings ever published of animals lighted as they actually are in nature".

There are 140 black and white figures, mainly photographs with a few diagrams and drawings. Half the photographs are of birds. The photographs are from various sources, "gleaned from periodicals, or secured by special advertising." (Note: Thayer, 1909. p ix.)

== Contents ==
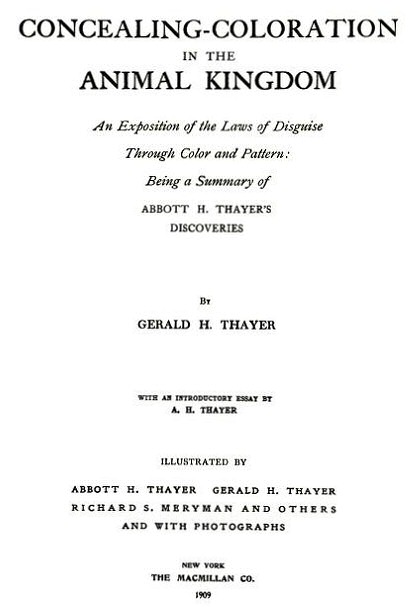
Title page of first edition

Introduction by Abbott H. Thayer. An essay on the psychological and other basic principles of the subject.

1. Outline of the book's scope. "The Law which underlies Protective Coloration"
2. Definition of terms. Obliterative Shading
3. First principles of the use of markings with obliterative shading
4. Picture-patterns, with obliterative shading, on birds. American Woodcock, and Snipe
5. Picture-patterns on obliteratively-shaded birds, continued. Terrestrial Goatsuckers
6. Picture-patterns on counter-shaded birds. Forest Grouse, Owls, European Woodcock
7. Picture-patterns on counter-shaded birds, continued. Grass-patterns, heather-patterns
8. Picture-patterns on counter-shaded birds, continued. Scansorial (climbing) birds
9. Picture-patterns on counter-shaded birds, continued. Shore-birds
10. Picture-patterns on counter-shaded birds, continued. Reed-patterns, etc., of Bitterns
11. Background-picturing on counter-shaded birds, continued. Marsh-birds. Wood Duck
12. Background-picturing on counter-shaded birds, continued. Birds of the ocean
13. Birds, etc. The inherent 'obliterative' power of markings. 'Ruptive' and 'Secant' patterns
14. Birds, etc. Special functions of markings
15. Birds. Masking of bill and feet for offensive purposes
16. Birds, etc. The manifold obliterative power of iridescence
17. Birds, etc. Appendages, and their part in 'obliteration'
18. Birds: miscellany. "Mimicry" (vs 'obliteration')
19. Birds, concluded
20. Mammals
21. Mammals, continued
22. Mammals, concluded
23. Fishes
24. Reptiles and Amphibians
25. Caterpillars
26. A glance at Insects other than Lepidoptera
27. Butterflies and Moths

== Outline ==
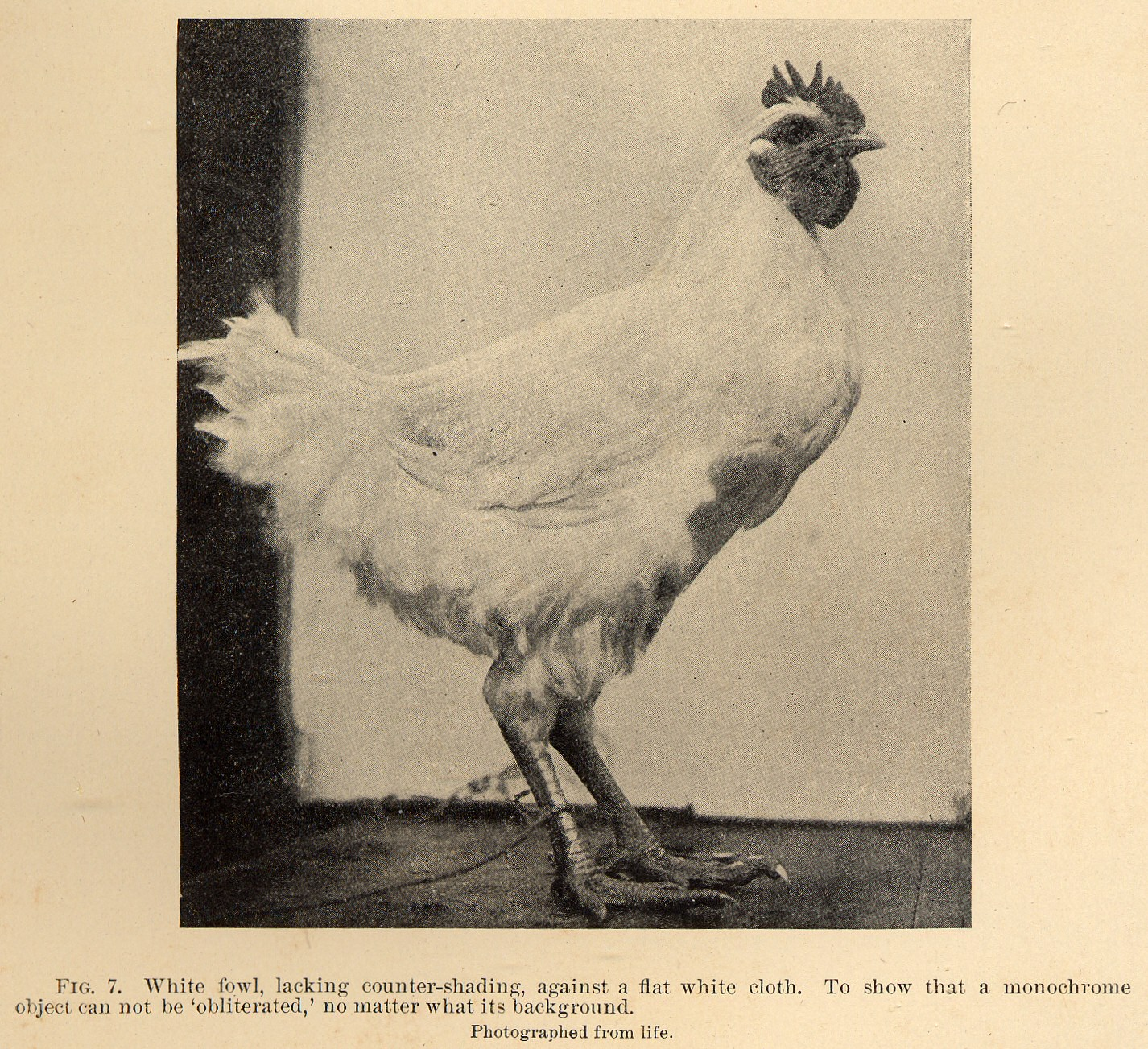
Fig. 7. "White fowl, lacking counter-shading, against a flat white cloth. To show that a monochrome object can not be 'obliterated', no matter what its background."

Chapter 1 sets out the "long-ignored laws" of "protective coloration", an act which "has waited for an artist" to perceive. Thayer explains the principle of countershading with a diagram, arguing that a naive view of being "colored like their surroundings" does not explain how animal camouflage works. He acknowledges the prior work of Edward Bagnall Poulton (The Colours of Animals, 1890) in identifying countershading in caterpillars, quoting some passages where Poulton describes how larvae and pupae can appear flat. Countershading is named as "the law which underlies protective coloration", rather than as one of several principles.

Chapter 2 defines the book's terms, equating "mimicry" with "protective resemblance", so that it becomes a form of "protective or disguising coloration". Thayer distinguishes "concealing-colors" (mainly countershading for "invisibility") from the "other" branch of protective coloration, which includes most kinds of mimicry, for "deceptive visibility". The two branches are then named "obliterative coloration" and "mimicry". Mimicry is dismissed as playing "a very insignificant part" in the "higher orders", i.e. it is limited mainly to invertebrates. A fine photograph of a "white fowl, lacking counter-shading, against a flat white cloth" demonstrates that camouflage is more than color matching. Thayer then gives several examples of what he considers countershaded animals.

Chapter 3 describes the combination of markings with countershading, with photographs of a model bird and of a woodcock, showing how in the correct position these are well camouflaged with "wonderful obliterative picture-patterns", but wrongly positioned or upside down (with a photograph of a dead woodcock) they are easily visible.

Chapters 4 and 5 illustrate more "picture-patterns" in well camouflaged birds including Wilson's snipe and whip-poor-will (nighthawks and goatsuckers, Caprimulgidae). Thayer describes these as showing "obliteration, or merging with the background" but that their patterning is close to mimicry as they "perfectly" resemble objects such as "a stone or mossy log".

Chapter 6 argues that some birds such as the ruffed grouse have patterns designed as camouflage against distant backgrounds, with a painting of a bird against a forest background as evidence. "The bird is in plain sight, but invisible". For the great horned owl, a piece of the wing is "super-imposed" on a photograph of a wood, "to show how closely the owl's patterns reproduce such a forest interior." The text describes the owl as having "a highly developed forest-vista pattern". Chapter 7 similarly argues for grass and heather patterns on "terrestrial" (as opposed to arboreal) birds. The disruptively patterned white-tailed ptarmigan is shown in "a very remarkable photograph" by Evan Lewis. Thayer attempts to classify the camouflage types, for example writing

The principal feature of the pattern made by grasses over ground is a more or less intricate lace-work of crisscrossing, light-colored, linear forms, some straight, some curled and twisted, relieving with varying intensity against dark.

— Thayer (Note: Thayer, 1909. p 46.)

Chapter 8 continues the theme with "scansorial" or tree climbing birds. Chapter 9 claims that "obliterative shading, pure and simple, is the rule among the Shore Birds" such as sandpipers and curlew. Chapter 10 describes the "background-picturing" of bitterns, birds which live in reedbeds, where

The light stripes on the bill were repeated and continued by the light stripes on the sides of the head and neck, and together they imitated very closely the look of separate, bright reed-stems; while the dark stripes pictured reeds in shadow, or the shadowed interstices between the stems.

— Thayer (Note: Thayer, 1909. p 57.)

Chapter 11 argues (in a way that was heavily criticised when the book appeared, see below) that water birds, some of them highly conspicuous like the jacana and notoriously the male wood duck, are colored for camouflage: "The beautifully contrasted black-and-white bars on the flanks of the Wood Duck (Aix sponsa) are ripple pictures, and as potent [as camouflage], in their place, as the most elaborate markings of land birds". (Note: Thayer, 1909. p 62.) Chapter 12 argues that the "pure white" of ocean birds such as gulls and terns equally functions as camouflage. Thayer admits that these often appear conspicuous, but argues that against varied backgrounds, white offers "the greatest average inconspicuousness against the ocean" (his italics) or against the bright sky when seen from below.

Chapter 13 analyses "markings and patterns in detail, starting with a color plate that shows the effect of disruptive patterning, which Thayer calls "strong 'secant' and 'ruptive' patterns". Using a photograph of an oystercatcher at its nest by Cherry and Richard Kearton, Thayer argues that the boldly marked bird (mainly black above, white below, with red beak) is both countershaded and "ruptively" patterned. Chapter 14 discusses the barred markings of hawks and owls, with further fine plates of photographs by the Keartons of disruptively patterned waders and their cryptic chicks. The ringed plover is described as having "eye-masking and 'obliterative' shadow-and-hole-picturing pattern".

Chapter 15 describes the leg feather patterns of hawks, asserting that these "pantaloons" mask these "dangerous talons" to facilitate attack, just as their beaks, like the beaks of wading birds, are masked paradoxically with "gaudy colors". Chapter 16 controversially claims that the iridescent colours of, for example, the speculum wing patch of the mallard and other ducks is "obliterative", the "brightly changeable plumage" serving to camouflage the wearer in varying conditions. Thayer asserts that such brightly colored species as the European kingfisher and the purple gallinule are camouflaged:

Iridescence should perhaps be considered second only to obliterative [counter]shading as a factor in the disguisement of birds; its universality attests its value.

— Thayer (Note: Thayer, 1909. p 95.)

Chapter 17 argues that bird plumage has "many devices" to conceal the animals' outlines. Even the "enormously developed feather-appendages" of the birds of paradise are argued to provide camouflage in this way. Sexual display is mentioned but dismissed as not being the sole reason for the colours, outlines and patterns of the male birds. Chapter 18 briefly discusses mimicry, before returning to "the evident paramount importance of the obliterative function", this time of the "brilliant, flowerlike" heads of hummingbirds. The one case that Thayer admits is mimetic is the goatsucker of Trinidad, a plant mimic that perches "by day and night" on a tree stump or branch, where the purpose of the mimicry is crypsis. Chapter 19 concludes the description of bird plumage, claiming that birds from the tropical forests to the "snowy north", including woodpeckers and the blue jay are all "colored for inconspicuousness".

Chapters 20, 21, and 22 discuss the "disguising-coloration" of mammals, including the whales which "are equipped with a full obliterative shading of surface-colors". The bats are admitted to have very little in the way of countershading, unlike all other families in the order. Thayer notes that a few species with strong defences such as hedgehogs, porcupines, echidnas, pangolins and "some armadillos" are exceptions, along with some beasts which "enjoy a like security by virtue of their gigantic bigness", including the elephants, rhinoceroses, and hippopotamuses. The domestic hare is shown to be strongly countershaded with a pair of photographs "from life", one sitting and one "laid on its back, outdoors, so that the obliterative shading is reversed". Chapter 21 asserts that zebras "must be extraordinarily inconspicuous" against vegetation, a claim derided by Theodore Roosevelt (see below). Chapter 22 addresses the problem of the "few [beasts] whose bold, clear patterns seem to defy that foremost obliterative law." These include the skunks, the African zoril (striped polecat) and the teledu (stink badger) of Java, which all have dark underparts and white upperparts. Thayer dismisses the aposematism of these species, instead asserting the effectiveness of their camouflage:

Skunks, teledus, and the rest, long believed by naturalists to be colored for warning conspicuousness (proclaimant of their foul defensive equipment), have, in fact, the universal obliterative coloration.

— Thayer (Note: Thayer, 1909. p 148.)

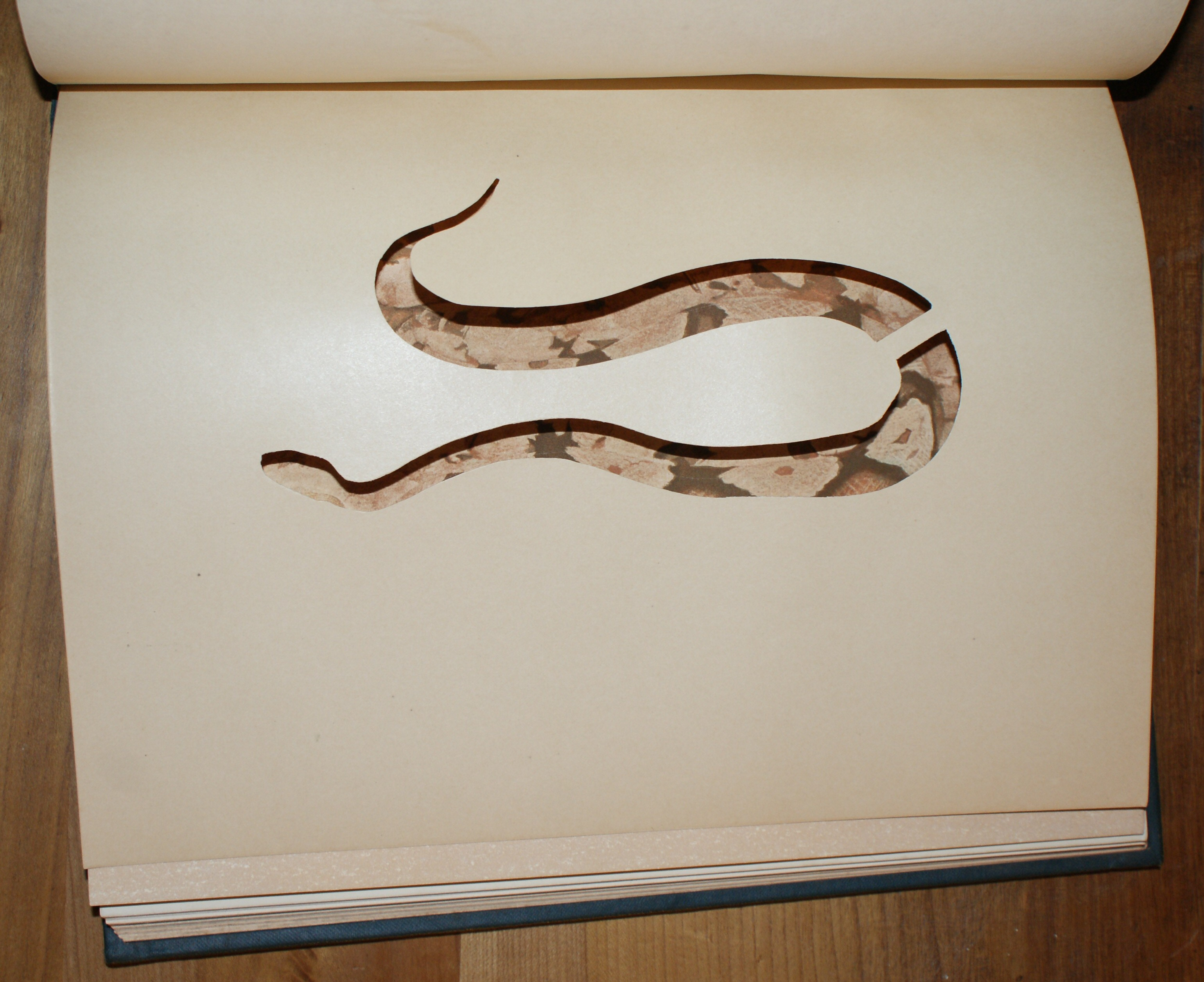
Copperhead Snake - full-page card cutout, to fit over the painting of the same snake among leaves

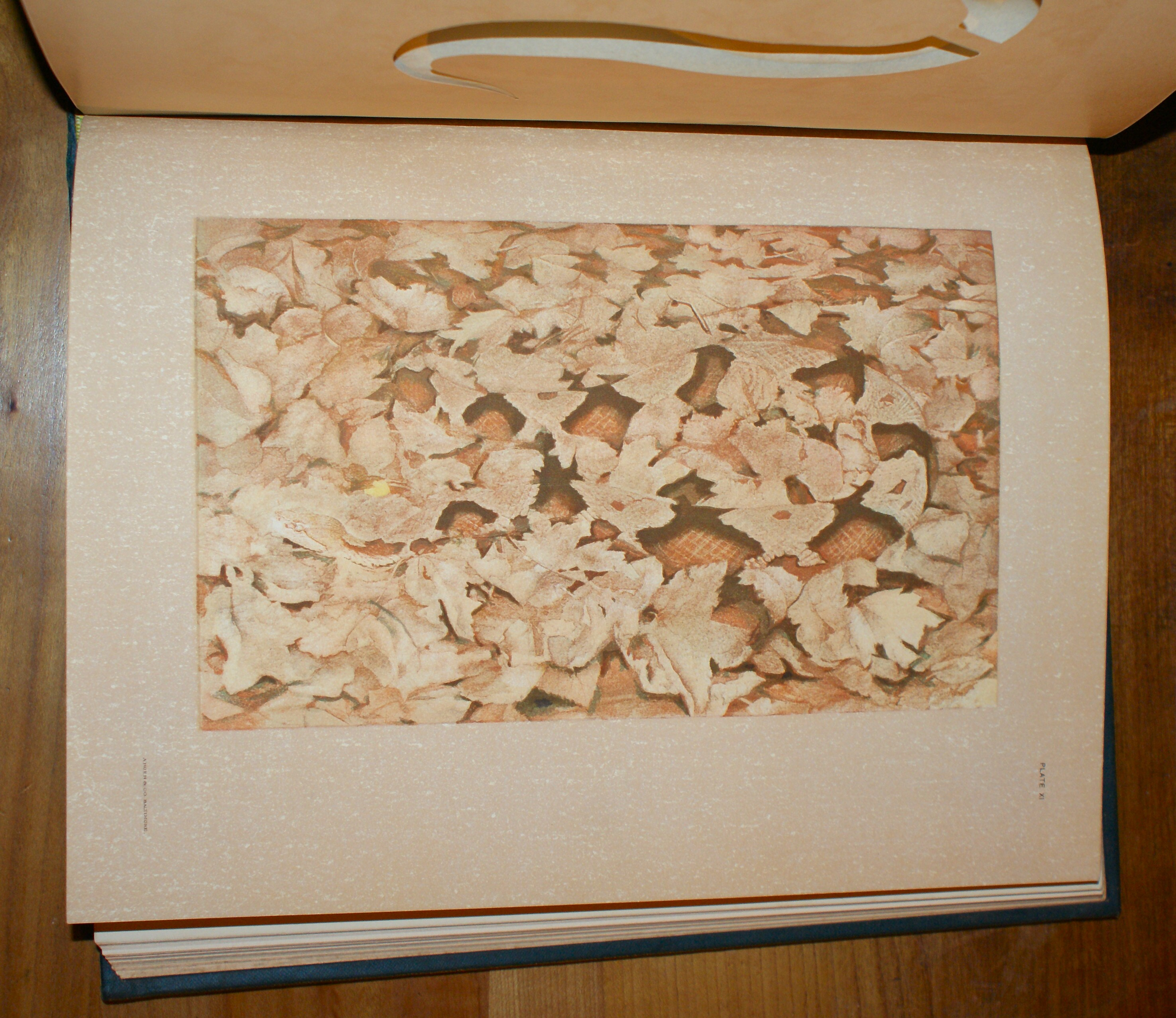
Copperhead Snake among Leaves - painting, showing effective disruptive pattern

Several photographs using stuffed skins of skunks attempt to prove the point. The chapter goes on to claim that roseate spoonbills, flamingoes, and prongbuck are all obliteratively colored. The raccoon's head resembles "the end of a hollow stump or log", while its tail is said to be "distractive", the strong banding serving like an eyespot to divert the attention of a predator to the tail rather than the head while the animal dives down a hole. But Thayer is unable to resist arguing that when "quiet, their tail-bands act obliteratively".

Chapter 23 looks at fish, admitting frankly that the authors "know next to nothing about fishes from the standpoint of systematic science", but saying that they have gathered a "trustworthy general estimate" of their "disguising coloration" from market stalls, museums and books. Many fish are countershaded. The bioluminescence of some deep sea fish and other animals is seen as a problem as it is not "obliterative"; the possibility of counterillumination camouflage is not considered.

Chapter 24 considers the reptiles and amphibians. These are noted to be predominantly green, often with "ruptive" patterns. Plate 11 treats a "Copperhead snake on dead leaves", the caption explaining that "This is a bona-fide study of a Copperhead Snake among dead leaves—its normal situation." There is a full-page sheet of card, cut out in the shape of the snake lying on a bed of leaves. When this is folded back, a painting by Rockwell Kent and Abbott Thayer "(Also G.H. Thayer and E.B. Thayer)" is revealed, showing the snake's outline powerfully disrupted by its zigzag pattern among the light and shade of the leaf litter.

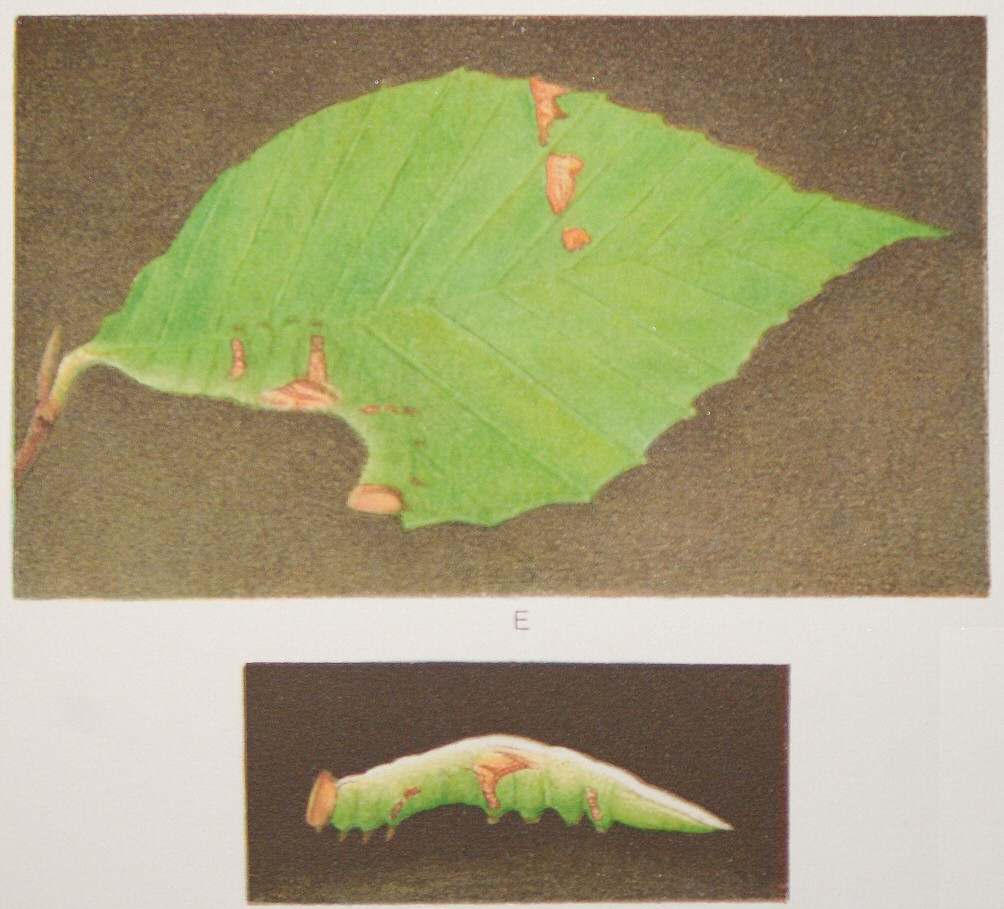
Larger-spotted beech-leaf-edge caterpillar, both on leaf and detached, the other way up, revealing strong countershading

Chapter 24 mentions that some terrestrial salamanders "are rather brightly pied with black and whitish, or yellow", while other amphibians "are extremely gaudy—wearing much bright blue, green, purple and sometimes red." It suggests that some of these markings are "baits or targets", again to distract predators from striking at the head, while the salamander markings are left as a problem as the authors "know too little about the habits" of these species. It is admitted that "the disguising coloration of many of them is very obscure."

The final chapters 25, 26 and 27 turn to the insects. Chapter 25 looks at caterpillars, with, as Poulton had earlier noted, convincing examples of countershading. Plate 13 shows caterpillars including the "larger-spotted beech-leaf-edge caterpillar" both in position "passing for a part of the leaf on which it is feeding", strongly cryptic and flattened like a slightly browning leaf, and inverted, when its countershading makes it appear conspicuously solid. Chapter 26 looks at other insects and spiders, noting the "famous leaf-mimicking Kallima inachus" butterfly of India, but again claiming that even conspicuous butterflies are in fact "obliterative". Eye-spots are mentioned, but instead of noting that these might be distractive, they are asserted to be "dazzling", appearing as holes, and thus functioning as disruptive camouflage.

The text ends with a paragraph that asks if it is "any wonder that artists should feel keen delight in looking at the disguising-patterns worn by animals?" These are "triumphs of art", where the student can find "in epitome, painted and perfected by Nature herself", the typical color and pattern scheme of each kind of landscape.

Color and pattern, line and shading,—all are true beyond the power of man to imitate, or even fully to discern.

— Thayer (Note: Thayer, 1909. p 240.)

An appendix provides extracts from a "very remarkable addition to our subject", Poulton's 1907 observations of color change in chameleons.

== Reception ==
=== Contemporary reviews ===
==== Theodore Roosevelt ====
The Thayers' views were vigorously criticised in 1911 by Theodore Roosevelt, an experienced big game hunter and naturalist familiar with animal camouflage as well as a politician, in a lengthy article in the Bulletin of the American Museum of Natural History.

Roosevelt begins by writing that the Thayers expounded the "doctrine" of concealing coloration "in its extreme form", which he thought had been "pushed to such a fantastic extreme and to include such wild absurdities as to call for the application of common sense thereto." Then, "to show the sweeping claims made", Roosevelt quotes verbatim eight passages from the book, one after the other, 500 words in all, the last one being "'All patterns and colors whatsoever of all animals that ever prey or are preyed upon are under certain normal circumstances obliterative.'"

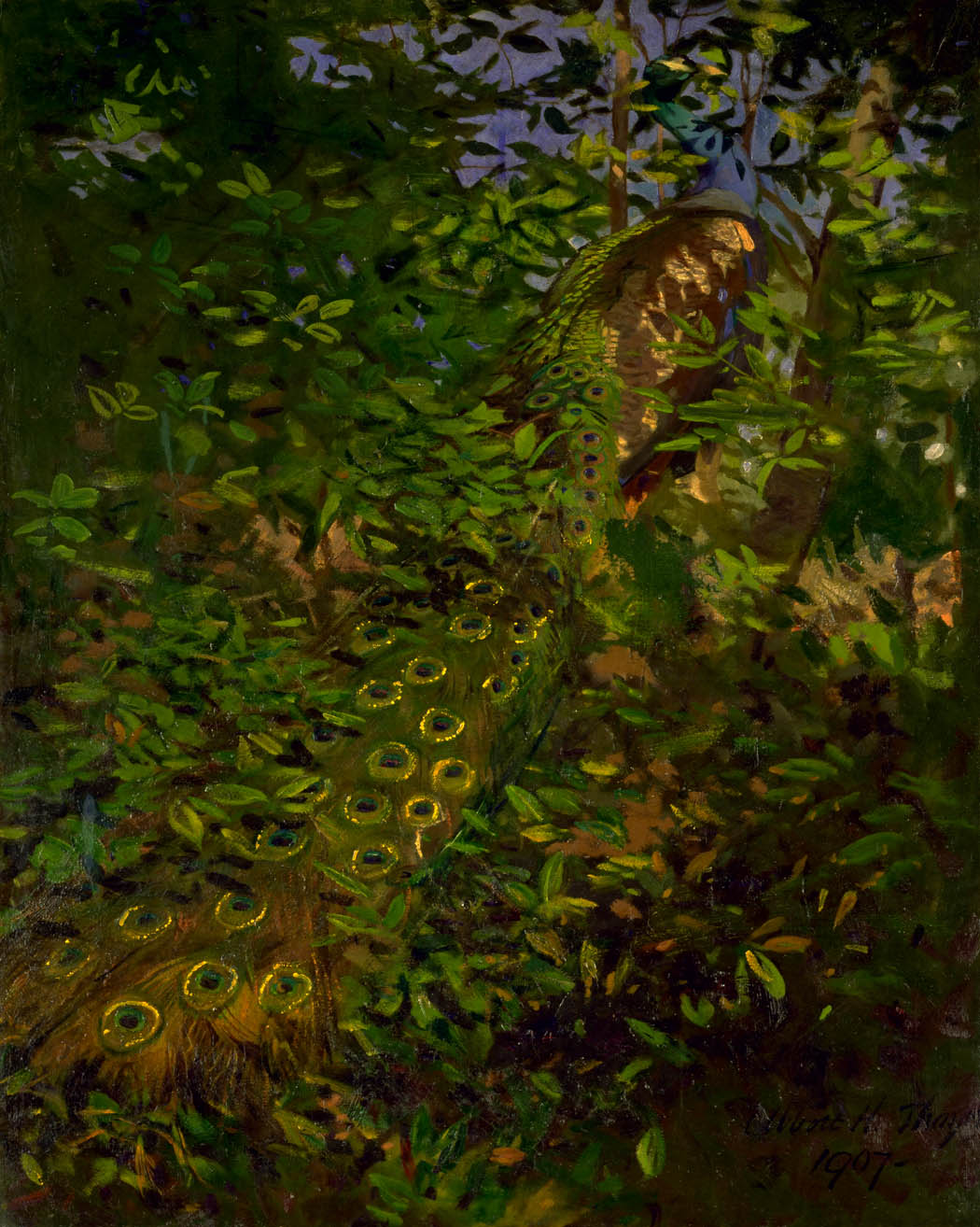
Abbott Thayer and Richard Meryman painted Peacock in the Woods for Thayer's 1909 book. The image wrongly suggests that even the male bird's brilliant plumage functions as camouflage.

He then observes that the Thayers' claims, both in "pictures" and in writing, are not so much arguments as plain "misstatements of facts, or wild guesses put forward as facts." He puts these down to enthusiasm rather than dishonesty, and as an example critiques the picture (the book's frontispiece) of the peacock in a tree

with the blue sky showing through the leaves in just sufficient quantity here and there to warrant the author-artists explaining that the wonderful blue hues of the peacock's neck are obliterative because they make it fade into the sky.

This, Roosevelt writes, would be an extremely rare sight in nature. Worse, the female (the peahen) would, he argues, be conspicuous in those conditions. The Thayers have chosen a blue sky to argue that the peacock is camouflaged; but then they choose a white sky to allow the prongbuck's white rump to fade into that background. This, Roosevelt argues, is so dishonest that an engineer who constructed a report in that way would at once be dismissed, and the directors of a corporation who "tried to float shares on the strength of such a report" would be liable to "prosecution for fraud".

Roosevelt had recently returned from his African safari, having seen, admired and shot large numbers of animals. He was scornful of Thayer's theories, which he described as "phantasmagoria", and the writer as "a well meaning and ill-balanced enthusiast". Thayer's suggestion that the white markings on the body of the harnessed bush buck are meant to resemble "flecks of water shine" is dismissed as wild, with the observation from personal experience that bush buck spend little time in watery places, while the "situtunga or lechwe, which lack the spots" spend more. Roosevelt does not refrain from harshness: he describes the camouflaged flamingo theory as "probably the wildest" of "all the wild absurdities to which Mr. Thayer has committed himself".

==== The Auk ====
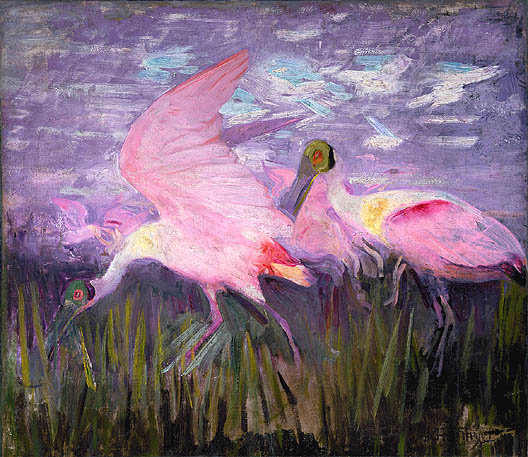
In Roseate Spoonbills 1905–1909, Thayer tried to show that even the bright pink of these conspicuous birds had a cryptic function.

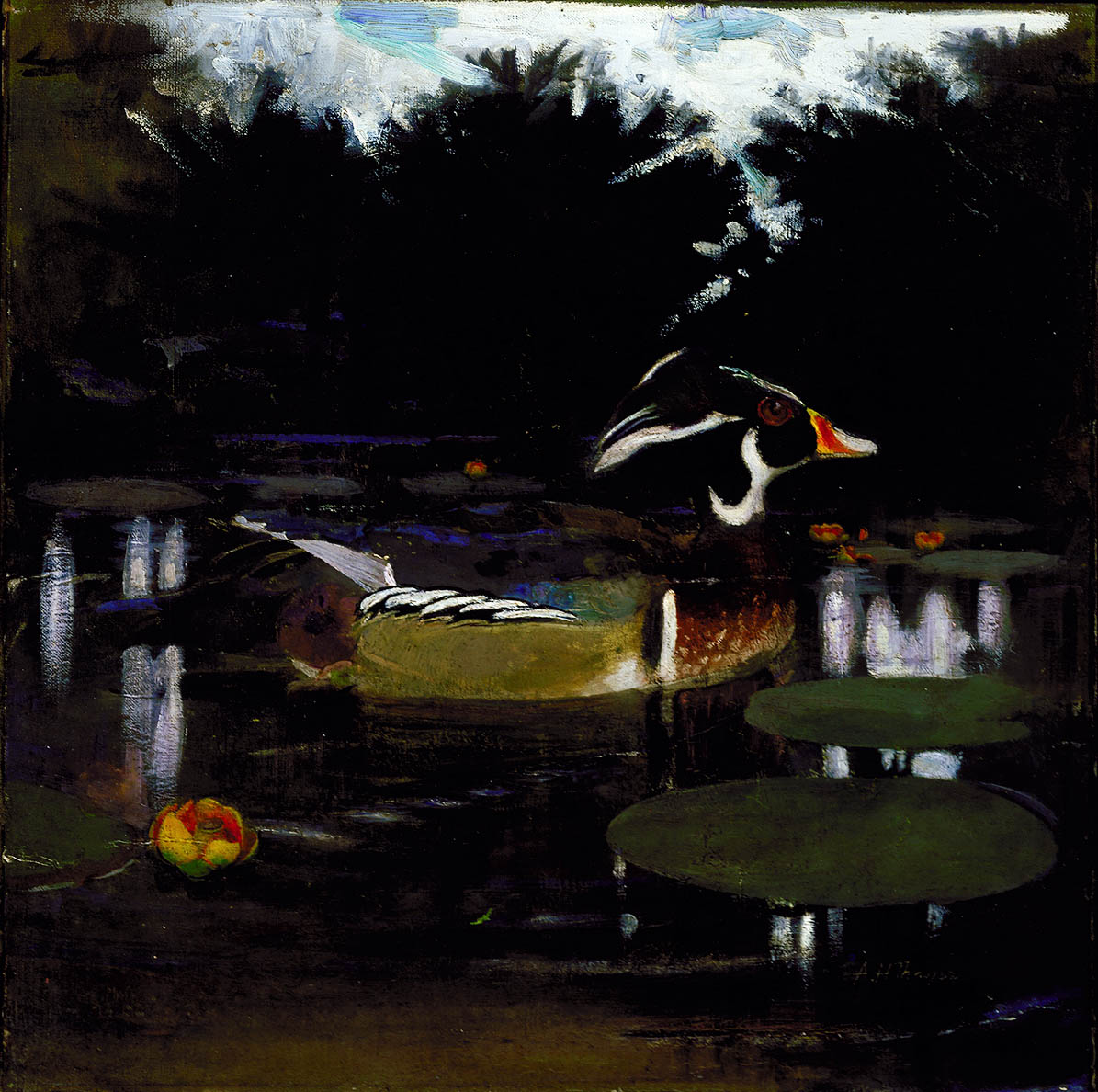
Male Wood Duck in a Forest Pool painted by Thayer for the book, to argue that the male duck's conspicuous plumage was disruptively patterned, rather than sexual dimorphism.

Thayer was also roundly criticised in 1911 by herpetologist Thomas Barbour and conservation pioneer John C. Phillips in The Auk, where they wrote that

Mr. Thayer, however, along with most other enthusiasts in a field with which they can be but partially familiar, has gone too far and claimed too much.

— Barbour and Phillips

Barbour and Phillips warmly welcome Thayer's work on countershading "which he has so excellently demonstrated"; they "protest gently" against his "slightly patronizing" treatment of the camouflage of birds like woodcock and grouse "which has been known and recognized since ornithology began"; and go on to the attack on his claims for the flamingo:

Flamingoes hardly need this carefully arranged protection that is of value but a few minutes each day, and to be sure we see the curious cloud arrangement depicted on but very few days of the year – if ever.

— Barbour and Phillips

They are equally critical of his roseate spoonbill, observing that the painting looks nothing like "actual skins of the species". As for the wood duck, they point out its [sexual] "dimorphism of plumage", and that the male spends the summer in eclipse plumage, while he is

most brilliant during the late autumn, winter, and early spring, when their surroundings are of a dead and monotonous color. Hence, if we attributed any protective importance to such color patterns, we should be inclined to consider this of distinct disadvantage."

— Barbour and Phillips

Barbour and Phillips note that Thayer "in his enthusiasm, has ignored or glossed over [sexual dimorphism] with an artistic haze." They also question whether every animal needs protection. "By skilful jugglings we are shown how anything and everything may be rendered inconspicuous," citing the skunk among other boldly black and white animals with both the skunk coloration and the "well-known skunk smell". They conclude by writing that they have "purposely omitted calling special attention to the strong features of the book" and that they have no axe to grind.

==== The Making of Species ====
The English ornithologists Douglas Dewar and Frank Finn write in their 1909 book The Making of Species that Thayer "seems to be of opinion that all animals are cryptically or, as he calls it, concealingly or obliteratively coloured". They note that Edward Bagnall Poulton had written approvingly of Thayer, and that Thayer had asserted that almost all animals were countershaded. They agree that countershading exists, but to his suggestion that it is universal "we feel sorely tempted to poke fun at him", and promptly ask any reader who agrees with Thayer that every animal is countershaded to look at a flock of rooks at sunset. They admit that camouflage is in general advantageous, but point out that the different plumages of seasonally and sexually dimorphic birds cannot all be explained as camouflage, considering the conspicuous colours of the male birds:

Now, if it be a matter of life-and-death importance to a bird to be protectively coloured, we should expect the showily coloured cock birds to be far less numerous than the dull-plumaged hens... [but] cock birds ... appear to be as least as numerous as the hens. Nor can it be said that this is due to their more secretive habits.

— Dewar and Finn

They counter the further argument that hens may be in more danger than cocks, through sitting on nests, by observing that in many dimorphic species, the showy cock shares the work of incubating the eggs.

=== Modern assessment ===
==== Hugh Cott ====
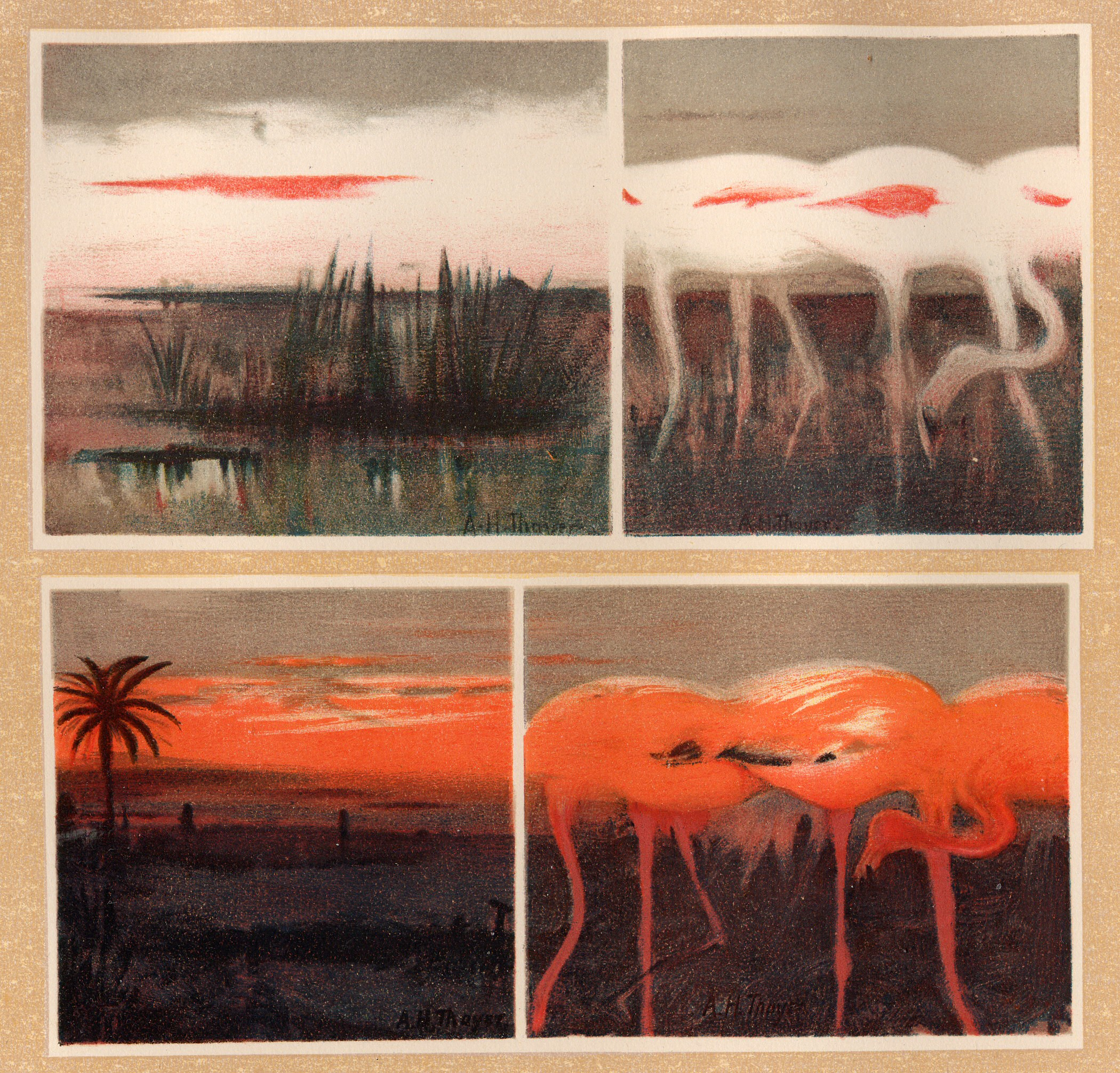
"Thayer straining the theory to a fantastic extreme": White Flamingoes, Red Flamingoes and The Skies They Simulate (dawn or dusk), painted for the book by Abbott Thayer

The zoologist and camouflage expert Hugh Cott, in his 1940 book Adaptive Coloration in Animals, writes that

The theory of concealing coloration has been brought to some discredit through the tendency of certain writers to be carried away from the facts by their own enthusiasm, and they have brought down storms of criticism which are sometimes misdirected against the theory itself... Thus we find Thayer straining the theory to a fantastic extreme in an endeavour to make it cover almost every type of coloration in the animal kingdom.

— Hugh Cott

Cott attacks Thayer's comprehensive assertion that "all patterns and colors whatsoever...are obliterative", and continues more specifically with a detailed rebuttal of both the text and Thayer's contrived paintings:

Unfortunately certain of Thayer's explanations and illustrations misrepresent nature and are deceptive because they depend upon observations made under abnormal circumstances.

— Hugh Cott

Cott then gives the examples of the peacock in the woods with the blue sky behind the neck; the "flock of red Flamingoes matching a red sunset sky", and the roseate spoonbill "whose pink plumage matches a pink cloud scheme". He then lists the cases of the white flamingo, the skunk and the white rump of the prongbuck, quoting Roosevelt ("The raven's coloration is of course concealing if it is put into a coal scuttle"), notes "How unreasonable are extreme views like that adopted by Thayer", and admits that criticisms of "certain of Thayer's conclusions" are justified, before returning to the attack on those critics, robustly defending the "theory of protective and aggressive resemblance".

More favourably, Cott explicitly recognises Thayer's work on countershading, though granting Edward Bagnall Poulton's partial anticipation with his work on the chrysalis of the purple emperor butterfly. Further, Cott quotes Thayer's description of countershading, and Cott's Figure 1, of countershaded fish, is captioned "Diagrams illustrating Thayer's principle of obliterative shading". Implicitly, also, Cott follows Thayer in his Figure 3 "Larva of Eyed Hawk-moth" in both "natural (e.g. 'up-side-down')" and "unnatural" positions; in his Figure 5 drawing of the disruptive effect of the stripes and bold markings of woodcock chicks (like Thayer's Figure 81); in his Plate 7, with (just like Thayer's Figure 7) a photograph of a white cock against a white background; in his Figure 18 and front cover drawings of a copperhead snake lying on a bed of leaves, with and without its disruptive pattern (like Thayer's Plate 11) and so on.

==== John Endler and Peter Forbes ====
The evolutionary biologist John Endler, reviewing the topic of camouflage in Proceedings of the Royal Society B in 2006, cites Thayer's 1909 book three times: for disruption, with "conspicuous elements [which] distract the predator's attention and break up the body outline, making detection of the prey difficult"; for "masquerade, [where] the prey is detected as distinct from the visual background but not recognized as edible.., for example by resembling a leaf"; and for countershading, where "False gradients are common in animal colour patterns, leading to misleading appearance of shape, even when they do not disrupt the body outline". Thayer is by far the earliest source used by Endler; the only other early source he cites (for disruption) is Hugh Cott's 1940 Adaptive Coloration in Animals.

The art and science writer Peter Forbes notes that Thayer became obsessed by the "flattening effect" of countershading, and that far from being a scientist, he was "an artist whose idealist fervour, edged by deep insecurity, led him to regard his findings less as discovery than as revelation." Describing Concealing-Coloration as a "magnum opus", Forbes writes that by 1909 "Thayer's prophetic intolerance was in full flood", that he was overcompensating for his need for approval of his artwork, and that he failed to see that acceptance of ideas in science does not depend on "the vehemence with which they are expressed". In Forbes's view, Thayer was battling for the rights of artists over scientists, citing Thayer ("it properly belongs to the realm of pictorial art") in evidence. Apart from Thayer's "bizarre" flamingos, Forbes calls Thayer's opposition to Batesian mimicry "extreme". For Forbes, "Reading Thayer's book today is a strange experience. He sets out with the idea that every single creature is perfectly camouflaged", and then "tries to bludgeon his readers" into agreeing. Forbes is critical of Thayer's rejection of warning coloration, quoting Thayer's daughter Gladys as writing "My father's special mission was tasting butterflies"; Thayer apparently wanted to prove that mimicry was the wrong explanation as both model and mimic tasted the same. Forbes observes that natural selection did not have to contend with human reactions to the taste of butterflies.

==== David Rothenberg ====
The philosopher and jazz musician David Rothenberg, in his 2012 book Survival of the Beautiful on the relationship between aesthetics and evolution, argues that while the Thayers' book set out the principles of camouflage: "From observation of nature ... art contributed to the military needs of society", Thayer, following Charles Darwin, was "swept up in the idea that every animal had evolved to perfectly live in its surroundings", but was emotionally unable to accept the other "half" of Darwin's view of animal coloration:

Thayer was quite troubled by Darwin's whole notion of sexual selection to explain the evolution of taste and beauty... On the contrary, all animal patterning can be explained by the need to remain .. hidden.. Even what appears garish, including the tail of the peacock, is in fact a sophisticated form of camouflage that can dupe even such a great scientist as Charles Darwin.

— David Rothenberg

Rothenberg then discusses the Thayers' account of the wood duck, which Rothenberg calls "our most garishly colored duck". He explains that the Thayers believed they, "trained as artists", had seen what earlier observers had missed:

The black and white patches and stripes are 'ripple pictures depicting motion and reflections in the water', all ingeniously evolved to hide the bird not by inconspicuousness but by 'disruptive conspicuousness'.

— David Rothenberg

==== Smithsonian American Art Museum ====
The Smithsonian American Art Museum's website, describing the Thayers' book as "controversial", writes sceptically that

Even bright pink flamingoes would vanish against a similar colored sky at sunset or sunrise. No matter that at times their brilliant feathers were highly visible, their coloration would protect them from predators at crucial moments so that "the spectator seems to see right through the space occupied by an opaque animal." Not all readers were convinced.

— Smithsonian Art Museum

== Bibliography ==
- Cott, Hugh. Adaptive Coloration in Animals. Oxford, London and New York, 1940.
- Dewar, Douglas; Finn, Frank. The making of species. John Lane The Bodley Head, London and New York, 1909.
- Forbes, Peter. Dazzled and Deceived: Mimicry and Camouflage. Yale, 2009. ISBN 0-300-12539-9
- Gephart, Emily. Hidden Talents: The Camouflage Paintings of Abbot Handerson Thayer. Cabinet Magazine. Issue 4, Animals, Fall 2001.
- Meryman, Richard. A Painter of Angels Became the Father of Camouflage . Smithsonian Magazine, April 1999.
- Poulton, Edward B.. The Colours of Animals. Kegan Paul, Trench & Trübner, London, 1890.
- Rothenberg, David. Survival of the Beautiful: Art, Science and Evolution. Bloomsbury, London, 2011.
- Thayer, Gerald H.; Thayer, Abbott H. Concealing Coloration in the Animal Kingdom: An Exposition of the Laws of Disguise Through Color and Pattern; Being a Summary of Abbott H. Thayer’s Disclosures. Macmillan, New York, 1909.
