= The Sisters (Thayer) =

1884 painting by Abbott Handerson Thayer

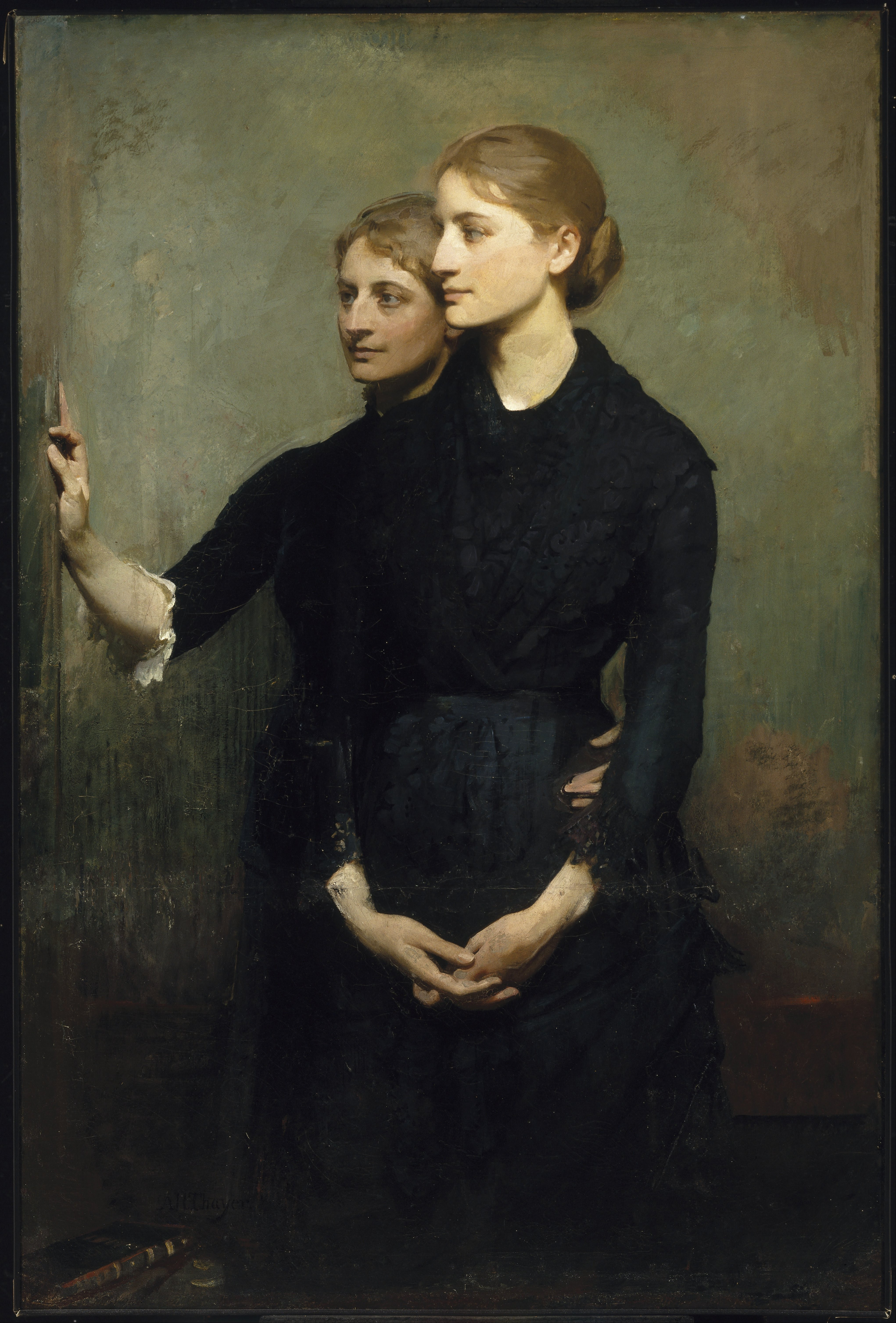
- Artist: Abbott Handerson Thayer
- Year: 1884
- Medium: Oil on canvas
- Dimensions: 138 cm × 92.1 cm (54 in × 36.3 in)
- Location: Brooklyn Museum; New York City

The Sisters is an 1884 oil on canvas painting by Abbott Handerson Thayer. It depicts Bessie and Clara Stillman, and was commissioned from Thayer by their brother, the banker James Stillman. It has been cited as one of Thayer's best works, a composition of grandeur.

== Background ==
After studying in New York City and Paris, Thayer took a studio in Brooklyn in 1880. He traveled often, summering for the next few years in Nantucket or Pittsfield, Massachusetts; in 1881, he went to Hartford, Connecticut to paint Mark Twain, and in 1882 he spent the winter in a cottage owned by Henry Ward Beecher in Peekskill, New York. In 1883, Thayer rented a home at Cornwell-on-Hudson, and built a studio on James Stillman's property. It was there that he painted two portraits of the sisters, one of Bessie alone, completed in 1883, and the double portrait, which he worked on until January 1884. Together, the paintings are quite different from his previous portraits, which had featured more opulent wardrobes in keeping with the fashionable style of the Paris Salon—an art reviewer had found fault with the "poor taste" of the glamorous finery of Thayer's 1881 Portrait of Mrs. William F. Milton, and thereafter the artist avoided ostentatious dress.

Thayer began The Sisters in the summer of 1883. It was the largest portrait he had attempted at the time and the composition was arrived upon only after much trial and error. Thayer wrote:

I have spent such an immense amount of their time and mine in experimenting on different poses, always trying to make a pretty handsome thing of each part in each new pose so as not to ascribe the fault to the composition when it really lay at the door of ugliness of the rendering that I have far from done, now, but am full of conviction that it represents progress to say the least.

and later

I have not quite done my big portrait of the two wonderful young women, one of them having been ill, but she is mending. I still hope it will be a respectable picture.

== Description ==
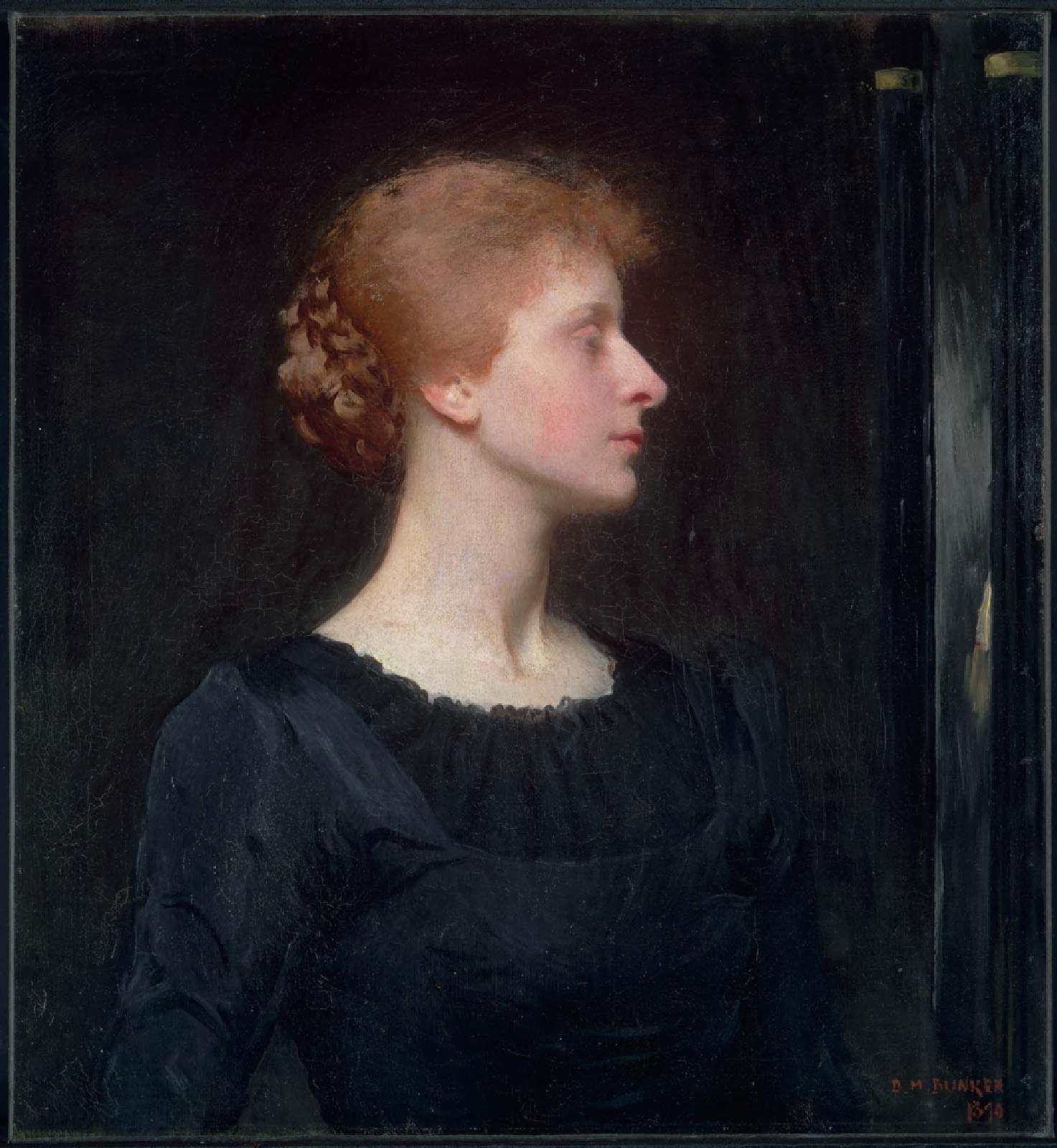
Jessica, by Dennis Miller Bunker, whose portraits were influenced by Thayer; Bunker wrote "Thayer's the first great man I ever knew, and I can't quite get used to it".

Dressed in black and set against a muted green background, the sisters are seen in a doorway. Bessie stands in front, her arms down and hands clasped in front of her. Clara stands directly behind, and wraps her left hand around Bessie's waist while resting her upraised right hand on the entryway's frame. The sisters are noble in comportment and remote in expression. The unusual positioning of their figures implies a complex and intimate relationship.

Though the overall impression is successful, the painting has been faulted for lapses in execution. The drawing of Bessie's right forearm is meager, Clara's left hand is weak, and the brushwork throughout is labored. Commissioned portraits were expected to be more highly finished, and although The Sisters was given a place of honor at the Society of American Artists exhibition of 1884, it received harsh criticism for the perceived "flimsiness" of its details. Technical faults notwithstanding, the nobility of its composition has been compared to the portraits of Thomas Eakins.

For their elegance and restrained tones, Thayer's portraits of the mid-1880s, and particularly The Sisters, have been cited as influential to the work of his younger colleague Dennis Miller Bunker.
