= Abbott Handerson Thayer =

American painter (1849–1921)

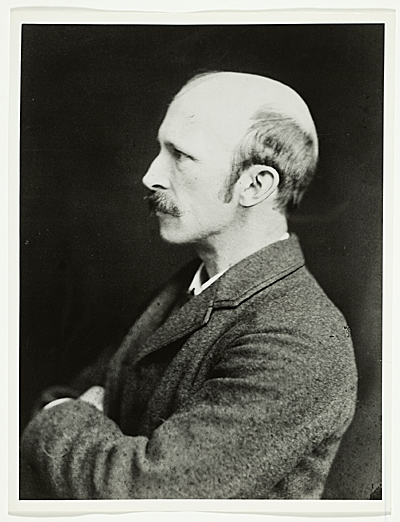
- Thayer c. 1890
- Born: August 12, 1849; Boston, Massachusetts, US
- Died: May 29, 1921 (aged 71); Dublin, New Hampshire, US
- Known for: Painting, Camouflage
- Notable work: Angel (painting); Concealing-Coloration in the Animal Kingdom (book)
- Family: Thayer family

Abbott Handerson Thayer (August 12, 1849 – May 29, 1921) was an American painter, naturalist, and teacher. As a painter of portraits, figures, animals, and landscapes, he enjoyed a certain prominence during his lifetime, and his paintings are represented in major American art collections. He is perhaps best known for his 'angel' paintings, some of which use his children as models.

During the last third of his life, he worked together with his son, Gerald Handerson Thayer, on a book about protective coloration in nature, titled Concealing-Coloration in the Animal Kingdom. First published by Macmillan in 1909, then reissued in 1918, it may have had an effect on military camouflage during World War I. However it was roundly mocked by Theodore Roosevelt and others for its assumption that all animal coloration is cryptic.

Thayer also influenced American art through his efforts as a teacher, training apprentices in his New Hampshire studio.

== Early life ==
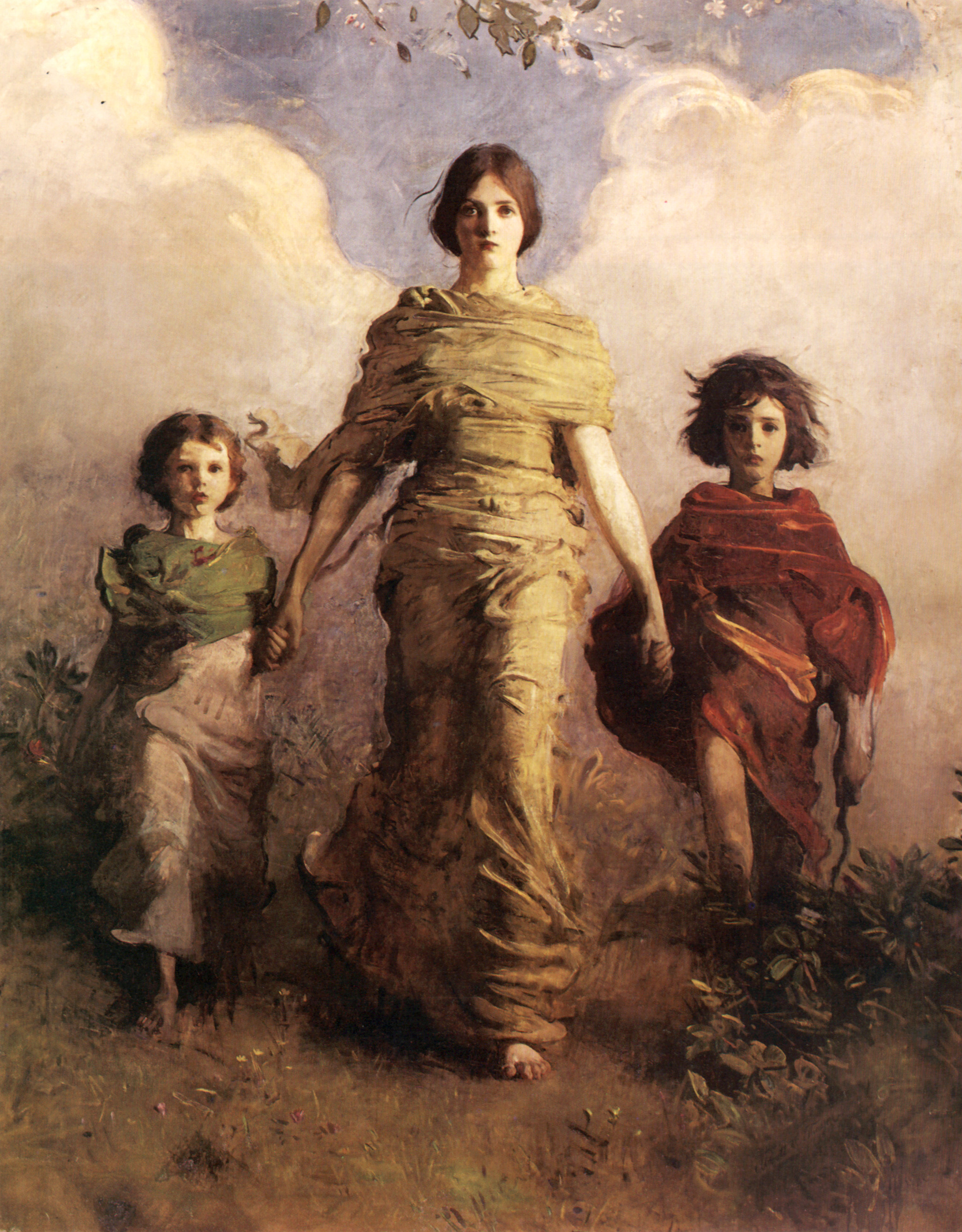
A Virgin (1892–93), painted allusion to Winged Victory of Samothrace

Thayer was born in Boston to William Henry Thayer and Ellen Handerson, members of the Thayer family. The son of a country doctor, he spent his childhood in rural New Hampshire, near Keene, at the foot of Mount Monadnock. In that rural setting, he became an amateur naturalist (in his own words, he was "bird crazy"), a hunter and a trapper. Thayer closely studied Audubon's Birds of America, experimented with taxidermy, and made his first artworks: watercolor paintings of animals.

At the age of fifteen he was sent to the Chauncy Hall School in Boston, where he met Henry D. Morse, an amateur artist who painted animals. With guidance from Morse, Abbott developed and improved his painting skills, focusing on depictions of birds and other wildlife, and soon began painting animal portraits on commission. He also taught his sister, Ellen Thayer Fisher, techniques that he was learning.

At age 18, he relocated to Brooklyn, New York, to study painting at the Brooklyn Art School and the National Academy of Design. studying under Lemuel Wilmarth. He met many emerging and progressive artists during this period in New York, including his future wife, Kate Bloede and his close friend, Daniel Chester French. He showed work at the newly formed Society of American Artists, and continued refining his skills as an animal and landscape painter. In 1875, after having married Kate Bloede, he moved to Paris, where he studied for four years at the École des Beaux-Arts, with Henri Lehmann and Jean-Léon Gérôme, and where the American artist George de Forest Brush became his closest friend. Returning to New York, he established his own portrait studio (which he shared with Daniel Chester French), became active in the Society of American Painters, and began to take in apprentices.

== Return to New Hampshire ==
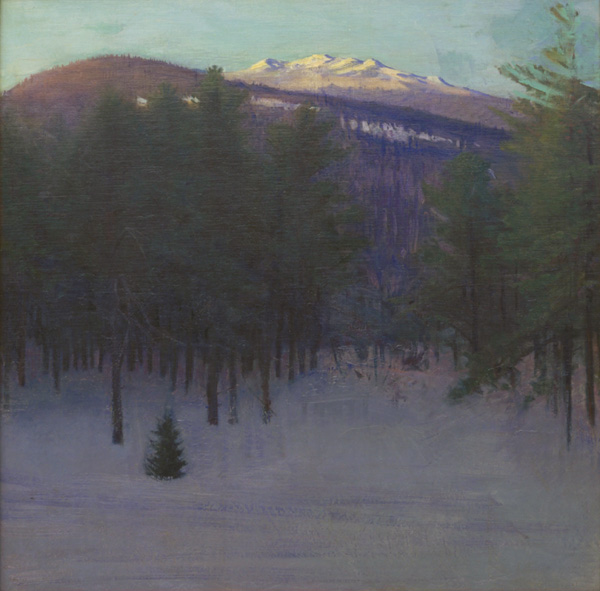
Monadnock in Winter, 1904, oil on canvas

Life became all but unbearable for Thayer and his wife during the early 1880s, when two of their small children died unexpectedly, one year apart. Emotionally devastated, they spent the next several years relocating from place to place. Although he was not yet secure financially, Thayer's growing reputation resulted in more portrait commissions than he could accept. Among his sitters were George Washington Cable, Mark Twain, and Henry James. He also made numerous portraits of the three remaining Thayer children, Mary, Gerald, and Gladys, and used them as models for symbolic compositions such as Angel (1887) and Virgin Enthroned (1891).

After her father died, Thayer's wife lapsed into an irreversible melancholia, which led to her confinement in an asylum, the decline of her health, and her eventual death on May 3, 1891, from a lung infection. Soon after, Thayer married their long-time friend, Emmeline "Emma" Buckingham Beach, whose grandfather Moses Yale Beach owned The New York Sun. He and his second wife spent their remaining years in rural New Hampshire, living simply and working productively. In 1901, they settled permanently in Dublin, New Hampshire, where Thayer had grown up. The Thayer family frequently entertained prominent guests there such as Ralph Waldo Emerson and Mark Twain.

Eccentric and opinionated, Thayer grew more so as he aged, and his family's manner of living reflected his strong beliefs: the Thayers typically slept outdoors year-round in order to enjoy the benefits of fresh air, and the three children were never enrolled in a school. The younger two, Gerald and Gladys, shared their father's enthusiasms, and became painters. In 1898, Thayer visited St Ives, Cornwall and, with an introductory letter from C. Hart Merriam, the Chief of the US Biological Survey in Washington, D.C., applied to the lord of the Manor of St Ives and Treloyhan, Henry Arthur Mornington Wellesley, the 3rd Earl Cowley, for permission to collect specimens of birds from the cliffs at St Ives. During this latter part of his life, among Thayer's neighbors was George de Forest Brush, with whom (when they were not quarreling) he collaborated on camouflage.

== Artistic achievements ==
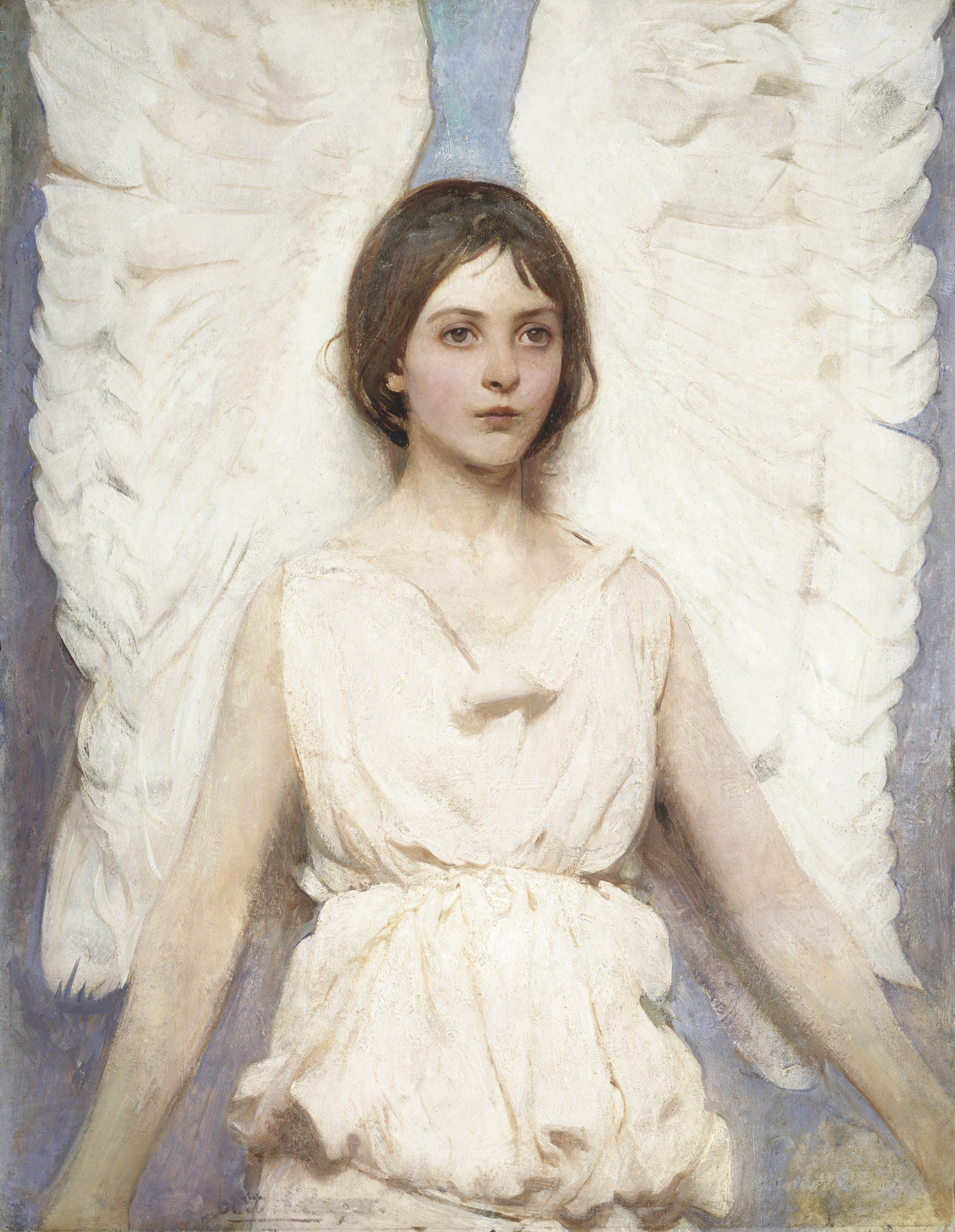
Angel, 1887, oil on canvas. Smithsonian American Art Museum

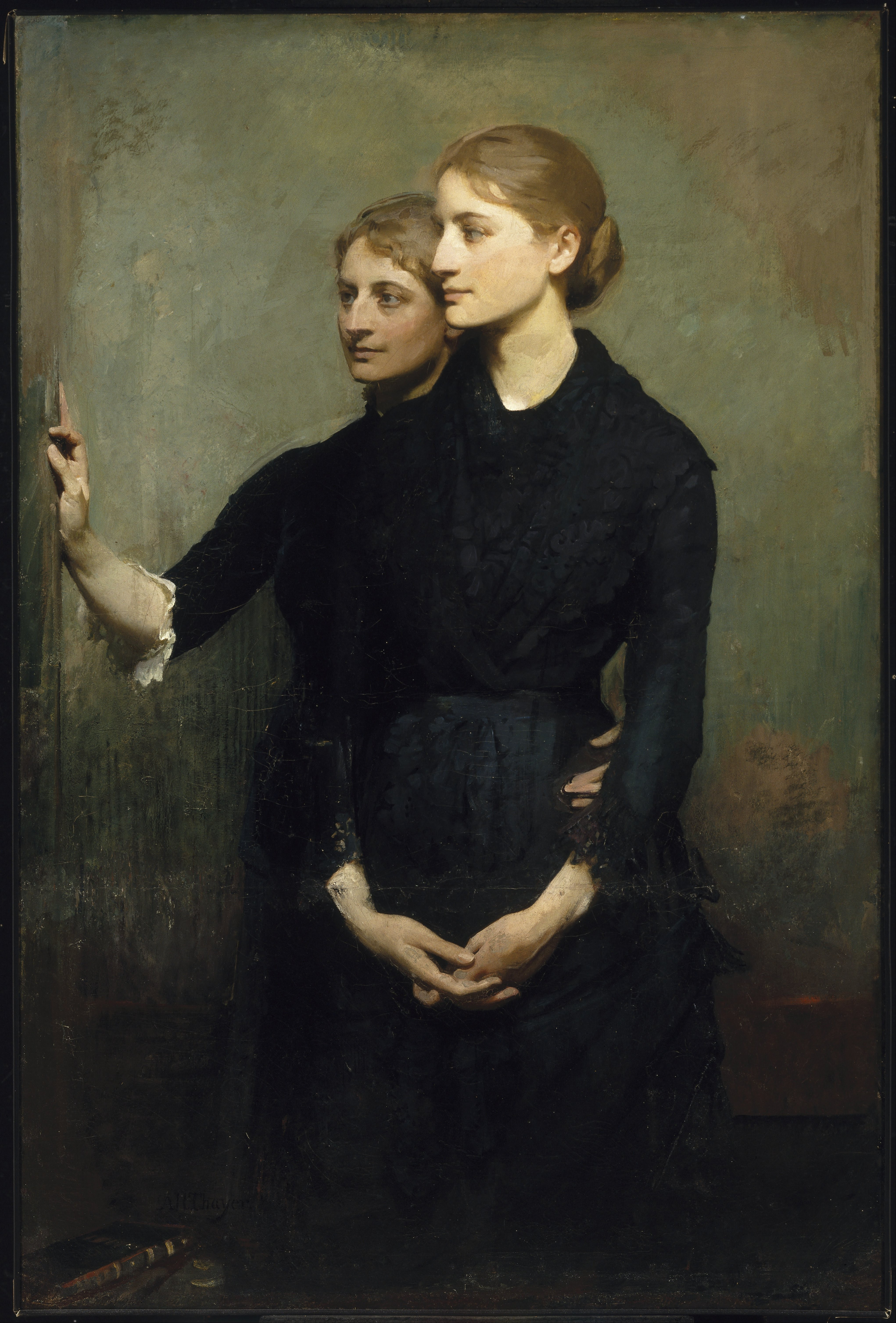
The Sisters, 1884, oil on canvas. Brooklyn Museum

It is difficult to categorize Thayer simply as an artist. He was often described in first-person accounts as eccentric and mercurial, and there is a parallel contradictory mixture of academic tradition, spontaneity and improvisation in his artistic methods. For example, he is largely known as a painter of "ideal figures", in which he portrayed women as embodiments of virtue, adorned in flowing white tunics and equipped with feathered angel's wings. At the same time, he did this using methods that were surprisingly unorthodox, such as purposely mixing dirt into the paint, or (in one instance at least, according to Rockwell Kent) using a broom instead of a brush to lessen the sense of rigidity in a newly finished, still-wet painting.

Thayer was largely surrounded by women, be they his family, housekeepers, models or students. Biographer Ross Anderson believed that in his mind "feminine virtue and aesthetic grandeur were inextricably linked"; Thayer felt that the press and even other artists contributed to the degradation of women by emphasizing their sexuality, rather than exalting their moral attributes. When he began to add wings to his figures in the late 1880s, he was making more obvious the transcendent qualities he saw in the female subject:

Doubtless my lifelong passion for birds has helped to incline me to work wings into my pictures; but primarily I have put on wings probably more to symbolize an exalted atmosphere (above the realm of genre painting) where one need not explain the action of the figures."

Thayer's first use of the theme was the painting Angel. The wings were nailed into a board, in front of which his daughter Mary stood. The poignancy of Thayer's imagery was found wanting by art critic Clarence King, who suggested the use of buckets "to catch the dripping sentiment", yet other critics like Mariana Van Rensselaer were impressed by the serenity of Thayer's vision, and saw a "distinctly modern" approach in his traditional compositions.

He survived with the help of his patrons, among them the industrialist Charles Lang Freer. Some of his finest works are in the collections of the Freer Gallery of Art, Metropolitan Museum of Art, National Academy of Design, Smithsonian American Art Museum, and Art Institute of Chicago.

== Teaching ==
Thayer was resourceful in his teaching, which he saw as a useful, inseparable part of his own studio work. Among his devoted apprentices were Rockwell Kent, Louis Agassiz Fuertes, Richard Meryman, Barry Faulkner (Thayer's cousin), Alexander and William James (the sons of Harvard philosopher William James), and Thayer's own son and daughter, Gerald and Gladys. He also had a profound influence on Dennis Miller Bunker, who, while not a formal pupil, was invited to paint alongside the older artist in 1886, and wrote "Thayer's the first great man I ever knew, and I can't quite get used to it."

In a letter to Thomas Wilmer Dewing (c. 1917, in the collection of the Archives of American Art, Smithsonian Institution), Thayer reveals that his method was to work on a new painting for only three days. If he worked longer on it, he said, he would either accomplish nothing or would ruin it. So on the fourth day, he would instead take a break, getting as far from the work as possible, but meanwhile instruct each student to make an exact copy of that three-day painting. Then, when he did return to his studio, he would (in his words) "pounce on a copy and give it a three-day shove again". As a result, he would end up with alternate versions of the same painting, in substantially different finished states.

== Camouflage contributions ==
Further information: Concealing-Coloration in the Animal Kingdom

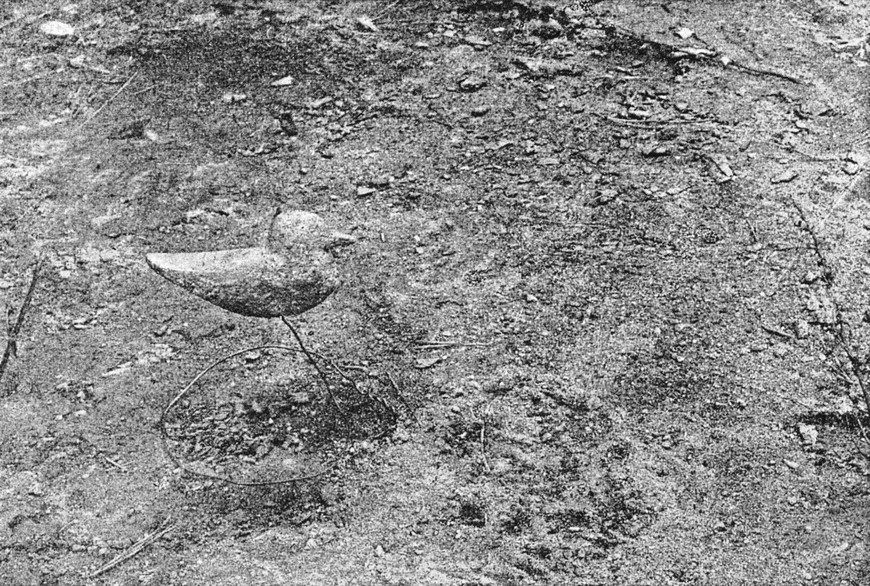
A photograph of a countershading study conducted by Thayer. The model on the left is camouflaged and visible whereas another on the right is countershaded and invisible.

Thayer is sometimes referred to as the "father of camouflage". While he did not invent camouflage, he was one of the first to write about disruptive patterning to break up an object's outlines, about distractive markings, about masquerade, as when a butterfly mimics a leaf (though here he was anticipated by Bates, Wallace, and Poulton), and especially about countershading. Beginning in 1892, he wrote about the function of countershading in nature, by which forms appear less round and less solid through inverted shading, by which he accounted for the white undersides of animals. This finding is still accepted widely, and is sometimes now called Thayer's Law. However, he became obsessed with the idea that all animals are camouflaged, spoiling his case by arguing that conspicuous birds like peacocks and flamingoes were in fact cryptically colored. He was vigorously attacked for this in a long paper by Theodore Roosevelt.

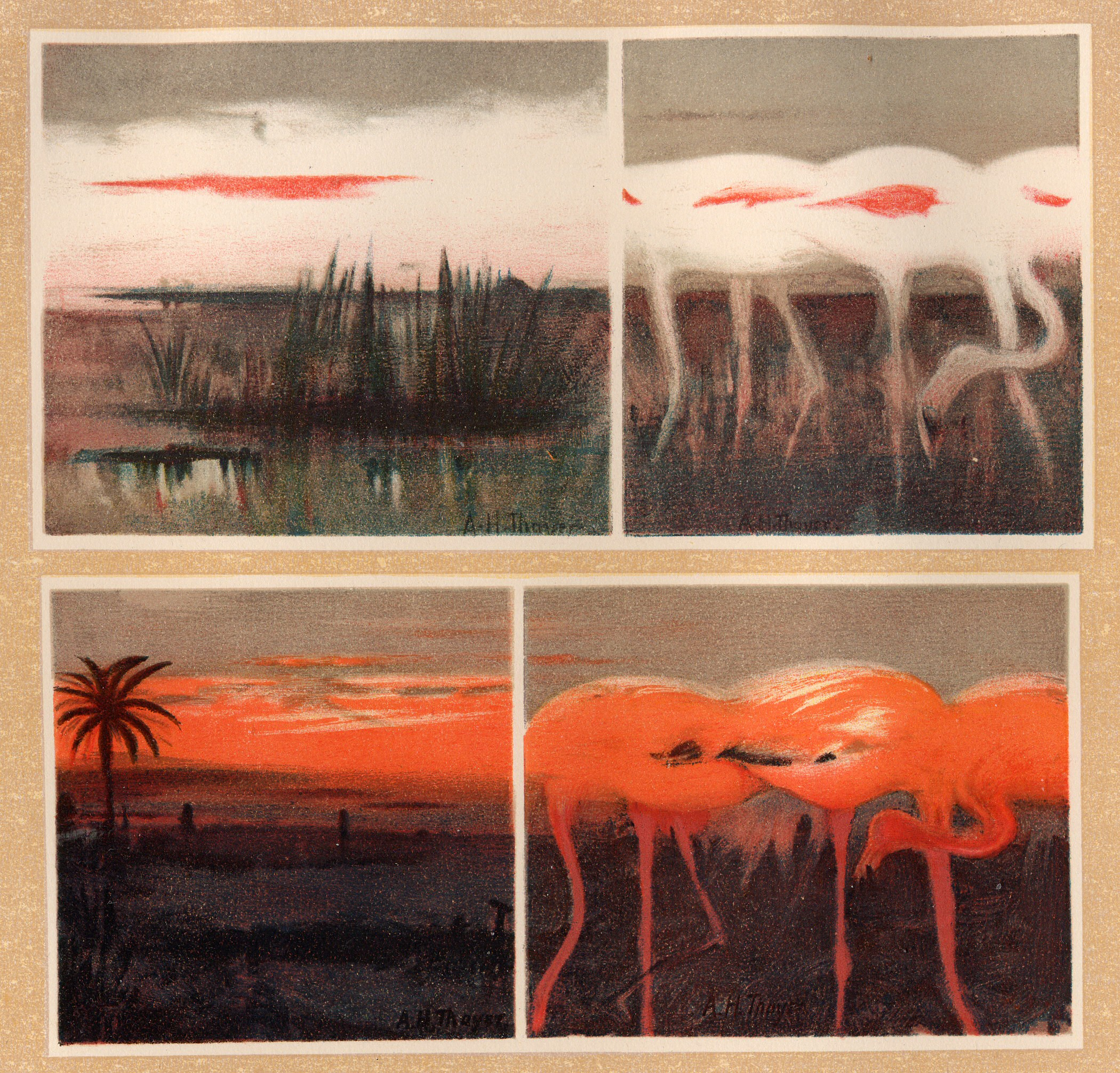
"Thayer straining the theory to a fantastic extreme": White Flamingoes, Red Flamingoes and The Skies They Simulate (dawn or dusk), painted by Thayer

Thayer first became involved in military camouflage in 1898, during the Spanish–American War, when he and his friend George de Forest Brush proposed the use of protective coloration on American ships, using countershading. The two artists did obtain a patent for their idea in 1902, titled "Process of Treating the Outsides of Ships, etc., for Making Them Less Visible", in which their method is described as having been modeled on the coloration of a seagull.

Thayer and Brush's experiments with camouflage continued into World War I, both collaboratively and separately. Early during that war, for example, Brush developed a transparent airplane, while Thayer continued his interest in disruptive or high-difference camouflage, which was not unlike what British ship camouflage designer Norman Wilkinson would call dazzle camouflage (a term that may have been inspired by Thayer's writings, which referred to disruptive patterns in nature as "razzle dazzle".)

Gradually, Thayer and Brush entrusted their camouflage work to the responsibility of their sons. Concealing-Coloration in the Animal Kingdom (1909), which had taken seven years to prepare, was credited to Thayer's son, Gerald. At about the same time, Thayer once again proposed ship camouflage to the U.S. Navy (and was again unsuccessful), this time working not with Brush, but with Brush's son, Gerome (named in honor of his father's teacher).

In 1915, during World War I, Thayer made proposals to the British War Office, trying unsuccessfully to persuade them to adopt a disruptively patterned battledress, in place of monochrome khaki, though he was too anxious to attend the meeting in person. Meanwhile, Thayer and Gerome Brush's proposal for the use of countershading in ship camouflage was approved for use on American ships, and a handful of Thayer enthusiasts (among them Barry Faulkner) recruited hundreds of artists to join the American Camouflage Corps.

== Later years ==
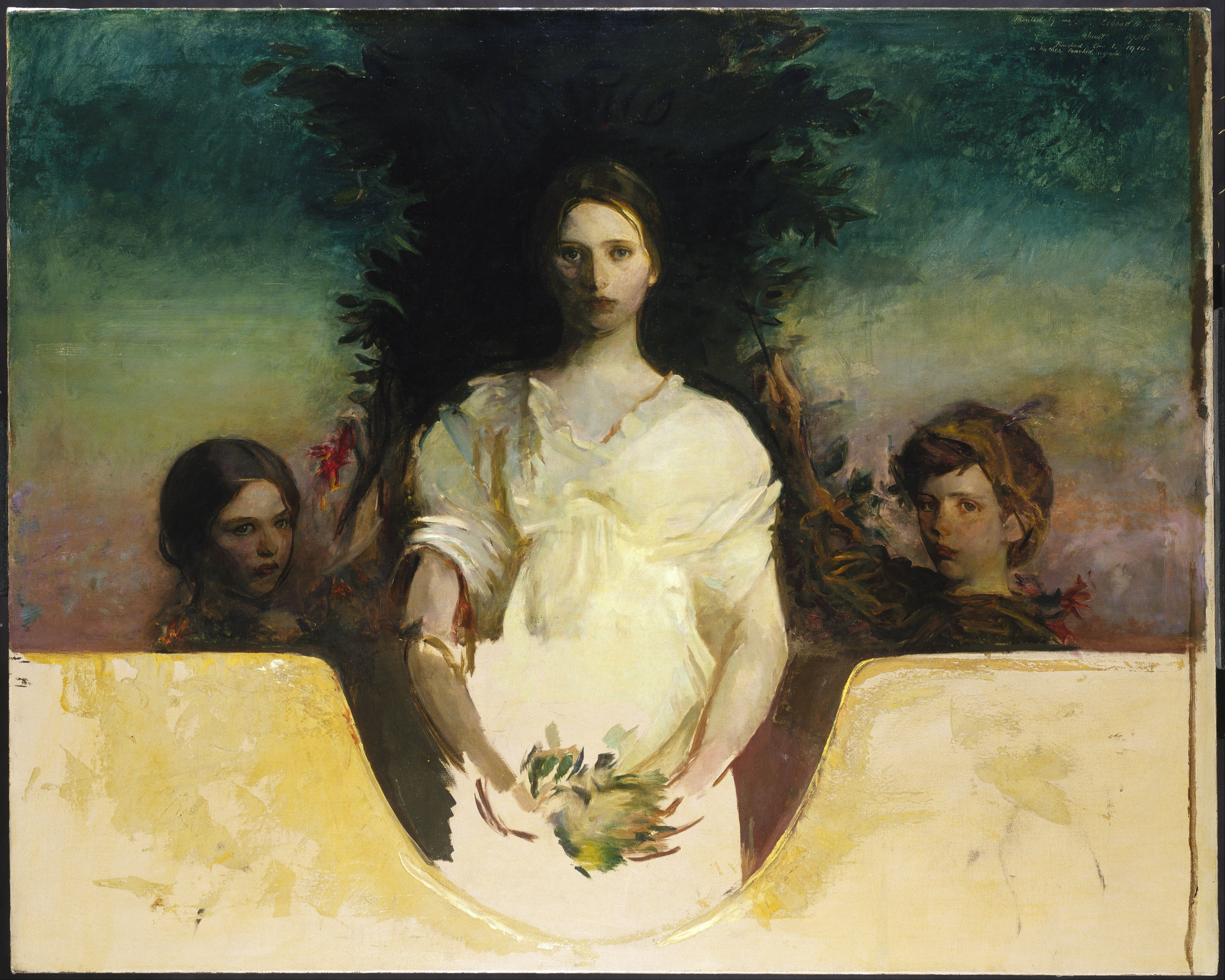
My Children, c. 1896–1910. Oil on canvas. Brooklyn Museum

Despite rapid changes in the art world in the early 20th century, Thayer's reputation remained strong. He was an early member of the American Academy of Arts and Letters. Yale University offered him an honorary degree in 1916, and the Carnegie Institute in Pittsburgh mounted an exhibition of his work in 1919 that included over fifty paintings. The view from his home of Mt. Monadnock became a favorite subject, and when the area was threatened with development Thayer campaigned successfully for its preservation.

By his own admission, Thayer often suffered from a condition that is now known as bipolar disorder. In his letters, he described it as "the Abbott pendulum", by which his emotions alternated between the two extremes of (in his words) "all-wellity" and "sick disgust". This condition apparently worsened as the controversy grew about his camouflage findings, most notably when they were denounced by former U.S. President Theodore Roosevelt. As he aged, he suffered increasingly from panic attacks (which he termed "fright-fits"), nervous exhaustion, and suicidal thoughts, so much so that he was no longer allowed to go out in his boat alone on Dublin Pond. Thayer continued to paint, but was compelled to stop working for weeks at a time due to nervous exhaustion. In an effort to avert suicidal thoughts, he sought help at a sanatorium in Wellesley, Massachusetts.

At age 71, Thayer, disabled by a series of strokes, died quietly at home on May 29, 1921.

== Legacy ==
In October 2008, a documentary film about Thayer's life and work premiered at the Smithsonian American Art Museum. Titled Invisible: Abbott Thayer and the Art of Camouflage, it featured a wide selection of his drawings and paintings, archival photographs, historic documents, and interviews with humorist P. J. O'Rourke, Richard Meryman, Jr. (whose father was Thayer's student), camouflage scholar Roy R. Behrens, Smithsonian curator Richard Murray, Thayer's friends and relatives, and others.

== See also ==
- Stevenson Memorial, a 1903 painting by Thayer to commemorate the writer Robert Louis Stevenson
- The Sisters, an 1884 oil on canvas painting by Thayer
- Thayer family

== Unpublished sources ==
- "Abbott Handerson Thayer And Thayer Family Papers", Archives of American Art Smithsonian Institution, consisting of Thayer's correspondence, photographs, and other manuscript material
- "Thomas B. Brumbaugh research material on Abbott Handerson Thayer and other artists", Archives of American Art, Smithsonian Institution
- Letter from Thayer to the land agent of Earl Cowley, dated June 2, 1898, at the Cornwall Record Office, Ref. No. GHW/12/3/6/1/91/43.

== Published sources ==
- Ross Anderson (1982). Abbott Handerson Thayer. Syracuse, NY: Everson Museum. OCLC 8857434
- Roy R. Behrens, "The Theories of Abbott H. Thayer: Father of Camouflage" in Leonardo. Vol 21 No 3 (1988), pp. 291–296.
- Roy R. Behrens, "Abbott H. Thayer's Anticipation of a Computer-Based Method of Working" in Leonardo. Vol 34 No 1 (2001), pp. 19–20.
- Roy R. Behrens, "The Meaning of the White Undersides of Animals: Abbott H. Thayer and the Laws of Disguise" in False Colors: Art, Design and Modern Camouflage (Bobolink Books, 2002). ISBN 0-9713244-0-9.
- Behrens, Roy R. (2009). "Revisiting Abbott Thayer: Non-scientific Reflections About Camouflage in Art, War and Zoology". Philosophical Transactions of the Royal Society B. 364 (1516): 497–501. doi:10.1098/rstb.2008.0250. PMC 2674083. PMID 19000975.
- Mary Fuertes Boynton (1952) Abbott Thayer and Natural History. St. Catherine Press
- Nancy Douglas Bowditch, George de Forest Brush (William Bauhan, 1970).
- Barry Faulkner, Sketches from an Artist’s Life (William Bauhan, 1973).
- Meryman, Richard (April 1999). "A Painter of Angels Became the Father of Camouflage". Smithsonian Magazine: 116–128.
- Erica E. Hirshler, Dennis Miller Bunker: American Impressionist. Museum of Fine Arts, Boston, 1994. ISBN 0-87846-423-9
- Kevin M. Murphy, "Not Theories but Revelations" The Art and Science of Abbott Handerson Thayer. Williams College Museum of Art, 2016. ISBN 978-0981576275
- Elizabeth Prelinger, The Gilded Age: Treasures from the Smithsonian American Art Museum. Watson-Guptill, New York, 2000. ISBN 0-8230-0192-X
- Hanna Rose Shell, '"Instantaneous Photography and Abbott Thayer's Modeling of Invisibility in Nature and Man" in Hide and Seek: Camouflage, Photography, and the Media of Reconnaissance (Zone Books, 2012). ISBN 9-7819-3540-822-2
- Abbott H. Thayer and Gerald H. Thayer, Concealing Colouration in the Animal Kingdom (New York: Macmillan, 1909/1918).
- Nelson C. White, Abbott H. Thayer: Painter and Naturalist (Connecticut Printers, 1951).
- Nancy Stula with Nancy Noble, American Artists Abroad and their Inspiration (New London: Lyman Allyn Art Museum, 2004).
