= Gladys Thayer =

American painter

Gladys Thayer Reasoner
- Born: Gladys Thayer; July 17, 1886; South Woodstock, Connecticut, United States
- Died: August 25, 1945 (aged 59); Washington, D.C., United States
- Known for: Painting
- Style: Portraiture; Floral art
- Spouse: David Reasoner

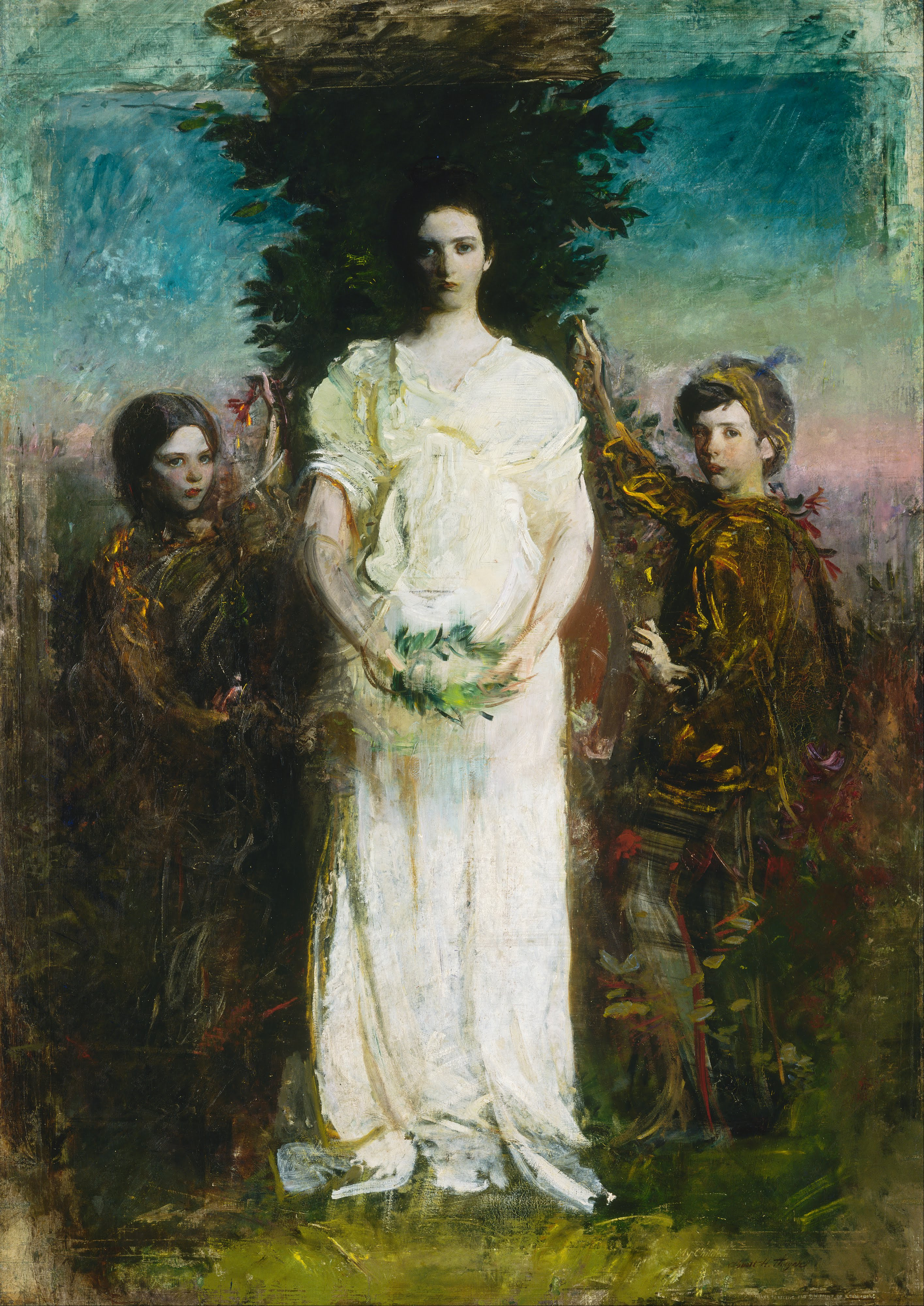
My Children (Mary, Gerald, and Gladys Thayer), circa 1897, oil on canvas by Abbott Handerson Thayer

Gladys Thayer (also known as Gladys Thayer Reasoner) (1886–1945) was an American painter and teacher.

== Life ==
Gladys Thayer was born in 1886 in South Woodstock, Connecticut. She was the child of artists Catherine "Kate" Bloede Thayer and Abbott Handerson Thayer. Through her mother she was the granddaughter of Marie "Mary" Bloede (born Marie Antoinette Franziska Jungnitz, pen name Marie Westland) and niece of Gertrude Bloede (pen name Stuart Sterne).

Thayer was a frequent model in her father's paintings, including My Children (Mary, Gerald, and Gladys Thayer) (circa 1897)---alongside her older sister Mary, and her older brother Gerald---and in the "Winged Figure" series (1904–11).

She was married to artist David Reasoner. She had four children with Reasoner.

Her father taught her how to paint. She painted flowers and portraiture. She died in 1945 in Washington, D.C.

== Notable collections ==
- "Hooded Warblers, study for book Concealing Coloration in the Animal Kingdom" - ca. 1900 – 1909, watercolor on paper, stencil, and oil on wood, Smithsonian American Art Museum
