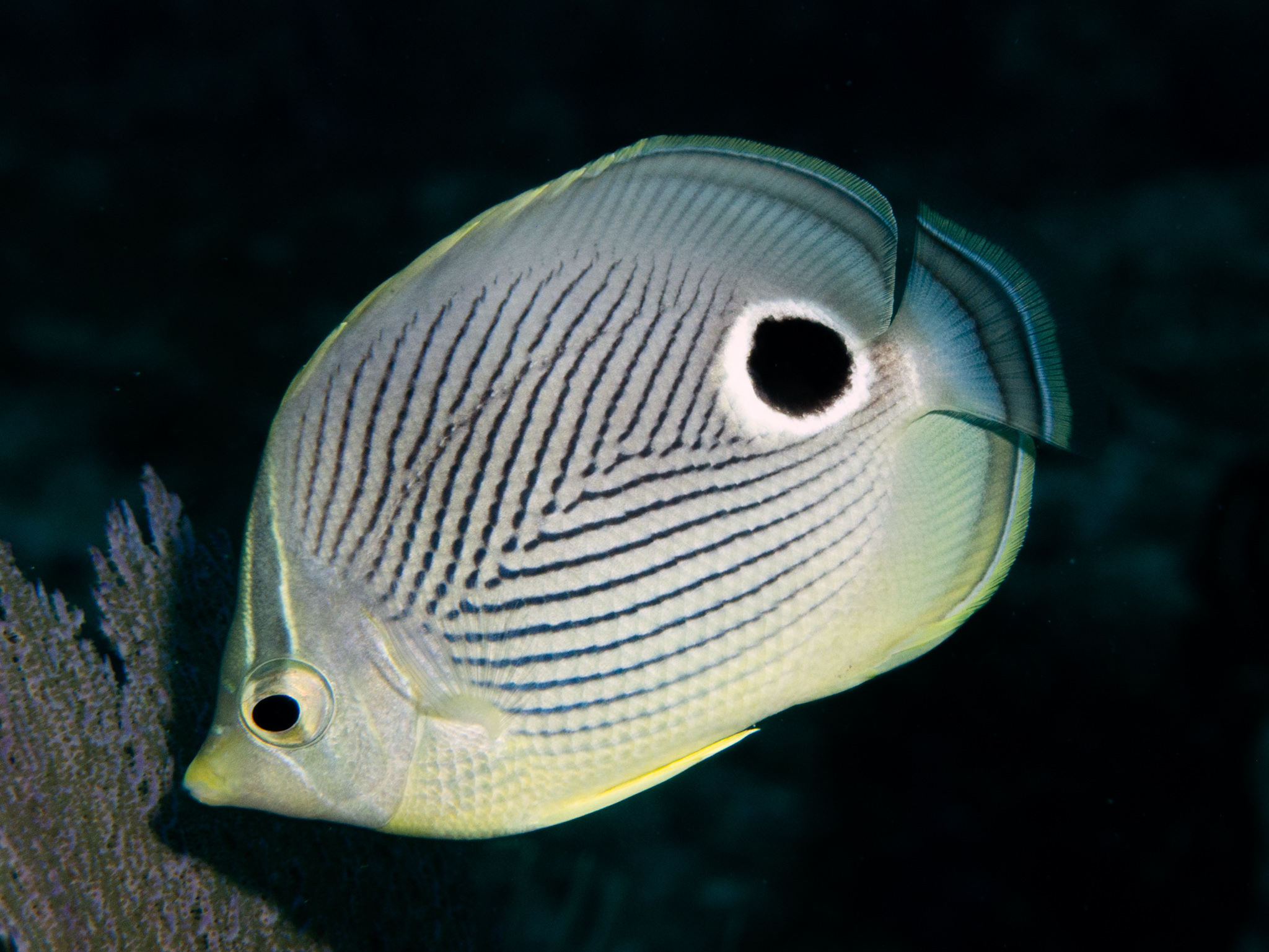
- At Grand Cayman

Conservation status
- Least Concern (IUCN 3.1)

Scientific classification
- Kingdom: Animalia
- Phylum: Chordata
- Class: Actinopterygii
- Division: Teleostei
- Order: Acanthuriformes
- Family: Chaetodontidae
- Genus: Chaetodon
- Subgenus: Chaetodon (Chaetodon)
- Species: C. capistratus

Binomial name
- Chaetodon capistratus Linnaeus, 1758

Synonyms
- Chaetodon bricei Smith, 1898

= Foureye butterflyfish =

Species of fish

The foureye butterflyfish or four-eyed butterflyfish (Chaetodon capistratus) is a species of marine ray-finned fish in the butterflyfish family Chaetodontidae. This species is found in the Western Atlantic, from New England through Bermuda and the West Indies to northern South America.

== Taxonomy ==
Chaetodon capistratus is the type species of Chaetodon. Hence, if this genus is split up as some have proposed, it will retain its present binomial name along with its closest relatives, which include the banded butterflyfish (C. striatus) and the spot-finned butterflyfish (C. ocellatus).

== Description ==
The foureye butterflyfish is deep-bodied and laterally compressed, with a single dorsal fin and a small mouth with tiny, bristle-like teeth. The body is light grey, sometimes with a yellowish hue, on which there are many forward-pointing dark chevrons. At the rear portion of each side of the body, the chevrons are replaced by a white-margined black ocellus (which is vertically oval in juveniles and more circular in adults); this feature leads to the common name of this species. The two ocelli are much more visible than the true eyes, which are smaller and are run through by a black vertical bar. Similar to the other butterflyfish species with the ocellus feature, this pattern is an instance of automimicry, and is designed to disorientate predators and make them think that the rear of the fish is actually the front.

== Behavior ==
=== Other functions of the ocelli ===
Other potential functions of the ocelli may exist. These include: intimidating prey, altering predation reaction distances, serving as a general warning and social communication.

=== Movement ===
The foureye butterflyfish is known for its uncanny ability to swim in and around coral heads and reefs, being able to find its way through the most intricate passages by swimming on its side or even upside down.

=== Last resort methods ===
When escape is not possible, the foureye butterflyfish will sometimes turn to face its predator, head lowered and spines fully erect, like a bull about to charge. This may serve to intimidate the predator or to remind it that the butterflyfish is much too spiny to make a comfortable meal.

== Diet and reproduction ==
The foureye butterflyfish usually frequents shallow inshore waters, where it feeds on a variety of invertebrates, mainly zoantharians, sea anemones, scleractinians, polychaete worms, gorgonians, tunicates and crustaceans. It may also eat fish eggs. Like its relatives, the foureye butterflyfish mates for life, and so is often seen in pairs. This behavior is rare among fishes.

== Gallery ==
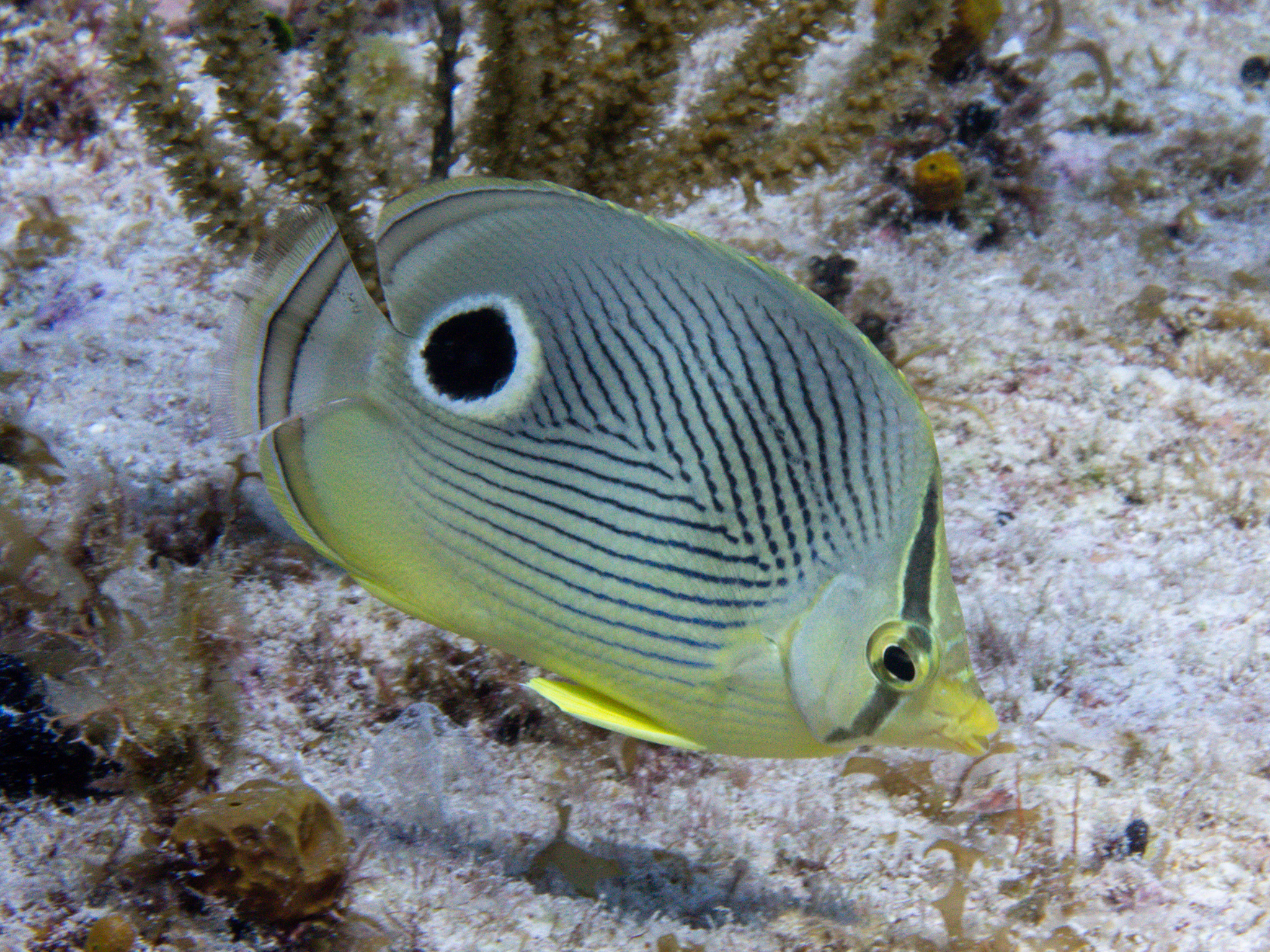
At Grand Cayman

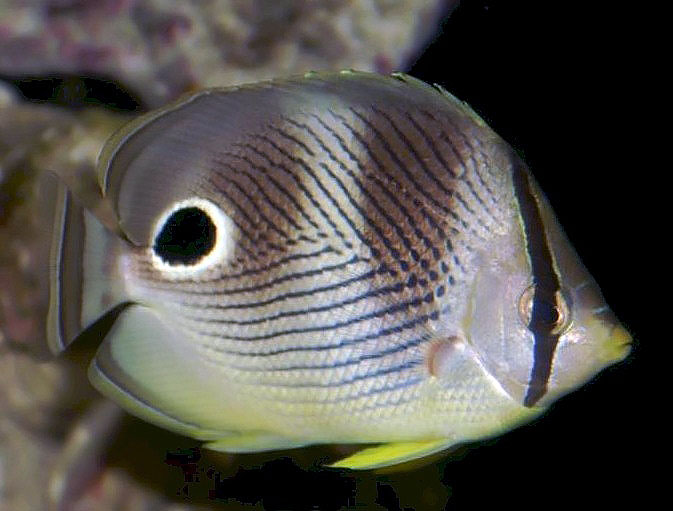
Showing dark bands

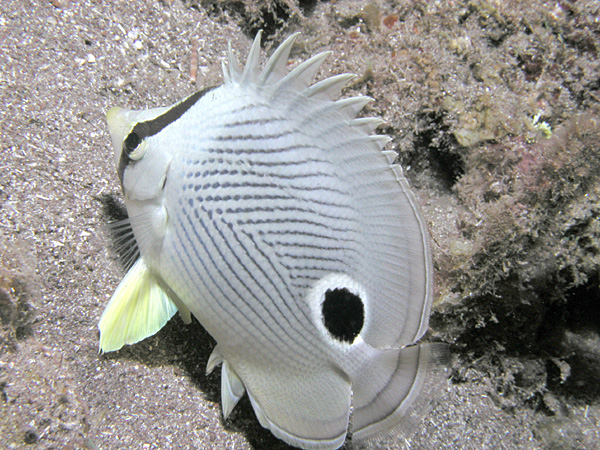
With fins fully extended

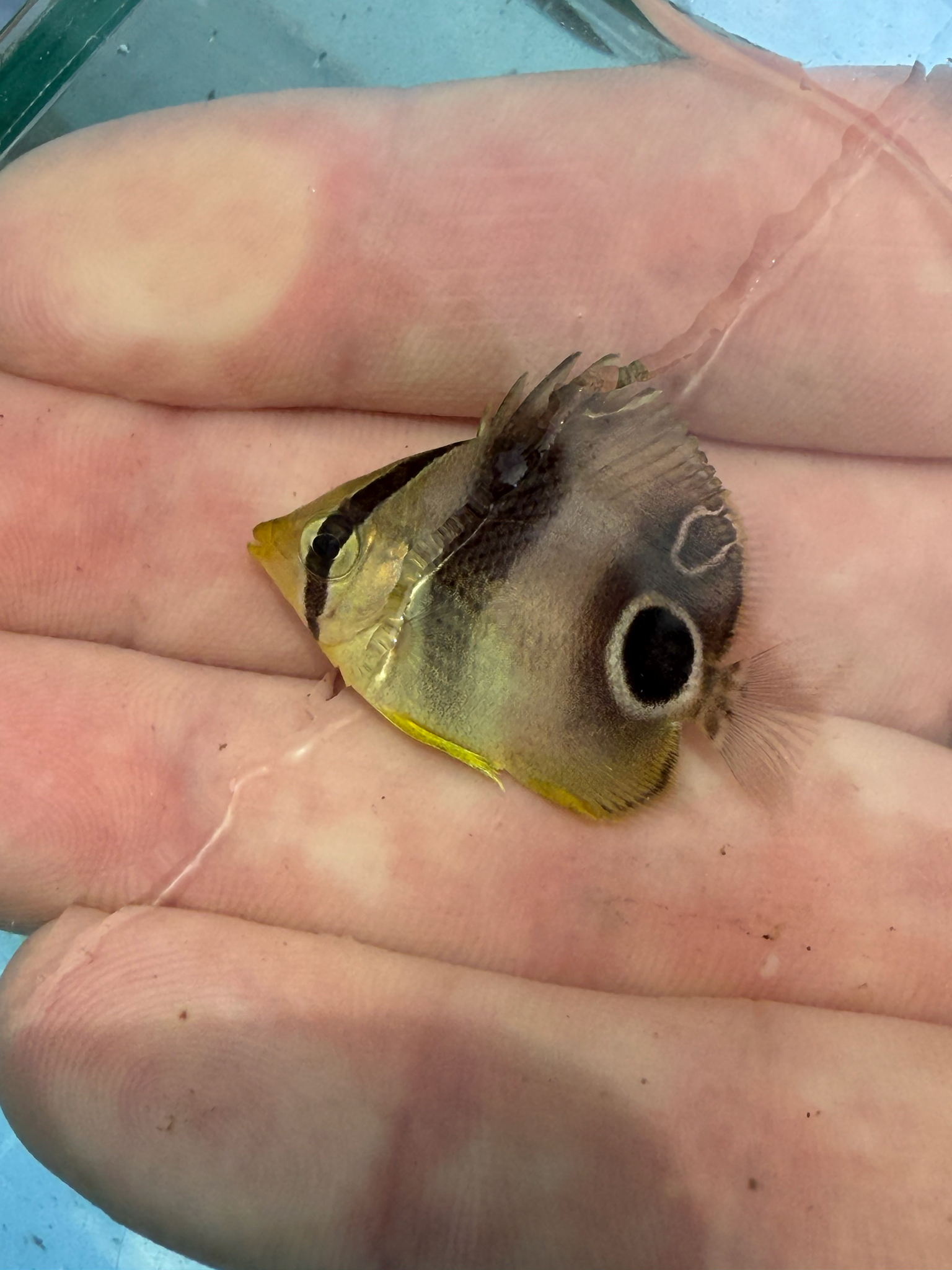
Young juvenile, Long Island (NY)

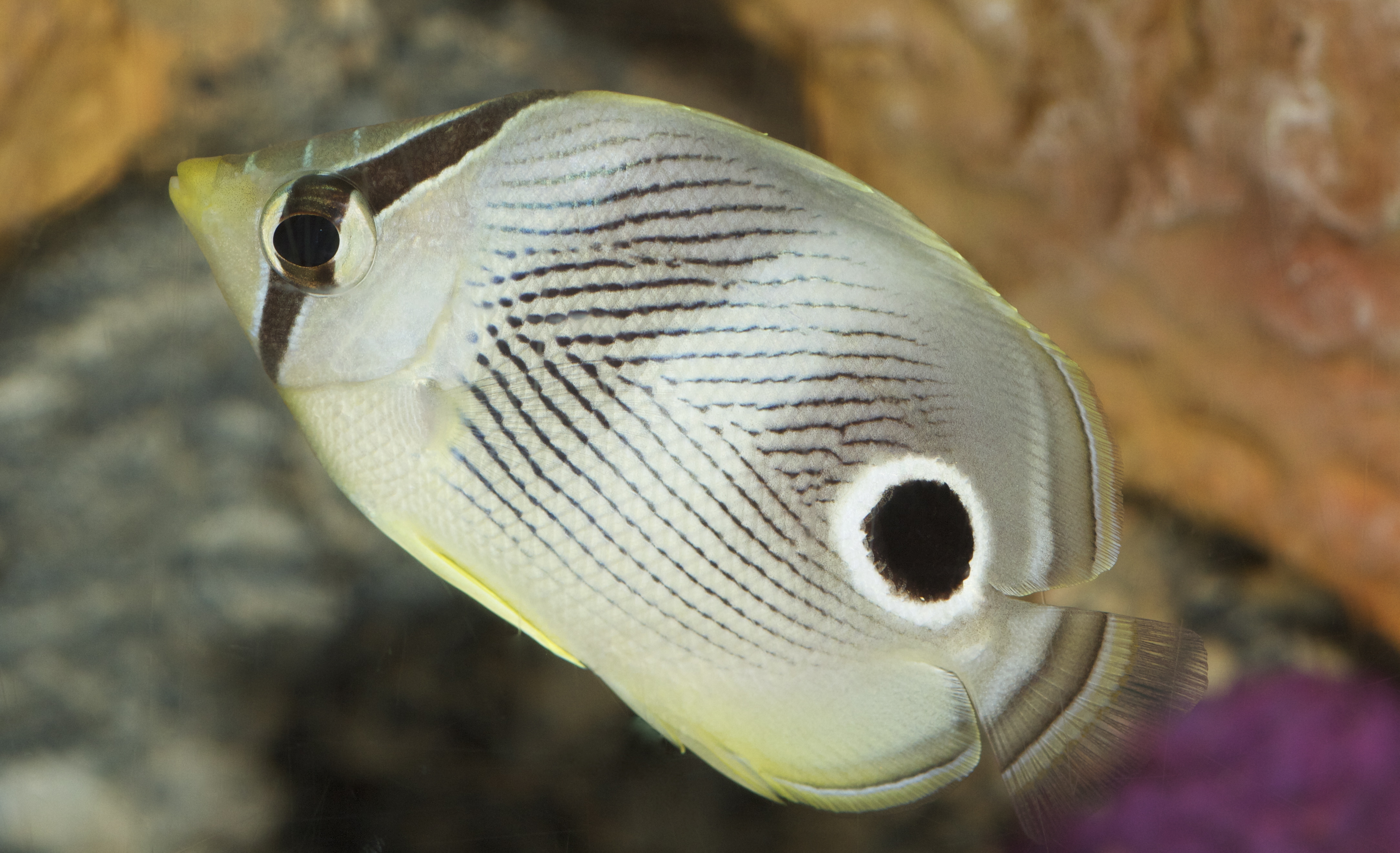
Juvenile

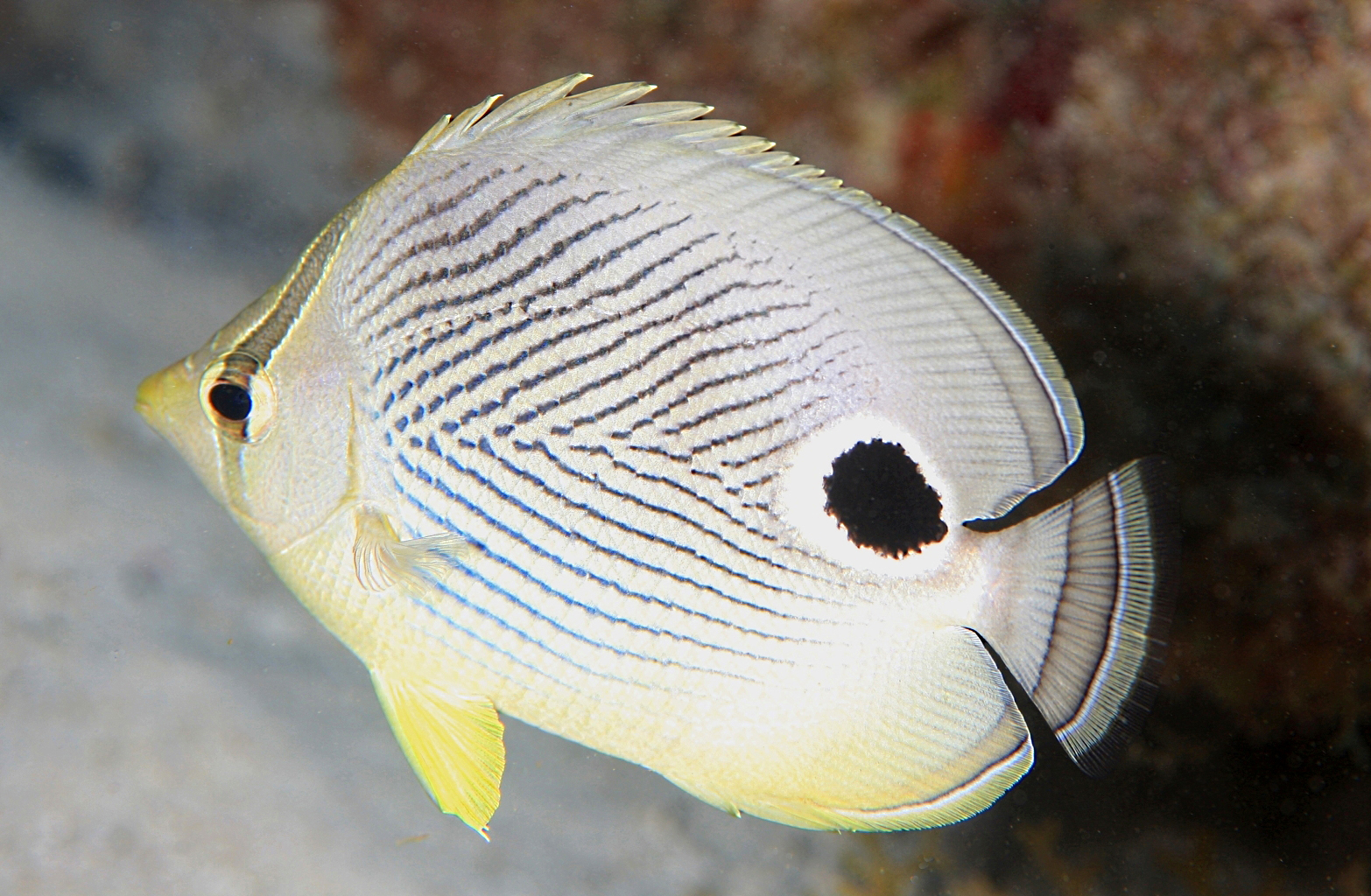
At Curaçao
