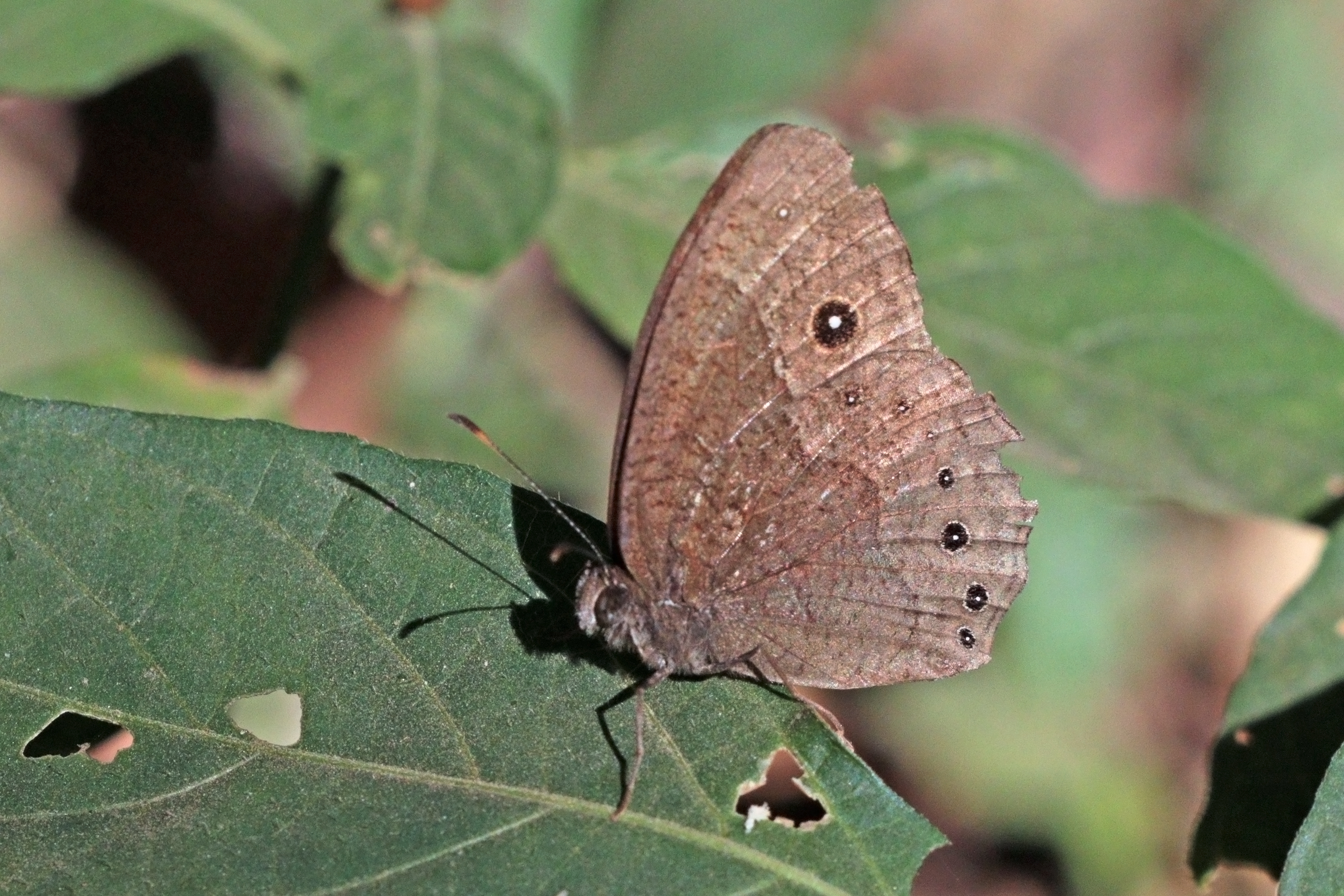
- B. a. anynana, Harenna Forest, Ethiopia

Conservation status
- Least Concern (IUCN 3.1)

Scientific classification
- Kingdom: Animalia
- Phylum: Arthropoda
- Clade: Pancrustacea
- Class: Insecta
- Order: Lepidoptera
- Family: Nymphalidae
- Genus: Bicyclus
- Species: B. anynana

Binomial name
- Bicyclus anynana (Butler, 1879)

Synonyms
- Mycalesis anynana Butler, 1879; Mycalesis anynana f. vicaria Thurau, 1903; Mycalesis anynana var. neglecta Thurau, 1903

= Bicyclus anynana =

Squinting bush brown

Species of butterfly

Bicyclus anynana (squinting bush brown) is a small brown butterfly in the family Nymphalidae, the most globally diverse family of butterflies. It is primarily found in eastern Africa from southern Sudan to Eswatini. It is found mostly in woodland areas and flies close to the ground. Male wingspans are 35–40 mm and female wingspans are 45–49 mm.

The bush brown is helpful for research because of its ideal size and breeding time. In addition to this, the bush brown is one of many insect species to vary its coloration depending on the season, making it a valuable tool in studying phenotypic plasticity. Wet seasons produce butterflies with large eyespots, while dry seasons have butterflies dull in color.

Male butterflies engage in mud-puddling, which involves taking up nutrients by aggregating on wet soil and dung. Males use pheromones to attract females during courtship. However, courtship in the bush brown is notable for its plasticity: temperature during adult development plays a large role in determining the rate of male courtship as well as the roles of males and females during the courtship process. The bush brown uses its eyespots as a defense against avian predators. In addition, females choose male mates based on their eyespots; in a process known as stabilizing selection, eyespots that are too large or too small are selected against.

== Description ==
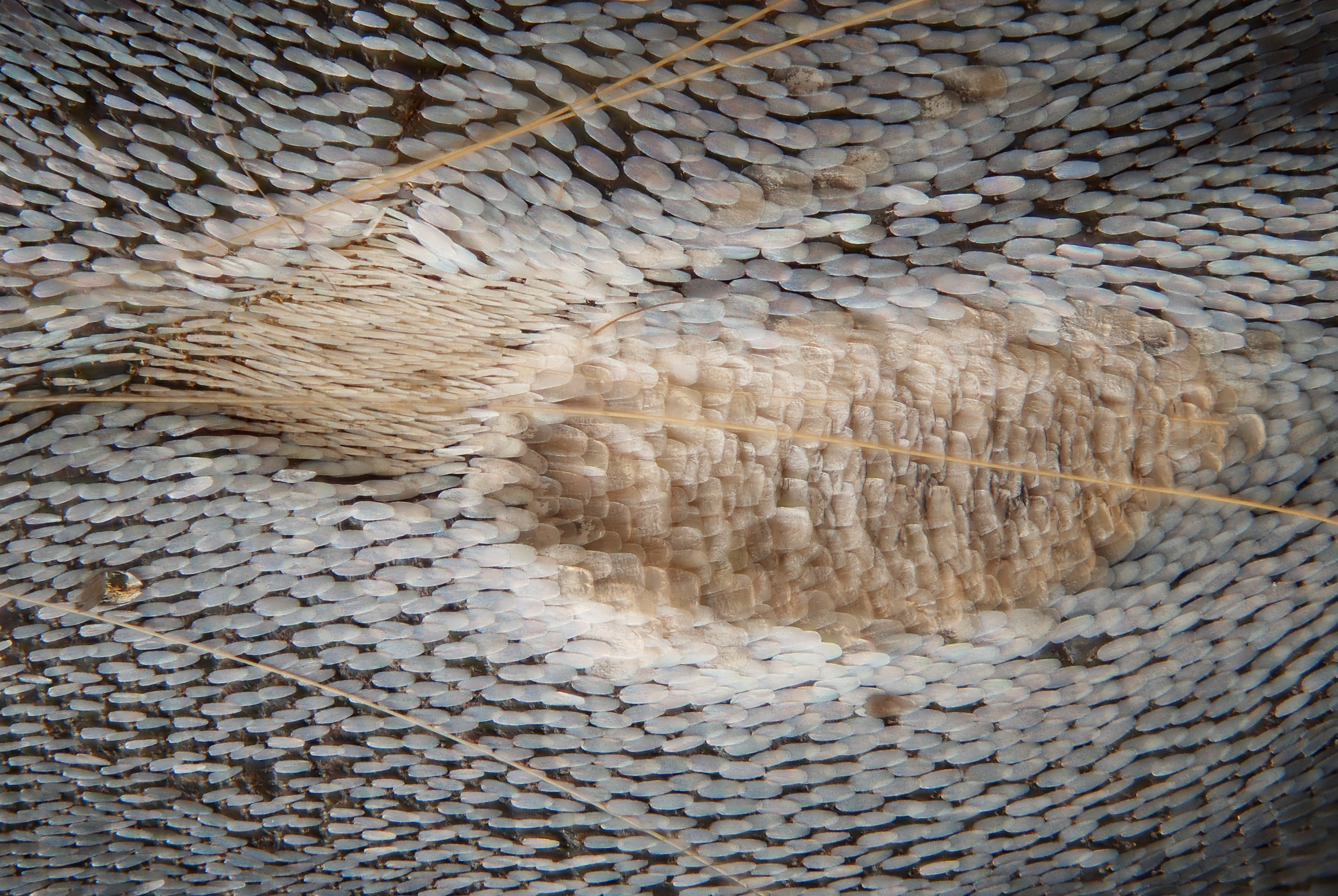
Androconial spot on the hind wing of the African butterfly Bicyclus anynana.

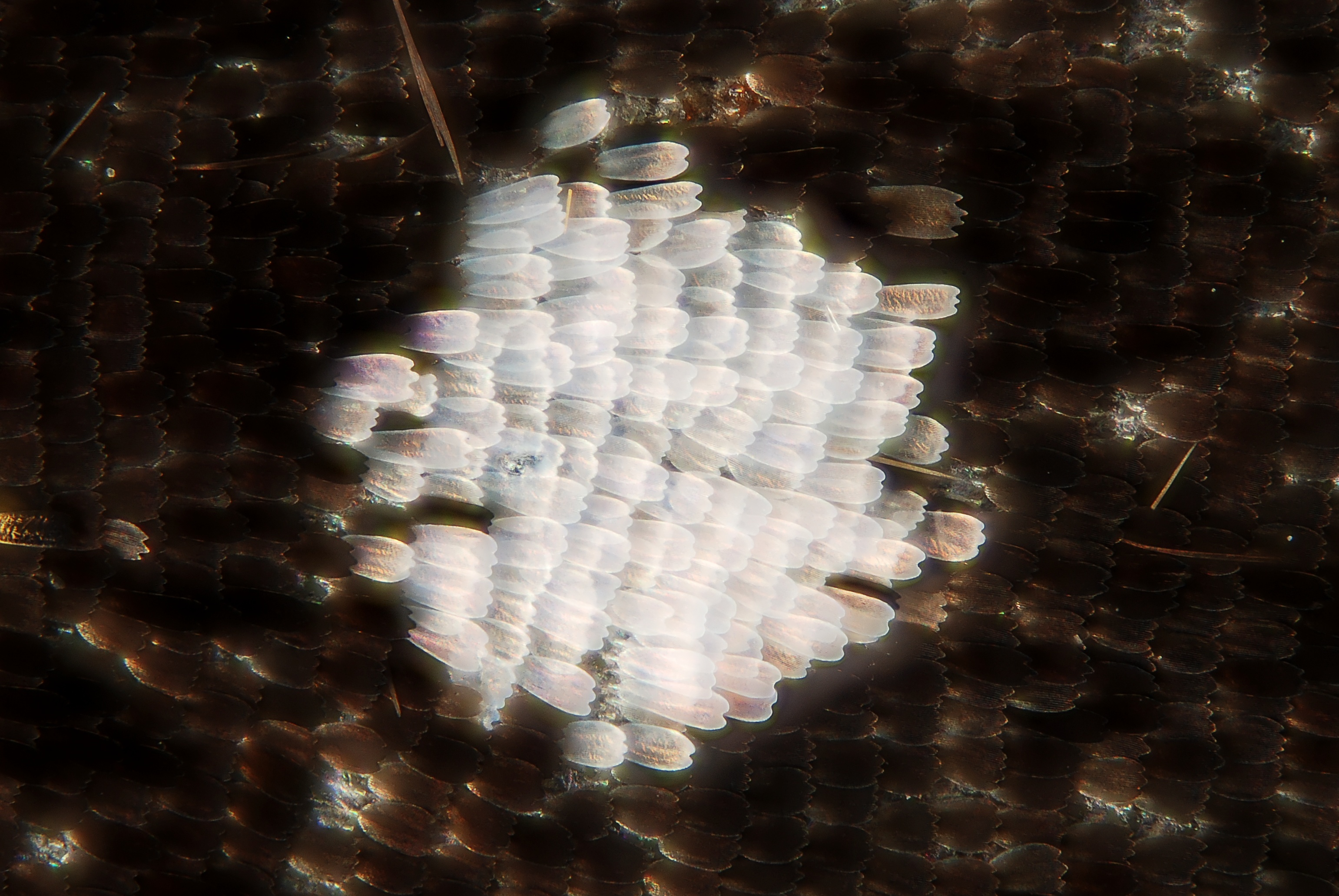
The center pupil of the so called anterior "eyespot" on the fore wing of the African butterfly Bicyclus anynana scale.

The bush brown is a small brown butterfly with a wingspan of 35–40 mm (1.4–1.6 in) for males and 45–49 mm (1.8–1.9 in) for females. Males have sexual traits on their wings called androconia that release pheromones during courtship. The butterflies is characterized by their unusually short front legs and their rather non-descript brown wings. Bush browns, however, are known for having several large eyespots in the wet season. There are two extended generations per year. The wet-season form is on wing in spring and summer and the dry-season form in autumn and winter

== Role in research ==
Originally the bush brown was collected to study evolutionary and ecological genetics. This research is now primarily used to see how the environment shapes the phenotypic evolution of the butterfly.

The squinting bush brown is an ideal butterfly for conducting research. Its relative small size makes it easy to breed and care for, while it is large enough to place tags on and surgically manipulate. Their phenotypic plasticity in life history traits, wing patterns, and seasonal habits combined with the fact that their entire genome has been sequenced makes them ideal subjects in understanding how the environment effects genes.

== Taxonomy ==
The squinting bush brown is of the genus Bicyclus and the family Nymphalidae. It belongs to the order Lepidoptera. It is separated into three distinct subspecies; B. anynana anynana, B. a. centralis, and B. a. socotrana.

The squinting bush brown is found in eastern Africa. B. a. anynana can be found from Kenya to Tanzania and Ethiopia as well as in Zambia, Malawi, Mozambique, Rhodesia, Botswana, South Africa, and the Comoro Islands. B. a. centralis is present in Uganda, southern Zaire, eastern Zaire, and northern Angola. Bicyclus anynana socotrana is predominantly located in Socotra Island.

As the squinting bush brown is widespread and common throughout its distribution, its conservation status is secure and has no reported management needs.

== Life cycle ==
The squinting bush brown can live up to half a year in the wild and reaches sexual maturity around 2 weeks.

The larvae feed on a wide variety of different grass or even a few types of Cyperus plants.

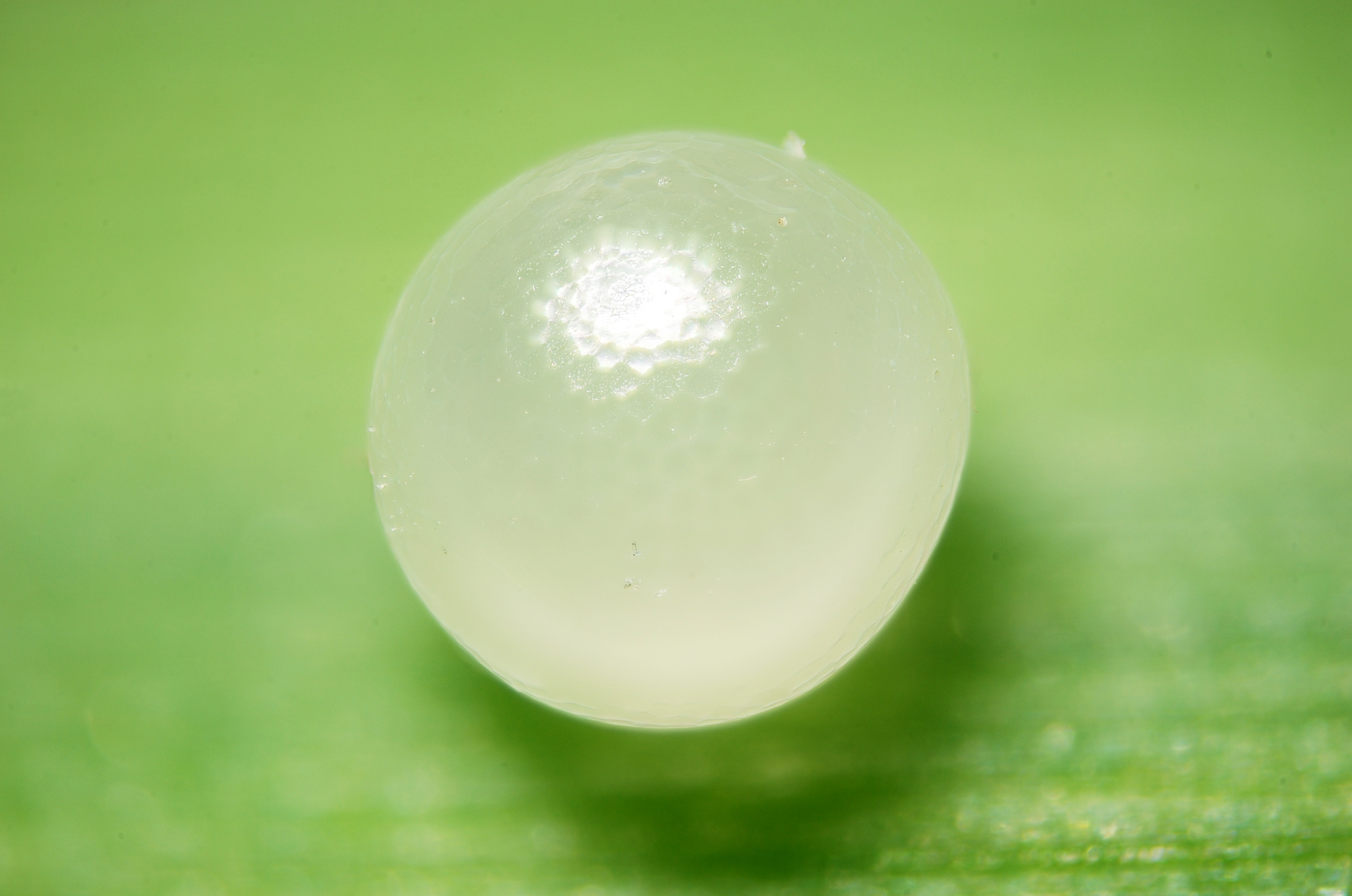
Egg

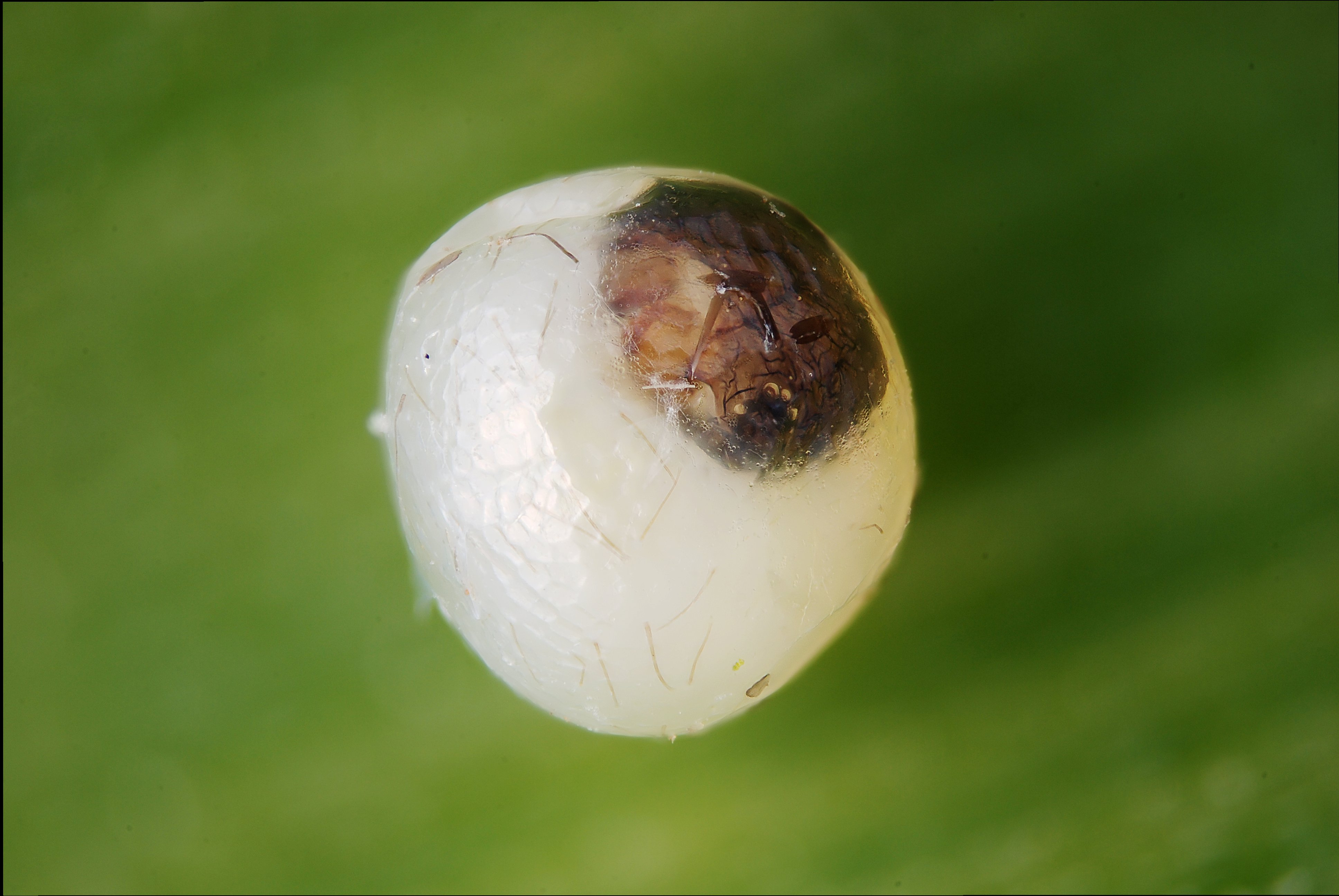
Egg on a corn (Zea mays) leaf with caterpillar visible through the egg shell

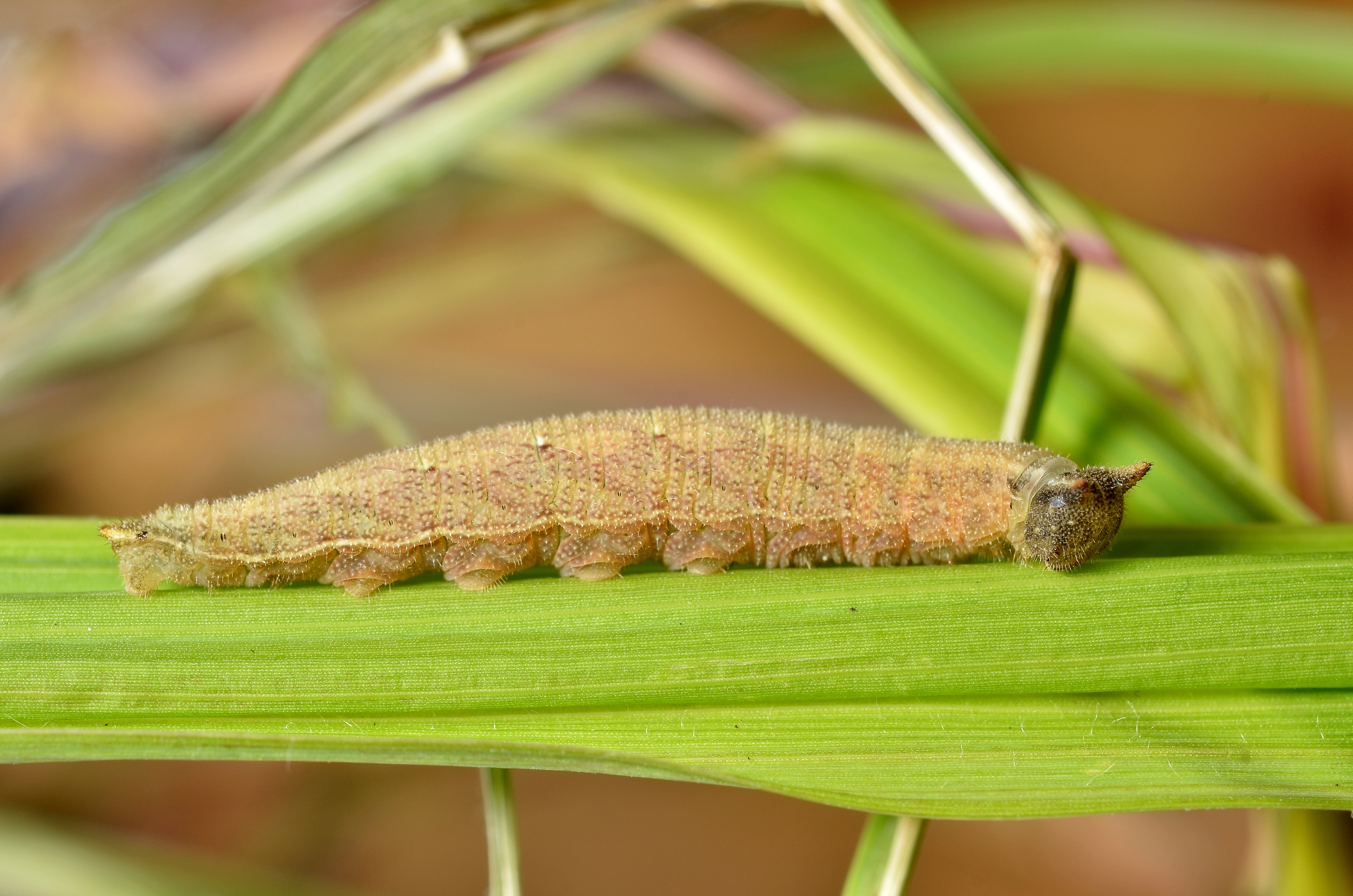
Larva

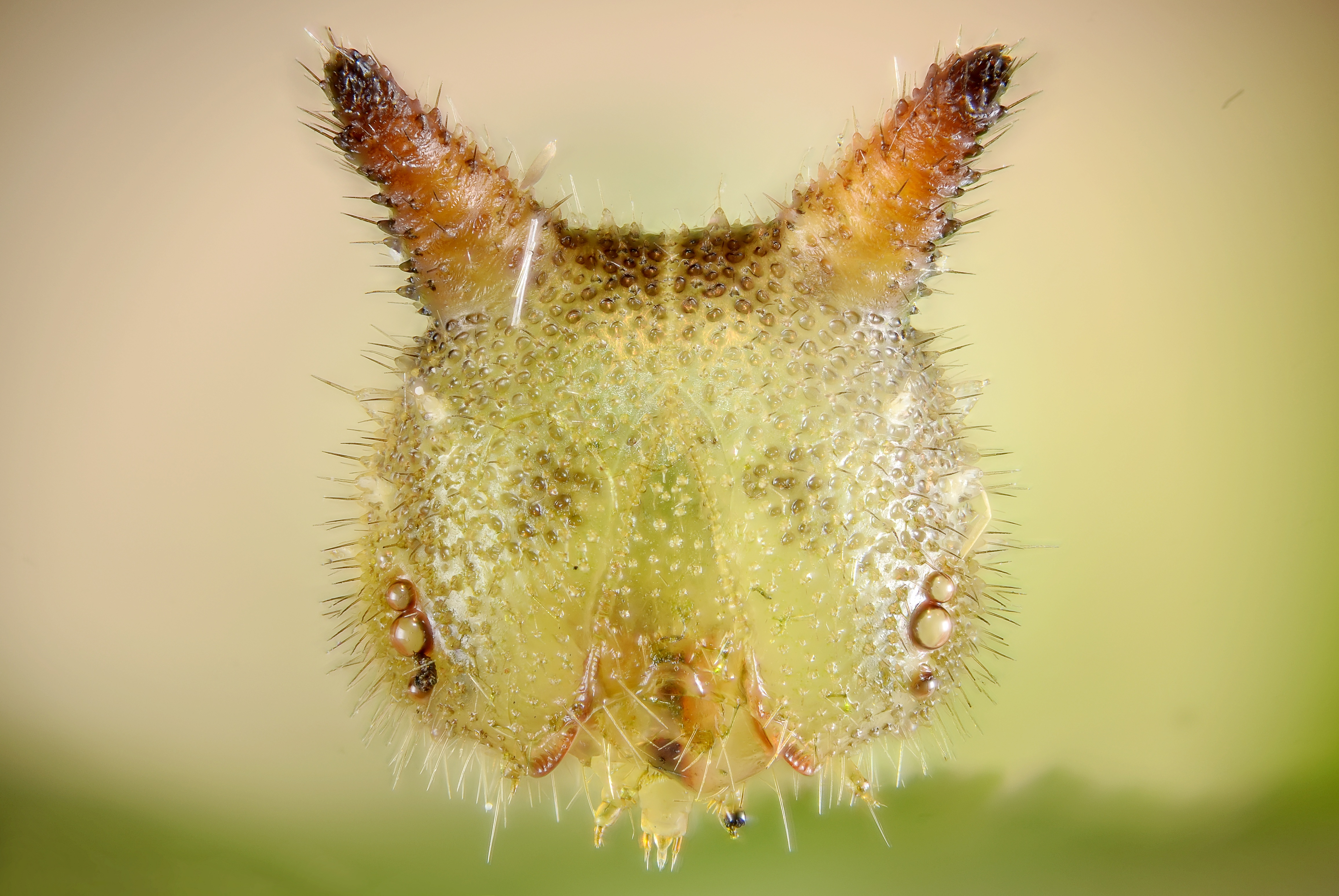
Head of the caterpillar

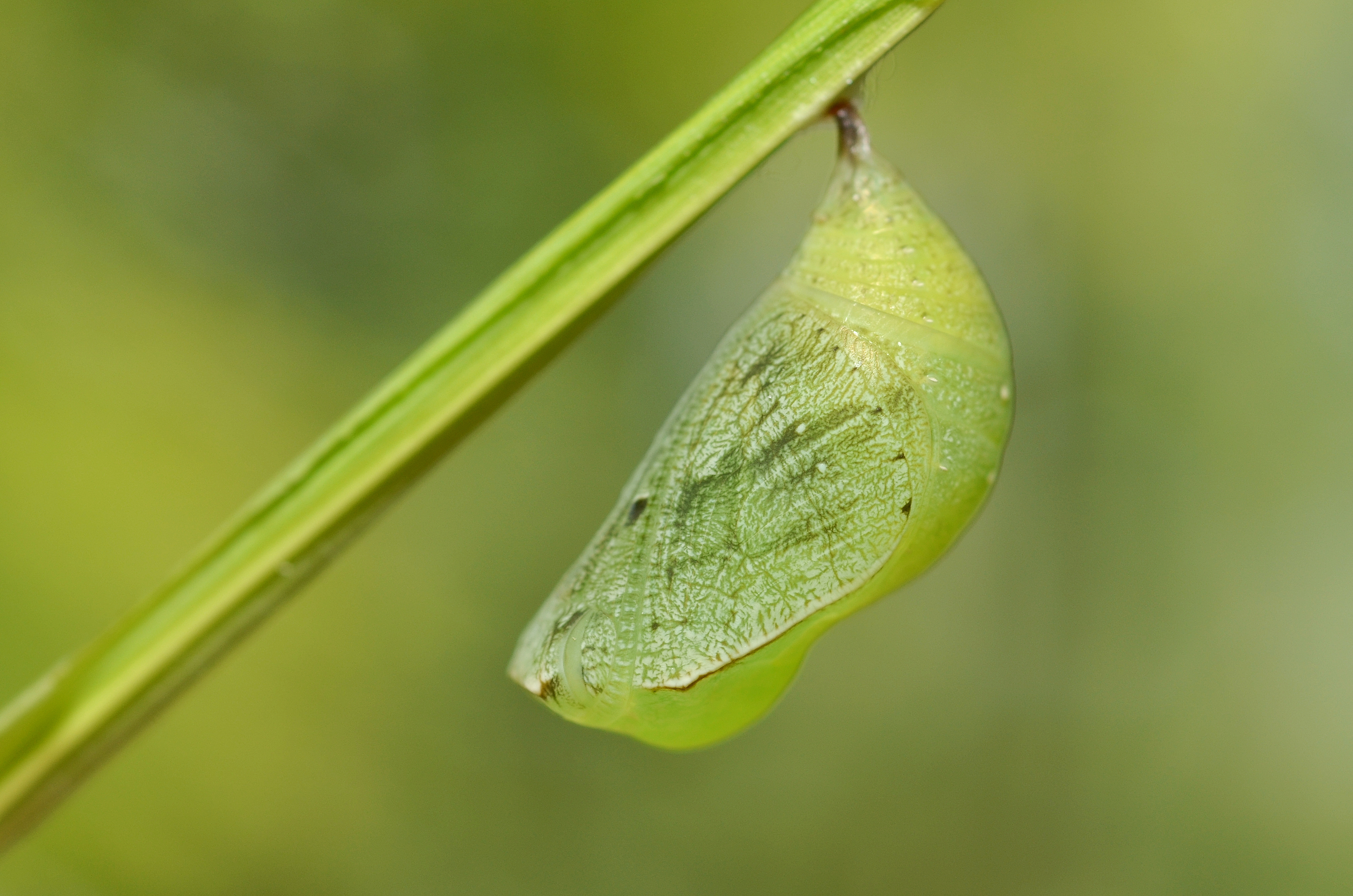
Chrysalis

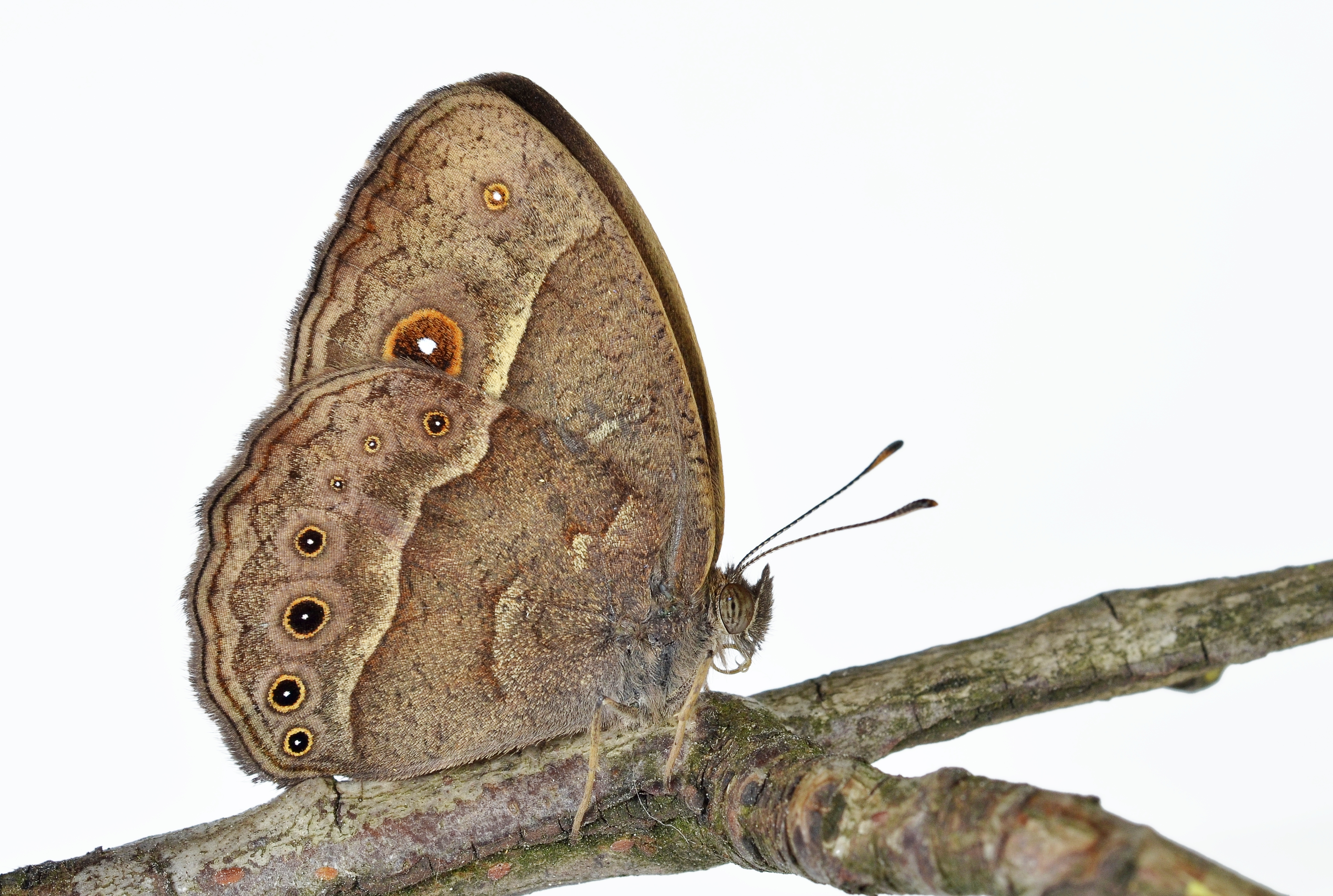
Adult from a lab strain

== Habitat and feeding ==
Squinting bush browns are normally woodland butterflies. They can be found flying close to the ground. They are primarily found in eastern parts of Africa, mainly in the countries of Uganda, Ethiopia, Kenya, Tanzania, Mozambique, and Zimbabwe. The larval diet consists of several species of grass and the adult butterflies feed on fruit that is on the ground. Species of butterflies that feed on fruit have been found to have the longest life spans. The butterflies feed on fruit as opposed to nectar simply as a matter of availability, but it has been discovered that butterflies feeding off of fruit had better offspring. When the butterflies are in the caterpillar stage, they can use several species of Poacae as larval host plants.

=== Mud puddling ===
The squinting bush brown has been known to participate in the phenomena of mud puddling. This is a specific type of feeding pattern where the butterfly will take up nutrients and sodium through the aggregating on the mud or dung. However, this behavior is only seen in males. Females that have mated with males who have been puddling experience no significant reproductive benefit due to their mate's puddling.

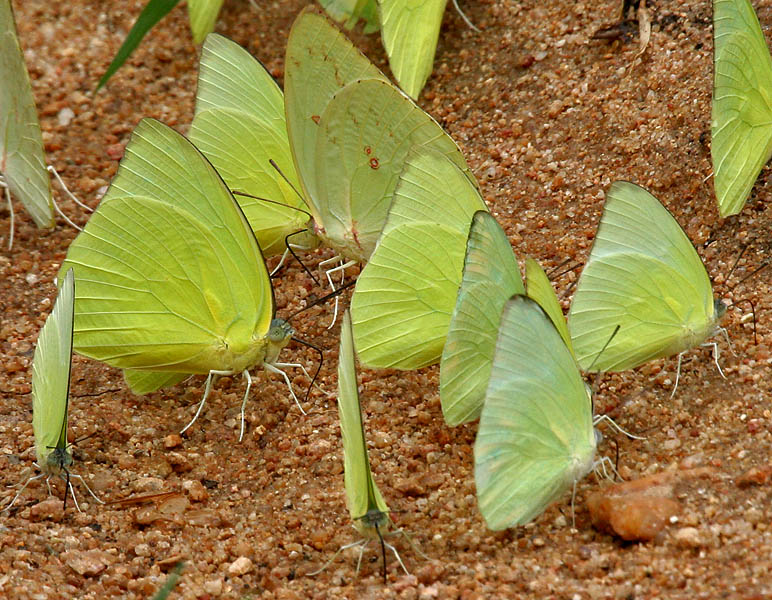
Common emigrant butterflies mud-puddling

== Mating ==
There are six steps that males take in order to mate with a female: location, orientation, flickering, thrust, attempting, and copulation. The males are able to attract the females with the numerous androconia located on their wings. These spots exude pheromones that attract female butterflies. The flickering of their wings helps spread their pheromones throughout the surrounding air. While mating, males present spermatophores to the females, which contain a wide variety of nutrients that augment the females' reproductive success.

It has also been discovered that adults during the wet season reproduce quickly while the dry season adults use resources geared towards prolonged survival. During the dry season, females are more likely to produce fewer but larger eggs. They have a higher parental investment in each offspring. This characteristic has made them vital in research on phenotypic plasticity.

=== Male courtship rate plasticity ===
Courtship rate plasticity is a change in the rate of stereotypical courtship behavior changes when faced with different environmental factors, such as temperature. Male courtship rates of the squinting bush brown butterfly exhibit a degree of plasticity. Studies have shown that these butterflies will change their courtship rate depending on temperatures throughout their larval stage into their adult stage.

Researchers investigated the critical period for courtship rate plasticity to determine whether or not it differed from the critical period for wing pattern plasticity, which had already been established as the final larval instar. In the squinting bush brown butterfly, high temperatures of around 27 degrees Celsius led to increased courtship by males, but low temperatures of 17 degrees Celsius led to males courting females at a much lower rate. This courtship rate plasticity of the butterflies demonstrates their active adaptation to the current environment.

This change in courtship rate, however, only occurs when the squinting bush brown butterfly is exposed to different temperatures at particular life stages: the temperature individuals experiences during their pupal stage and during adulthood changes male courtship rate while the temperature they experience during the larval stages has no effect. Researchers predict that temperature as an adult has an effect because behavioral plasticity extends throughout development into adulthood. An alternate hypothesis is that adults are affected by temperature as it impacts their movement; this would explain why this study found the same differences in courtship rate when comparing organisms that developed differently but had the same adult conditions.

Researchers at Yale University have discovered that the temperature at which the larvae are raised has an effect on the imago's sexual behaviour. Females raised in a cooler environment are more likely to actively court male butterflies. In a warmer environment, the male butterflies traditionally take on the active role in courtship.

=== Elder male preference ===
In the squinting bush brown butterfly, there has been a peculiar trend in terms of the mating males: older males seem to have a distinct mating advantage. There are two leading theories on why this may be happening. First older males may be more aggressive in mating, simply because they have a much more limited time in which they can mate. Also there may be preferential treatment of older males by female butterflies. The older males must have some good genes, because they were able to survive for this long, so females choose to mate with them to pass on the good genes to their offspring. In addition to both of these hypotheses, older males were found to have much larger spermatophores, allowing their sperm to outcompete younger male butterflies.

=== Inbreeding ===
Squinting bush browns are one of the first instances of insects severely affected by inbreeding. There is a large drop in the number of eggs that hatch when the butterflies interbreed. In addition to this the number of adults born from inbreeding have a high probability of being crippled and having low fecundity. Even though B. anynana suffers from inbreeding depression when forcibly inbred it recovers within a few generation when allowed to breed freely. Adult females do not innately avoid or learn to avoid siblings during mate selection, implying that detection may not be critical to reproductive fitness. Inbreeding may persist in B anynana because the likelihood of encountering relatives is rare in nature; that is movement ecology may mask the deleterious effect of inbreeding and relax selection for active inbreeding avoidance behaviors.

== Sex Determination System ==
Bush browns have a zygoticity based sex determination system. Females are heterozygotes (Z0) and homozygotes (ZZ) are male. Sex is determined by a single masculinising gene, BaMasc. However, males with two identical BaMasc alleles die as embryos, causing diversifying selection of the BaMasc alleles. In nature, this is rare, but it means captive populations are particularly susceptible to inbreeding depression.

== Eyespots ==
=== Mating ===
Females have also been known to choose a mate depending on their eyespots. In particular, on how large and bright the UV reflective pupils in their eyespots are. Pupils that are either too large or seem to be too small are selected against, in a process known as stabilizing selection. Researchers hypothesize that female selection rather than predator avoidance has accounted for this stabilizing effect.

=== Defense and predation ===
As is common with a wide variety of lepidopterans, eyespots located on the wings are a common defensive mechanism for the squinting bush brown. There are two predominant theories on why these eyespots have evolved. The first one is the large eyespots look similar to the eyes of predator's adversary. This temporarily surprises the predator allowing the butterfly to escape. A second potential benefit is that peripheral eye spots bring attention to non-essential body parts. The bird will be more likely to attack the wings, as opposed to the body. More often than not, if the first predator strike fails the butterfly will be likely to escape. These eyespots are most effective against the most common of the bush brown's predators, birds.

=== Phenotypic plasticity ===
In particular it has a seasonal variation in the size of its eyespots. During the African wet season, they have large apparent eye spots, whereas in the dry season, they have vastly reduced eye spots. Larvae growing in the dry season have characteristics of the wet season butterflies and larvae produced in the wet season have phenotypic traits resembling butterflies of the dry season. This adaptive strategy has evolved because it is better to be inconspicuous during the dry season. They can blend in with the brown surroundings. During the wet season, there is a large increase in vegetation, so the eyespots are useful in distracting predators.
