= Automimicry =

Mimicry of part of own body, e.g. the head

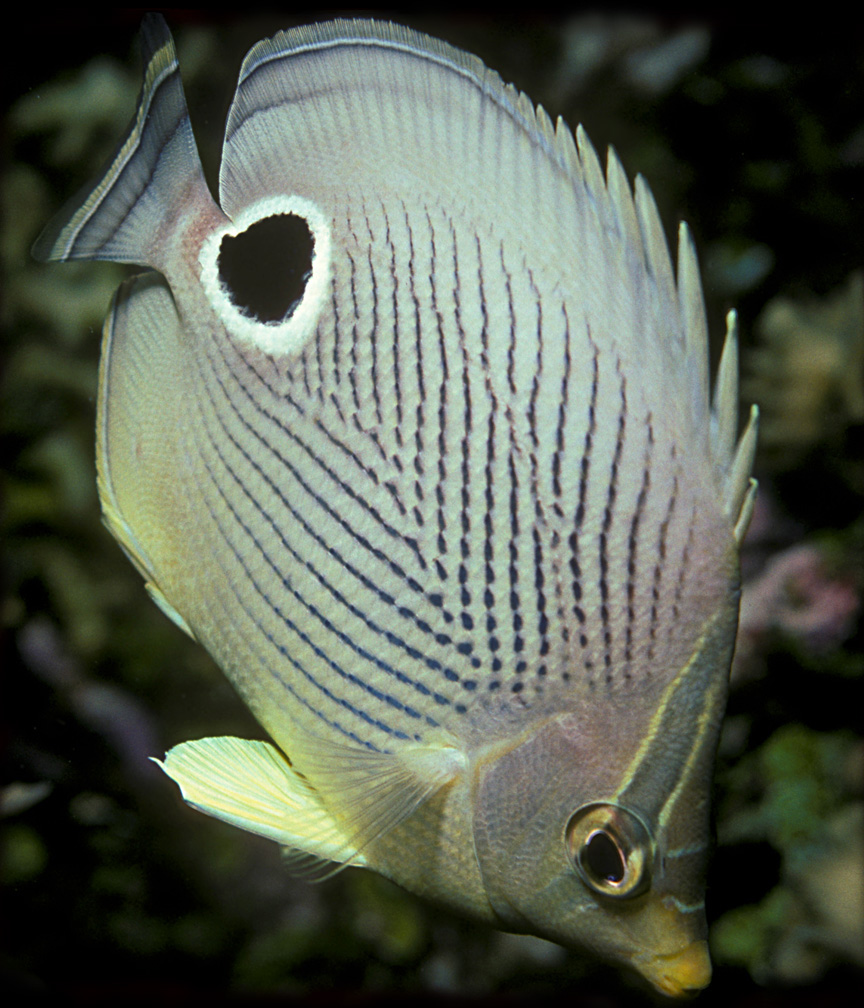
Eyespots of foureye butterflyfish (Chaetodon capistratus) mimic its own eyes, which are camouflaged with a disruptive eye mask, deflecting attacks from the vulnerable head.

In zoology, automimicry, Browerian mimicry, or intraspecific mimicry, is a form of mimicry in which the same species of animal is imitated. There are two different forms.

In one form, first described by Lincoln Brower in 1967, weakly-defended members of a species with warning coloration are parasitic on more strongly-defended members of their species, mimicking them to provide the negative reinforcement learning required for warning signals to function. The mechanism, analogous to Batesian mimicry, is found in insects such as the monarch butterfly.

In another form, first noted by Edward B. Poulton in 1890, a less vulnerable part of an animal's body resembles a more vulnerable part, for example with deceptive eyespots or a false head that deflects attacks away from the real head, providing an immediate selective advantage. The mechanism is found in both vertebrates such as fishes and snakes, and insects such as hairstreak butterflies.

Automimicry has sometimes been put to military use. The A-10 Thunderbolt II often had a false canopy painted on its underside to confuse enemies, while the armoured recovery vehicle variant of the Churchill tank had a dummy gun, imitating an armed variant of the same tank.

== Mimicry of distasteful members of the same species ==
Automimicry was first reported by the ecologist Lincoln Brower and colleagues, who found that monarch butterflies reared on cabbage were palatable to blue jays. However, monarchs raised on their natural host plant, milkweed, were noxious to jays - in fact, jays that ingested them vomited. Subsequently, Brower proposed the hypothesis of automimicry involving a polymorphism or spectrum of palatability: some individuals might be defended, and others palatable.

It turns out that many species of insects are toxic or distasteful when they have fed on plants that contain chemicals of particular classes, but not when they have fed on plants that lack those chemicals. For instance, some milkweed butterflies feed on milkweeds (Asclepias) which contain the cardiac glycoside oleandrin; this makes them poisonous to most predators. These insects are often aposematically coloured and patterned. When feeding on innocuous plants, they are harmless and nutritious, but a bird that has sampled a toxic specimen even once is unlikely to risk tasting harmless specimens with the same aposematic coloration. Such acquired toxicity is not limited to insects: many groups of animals have since been shown to obtain toxic compounds through their diets, making automimicry potentially widespread. Even if toxic compounds are produced by metabolic processes with an animal, there may still be variability in the amount that animals invest in them, so scope for automimicry remains even when dietary plasticity is not involved. Whatever the mechanism, palatability may vary with age, sex, or how recently they used their supply of toxin.

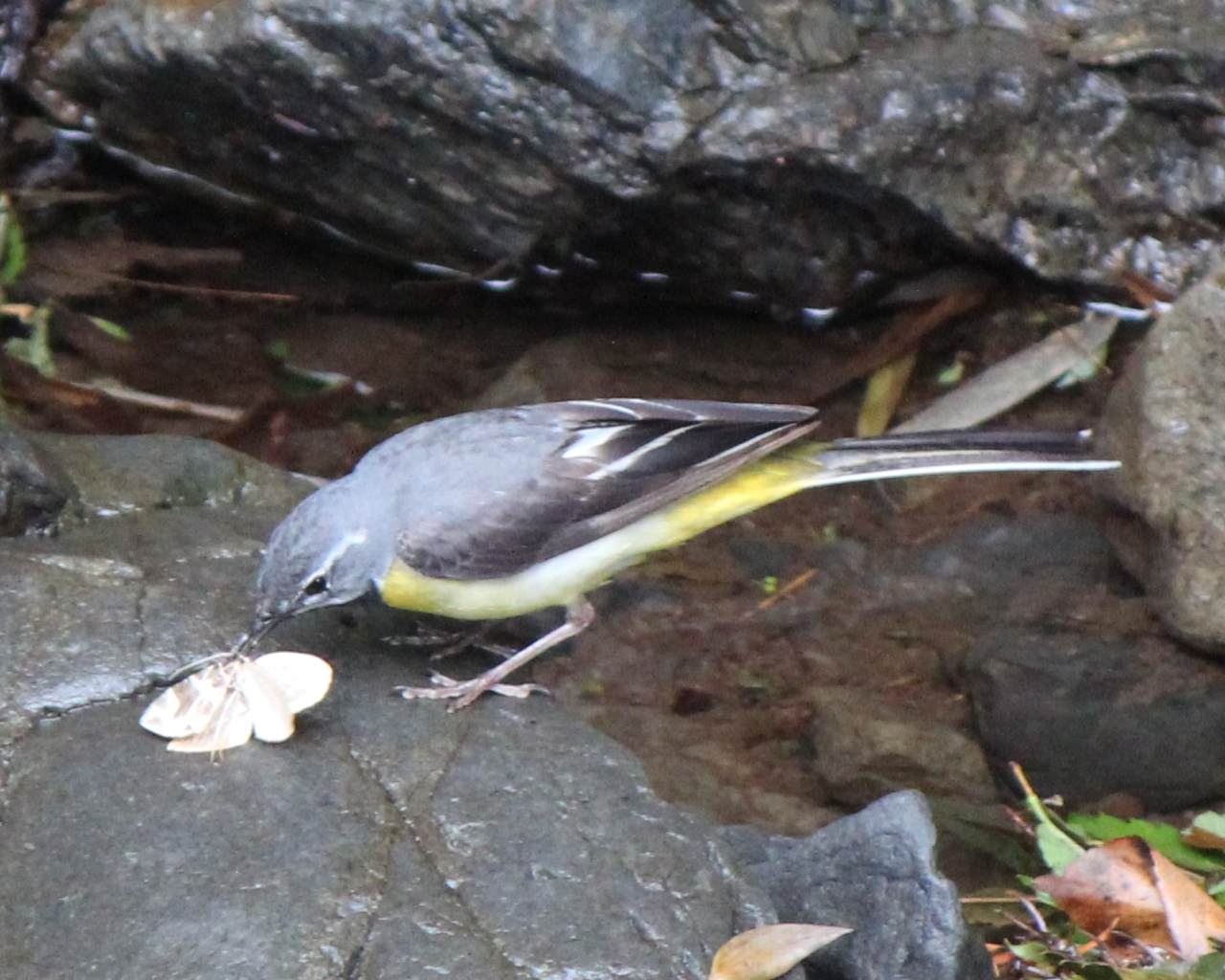
If insect-eating birds, like this wagtail eating a moth, tend to avoid, or to taste and spit out, toxic insects, then mimicry of distasteful forms by harmless morphs of the same species should be favoured.

The existence of automimicry in the form of non-toxic mimics of toxic members of the same species (analogous to Batesian mimicry) poses two challenges to evolutionary theory: how can automimicry be maintained, and how can it evolve? For the first question, as long as prey of the species are, on average, unprofitable for predators to attack, automimicry can persist. If this condition is not met, then the population of the species rapidly crashes. The second question is more difficult, and can also be rephrased as being about the mechanisms that keep warning signals honest. If signals were not honest, they would not be evolutionarily stable. If costs of using toxins for defence affects members of a species, then cheats might always have higher fitness than honest signallers defended by costly toxins. A variety of hypotheses have been put forth to explain signal honesty in aposematic species. First, toxins may not be costly. There is evidence that in some cases there is no cost, and that toxic compounds may actually be beneficial for purposes other than defence. If so, then automimics may simply be unlucky enough not to have gathered enough toxins from their environment. A second hypothesis for signal honesty is that there may be frequency-dependent advantages to automimicry. If predators switch between host plants that provide toxins and plants that do not, depending on the abundance of larvae on each type, then automimicry of toxic larvae by non-toxic larvae may be maintained in a balanced polymorphism. A third hypothesis is that automimics are more likely to die or to be injured by a predator's attack. If predators carefully sample their prey and spit out any that taste bad before doing significant damage ("go-slow" behaviour), then honest signallers would have an advantage over automimics that cheat.

== False head ==
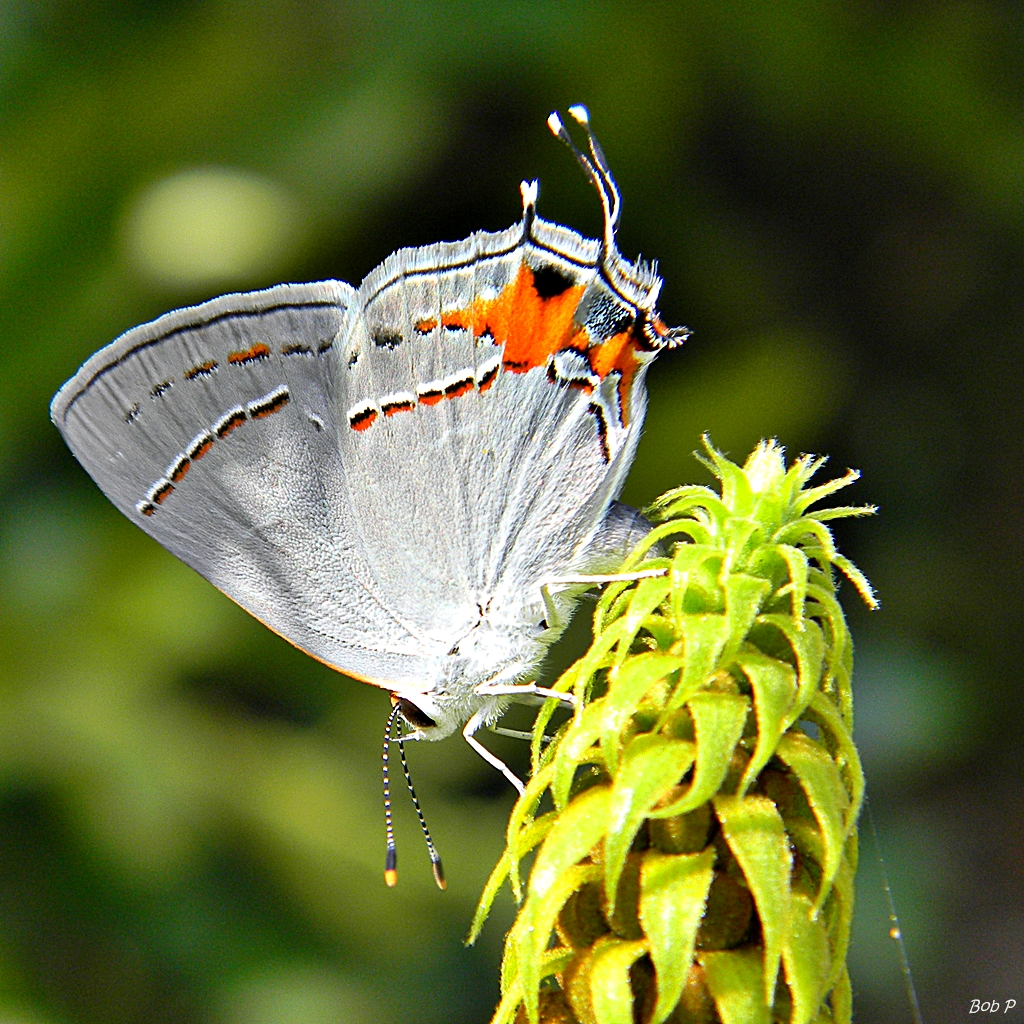
Many blue butterflies (Lycaenidae) such as this gray hairstreak (Strymon melinus) have a false head at the rear, held upwards at rest, deflecting attacks from the actual head.

Many insects have filamentous "tails" at the ends of their wings and patterns of markings on the wings themselves. These combine to create a "false head". This misdirects predators such as birds and jumping spiders (Salticidae). Spectacular examples occur in the hairstreak butterflies; when perching on a twig or flower, they commonly do so upside down and shift their rear wings repeatedly, causing antenna-like movements of the "tails" on their wings. Studies of rear-wing damage support the hypothesis that this strategy is effective in deflecting attacks from the insect's head.

Natural selection in favour of features that deflect predators' attacks is straightforward to explain: variants of patterns that more effectively deflect attack are favoured, since animals with ineffective variants are likely to be killed. Naturalists (Note: Including Swynnerton, 1926, and Blest, 1957.) since Edward B. Poulton in his 1890 book The Colours of Animals have noted that butterflies with eyespots or other false head markings can be expected to escape with minor wing damage while the predator gets only "a mouthful of hindwing" instead of an insect meal. In Poulton's words:

Each hind wing in these [hairstreak] butterflies is furnished with a 'tail', which in certain species is long, thin, and apparently knobbed at the end. When the butterfly is resting on a flower the wings are closed and the hind wings are kept in constant motion ... This movement, together with their appearance, causes the 'tails' to bear the strongest likeness to the antennae of a butterfly; the real antennae being held [downwards] so as not to attract attention. Close to the base of the supposed antennae an eye-like mark, in the most appropriate position, exists in many species. The effect of the marking and movement is to produce the deceptive appearance of a head at the wrong end of the body. The body is short and does not extend as far as the supposed head, so that the insect is uninjured when it is seized.

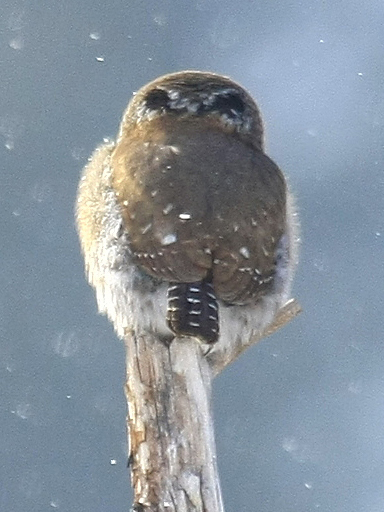
Pygmy owl (Glaucidium californicum) showing eyespots behind head

A 1981 experiment confirmed the expected correlation between deceptiveness and survival in butterflies.

Centipedes' last segments often mimic their heads by having a similar coloration and having the ultimate legs mimicking the antennae; this is thought to prevent predators from telling apart their heads, which have forcipules, from their arguably defenseless last trunk segments.

Among vertebrates, snakes such as the rubber boa and the coral snake coil up and hide their head, instead displaying their tail as a false head. Some fishes such as the foureye butterflyfish have eyespots near their tails, and when mildly alarmed swim slowly backwards, presenting the tail as a head; however, various hypotheses for the function of such eyespots have been proposed. Several species of pygmy owl bear false eyes (ocelli) on the back of the head, misleading predators into reacting as though they were the subject of an aggressive stare.

== Military usage ==
Automimicry has sometimes been used in military vehicles and aircraft. Among vehicles, the British Second World War Churchill armoured recovery vehicle had no room for an actual gun, but was fitted with a dummy weapon, imitating the armed version of the same tank, to give it some protection.

The ground attack A-10 Thunderbolt II l was sometimes painted with a camouflage scheme that included both disruptive coloration and automimicry in the form of a false canopy on the underside. This was intended to confuse the enemy about the aircraft's attitude and likely direction of travel.

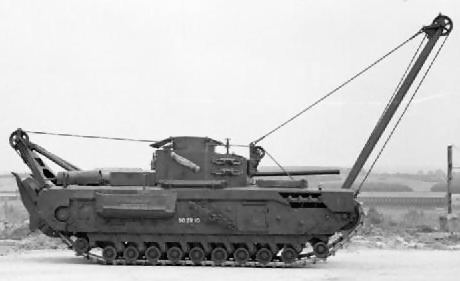
Armoured recovery vehicle variant of Churchill tank, with dummy gun, imitating an armed variant of the same tank

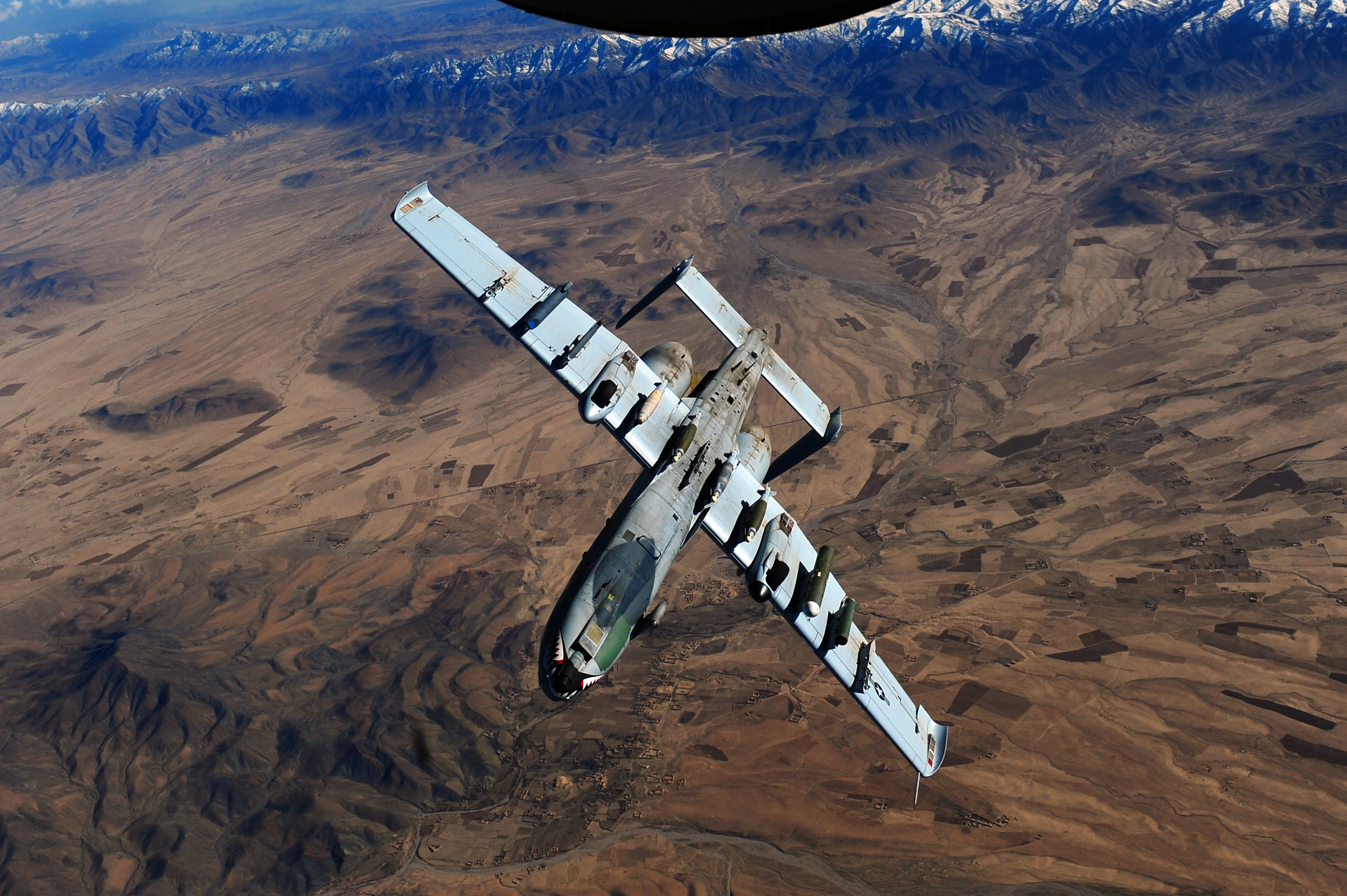
Underside of A-10 Thunderbolt II with false canopy painted in, as if the plane was the right way up, imitating itself
