= Eyespot (mimicry) =

Eye-like marking used for mimicry or distraction

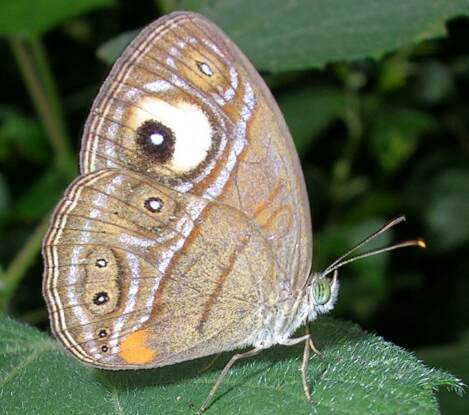
Many butterflies, such as this gladeye bushbrown (Mycalesis patnia), have eyespots on their wings.

An eyespot (sometimes ocellus) is an eye-like marking. They are found in butterflies, reptiles, cats, birds and fish.

Eyespots could be explained in at least three different ways. They may be a form of mimicry in which a spot on the body of an animal resembles an eye of a different animal, to deceive potential predator or prey species. They may be a form of self-mimicry, to draw a predator's attention away from the prey's most vulnerable body parts. Or they may serve to make the prey appear inedible or dangerous. Eyespot markings may play a role in intraspecies communication or courtship; a well-known example is the eyespots on a peacock's display feathers.

The pattern-forming biological process (morphogenesis) of eyespots in a wide variety of animals is controlled by a small number of genes active in embryonic development, including the genes called Engrailed, Distal-less, Hedgehog, Antennapedia, and the Notch signaling pathway.

Artificial eyespots have been shown to reduce predation of cattle by lions.

== Zoological distribution ==
=== In butterflies and moths ===
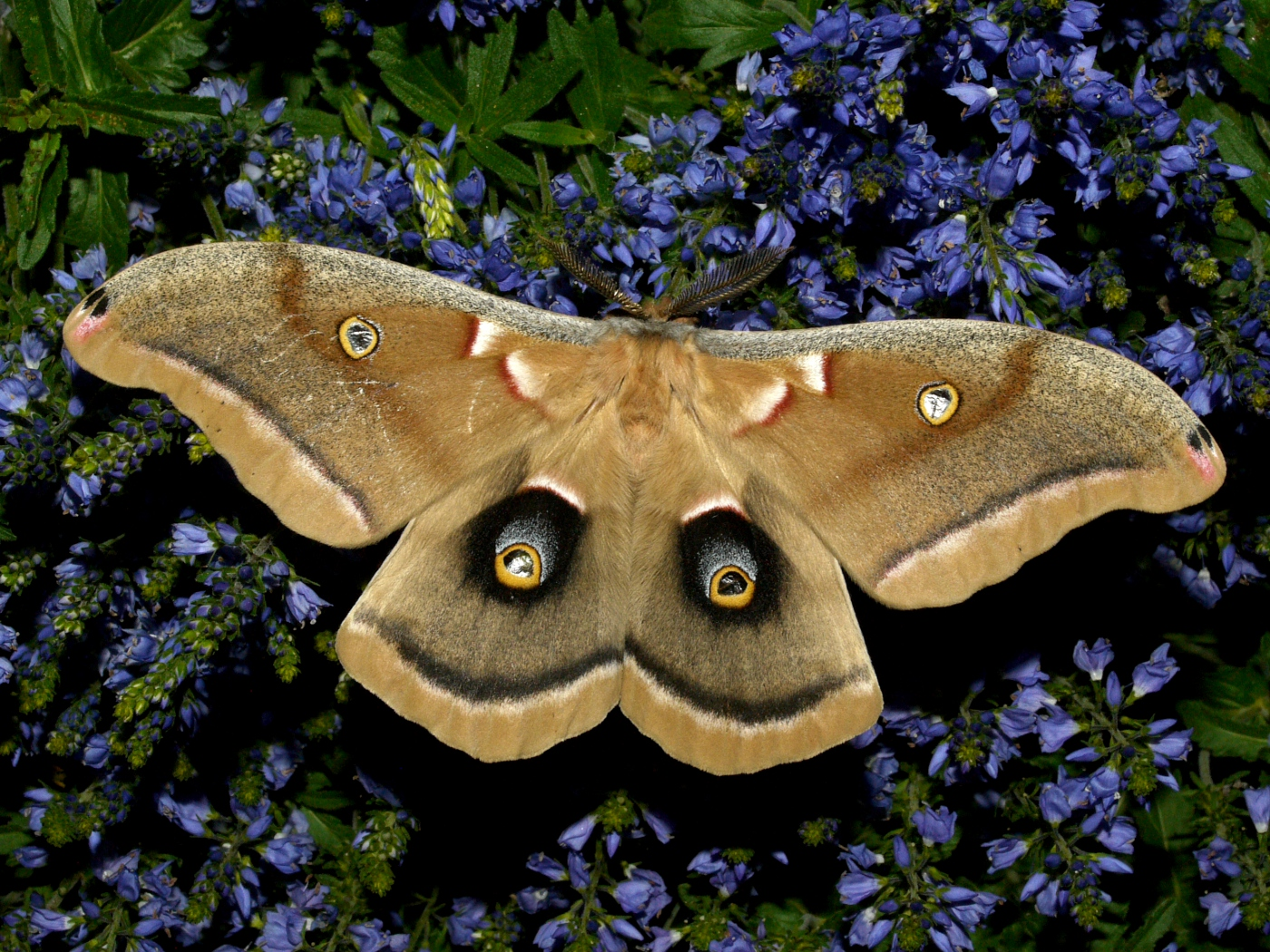
Polyphemus moth

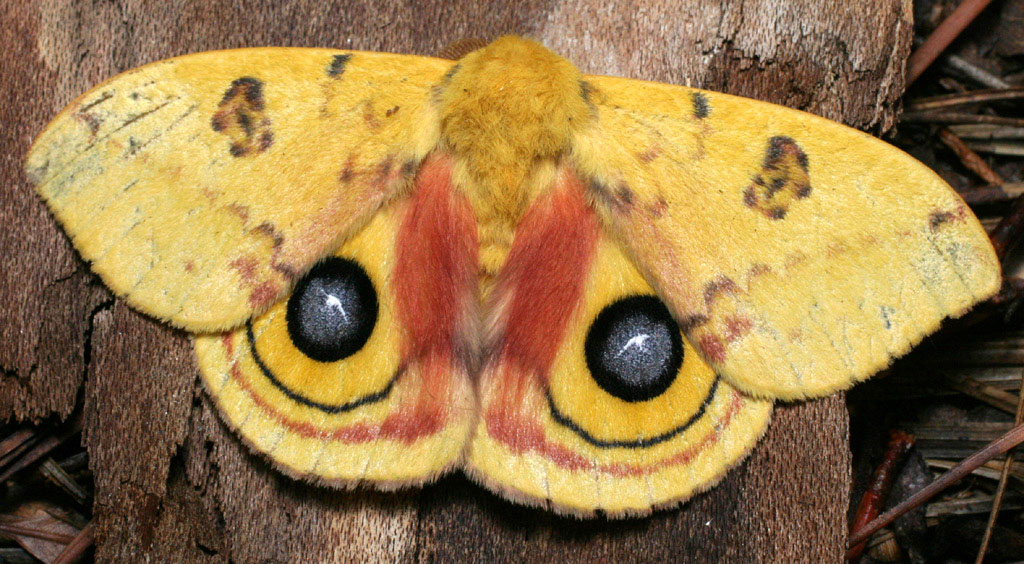
Io moth

The eye-like markings in some butterflies and moths and certain other insects, as well as birds like the sunbittern, serve functions in addition to mimicry; indeed, it is unclear whether they actually mimic eyes. There is evidence that eyespots in butterflies are antipredator adaptations, either in deimatic displays to intimidate predators, or to deflect attacks away from vital body parts. In species such as Hipparchia semele, the conspicuous eyespots are hidden at rest to decrease detectability, and only exposed when they believe potential predators are nearby. Butterfly eyespots can mimic dead leaves for camouflage from predators, as seen in Bicyclus anynana; this is a response to a seasonal fall in temperature, causing a shift in selection towards smaller, less conspicuous eyespots among those individuals developing at that time. Butterfly eyespots may play a role in mate recognition and sexual selection. Sexual selection drives the diversification of eyespots in different species of butterflies, as mates select for characteristics like size and brightness.

Some species of caterpillar, such as those of hawkmoths (Sphingidae), have eyespots on their anterior abdominal segments. When alarmed, they retract the head and the thoracic segments into the body, leaving the apparently threatening large eyes at the front of the visible part of the body.

Butterflies such as the blues (Lycaenidae) have filamentous "tails" at the ends of their wings and nearby patterns of markings, which combine to create a "false head". This automimicry misdirects predators such as birds and jumping spiders (Salticidae). Spectacular examples occur in the hairstreak butterflies; they commonly perch upside down with the false head raised and shift their rear wings repeatedly, causing antenna-like movements of the "tails" on their wings. Studies of rear-wing damage support the hypothesis that this deflects attacks from the insect's head.

=== In reptiles ===
Some reptiles, such as the sand lizard, have eyespots; in the sand lizard's case, there is a row of spots along the back, and a row on each side.

=== In mammals ===
Many species of Felidae, including Geoffroy's cats, jungle cats, pampas cats, and servals, have white markings, whether spots or bars, on the backs of their ears; it is possible that these signal "follow me" to the young of the species. There may be an evolutionary trade-off in this case between nocturnal camouflage and intraspecific signaling.

=== In birds ===
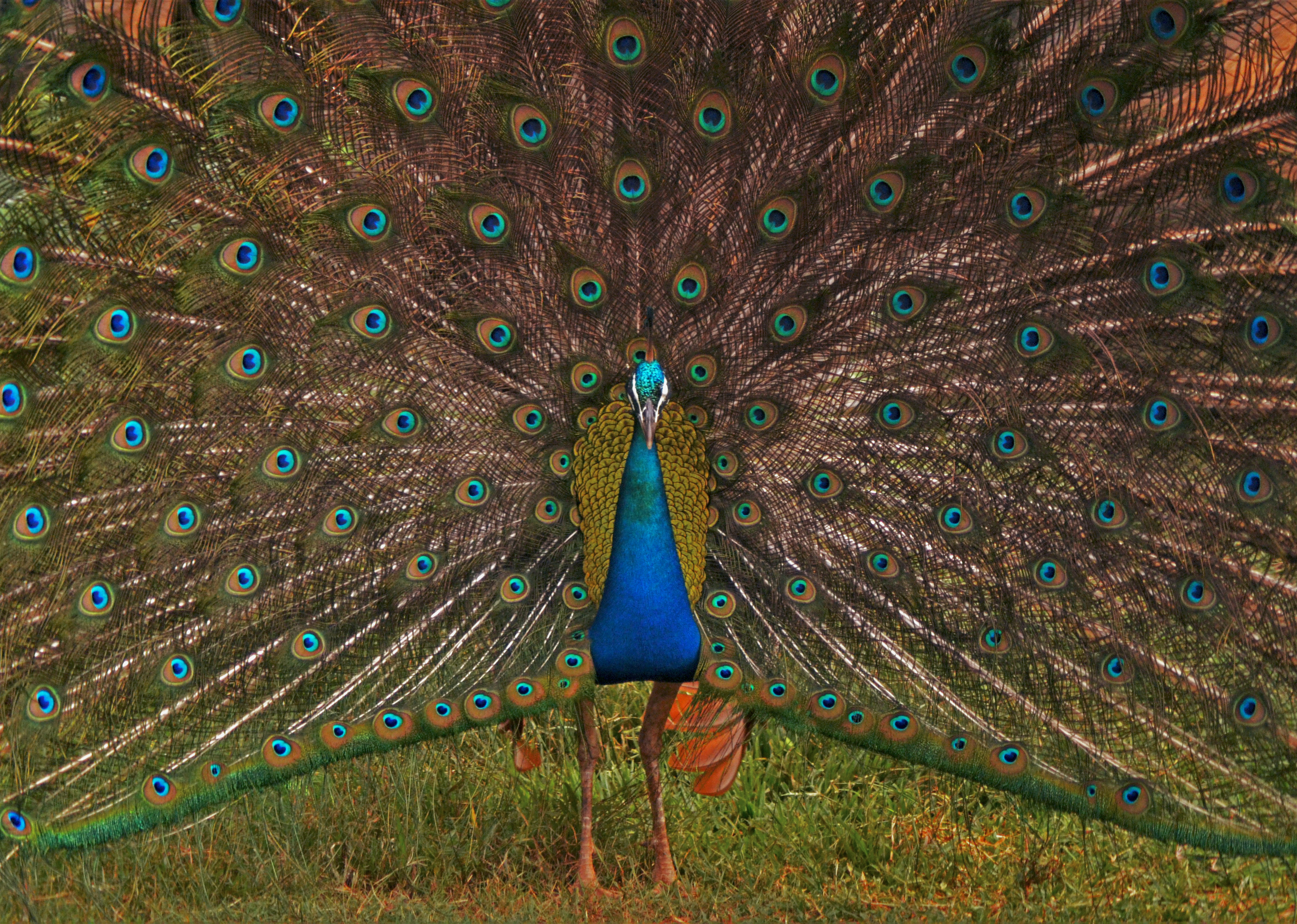
Indian peafowl display

Male birds of some species, such as the peacock, have conspicuous eyespots in their plumage, used to signal their quality to sexually selecting females. The number of eyespots in a peacock's train predicts his mating success; when a peacock's train is experimentally pruned, females lose interest. Several species of pygmy owl bear false eyes on the back of the head, misleading predators into reacting as though they were the subject of an aggressive stare.

=== In fish ===
Some fish have eyespots. The foureye butterflyfish gets its name from a large and conspicuous eyespot on each side of the body near the tail. A black vertical bar on the head runs through the true eye, making it hard to see. This may deceive predators in two ways: into attacking the tail rather than the more vulnerable head, and about the fish's likely direction of travel. The foureye butterflyfish eyespot is thus an example of self-mimicry. For the same reason, many juvenile fish display eyespots that disappear during their adult phase. Some species of fish, like the spotted mandarin fish and spotted ray, maintain their eyespots throughout their adult lives. These eyespots can take a form very similar to those seen in most butterflies, with a focus surrounded by concentric rings of other pigmentation.

=== Gallery ===
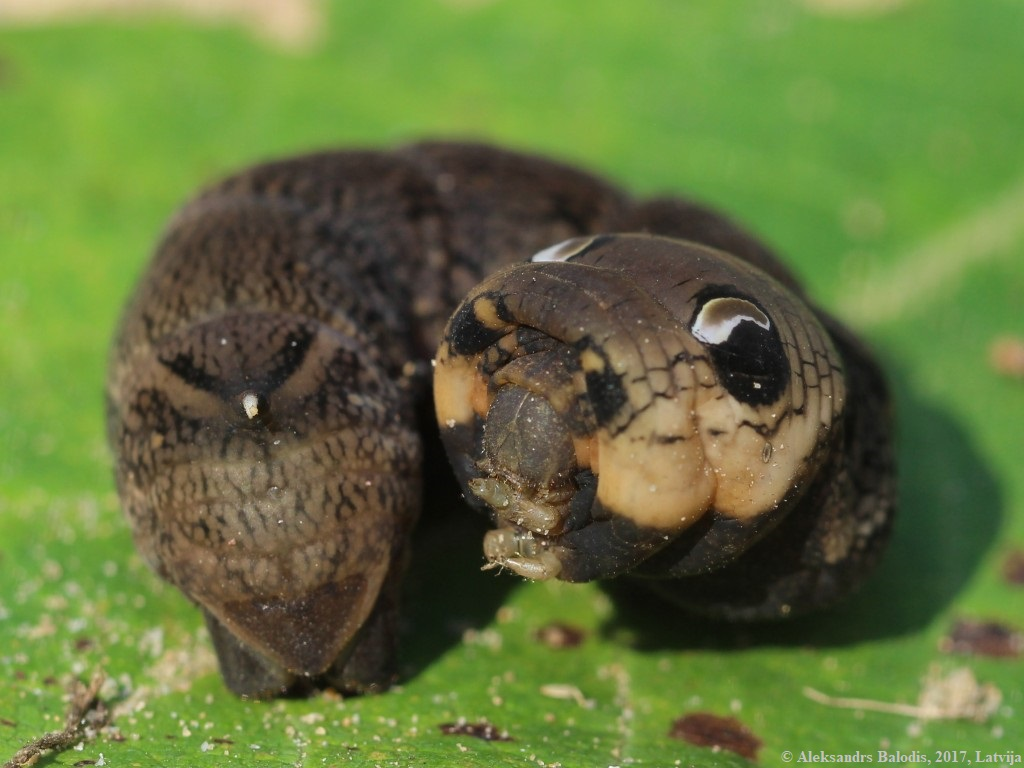
Larva of elephant hawkmoth (Deilephila elpenor) displaying eyespots when alarmed

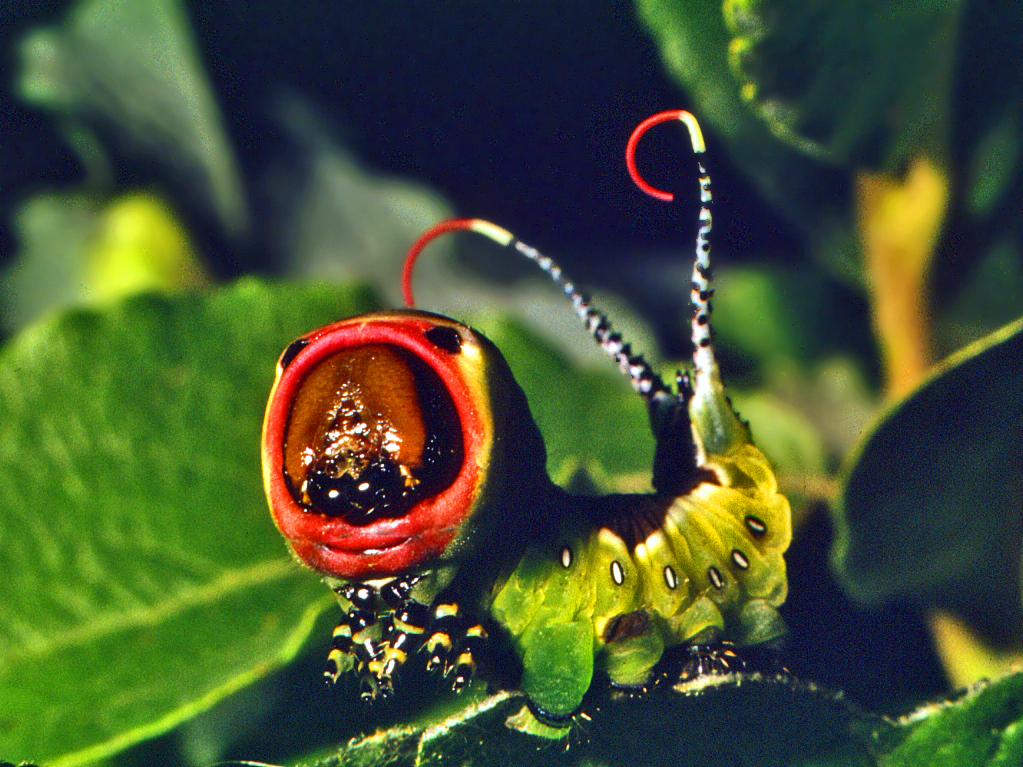
Larva of puss moth (Cerura vinula) in a defensive posture, with black eyespots visible just above its head

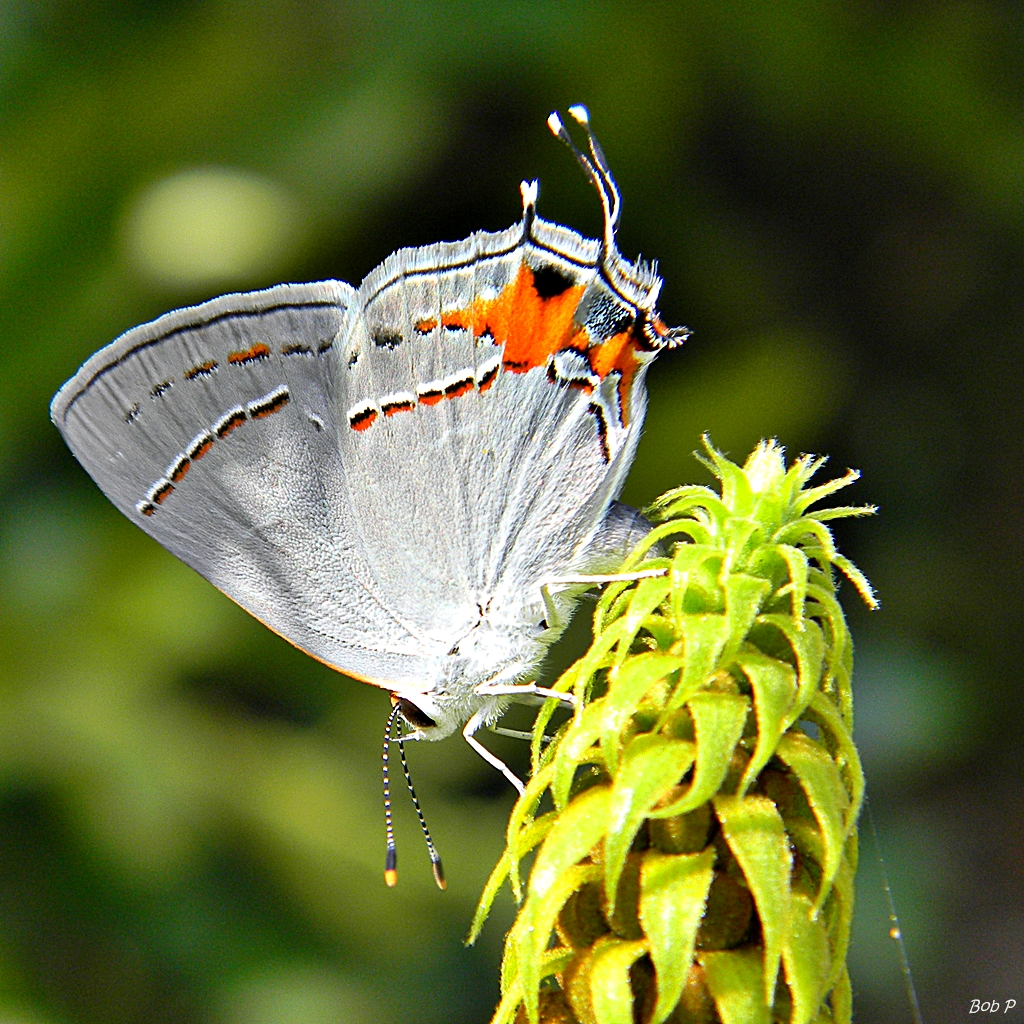
Automimicry: gray hairstreak (Strymon melinus) has false head at rear

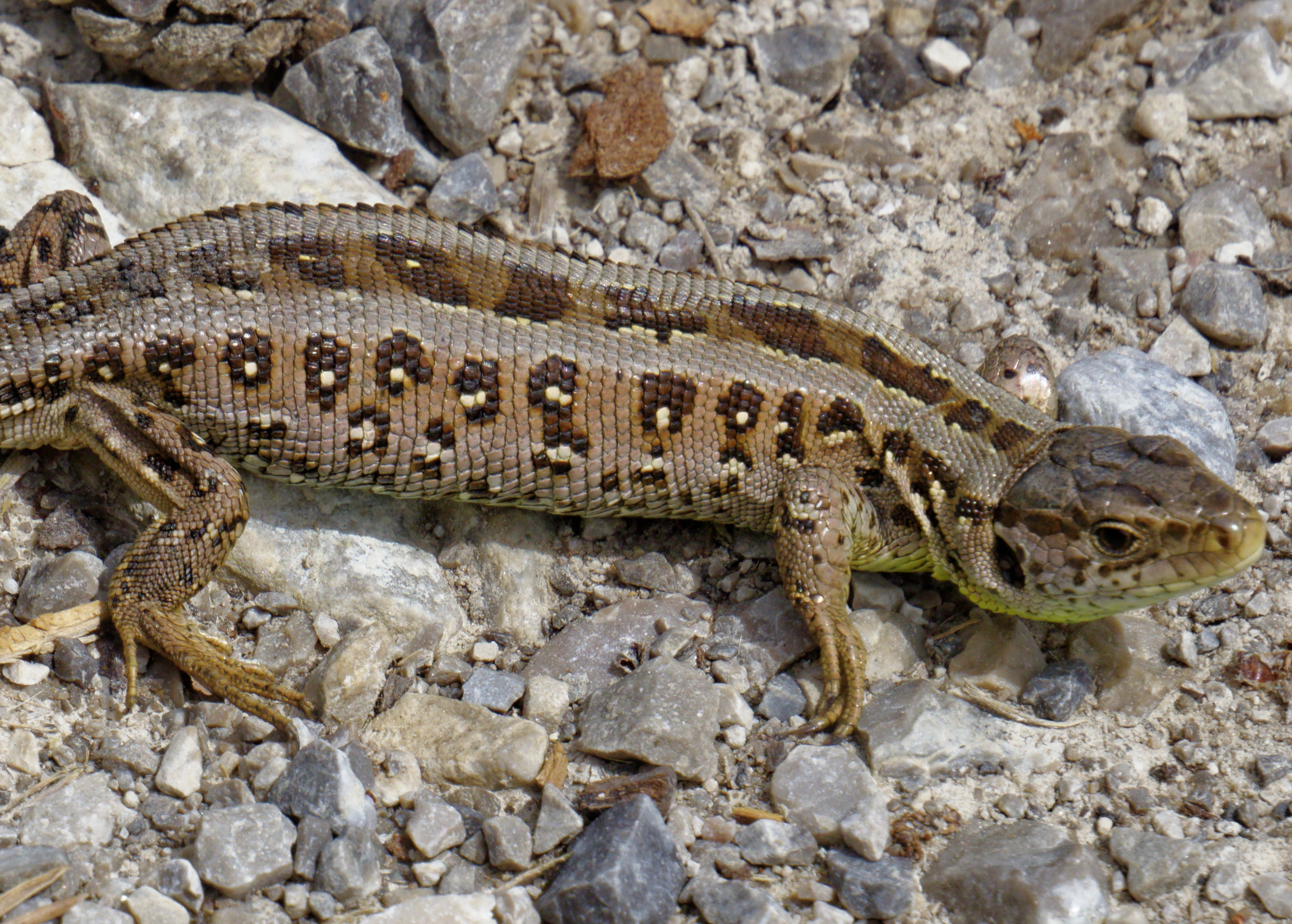
Sand lizard (Lacerta agilis) with rows of eyespots

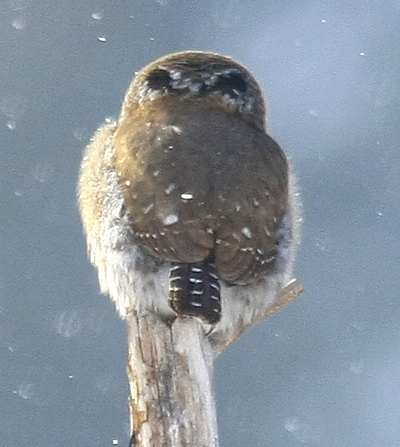
Pygmy owl (Glaucidium californicum) with eyespots behind head

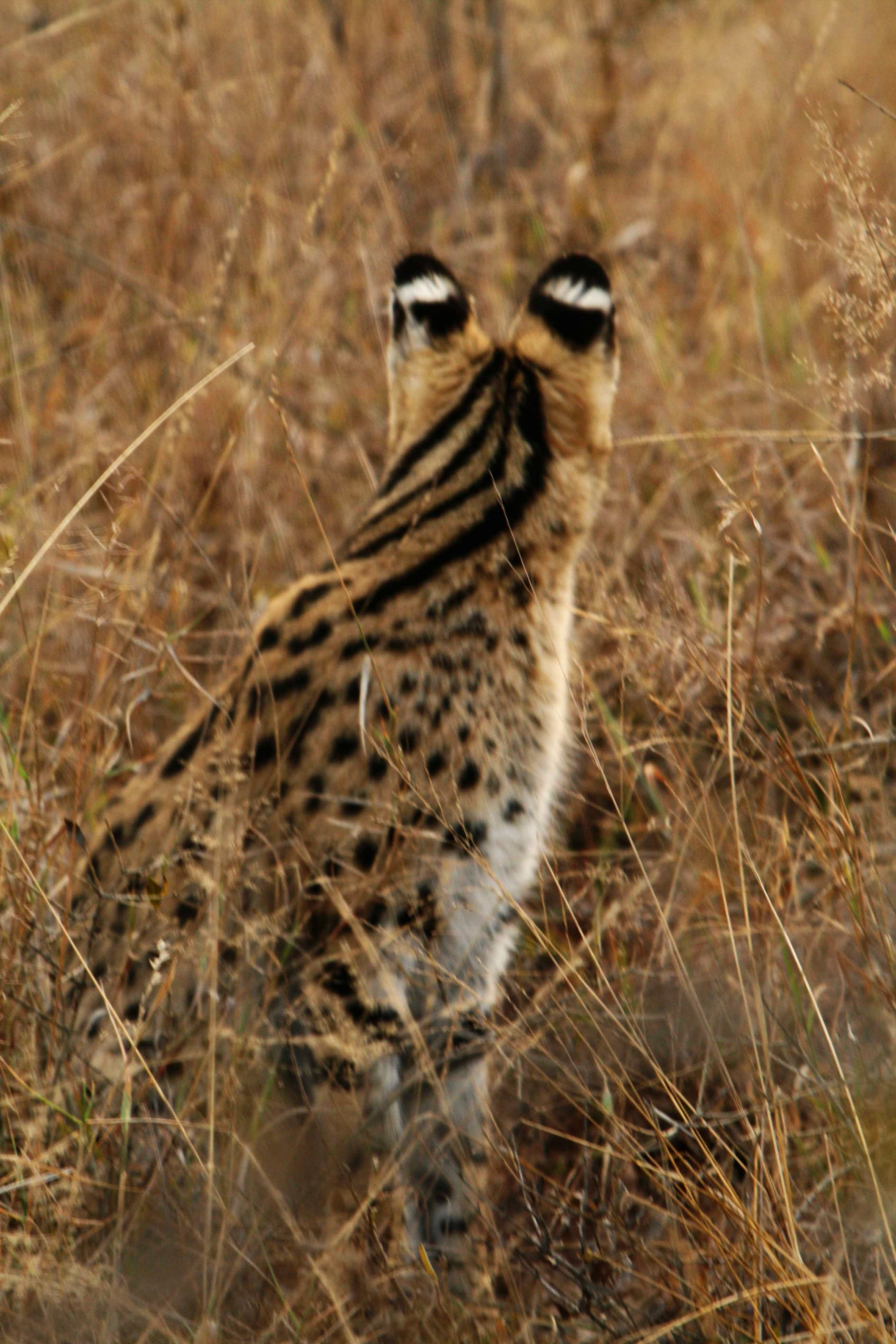
Serval (Leptailurus serval) from back, ocelli clearly visible on the ears

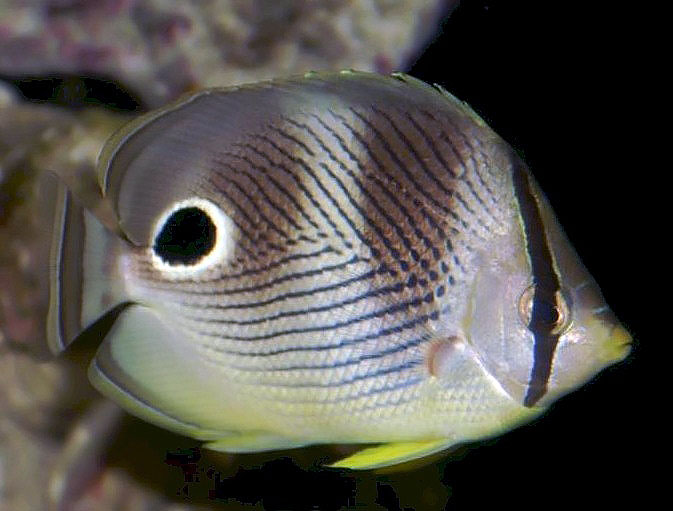
Foureye butterflyfish (Chaetodon capistratus) has false eyes near tail and disruptive eye mask concealing eye

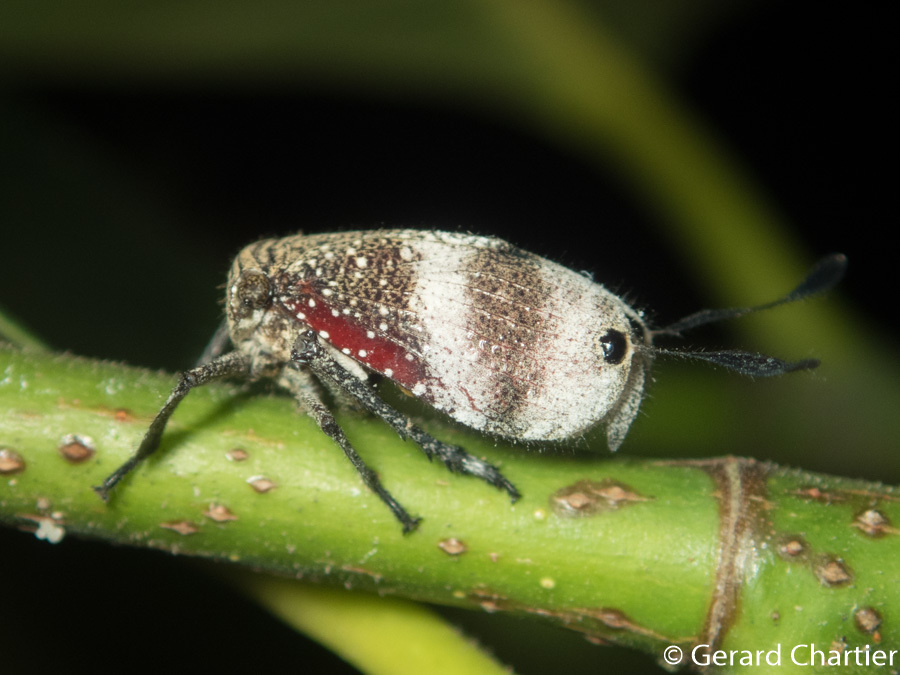
Eurybrachid planthopper (Ancyra sp.) has false head and antennae at rear

== Morphogenesis ==
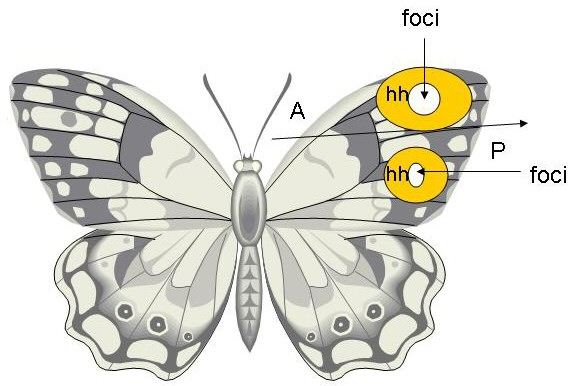
Plan of a typical butterfly, showing the morphogenetic foci on the wings that create eyespots

Butterfly eyespots are formed during embryogenesis as a result of a morphogenetic signalling center or organizer, called the focus. This induces neighboring cells to produce specific pigments which pattern the eyespot.

Early experiments on eyespot morphogenesis used cautery on the butterfly wing eyespot foci to demonstrate that a long range signalling mechanism or morphogen gradient controlled the formation of eyespots in both space and time. The findings cannot be explained by a simple source/diffusion model, but could be explained by either a source/threshold model, in which the focus creates the morphogen, or by the sink model, in which the focus generates a gradient by removing a morphogen which was created elsewhere. Several genes involved in eyespot formation have been identified that can fit into these models, but only two of them have been functionally tested. These genes are the transcription factor Distalless (Dll) and the ligand (a signalling substance that binds a cell surface receptor) Hedgehog (Hh).

Butterfly eyespot morphology appears to be the result of the evolution of an altered version of the regulatory circuit which patterns the wings of other insects. This rogue regulatory circuit is able to pattern both the anterior and posterior eyespots independent of the usual anterior/posterior wing compartmentalization restrictions seen in the fruit fly Drosophila. The altered regulatory circuit redeploys early developmental signalling sources, like the canonical hedgehog (Hh) pathway, Distal-less (Dll), and engrailed (En), breaking the anterior/posterior compartmentalization restrictions through increased localized levels of Hh signalling. In turn, this raises expression of its receptor Patched (Ptc) and transcription factor. Normally, in Drosophila, engrailed acts in the posterior compartment to restrict Ptc and Cubitus interruptus (Ci) expression to the anterior compartment by repressing transcription of Ci, thereby preventing Ptc expression. From the perspective of evolutionary developmental biology, understanding the redeployment and plasticity of existing regulatory mechanisms in butterfly eyespot locus development has given more insight into a fundamental mechanism for the evolution of novel structures.

=== Distal-less ===
The Distal-less gene is present in almost all eyespot organizers, making it an ideal candidate to carry out major functions of eyespot formation. During the wing imaginal disc development Dll, has two expression domains separated by a temporal component. First Dll is expressed in a group of cells in the center of what will become the focus and eventually the eyespot. This expression starts during the middle of the fifth instar larva and lasts until the pupal stage. The second domain starts around 20 hours after pupation around the original central cluster of cells, in an area in which a black ring of the eyespot will be formed. Functional experiments using transgenic Bicyclus anynana (the squinting bush brown butterfly) have shown that overexpression or down-regulation of Dll in the first expression domain correlates with bigger and smaller eyespots respectively. However, if this is done on the second domain then the overall size of the eyespots remains the same, but the width of the black ring raises with a higher amount of Dll. This suggests that Dll might be responsible for the differentiation of the focus in the first expression domain and might be involved in establishing the ring color patterns in the second domain. These experiments together with the wide distribution of Dll across eyespot forming butterflies suggest that this transcription factor is a central regulator for the correct patterning of the eyespots.

=== Hedgehog ===
The Hedgehog (Hh) gene is the other element that has been functionally tested in the formation of eyespots. Investigating genes involved in wing development and morphogenetic activity has led to the discovery that Hh has a primary role in the morphogenetic signalling center of the foci. In a manner that is similar to the development of Drosophila fruit flies, Hh is expressed in all cells in the posterior compartment of the developing butterfly wing during the mid fifth instar of butterfly wing development. However, in butterflies, Hh expression is significantly higher in those cells that flank the potential foci. Higher transcription levels of Hh, along with other known associates of the Hh pathway, namely patched (Ptc) the Hh receptor, and cubitus interruptus (Ci), the Hh transcription factor is seen throughout the mid to late fifth instar as well, which further implies a role for Hh signalling in eyespot development and patterning.

Furthermore, cells that are flanked by the cells expressing the highest level of Hh signalling are fated to become the foci, indicating that focus cell fate determination relies on high concentrations of Hh in surrounding cells. However, this observation has not been totally confirmed as a rule for multiple butterfly species. Studies tried to extrapolate the result of Hh pathway involvement by looking for the expression of Ci in Bicyclus anynana. Here they observed that both seem to be expressed in eyespots, suggesting a relation with the Hh signalling pathway. However, other studies did not find evidence of Hh expression in B. anynana.

=== Notch ===
The Notch (N) gene expression precedes an upregulation of Dll in the cells that will become the center of the focus. This makes N the earliest developmental signal, so far studied, that is related with the establishment of the eyespots. Loss of N completely disrupts Dll expression, and eventually eyespot formation, in several butterfly species. A variety of other wing patterns are determined by N and Dll patterns of expression in early development of the wing imaginal disc, suggesting that a single mechanism patterns multiple coloration structures of the wing.

== Evolution ==
Butterfly eyespots are formed by an interplay of at least 3 genes, namely Distal-less (Dll), spalt (sal), and Antennapedia (Antp), hence their evolution has been shaped by differential expression of these genes in different butterfly taxa, as shown in Bicyclus anynana.

== Artificial eyespots ==
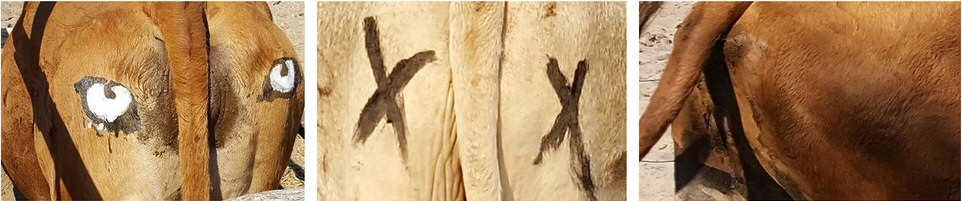
Eyespot experiment on cattle in Botswana. Both the eyespots (left) and the cross markings (centre) protected the cattle from predation by lions, compared to the unmarked controls (right).

Eyespots painted on the rumps of cows have been shown to reduce cattle predation in Africa. The study authors, Cameron Radford and colleagues, note that in the Sundarbans, forest users wear face masks with eye markings on the backs of their heads in the hope of reducing tiger attacks. In the study on 2061 cattle in 14 herds over 4 years, 683 were given eye markings, 543 were painted with crosses, and 835 were unpainted. None of the eyed cattle were predated, but 4 cross-marked and 15 unmarked cattle were killed, one by a leopard, the rest by lions. Both the eyespots and the cross markings provided statistically significant protection. The cattle were always in mixed groups of marked and unmarked animals; it is not known whether marking all animals in a herd would provide effective protection.

== See also ==
- Animal colouration
- Nazar (amulet)
- Patterns in nature
