= Deception in animals =

Deception by non-human animals

Deception in animals is the voluntary or involuntary transmission of misinformation by one animal to another, of the same or different species, in a way that misleads the other animal. The psychology scholar Robert Mitchell identifies four levels of deception in animals. At the first level, as with protective mimicry like false eyespots and camouflage, the action or display is inbuilt. At the second level, an animal performs a programmed act of behaviour, as when a prey animal feigns death to avoid being eaten. At the third level, the deceptive behaviour is at least partially learnt, as when a bird puts on a distraction display, feigning injury to lure a predator away from a nest. Fourth level deception involves recognition of the other animal's beliefs, as when a chimpanzee tactically misleads other chimpanzees to prevent their discovering a food source.

== Definitions ==
=== True deception ===
Some types of deception in animals are completely involuntary (e.g. disruptive colouration), but others are under voluntary control and may involve an element of learning. Most instances of voluntary deception in animals involve a simple behaviour, such as a cat arching its back and raising its hackles, to make itself appear larger than normal when attacked. There are relatively few examples of animal behaviour which might be attributed to the manipulative type of deception that occurs in humans, i.e. "tactical deception". It has been argued that true deception assumes the deceiver knows that (1) other animals have minds, (2) different animals' minds can believe different things are true (when only one of these is actually true), and (3) it can make another mind believe that something false is actually true. True deception requires the deceiver to have the mental capacity to assess different representations of reality. Animal behaviour scientists are therefore wary of interpreting a single instance of behaviour as true deception, and explain it with simpler mental processes such as learned associations. In contrast, human activities such as military deception are certainly intentional, even when they involve methods such as camouflage which physically parallel camouflage methods used by animals.

=== Levels ===
Robert Mitchell lists four levels of deception in animals:

1. First-level deception: an animal acts because it cannot do otherwise, it is programmed to deceive in a certain way. For example, false eyespots such as butterfly markings that indicate their heads are at the back end of their bodies as an aid to escape, or markings to make predators appear safe
2. Second-level deception: a programmed act of behaviour when another organism is registered. Examples include a predator acting in a way to hide its predatory nature around prey
3. Third-level deception: involves learning, and is based upon trial and error. An example is feigned injury to get or divert attention; for example, a parent mockingbird feigning an injury to attract a predator away from its defenceless offspring
4. Fourth-level deception: includes recognition of other animals' beliefs, i.e., second-order thinking. This can be verbal deception such as a chimp misleading other chimps to hide a food source.

All four levels are found in nature, including bacteria and plants, but the third and fourth levels seem to be exclusive to animals.

== First-level deception: mimicry and camouflage ==
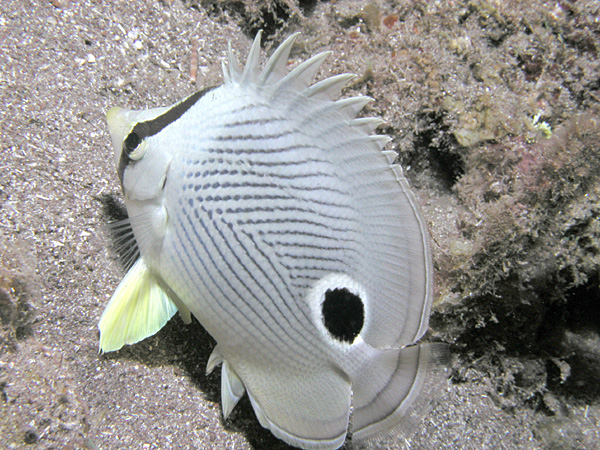
The four-eye butterflyfish conceals its eyes using a disruptive eye mask, a type of camouflage, and displays false eyespots that mimic its eyes near its tail.

At the first level, an animal acts because it cannot do otherwise, it is programmed to deceive in a certain way. For example, false eyespots such as butterfly markings that indicate their heads are at the back end of their bodies as an aid to escape.

=== Mimicry ===
Mimicry is a resemblance of one species to another which protects one or both species. The resemblance can be in visual appearance, behaviour, sound, and scent. There are many types, which can be combined. Defensive or protective mimicry enables organisms to avoid harmful encounters by appearing to their enemies to be something that they are not. For example, mantis shrimps spread their powerful front limbs to threaten rivals. Newly moulted mantis shrimps frequently deceive competitors in this way, even though their still-soft exoskeletons mean that they could not fight without damaging themselves.

In aggressive mimicry, predators or parasites resemble harmless species, allowing them to approach or to attract prey. Anglerfish have a long filament (the illicium) sprouting from the middle of the head above the eyes and terminating in an irregular growth of flesh (the esca). The esca can be wiggled to resemble a small worm, luring other predators close enough for the anglerfish to devour them. Among fireflies, males are lured toward what seems to be a sexually receptive female, only to be eaten. Photuris females emit flashes that resemble the mating signals of females of the genus Photinus. Male fireflies from several different genera are attracted to these "femmes fatales", as the predatory females can identify the male's species and emit the appropriate signals.

In automimicry, one body part of an animal mimics another. This may help an animal to survive an attack, or help predators to appear innocuous. Examples include the eyespots of moths, butterflies, and fishes. These are large dark markings that help prey escape by causing predators to attack a false target. For example, the gray hairstreak (Strymon melinus) shows a false head at the rear of its wings; it has a better chance of surviving an attack to that non-critical part than an attack to the head.

=== Camouflage ===
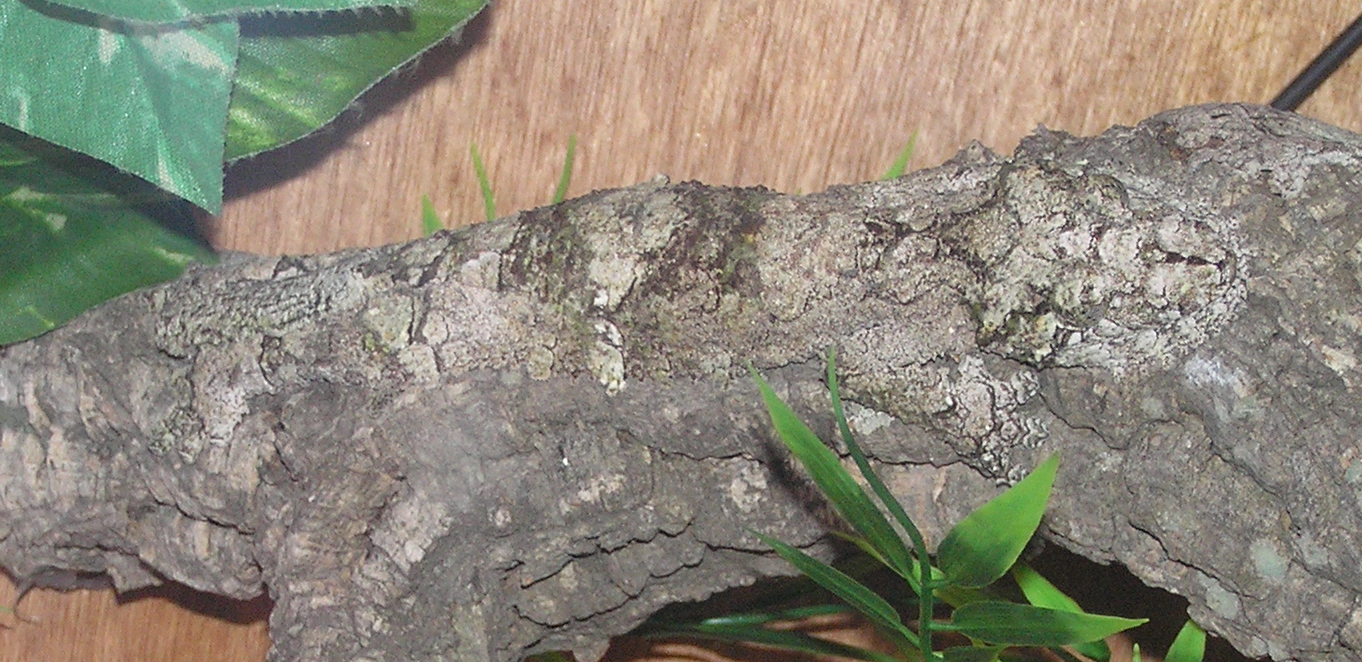
Uroplatus gecko relies on multiple methods of camouflage, including disruptive coloration, eliminating shadow, and cryptic behaviour (lying low and keeping still).

Camouflage is the use of any combination of materials, coloration, or behaviour that helps to conceal an animal by making it hard to see (crypsis) or by disguising it as something else (mimesis). There are many methods of achieving crypsis. These include, resemblance to the surroundings, disruptive coloration, eliminating shadow, self-decoration, cryptic behaviour, motion camouflage, changeable skin appearance, countershading, counter-illumination, transparency, and silvering to reflect the environment. Many species are cryptically coloured to resemble their surroundings. For example, Uroplatus geckos can be almost completely invisible, even to a nearby observer. Similarly, the katydids, a group of grasshopper-like insects found worldwide, are nocturnal and use their cryptic coloration to remain unnoticed during the day. They remain perfectly still, often in a position that increases the effectiveness of their camouflage.

== Second-level deception: programmed behaviours ==
At the second level, an animal conducts a programmed act of behaviour when another organism is registered. Examples include a predator's behaving in such a way as to hide its predatory nature around prey.

=== Feigning death ===
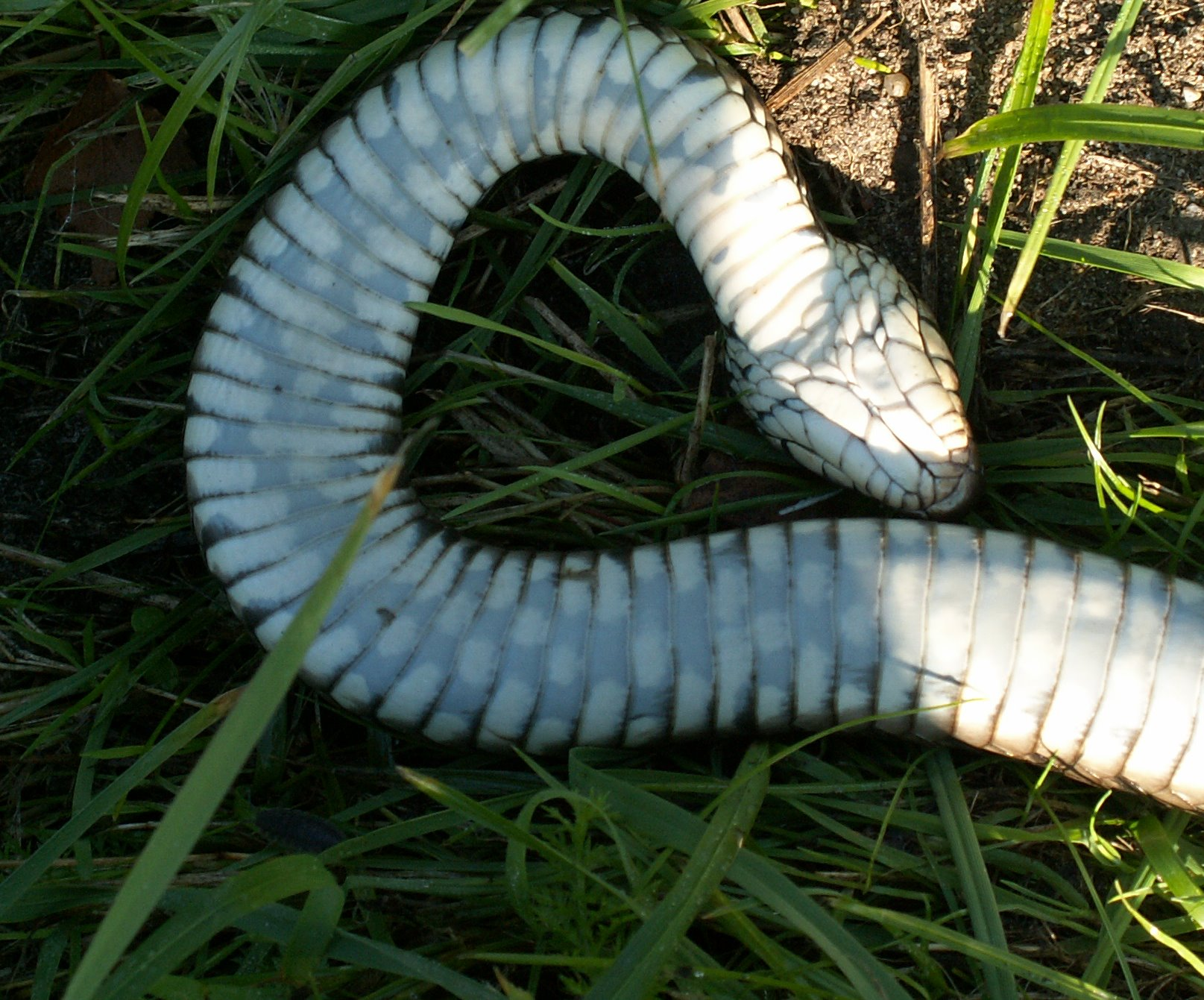
A grass snake feigning death.

A well-researched form of deception is feigning death, familiarly known as "playing dead" or "playing possum", although specialists use the terms "tonic immobility" or "thanatosis". A wide range of animals, e.g. lizards, birds, rodents, and sharks, behave as if dead as an anti-predator adaptation, as predators usually take only live prey.

In beetles, artificial selection experiments have shown that there is heritable variation for length of death-feigning. Those selected for longer death-feigning durations are at a selective advantage to those at shorter durations when a predator is introduced. Birds often feign death to escape predation; for example tonic immobility in quail reduces the probability of attacks by cats.

Death feigning may also play a role in reproduction, for example, in the nursery web spider, the male sometimes feigns death to avoid getting eaten by females during mating. In some cases, death feigning is used by a predator. For example, the predatory cichlid Nimbochromis livingstonii lies on its side on the bottom sediments until approached by scavengers attracted to what appears to be a dead fish, whereupon H. livingstoni abandons the pretence, rights itself and attacks the scavenger.

== Third-level deception: learnt behaviours ==
The third level involves learning, and is based upon trial and error. An example is a distraction display of feigned injury to get or divert attention; for example, a parent mockingbird feigning an injury to attract a predator away from its defenceless offspring.

=== Distraction displays ===
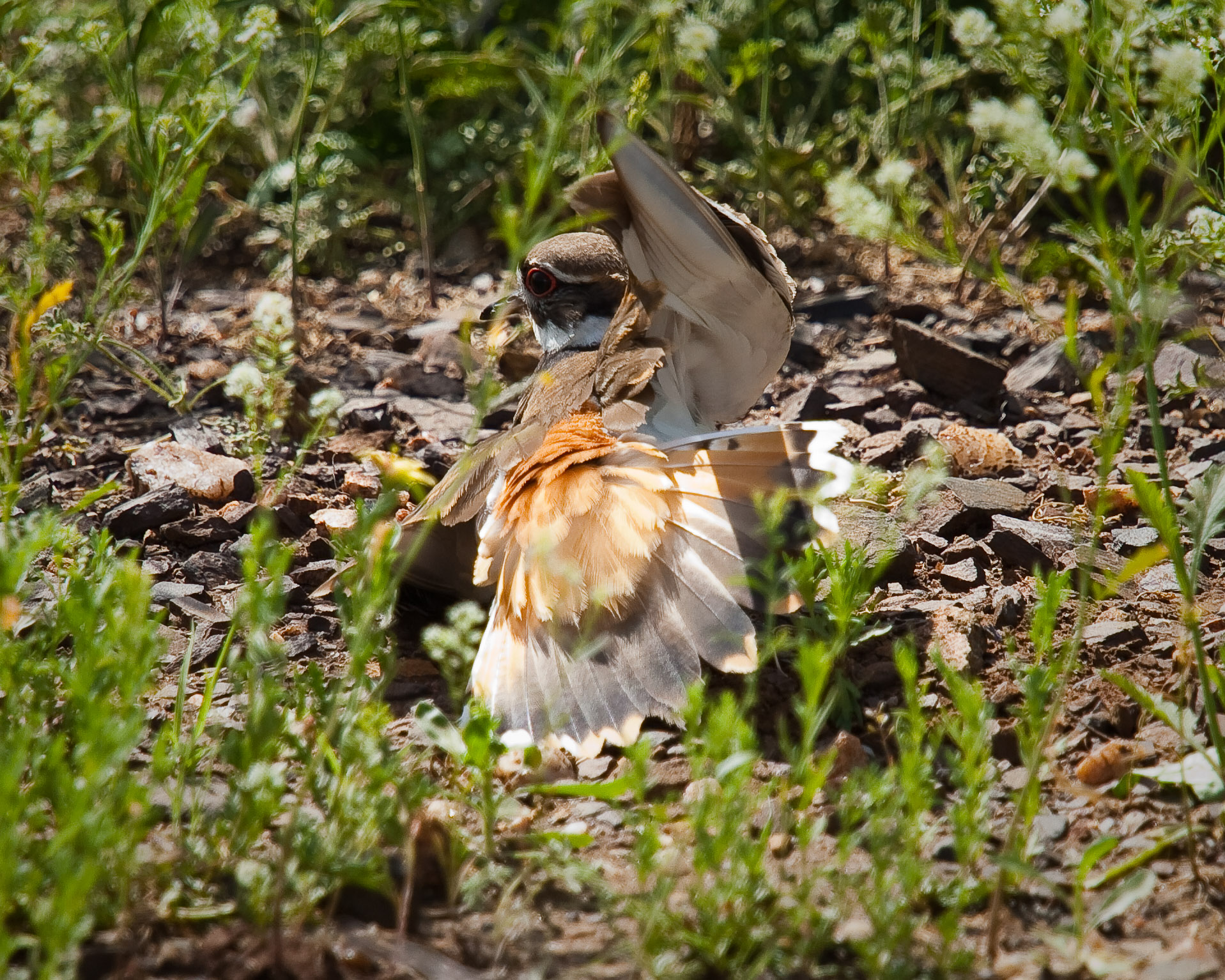
A killdeer feigning a broken wing, a typical distraction display to deceive predators

Distraction displays, also known as deflection displays and diversionary displays, are behaviours that draw the attention of a predator away from an object, typically the nest or young. These are well known in birds, as first described by Aristotle in the 4th century BC, but also occur in fish. A familiar example is the broken-wing display seen in nesting waders, plovers and doves such as the mourning dove. In this display, a bird walks away from its nest with one wing dragging on the ground. It seems to be an easy target, thus distracting the predator's attention away from the nest. Once the bird is far enough away it "recovers" and quickly flies off.

=== Self-deception ===
Mitchell has proposed that self-deception occurs if the deceiver and the object of deception are the same organism. Scientists differ on whether self-deception is intentional. For Mitchell and for Šekrst, intentionality can only be analysed at the third level, not involving recognition of what the other animal believes about the action.

Dishonest behaviour has been described in the slender crayfish (Cherax dispar). The philosopher Kristina Šekrst uses the findings to show that if this is held to involve self-deception, then belief is implied to be present, meaning at least Mitchell's third level of deception. The evolutionary ecologist Michael Angilletta et al. show that to establish adaptive self-deception, biologists must quantify the cost and benefit of ignoring one's true competitive ability. In the case of the slender crayfish, deceptive signallers largely ignored their own strength when escalating or evading aggression.

Angilletta et al. established two conditions for self-deception. First, dishonest individuals must escalate aggression using the same signals that honest individuals do. Second, both dishonest and honest individuals must escalate aggression according to the quality they have signalled, regardless of their actual quality. If both conditions hold, natural selection can lead to genotypes with little or no awareness of their own deception.

== Fourth-level deception: tactical ==
At the fourth level, deception includes recognition of other animals' beliefs, i.e., second-order thinking, as when a chimpanzee misleads other chimpanzees to prevent their discovering a food source. This type of deception seems to be prevalent in humans, but this level also corresponds to the realization of higher-order intentionality. Tactical or functional deception is the use of signals or displays from an animal's normal repertoire to mislead or deceive another individual.

== See also ==
- Animal communication
- Deception
- Intentionality
- Mimicry
- Camouflage
- Apparent death
- Distraction display
- Self-deception
