= Marine camouflage =

Marine camouflage may refer to:

- Underwater camouflage in marine animals, by any of a variety of methods
- Ship camouflage, including dazzle camouflage and disruptive camouflage
- MARPAT, a printed digital camouflage pattern used by United States Marines
