= Crypsis =

Aspect of animal behaviour and morphology

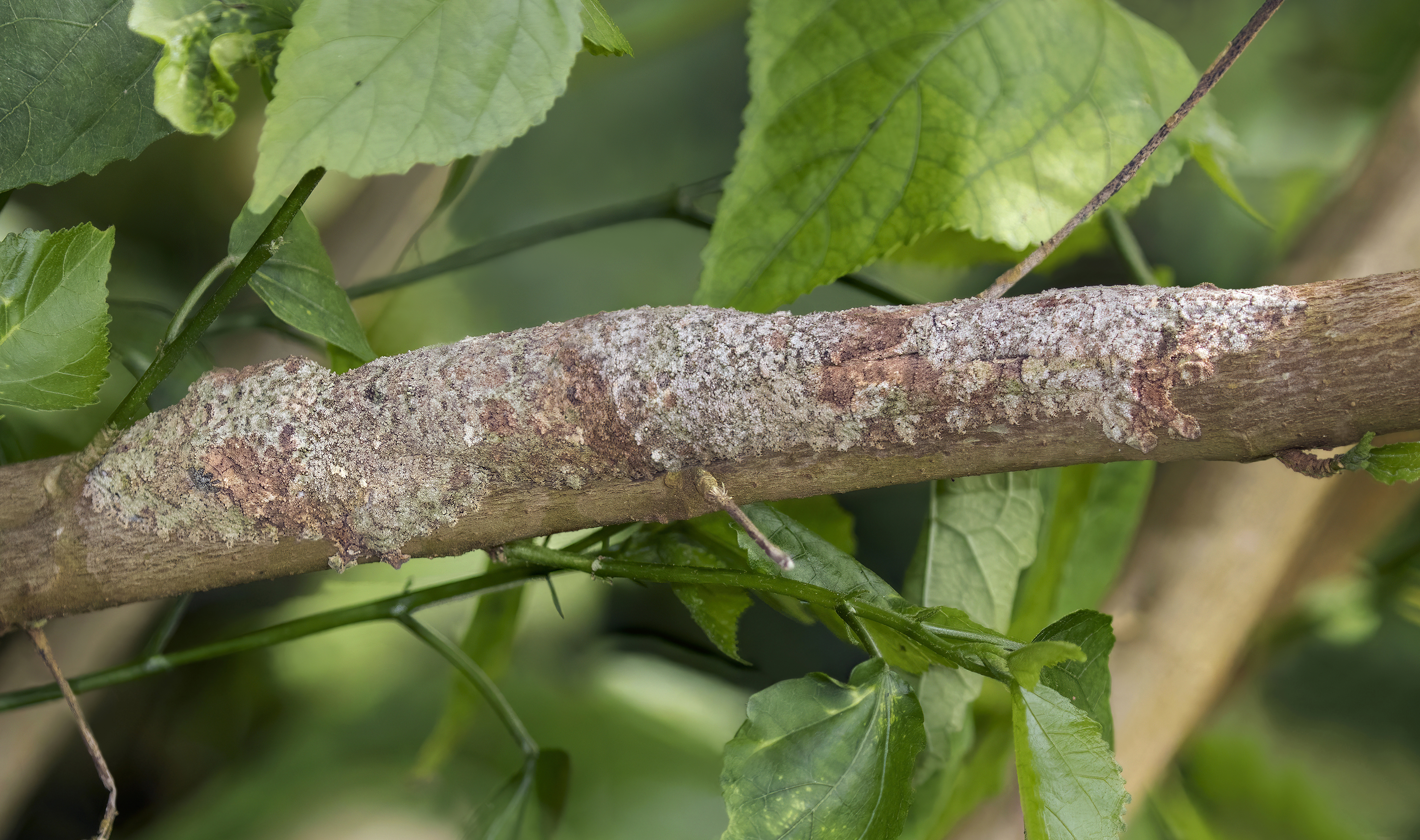
Hiding

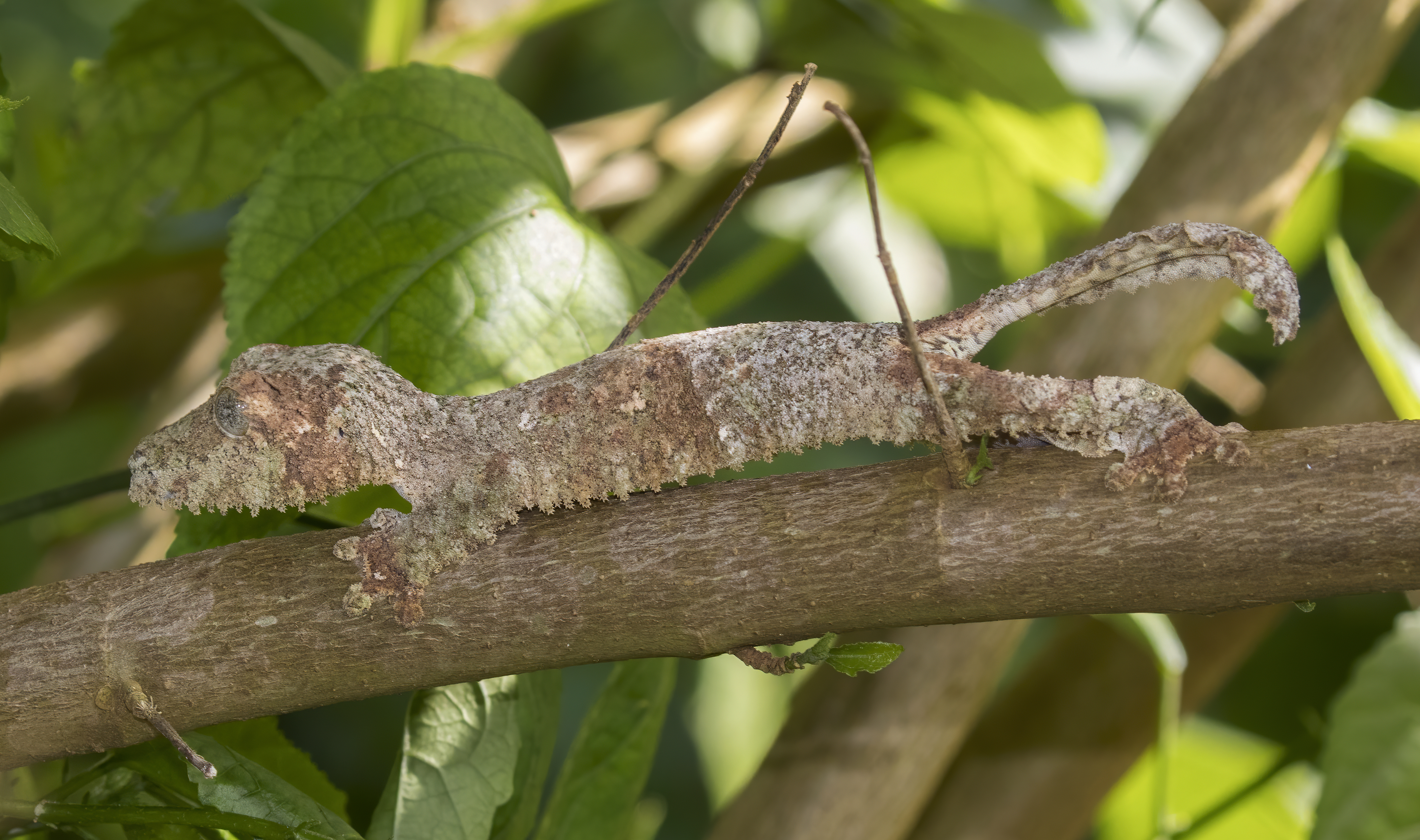
Revealing itself

Cryptic behavior. Mossy leaf-tailed gecko (Uroplatus sikorae) Montagne d'Ambre, Madagascar, showing camouflage using a flange of skin to eliminate shadow

In ecology, crypsis is the ability of an animal or a plant to avoid observation or detection by other animals. It may be part of a predation strategy or an antipredator adaptation. Methods include camouflage, nocturnality, subterranean lifestyle and mimicry. Crypsis can involve visual, olfactory (with pheromones) or auditory concealment. When it is visual, the term cryptic coloration, effectively a synonym for animal camouflage, is sometimes used, but many different methods of camouflage are employed in nature.

== Overview ==
There is a strong evolutionary pressure for prey animals to avoid predators through camouflage, and for predators to be able to detect camouflaged prey. There can be a self-perpetuating coevolution, in the shape of an evolutionary arms race, between the perceptive abilities of animals attempting to detect the cryptic animal and the cryptic characteristics of the hiding species.

== Methods ==
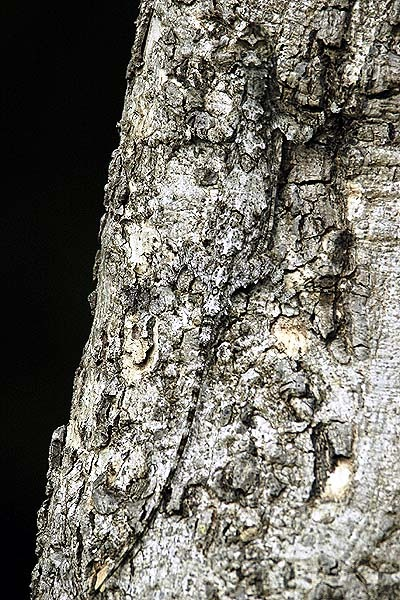
A Draco lizard showing camouflage methods including background matching, disruptive coloration, reduction of shadow, and cryptic behavior in Bandipur National Park

Methods of crypsis include (visual) camouflage, nocturnality, and subterranean lifestyle. Camouflage can be achieved by a wide variety of methods, from disruptive coloration to transparency and some forms of mimicry, even in habitats like the open sea where there is no background.

As a strategy, crypsis is used by predators against prey and by prey against predators.

Crypsis also applies to eggs and pheromone production. Crypsis can in principle involve visual, olfactory, or auditory camouflage.

=== Visual ===
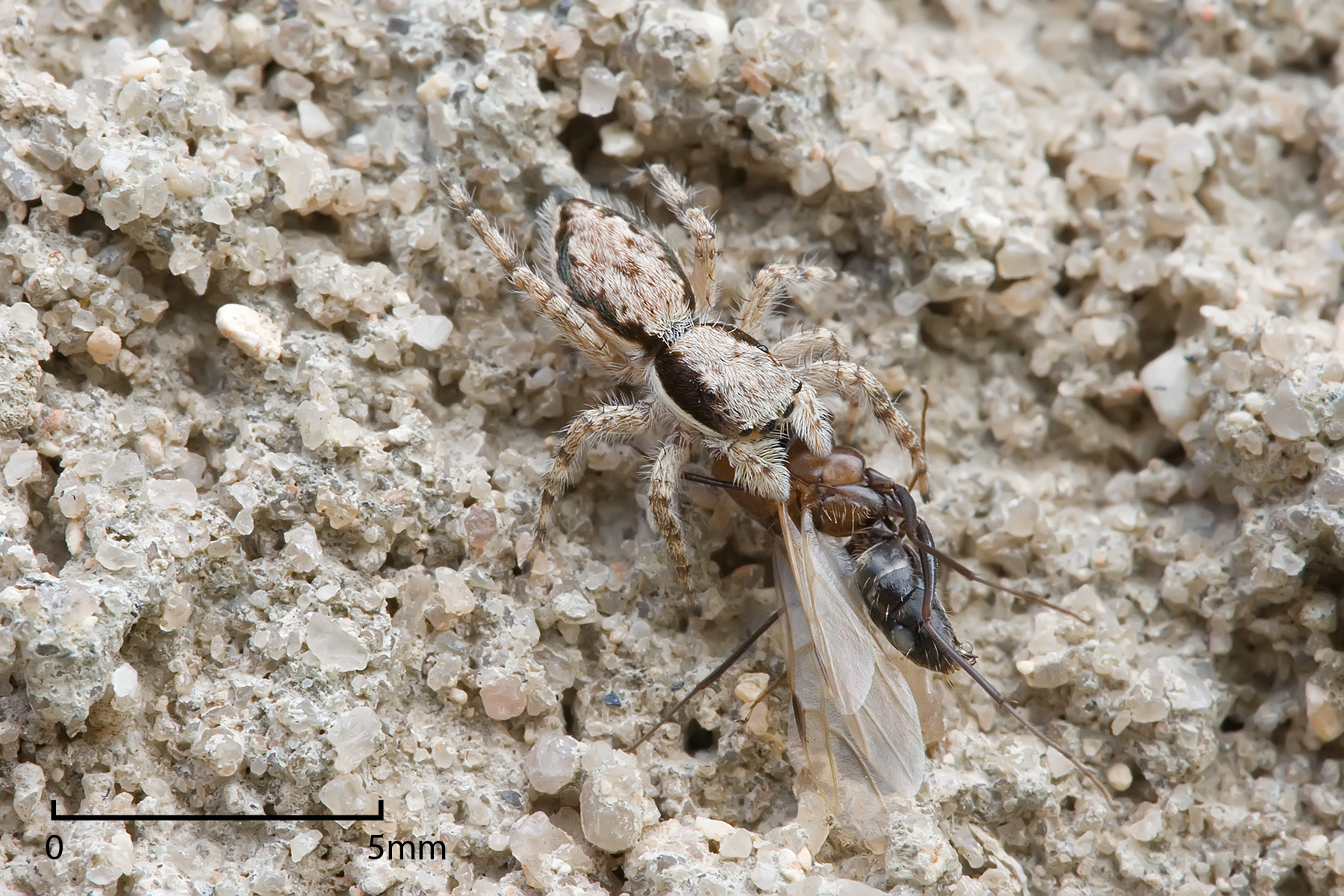
Camouflage allows animals like this disruptively-patterned spider to capture prey more easily.

Many animals have evolved so that they visually resemble their surroundings by using any of the many methods of natural camouflage that may match the color and texture of the surroundings (cryptic coloration) and/or break up the visual outline of the animal itself (disruptive coloration). Such animals, like the tawny dragon lizard, may resemble rocks, sand, twigs, leaves, and even bird droppings (mimesis). Other methods including transparency and silvering are widely used by marine animals.

Some animals change color in changing environments seasonally, as in ermine and snowshoe hare, or far more rapidly with chromatophores in their integuments, as in chameleon and cephalopods such as squid.

Countershading, the use of different colors on upper and lower surfaces in graduating tones from a light belly to a darker back, is common in the sea and on land. It is sometimes called Thayer's law, after the American artist Abbott Handerson Thayer, who published a paper on the form in 1896 that explained that countershading paints out shadows to make solid objects appear flat, reversing the way that artists use paint to make flat paintings contain solid objects. Where the background is brighter than is possible even with white pigment, counter-illumination in marine animals, such as squid, can use light to match the background.

Some animals actively camouflage themselves with local materials. The decorator crabs attach plants, animals, small stones, or shell fragments to their carapaces to provide camouflage that matches the local environment. Some species preferentially select stinging animals such as sea anemones or noxious plants, benefiting from aposematism as well as or instead of crypsis.

=== Olfactory ===
Some animals, in both terrestrial and aquatic environments, appear to camouflage their odor, which might otherwise attract predators. Numerous arthropods, both insects and spiders, mimic ants, whether to avoid predation, to hunt ants, or (as in the large blue butterfly caterpillar) to trick the ants into feeding them. Pirate perch (Aphredoderus sayanus) may exhibit chemical crypsis, making them undetectable to frogs and insects colonizing ponds. Trained dogs and meerkats, both scent-oriented predators, have been shown to have difficulty detecting puff adders, whose strategy of ambushing prey necessitates concealment from both predators and prey.

=== Auditory ===
Some insects, notably some Noctuid moths, (such as the large yellow underwing), and some tiger moths, (such as the garden tiger), have been supposed to defend themselves against predation by echolocating bats, both by passively absorbing sound with soft, fur-like body coverings and by actively creating sounds to mimic echoes from other locations or objects. The active strategy was described as a "phantom echo" that might therefore represent "auditory crypsis" with alternative theories about interfering with the bats' echolocation ("jamming"). Subsequent research has provided evidence for only two functions of moth sounds, neither of which involve "auditory crypsis". Tiger moth species appear to cluster into two distinct groups. One type produces sounds as acoustic aposematism, warning the bats that the moths are unpalatable, or at least performing as acoustic mimics of unpalatable moths. The other type uses sonar jamming. In the latter type of moth, detailed analyses failed to support a "phantom echo" mechanism underlying sonar jamming, but instead pointed towards echo interference.
