= List of camouflage methods =

List of ways of hiding objects or animals in plain sight

Camouflage is the concealment of animals or objects of military interest by any combination of methods that helps them to remain unnoticed. This includes the use of high-contrast disruptive patterns as used on military uniforms, but anything that delays recognition can be used as camouflage. Camouflage involves deception, whether by looking like the background or by resembling something else, which may be plainly visible to observers. This article lists methods used by animals and the military to escape notice.

== Conventions used ==
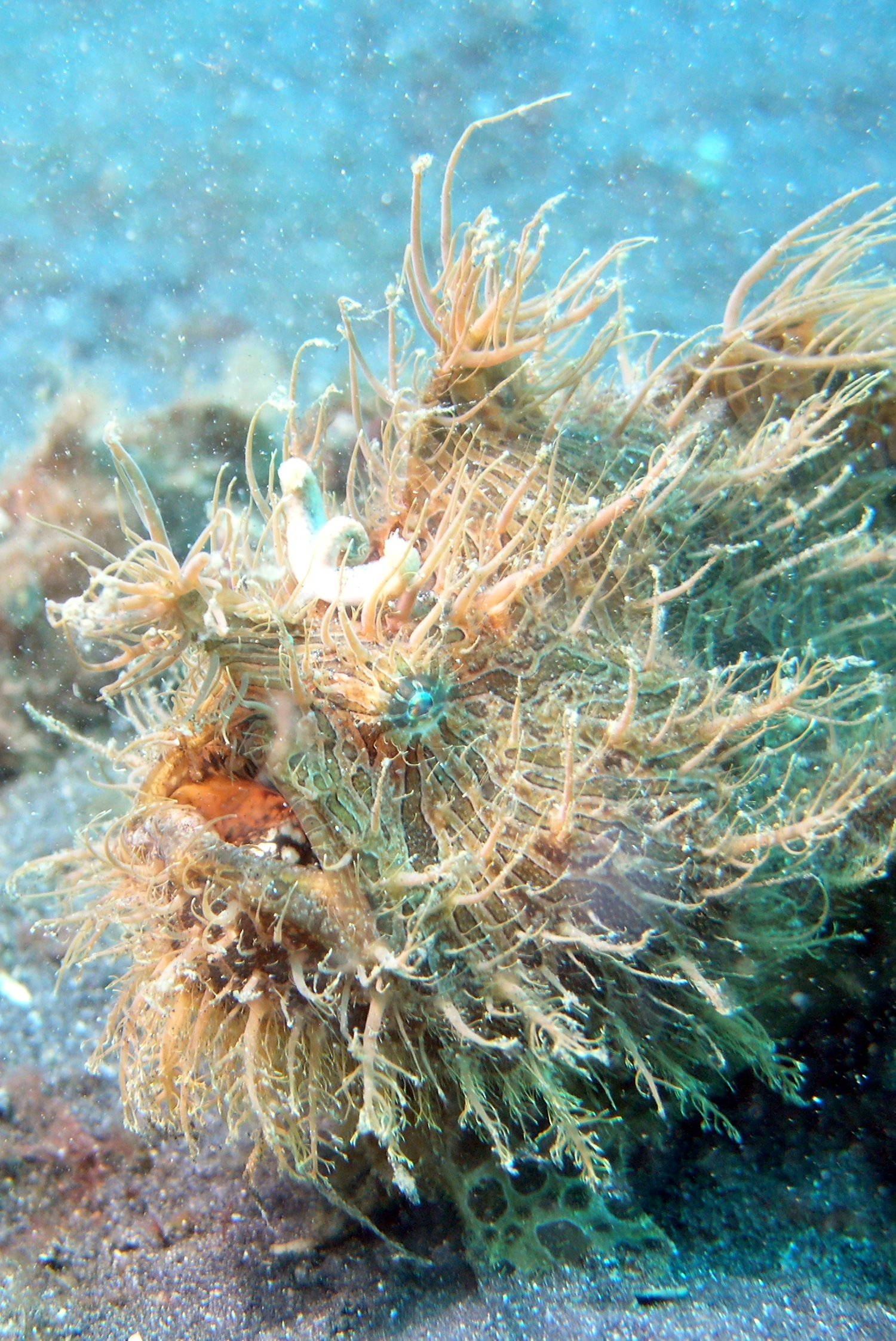
Striated frogfish, Antennarius striatus, is elaborately camouflaged for life on the subtropical ocean floor.

Different camouflage methods employed by terrestrial, aerial, and aquatic animals, and in military usage, are compared in the table. Several methods are often combined, so for example the Bushbuck is both countershaded over its whole body, and disruptively coloured with small pale spots. Until the discovery of countershading in the 1890s, protective coloration was considered to be mainly a matter of colour matching, but while this is certainly important, a variety of other methods are used to provide effective camouflage.

When an entry is marked Dominant, that method is used widely in that environment, in most cases. For example, countershading is very common among land animals, but not for military camouflage. The dominant camouflage methods on land are countershading and disruptive coloration, supported by less frequent usage of many other methods. The dominant camouflage methods in the open ocean are transparency, reflection, and counterillumination. Transparency and reflectivity are dominant in the top 100 metres (330 ft) of the ocean; counterillumination is dominant from 100 metres (330 ft) down to 1,000 metres (3,300 ft). Most animals of the open sea use one or more of these methods. Military camouflage relies predominantly on disruptive patterns, though methods such as outline disruption are also used, and others have been prototyped.

In 1890 the English zoologist Edward Bagnall Poulton categorised animal colours by their uses, which cover both camouflage and mimicry. Poulton's categories were largely followed by Hugh Cott in 1940. Relevant Poulton categories are listed in the table. Where Poulton's definition covers a method but does not name it explicitly, the category is named in parentheses.

== Comparisons ==
Examples of camouflage methods in animal and military usage
Method	Poulton category	Terrestrial, aerial	Aquatic	Military
Mimesis: resembling something not of interest to the observer	Special aggressive resemblance: mimesis by a predator to avoid scaring off prey	Flower mantis	Green frogfish	Sunshield
Mimesis: resembling something not of interest to the observer	Special protective resemblance: resemblance to a specific object by prey to avoid detection by predators	Dead leaf butterfly	Soft coral spider crab	Observation tree, 1916
Colour matching: having similar colours to the environment, also known as background matching	General protective resemblance: resembling the background in a general way	European tree frog	Brown trout	Khaki uniforms, 1910
Disruptive coloration: having high contrast coloration that breaks up outlines, so observers fail to recognise the object	General protective resemblance (a type of)	Papuan frogmouth Dominant	Commerson's frogfish	Disruptive Pattern Material Dominant
Disruptive eye mask: a disruptive pattern that covers or runs up to the eyes, concealing them	Coincident disruptive pattern (a type of) (Cott)	Common frog	Jack-knifefish	Gun barrel of Sherman Firefly
Seasonal variation: having coloration that varies with season, usually summer to winter	Variable general protective resemblance: having coloration that resembles the background in each season, in a general way	Arctic hare	Walleye	Snow overalls
Side or Thayer countershading: having graded toning from dark above to light below, so as to cancel out the apparent effect of self-shadowing when viewed from the side	—	Bushbuck (also has white distractive markings) Dominant	Blue shark	Hugh Cott's guns
Above/below countershading: having different colours or patterns above and below, to camouflage the upperside for observers from above, and the underside for observers from below	—	Gull (white underside to match sky, improves fishing success)	Penguins	Supermarine Spitfire
Counterillumination: generating light to raise the brightness of an object to match a brighter background, as of a marine animal's underside against the sea surface	—	—	Sparkling enope squid Dominant (100–1000m)	Yehudi lights (prototype)
Transparency: letting so much light through that the object is hard to see in typical lighting conditions	General protective resemblance (a type of)	Glass frogs	Comb jellies Dominant (0–100m)	1916 trials
Reflection (silvering): reflecting enough light, usually from the sides, to make the object show as a (reflected) patch of the environment	General protective resemblance (a type of)	—	Pilchard Dominant (0–100m)	—
Self-decoration: covering oneself in materials from the environment	Adventitious protection: covering oneself in materials that are not part of the body	Masked hunter bug	Decorator crabs	Ghillie suit
Concealment of shadow: having features such as flanges or a flattened body to reduce or hide the shadow	—	Flying lizard	Tasselled wobbegong	Camouflage netting
Irregular outline: having a broken or complex outline (that may help delay recognition by an observer)	Special protective resemblance (types of)	Comma butterfly	Leafy sea dragon	Scrim, branches
Distraction: having coloration that distracts an observer's attention away from a feature of the object (such as the head or eye)	—	Eyespots of peacock butterfly	Foureye butterflyfish	False bow wave in ship camouflage
Distractive markings Small conspicuous marks that distract an observer's attention from recognising the object as a whole	—	Snowy owl with distractively marked plumage	—	Snow camouflage using small distractive marks
Active camouflage: changing the coloration rapidly enough to maintain resemblance to the current background while moving	Variable aggressive resemblance, variable protective resemblance: varying coloration to resemble the background, in predator and prey respectively	Veiled chameleon	Octopuses	Adaptiv (see that article for image)
Motion camouflage: following a track such that the object remains between a starting point and the target (e.g. prey) at all times, rather than going straight for the target	—	Hoverfly	—	Air-to-air missile Used primarily for efficiency
Motion dazzle: rapidly moving a bold pattern of contrasting stripes, confusing an observer's visual processing	—	Zebra	—	Proposal only (NB: Marine; Dazzle camouflage did not claim this effect)
Dazzle camouflage: bold patterns of contrasting stripes, deceiving enemy about ship's heading	—	—	—	Ship camouflage, mainly WW1 Dominant 1917–18
Ultra-blackness: extremely black surface, matching very dark background	—	Black panther	Deep-sea fish	Night fighters

== Bibliography ==
- Barkas, Geoffrey; Barkas, Natalie (1952). The Camouflage Story (from Aintree to Alamein). Cassell.
- Beddard, Frank Evers (1892). Animal Coloration: an account of the principal facts and theories relating to the colours and markings of animals. Swan Sonnenschein.
- Cott, Hugh (1940). Adaptive Coloration in Animals. Oxford University Press.
- Forbes, Peter (2009). Dazzled and Deceived: Mimicry and Camouflage. Yale. ISBN 978-0-300-12539-9.
- Herring, Peter (2002). The Biology of the Deep Ocean. Oxford University Press. ISBN 978-0-198-54956-7.
- Newark, Tim (2007). Camouflage. Thames and Hudson. ISBN 978-0-500-51347-7.
- Poulton, Edward Bagnall (1890). The Colours of Animals: their meaning and use especially considered in the case of insects. Kegan Paul, Trench, Trübner.
- Stevens, Martin; Merilaita, Sami (2011). Animal Camouflage. Cambridge University Press. ISBN 978-0-521-19911-7.
- Wickler, Wolfgang (1968). Mimicry in plants and animals. McGraw-Hill. ISBN 978-1-114-82438-6
