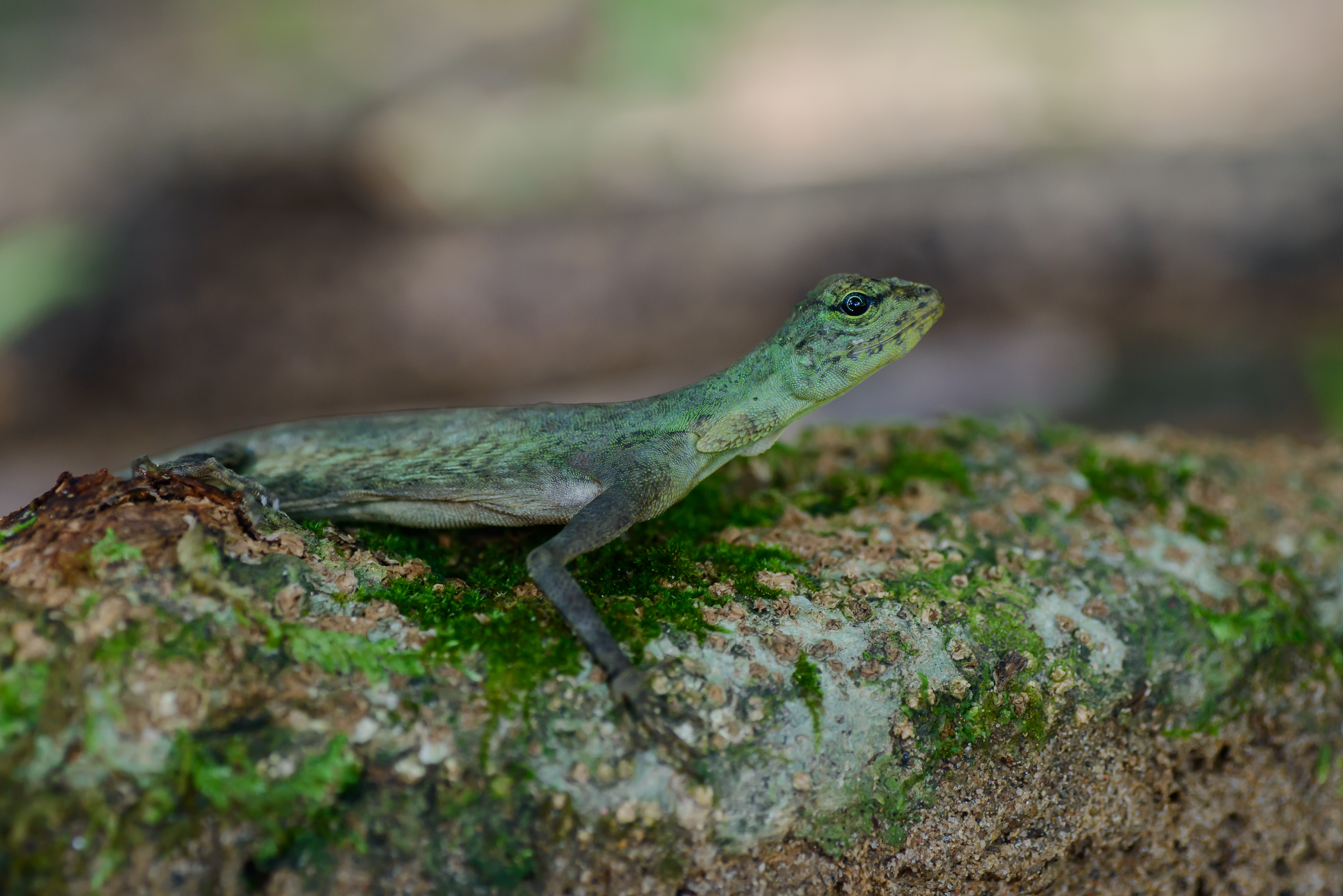
- Draco blanfordii, in Khao Sok National Park, Thailand

Conservation status
- Least Concern (IUCN 3.1)

Scientific classification
- Kingdom: Animalia
- Phylum: Chordata
- Class: Reptilia
- Order: Squamata
- Suborder: Iguania
- Family: Agamidae
- Genus: Draco
- Species: D. blanfordii

Binomial name
- Draco blanfordii Boulenger, 1885

= Draco blanfordii =

Species of lizard

Draco blanfordii, commonly known as Blanford's flying dragon, Blanford's flying lizard, or Blanford's gliding lizard, is a species of "flying" lizard in the family Agamidae. The species is endemic to Asia, and is capable of gliding from tree to tree.

== Geographic range ==
D. blanfordii is found in Bangladesh, China (SW Yunnan), India, Malaysia (West), Myanmar, Thailand (East), and Vietnam,

== Etymology ==
The specific name, blanfordii, is in honor of English geologist and naturalist William Thomas Blanford of the Geological Survey of India in British India.

== Description ==
D. blanfordii is similar to D. indochinensis. However, while the dewlap of D. indochinensis is widest at its base, decreases in width over its entire length, and terminates in a sharp point, in contrast, the dewlap of D. blanfordii is distally expanded with a basal constriction, and terminates in a rounded distal edge. D. indochinensis also differs from D. blanfordii in the presence (in both sexes) of a thick, black transverse band that extends across the posterior gular region from one throat lappet to the other, and in the presence of dark radial bands on the dorsal surfaces of the patagia in both sexes rather than in females only.

The head of D. blanfordii is small, and the snout is constricted, slightly longer than the diameter of the orbit. The nostril is directed upwards, perfectly vertical. The tympanum is naked, smaller than the eye-opening. The upper head-scales are unequal, keeled, with a prominent tubercle at the posterior corner of the orbit. There are nine upper labials. The male's gular appendage is longer than the head, very thin, covered with large scales. The male has a slight nuchal fold. The dorsal scales are equal, smooth or very feebly keeled, not larger than the ventrals. There is a series of widely separated enlarged keeled scales along the side of the back. The fore limb stretched forwards extends considerably beyond the tip of the snout; the adpressed hind limb nearly reaches the axilla. Colouration is grey-brown above, with small dark spots. The wing-membranes which above are marbled with dark brown, with lighter spots and lines, are beneath immaculate. The throat is unspotted, greenish, pale scarlet beneath the lateral wattles. Snout–vent length (SVL) is 4.75 in (12.1 cm), and the tail is 9 in (23 cm) long. D. blanfordii is the largest species of the genus.

== Habitat ==
The preferred natural habitat of D. blanfordii is dense seasonal tropical forest, at altitudes from sea level to 1,200 m (3,900 ft).

== Behaviour ==
D. blanfordii is arboreal and diurnal

== Diet ==
D. blanfordii preys upon ants.

== Reproduction ==
D. blanfordii is oviparous.
