= Peter Herring =

English marine biologist

Peter John Herring is an English marine biologist known for his work on the coloration, camouflage and bioluminescence of animals in the deep sea, and for the textbook The Biology of the Deep Ocean.

== Life ==
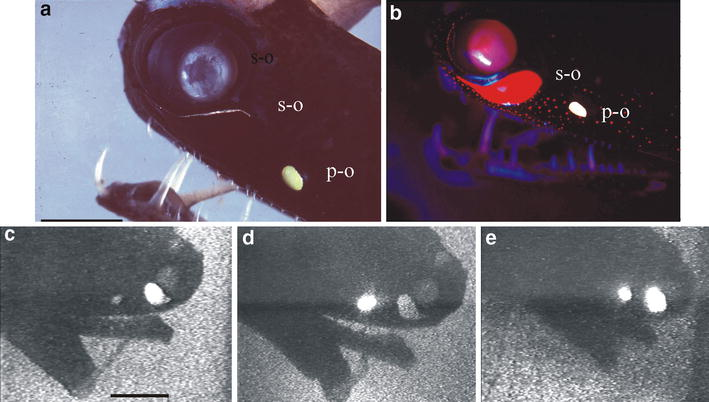
Flashing of photophores of black dragonfish, Malacosteus niger, showing red fluorescence modifying the bioluminescence

Herring took his Ph.D. at Cambridge University, spending 18 months at sea on the 1961-2 International Indian Ocean Expedition. This inspired him to join the National Institute of Oceanography in 1966 as a marine biologist. There, he investigated the coloration of animals in the deep sea, and their bioluminescence, relating its ecology and physiology to the colour vision of other animals. One aspect of this was underwater camouflage, where prey need to conceal themselves from the vision of their predators; since as Herring noted, there is no background in the sea, the methods of camouflage employed are often different from those on land: key methods include transparency, reflection (by silvering), and counter-illumination. He also studied the vision of shrimps in hydrothermal vents, and how the oxygen minimum in the northwestern Indian Ocean affected the distribution of midwater animals. He served as chief scientist on at least sixty research voyages. In 1981, he discovered red bioluminescent "searchlights" below the eyes of some dragonfish, and showed that these worked by using fluorescent proteins which shifted the mainly blue light actually generated by these fish into the red part of the visible spectrum.

== Works ==
Herring has written or contributed to more than 250 scientific papers and textbooks on marine zoology. His paper "Systematic distribution of bioluminescence in living organisms" has been cited at least 245 times, while "The spectral characteristics of luminous marine organisms" has been cited more than 165 times. The paper "The roles of filters in the photophores of oceanic animals and their relation to vision in the oceanic environment" has been cited at least 200 times and "Longwave-sensitive visual pigments in some deep-sea fishes: segregation of 'paired' rhodopsins and porphyropsins" over 125 times.

- 2002: The Biology of the Deep Ocean. Oxford University Press.
- 2002 "A View from the Window". NOAA.
- 2004: "Exploring the life in the ocean: how do we know what is there?". Bioscience explained.
