= Underwater camouflage =

Camouflage in water, mainly by transparency, reflection, counter-illumination

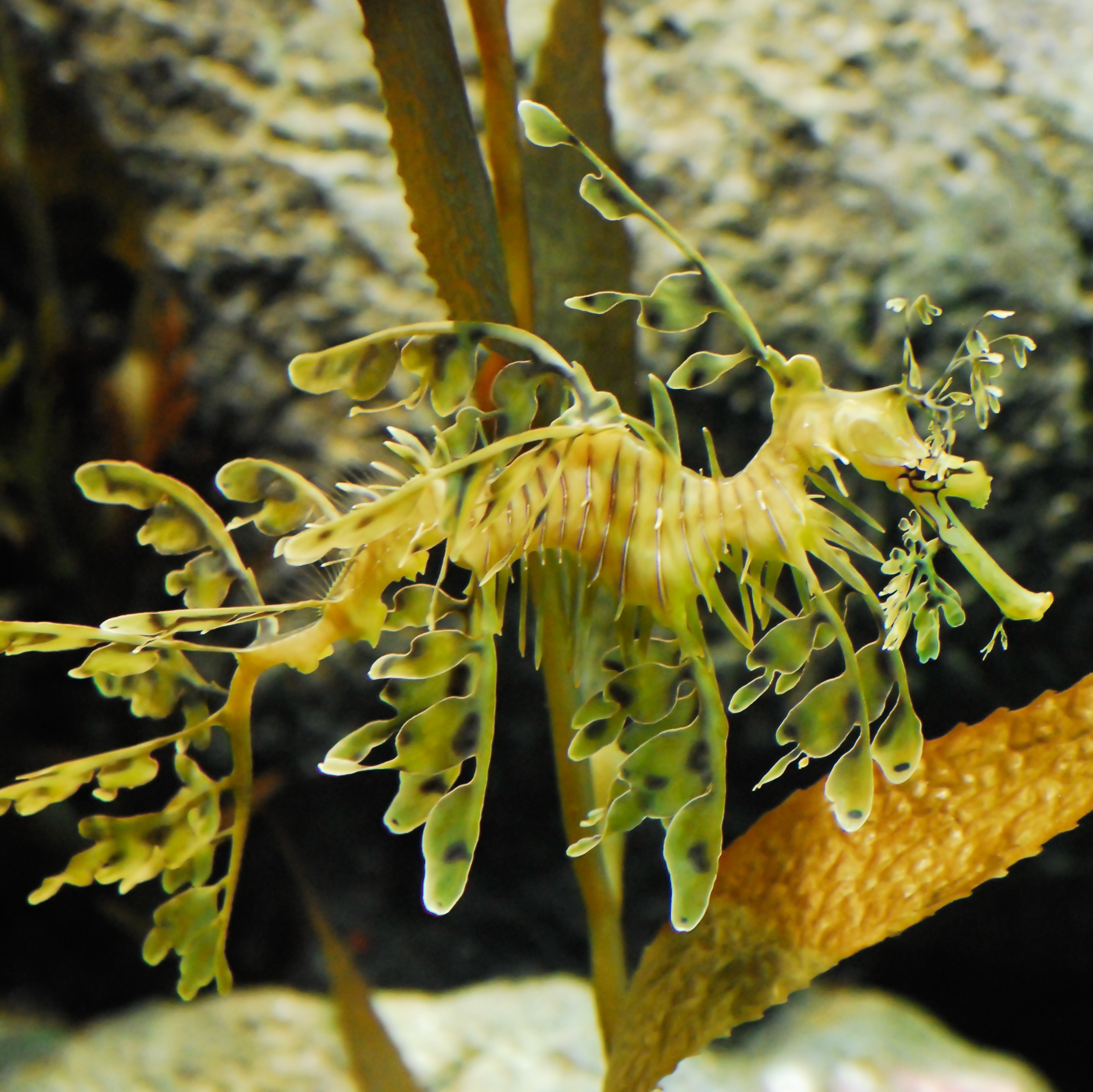
Leafy sea dragon avoids recognition by predators, with algae-like coloration, protuberances and behaviour

Underwater camouflage is the set of methods of achieving crypsis—avoidance of observation—that allows otherwise visible aquatic organisms to remain unnoticed by other organisms such as predators or prey.

Camouflage in large bodies of water differs markedly from camouflage on land. The environment is essentially the same on all sides. Light always falls from above, and there is generally no variable background (Note: The zoologist Peter Herring notes that even the word "background" is land-based. But the sea surface is continually changing.) to compare with trees and bushes. Near to the sea surface reflectivity and blue coloration are the most common form of camouflage. Below, countershading is more common, with blue coloration on the dorsal side and white on the ventral side. Below the epipelagic zone transparency is more frequent. In the aphotic zone red and black coloration are common, often in combination with bioluminescence. At the very deepest areas such as the benthic regions of the hadal zone, most animals use pale red and cream colors.

Camouflage in relatively shallow waters is more like terrestrial camouflage, where additional methods are used by many animals. For example, self-decoration is employed by decorator crabs; mimicry by animals such as the leafy sea dragon; countershading by many fish including sharks; distraction with eyespots by many fish; active camouflage through ability to change colour rapidly in fish such as the flounder, and cephalopods including octopus, cuttlefish, and squid.

== Context ==
The ability to camouflage oneself provides a survival advantage in the constant struggle between predators and prey. Natural selection has produced a wide variety of methods of survival in the oceans.

In Ancient Greece, Aristotle commented on the color-changing abilities, both for camouflage and for signalling, of cephalopods including the octopus, in his Historia animalium:

The octopus ... seeks its prey by so changing its colour as to render it like the colour of the stones adjacent to it; it does so also when alarmed.

== Methods ==
Three main camouflage methods predominate in the oceans: transparency, reflection, and counterillumination. Transparency and reflectivity are most important in the top 100 metres of the ocean; counterillumination is the main method from 100 metres down to 1000 metres; while camouflage becomes less important in the dark waters below 1000 metres. Most animals of the open sea use at least one of these methods to camouflage themselves.

=== Transparency ===
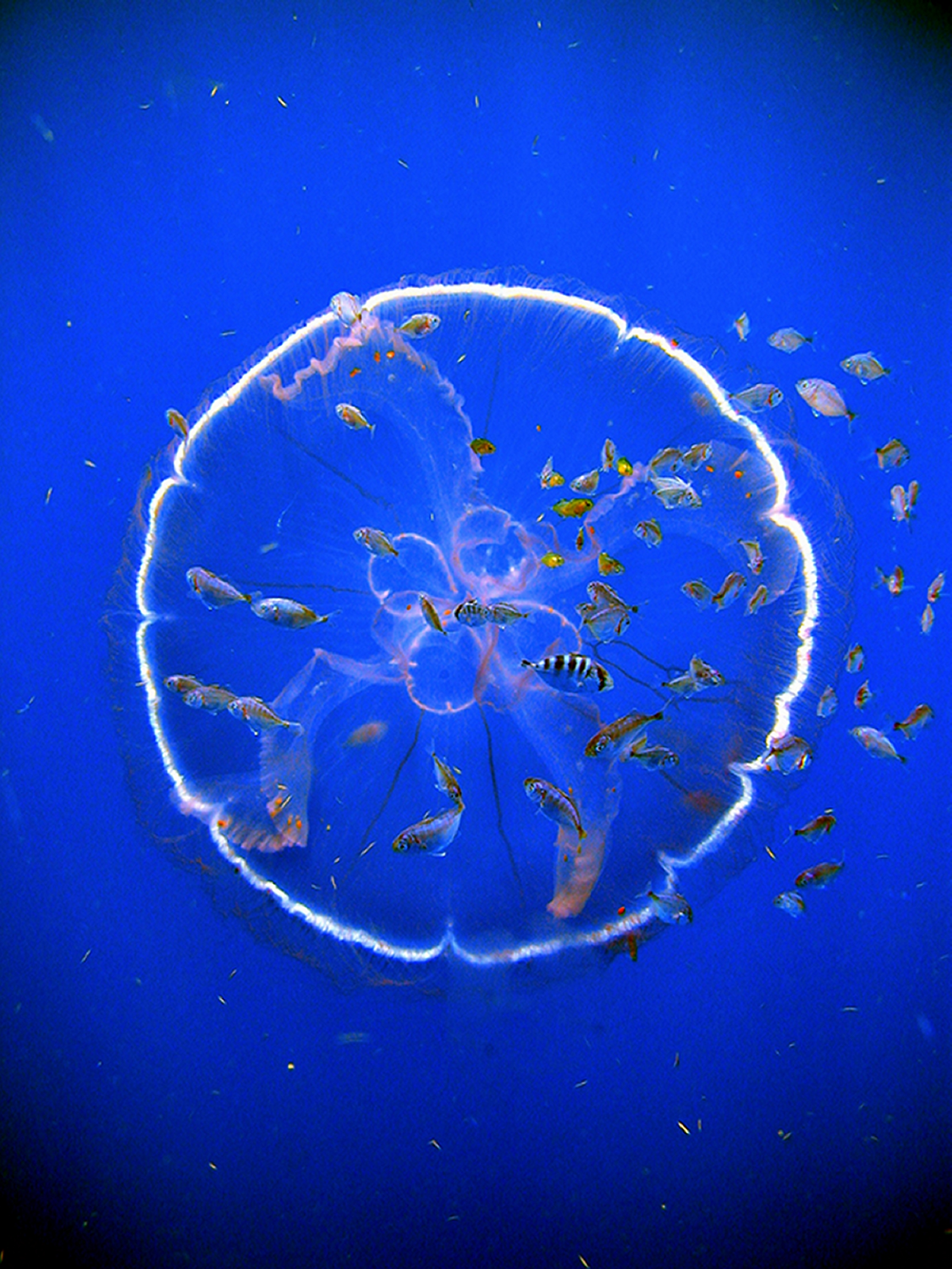
Many animals of the open sea, like this Aurelia labiata jellyfish, are largely transparent.

Transparency is common, even dominant, in animals of the open sea, especially those that live in relatively shallow waters. It is found in plankton of many species, as well as larger animals such as jellyfish, salps (floating tunicates), and comb jellies. Many marine animals that float near the surface are highly transparent, giving them almost perfect camouflage. However, transparency is difficult for bodies made of materials that have different refractive indices from seawater. Some marine animals such as jellyfish have gelatinous bodies, composed mainly of water; their thick mesogloea is acellular and highly transparent. This conveniently makes them buoyant, but it also makes them large for their muscle mass, so they cannot swim fast. Gelatinous planktonic animals are between 50 and 90 per cent transparent. A transparency of 50 per cent is enough to make an animal invisible to a predator such as cod at a depth of 650 metres (2,130 ft); better transparency is required for invisibility in shallower water, where the light is brighter and predators can see better. For example, a cod can see prey that are 98 per cent transparent in optimal lighting in shallow water. Therefore, transparency is most effective in deeper waters.

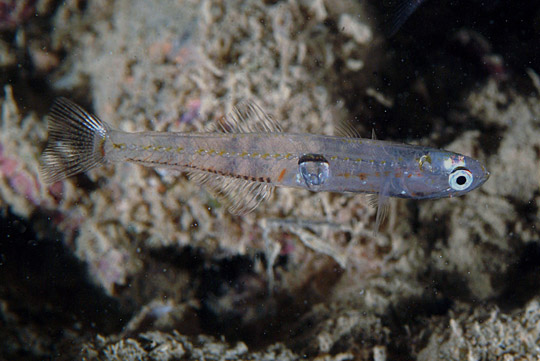
The transparent goby

Some tissues such as muscles can be made transparent, provided either they are very thin or organised as regular layers or fibrils that are small compared to the wavelength of visible light. Familiar examples of transparent body parts are the lens and cornea of the vertebrate eye. The lens is made of the protein crystallin; the cornea is made of the protein collagen. Other structures cannot be made transparent, notably the retinas or equivalent light-absorbing structures of eyes — they must absorb light to be able to function. The camera-type eye of vertebrates and cephalopods must be completely opaque. Finally, some structures are visible for a reason, such as to lure prey. For example, the nematocysts (stinging cells) of the transparent siphonophore Agalma okenii resemble small copepods. Examples of transparent marine animals include a wide variety of larvae, including coelenterates, siphonophores, salps, gastropod molluscs, polychaete worms, many shrimplike crustaceans, and fish; whereas the adults of most of these are opaque and pigmented, resembling the seabed or shores where they live. Adult comb jellies and jellyfish are mainly transparent, like their watery background. The small Amazon River fish Microphilypnus amazonicus and the shrimps it associates with, Pseudopalaemon gouldingi, are so transparent as to be "almost invisible"; further, these species appear to select whether to be transparent or more conventionally mottled (disruptively patterned) according to the local background in the environment.

=== Reflection ===
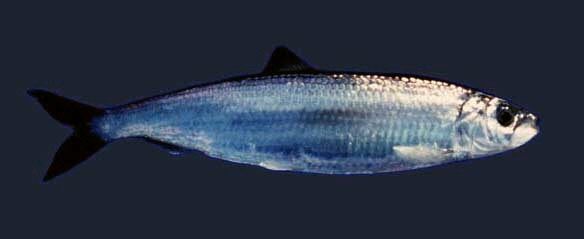
The adult herring,Clupea harengus, is a typical silvered fish of medium depths.

The herring's reflectors are nearly vertical for camouflage from the side.

Many fish are covered with highly reflective scales, giving the appearance of silvered mirror glass. Reflection through silvering is widespread or dominant in fish of the open sea, especially those that live in the top 100 metres. Where transparency cannot be achieved, it can be imitated effectively by silvering to make an animal's body highly reflective. At medium depths at sea, light comes from above, so a mirror oriented vertically makes animals such as fish invisible from the side. Most fish in the upper ocean such as sardine and herring are camouflaged by silvering.

The marine hatchetfish is extremely flattened laterally (side to side), leaving the body just millimetres thick, and the body is so silvery as to resemble aluminium foil. The mirrors consist of microscopic structures similar to those used to provide structural coloration: stacks of between 5 and 10 crystals of guanine spaced about ¼ of a wavelength apart to interfere constructively and achieve nearly 100 per cent reflection. In the deep waters that the hatchetfish lives in, only blue light with a wavelength of 500 nanometres percolates down and needs to be reflected, so mirrors 125 nanometres apart provide good camouflage.

In fish such as the herring which live in shallower water, the mirrors must reflect a mixture of wavelengths, and the fish accordingly has crystal stacks with a range of different spacings. A further complication for fish with bodies that are rounded in cross-section is that the mirrors would be ineffective if laid flat on the skin, as they would fail to reflect horizontally. The overall mirror effect is achieved with many small reflectors, all oriented vertically. Silvering is found in other marine animals as well as fish. The cephalopods, including squid, octopus and cuttlefish, have multi-layer mirrors made of protein rather than guanine.

=== Counter-illumination ===
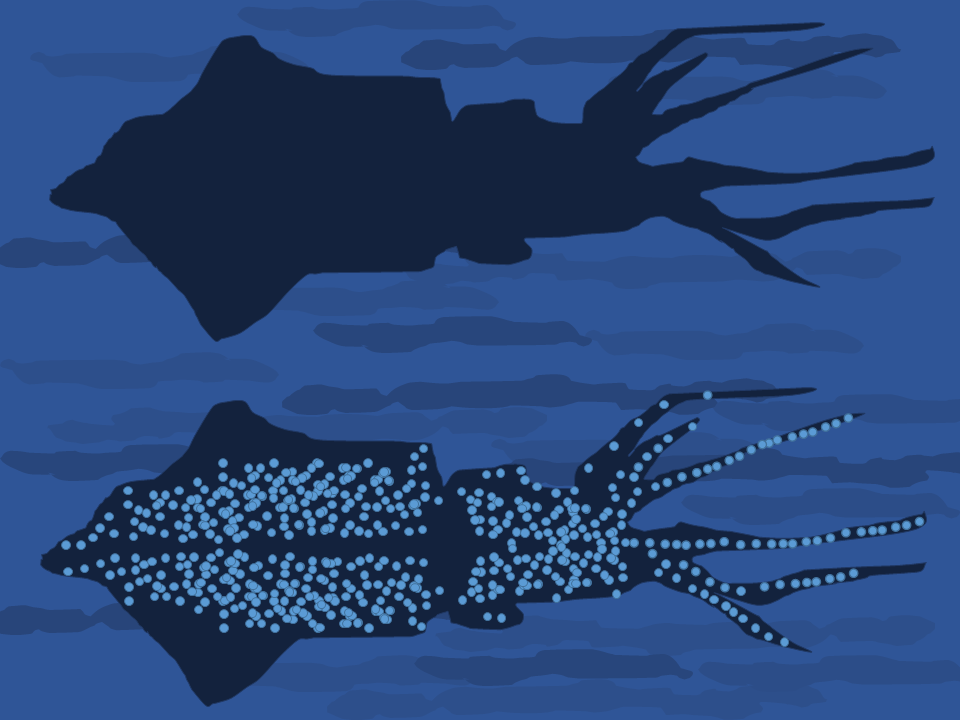
Principle of squid counter-illumination

Counter-illumination through bioluminescence on the underside (ventral region) of the body is found in many species that live in the open ocean down to about 1000 metres. The generated light increases an animal's brightness when seen from below to match the brightness of the ocean surface; it is an effective form of active camouflage. It is notably used by some species of squid, such as the midwater squid, Abralia veranyi. These have light-producing organs (photophores) scattered all over their undersides, creating a sparkling glow that prevents the animal from appearing as a dark shape when seen from below. Counter-illumination camouflage is the likely function of the bioluminescence of many marine organisms, though light is also produced to attract or to detect prey.

=== Countershading ===
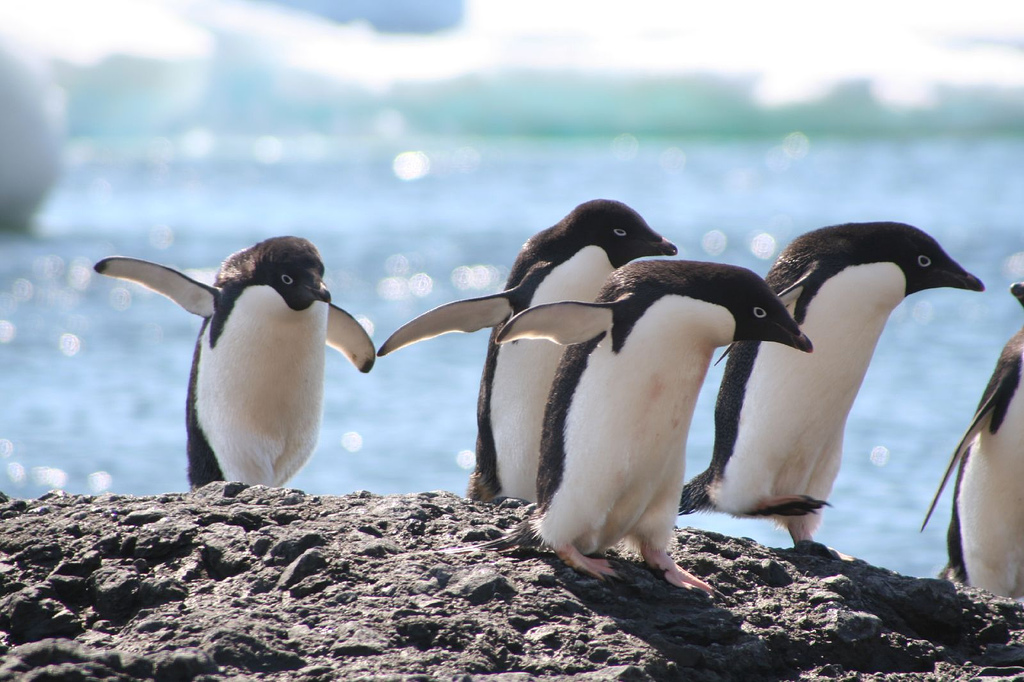
Adelie penguins, Pygoscelis adeliae, are white below and dark above.

Top/bottom countershading is common in fish including sharks, marlin, and mackerel, and animals in other groups such as dolphins, turtles and penguins. These animals have dark upper sides to match the ocean depths, and light undersides to avoid appearing dark against the bright sea surface.

=== Mimesis ===
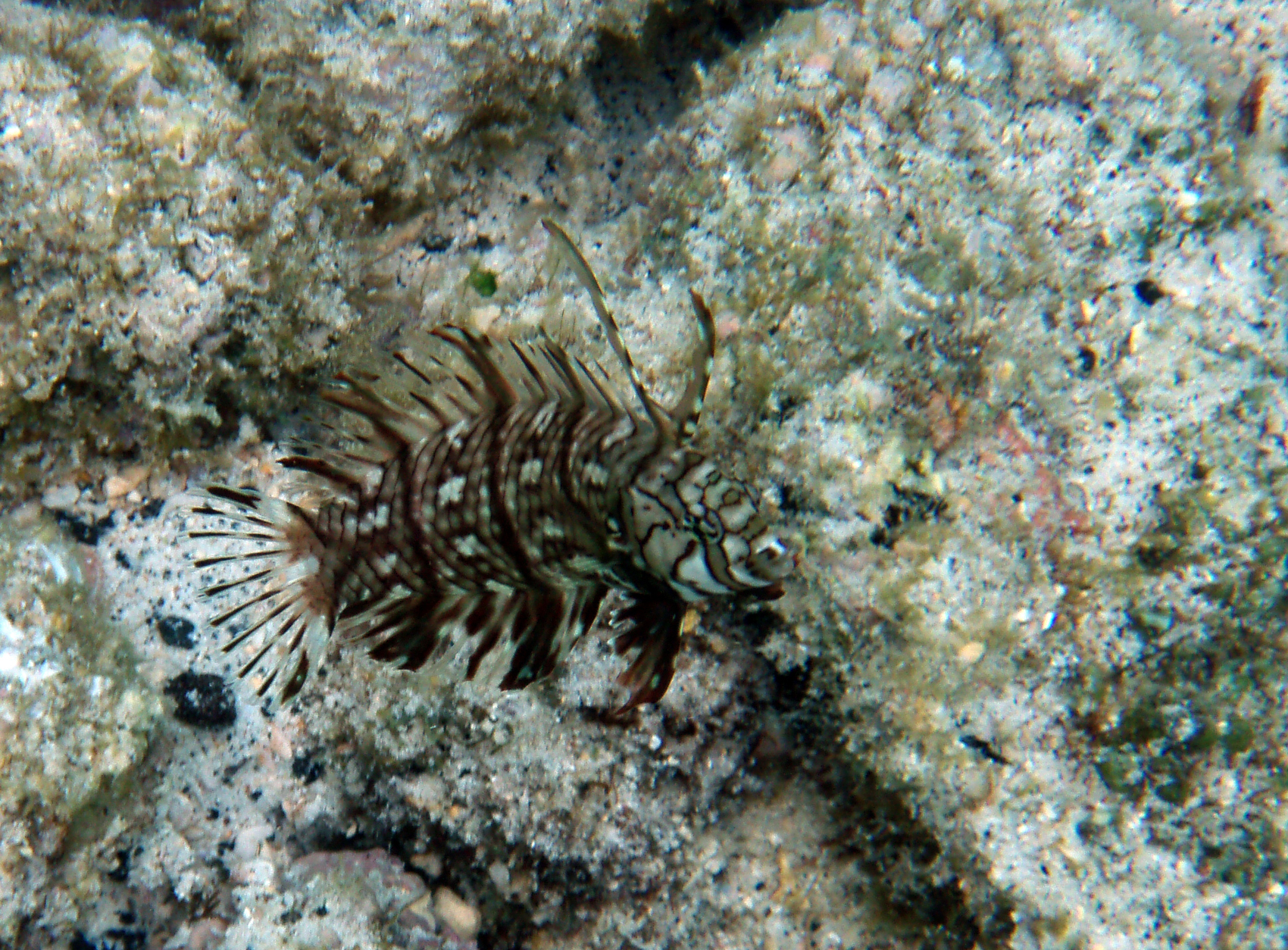
Juvenile rockmover, Novaculichthys taeniourus, mimics algae

Mimesis is practised by animals such as the leafy sea dragon, Phycodurus eques, and the leaf scorpionfish, Taenianotus triacanthus, which resemble parts of plants, and gently rock their bodies as if swayed by a current. In the fish species Novaculichthys taeniourus, the rockmover or dragon wrasse, there is a striking difference in appearance between the adults and the juveniles. A juvenile Rockmover resembles a loose piece of sea weed. It swims in a vertical position with its head pointing downwards, and behaves in a way that perfectly resembles the movement of a piece of seaweed: moving back and forth in the surge, as if it was inanimate.

=== Self-decoration ===
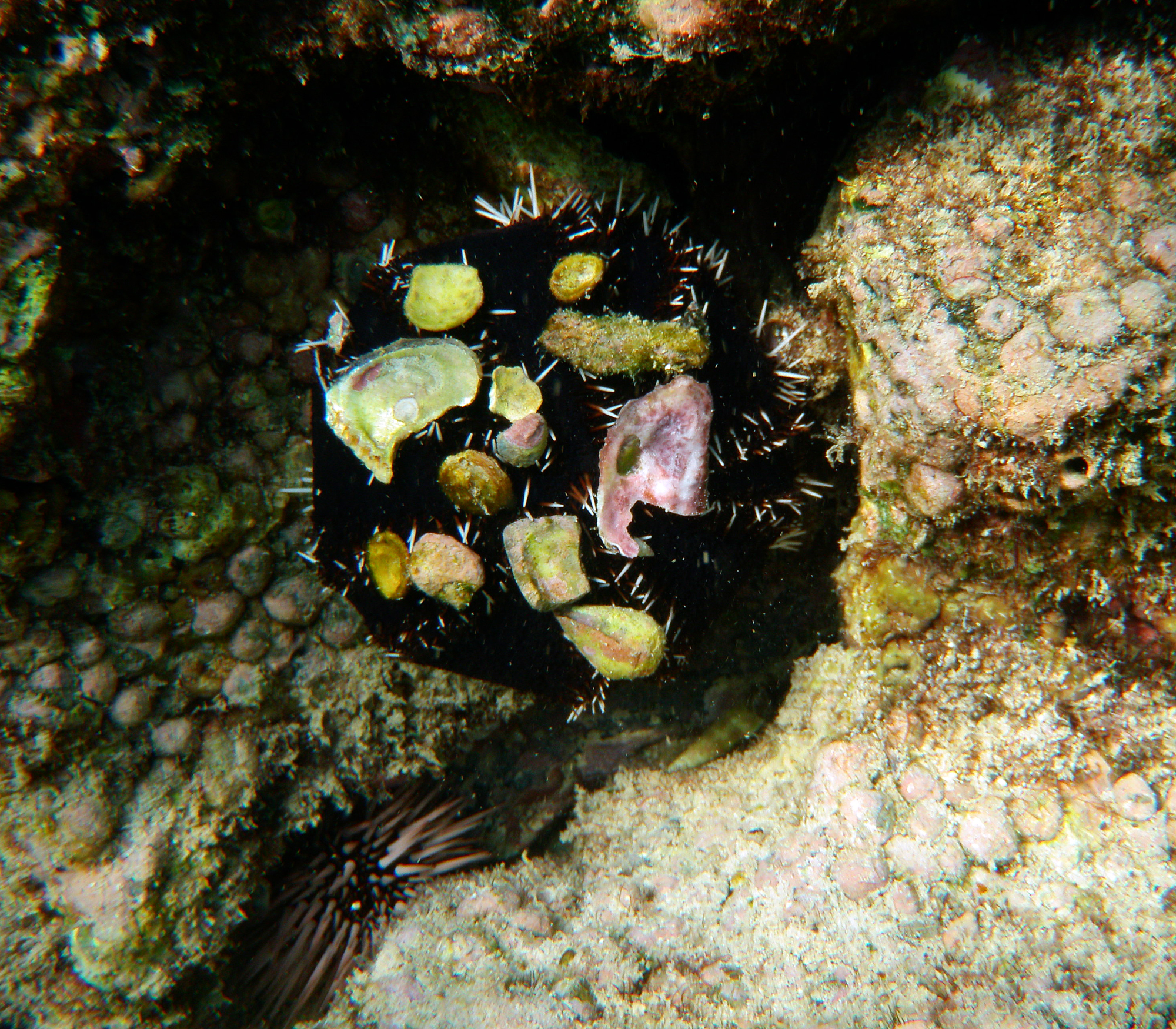
Self-decorated sea urchin

Self-decoration is employed by animals in different groups, including decorator crabs, which attach materials from their environment, as well as living organisms, to camouflage themselves. For example, the Japanese hermit crab, Eupagurus constans, has the hydroid Hydractinia sodalis growing all over the shell that it lives in. Another hermit crab, Eupagurus cuanensis, has the aposematic orange sponge Suberites domuncula which is bitter-tasting and not eaten by fish.

Similarly, sea urchins use their tube feet to pick up debris from the bottom and attach it to their upper surfaces. They use shells, rocks, algae and sometimes sea anemones.

=== Distraction ===
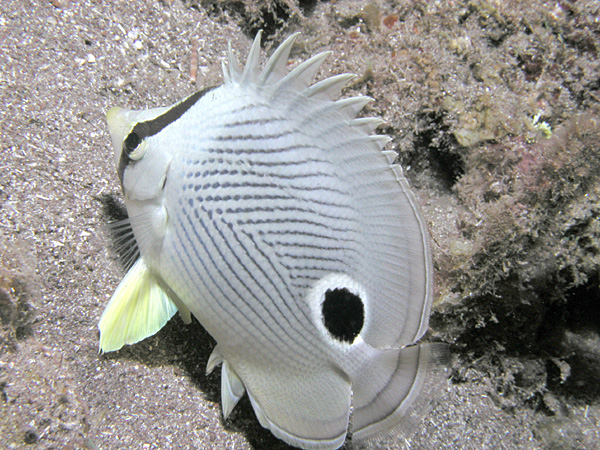
Four-Eye Butterflyfish, Chaetodon capistratus, showing its concealed eye and false eyespot near the tail

Many fish have eyespots near their tails, a form of automimicry, to distract attacks away from the vulnerable head and eye. For example, Chaetodon capistratus has both a (disruptive) eyestripe to conceal the eye, and a large eyespot near its tail, giving the impression that the head is at the tail end of the body.

=== Disruption of outlines ===
Fish such as Dascyllus aruanus have bold disruptive patterns on their sides, breaking up their outlines with strong contrasts. Fish like Heniochus macrolepidotus have similar bands of colour that extend into fins projecting far from the body, distracting attention from the true shape of the fish.

Some fish which mimic seaweeds such as the frogfishes Antennarius marmoratus and Pterophryne tumida have elaborate projections and spines which are combined with complex disruptive coloration. These have the effect of destroying the signature "fish" outline of these animals, as well as helping them to appear as pieces of algae.

=== Adaptive coloration ===
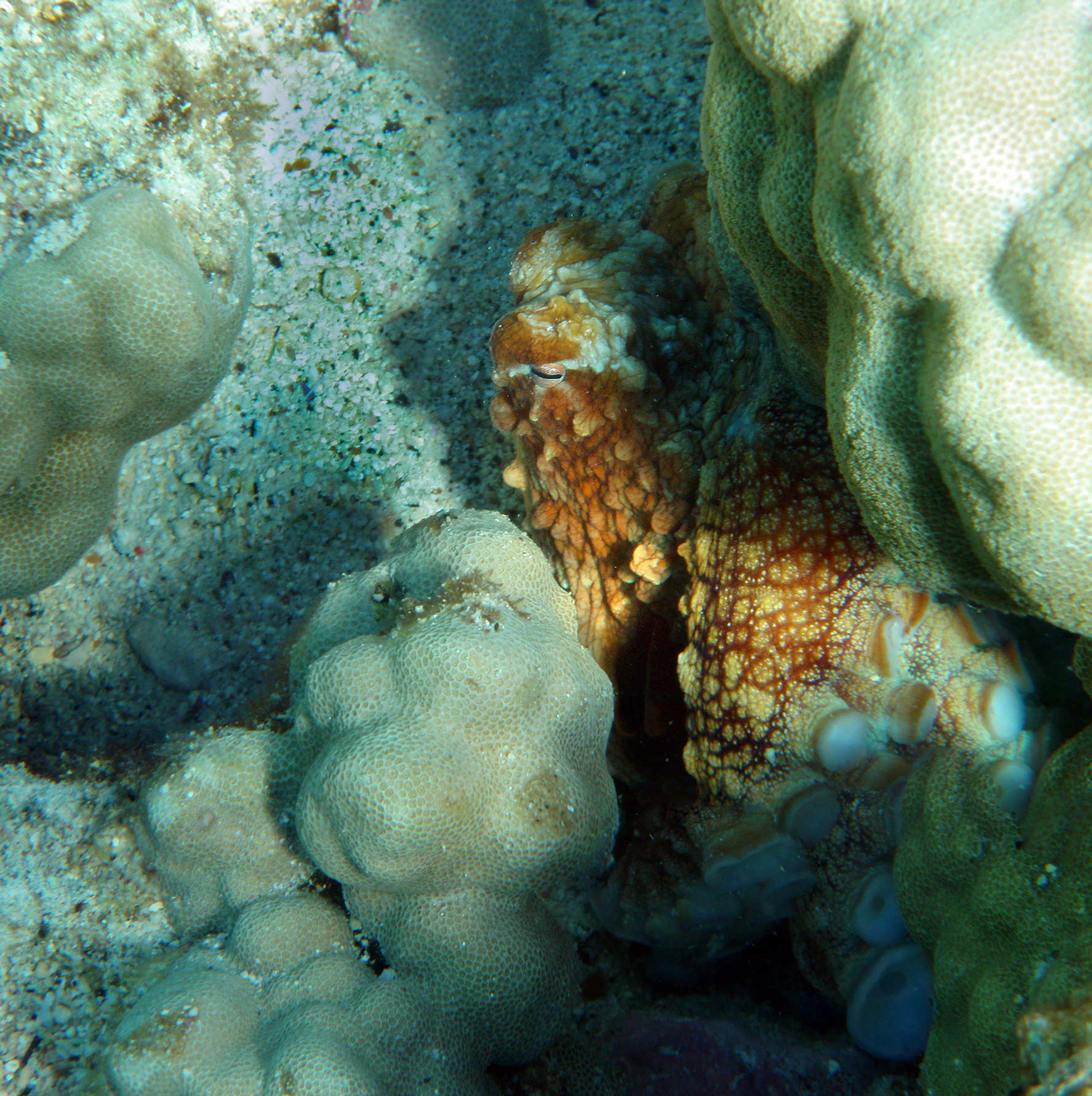
The big blue octopus hunts by day, changing its colours and pattern to be cryptic or for signalling

A variety of marine animals possess active camouflage through their ability to change colour rapidly. Several bottom-living fish such as the flounder can hide themselves effectively against a variety of backgrounds. Many cephalopods including octopus, cuttlefish, and squid similarly use colour change, in their case both for camouflage and signalling. For example, the big blue octopus, Octopus cyanea, hunts during the day, and can match itself to the colours and textures of its surroundings, both to avoid predators and to enable it to approach prey. It can perfectly resemble a rock or a coral it is hiding beside. When necessary, in order to scare away a potential predator, it can display markings which resemble eyes.

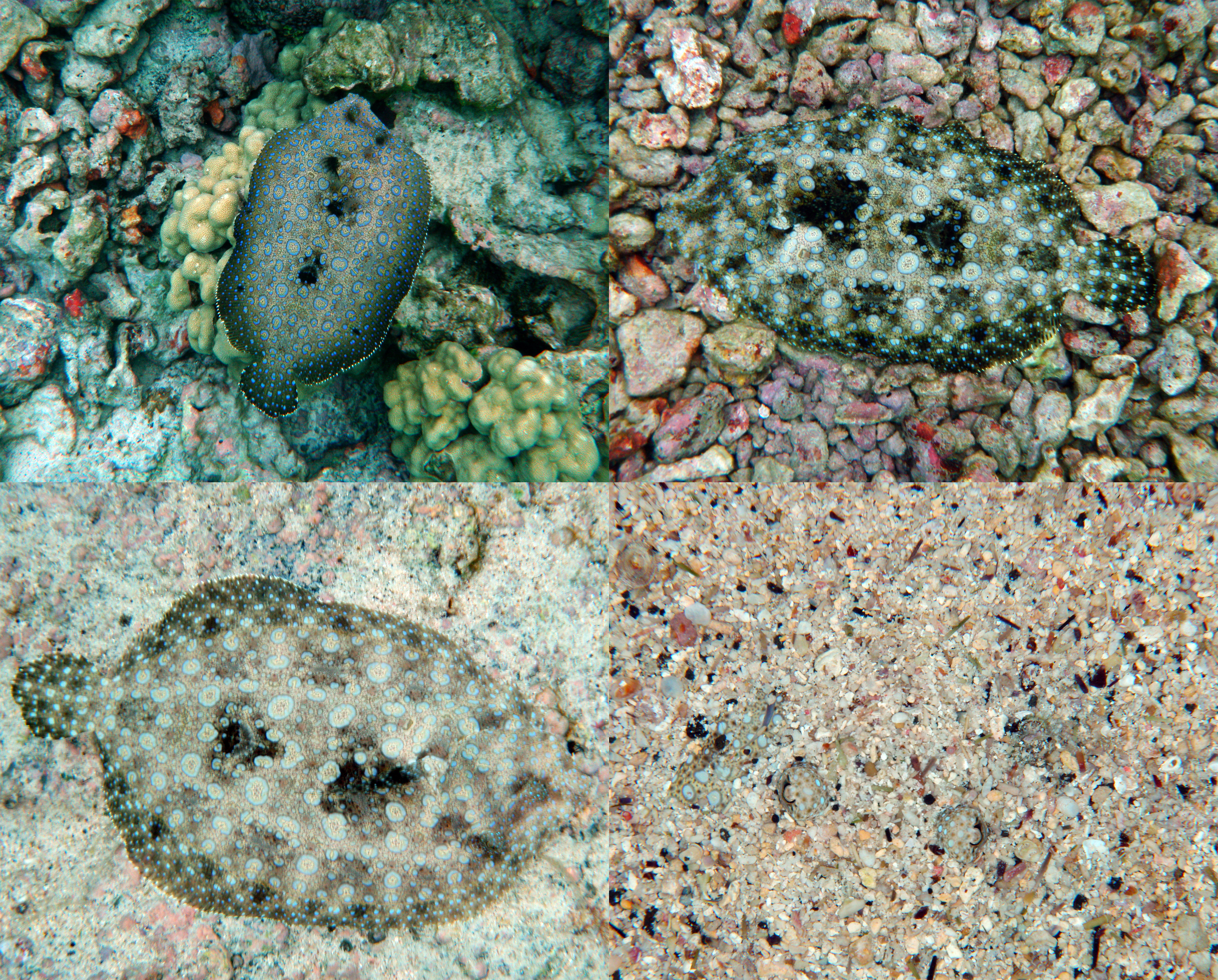
Four frames of a peacock flounder taken a few minutes apart

Like all flounders, Peacock flounders, Bothus mancus, have excellent adaptive camouflage. They use cryptic coloration to avoid being detected by both prey and predators. Whenever possible rather than swim, they crawl on their fins along the bottom while constantly changing colours and patterns to match their background. In a study, some flounders demonstrated the ability to change pattern in eight seconds. They were able to match the pattern of checkerboards that they were placed on. Changing pattern is an extremely complex process involving the flounder's vision and hormones. If one of the fish's eyes is damaged, or covered by the sand, the flounder has difficulties in matching its pattern to its surroundings. Whenever the fish is hunting or hiding from predators, it buries itself into the sand, leaving only the eyes protruding.

=== Ultra-blackness ===
In the deep sea at depths greater than 200 metres, very little sunlight filters down from the ocean surface. However, predators may use bioluminescence to illuminate prey, and vice versa, detecting them by the light that they reflect. At least 16 species of deep-sea fish have a skin so extremely black that it reflects less than 0.5% of the light that falls on it at a wavelength of 480 nm. The blackest species was in the predatory genus Oneirodes (dreamers) which reflected only 0.044% of ambient light, and was almost as black across the range 350 to 700 nm.

The ultra-blackness is achieved with a thin but continuous layer of particles in the dermis, melanosomes. These particles both absorb most of the light, and are sized and shaped so as to scatter rather than reflect most of the rest. The optimum size was predicted to be 600 to 800 nm. The optimum shape was similarly predicted to be bean-shaped with the long axis 1.5 to 3.0 times as long as the short axes. 14 of 16 species met these requirements. Modelling suggests that this camouflage should reduce the distance at which such a fish can be seen by a factor of 6 compared to a fish with a nominal 2% reflectance.

Species with this adaptation are widely dispersed in the phylogenetic tree of bony fishes (Actinopterygii), being found in at least one species in each of the orders Anguilliformes, Stomiiformes, Myctophiformes, Beryciformes, Ophidiiformes, Perciformes, and Lophiiformes. This distribution in turn implies that natural selection has driven the convergent evolution of ultra-blackness camouflage independently many times.

== See also ==
- Deception in animals

== Sources ==
- Cott, Hugh (1940). Adaptive Coloration in Animals. Oxford: Oxford University Press.
- Herring, Peter (2002). The Biology of the Deep Ocean. Oxford: Oxford University Press. ISBN 9780198549567. LCCN 2002277653. OCLC 47677060. OL 3581407M.
