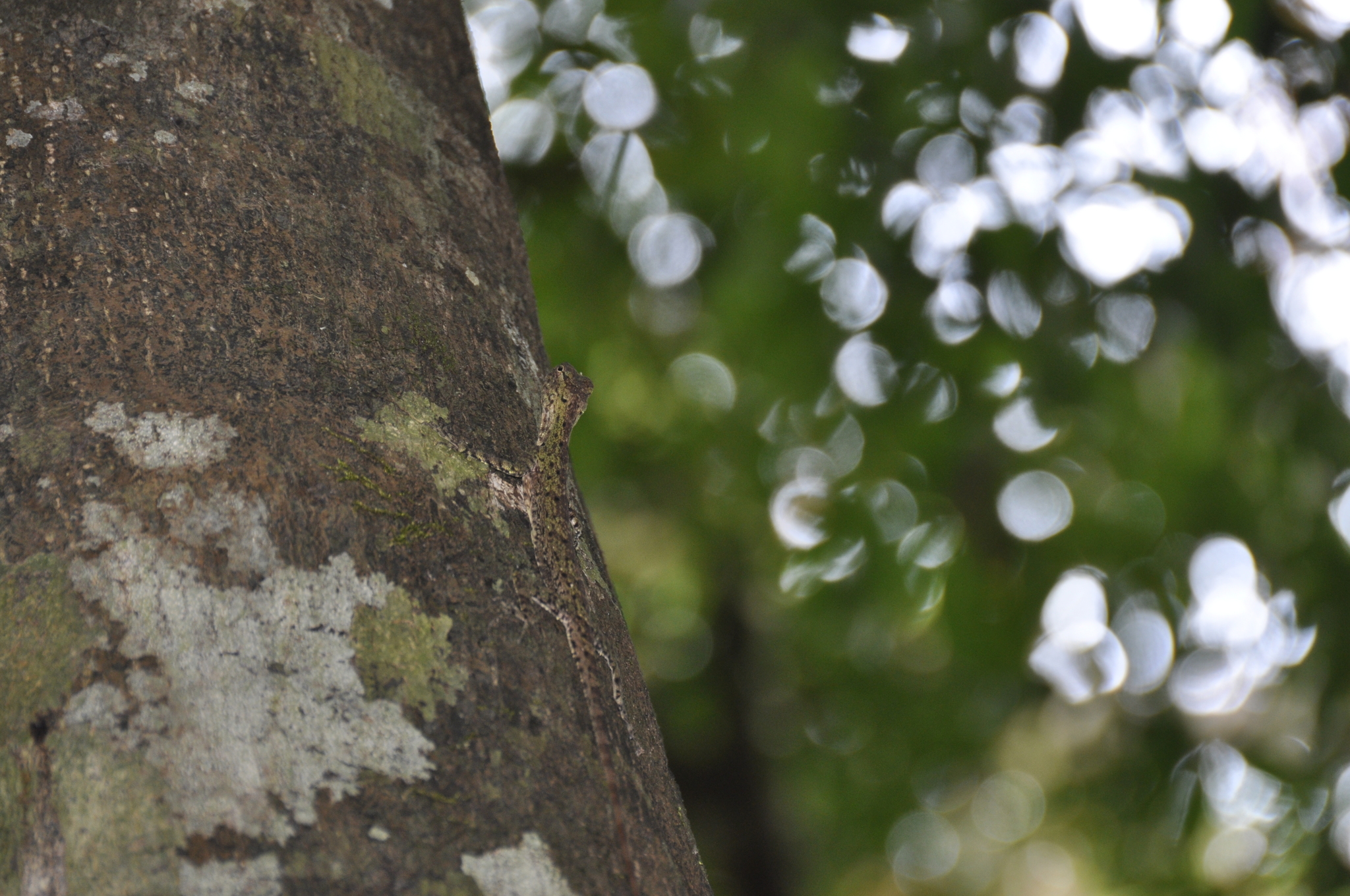
- Draco indochinensis on a tree in Tân Phú district, Đồng Nai, Vietnam

Conservation status
- Least Concern (IUCN 3.1)

Scientific classification
- Kingdom: Animalia
- Phylum: Chordata
- Class: Reptilia
- Order: Squamata
- Suborder: Iguania
- Family: Agamidae
- Genus: Draco
- Species: D. indochinensis

Binomial name
- Draco indochinensis M.A. Smith, 1928

= Draco indochinensis =

Species of lizard

Draco indochinensis, also known as the Indochinese flying lizard or Indochinese gliding lizard, is a species of agamid lizard endemic to South-east Asia (Cambodia and southern Vietnam).

== Description ==
It has earlier been considered synonymous to or a subspecies of Draco blanfordii. However, phylogenetic data and other supporting morphological features indicate that it is a separate species. The dewlap of the male of this species is widest at its base and decreases in width over its entire length and terminates in a sharp point, as opposed to the distal expansion of the dewlap seen in Draco blanfordii. This feature may be shared with other Draco lizards. Both sexes have a thick, black transverse band that extends across the posterior gular region from one throat lappet to the other. Dark radial bands on the dorsal surface of the patagia of both sexes is also another feature.

The snout–vent length is about 108 millimetres (4.25 in). It has a moderately slender body and the nostrils are orientated upwards. The dorsal surface is mottled brownish-grey with darker speckling. The patagium (winglike membrane) is dark brown near the edge and paler brown near the body, with six transverse pale-edged bands. The ventral surface is yellow or pinkish, with the gular pouch a creamy yellow anteriorly, and bluish-grey and black posteriorly. The underside of the patagium is yellowish-brown.

== Distribution and habitat ==
Draco indochinensis is native to southeastern and eastern Cambodia and southern Vietnam. It is found in evergreen forests at altitudes of up to 500 metres (1,640 ft). It is an arboreal species and seldom descends to the ground. Little is known of its diet and behaviour.
